= Downing Centre =

Heritage-listed building in Sydney, Australia

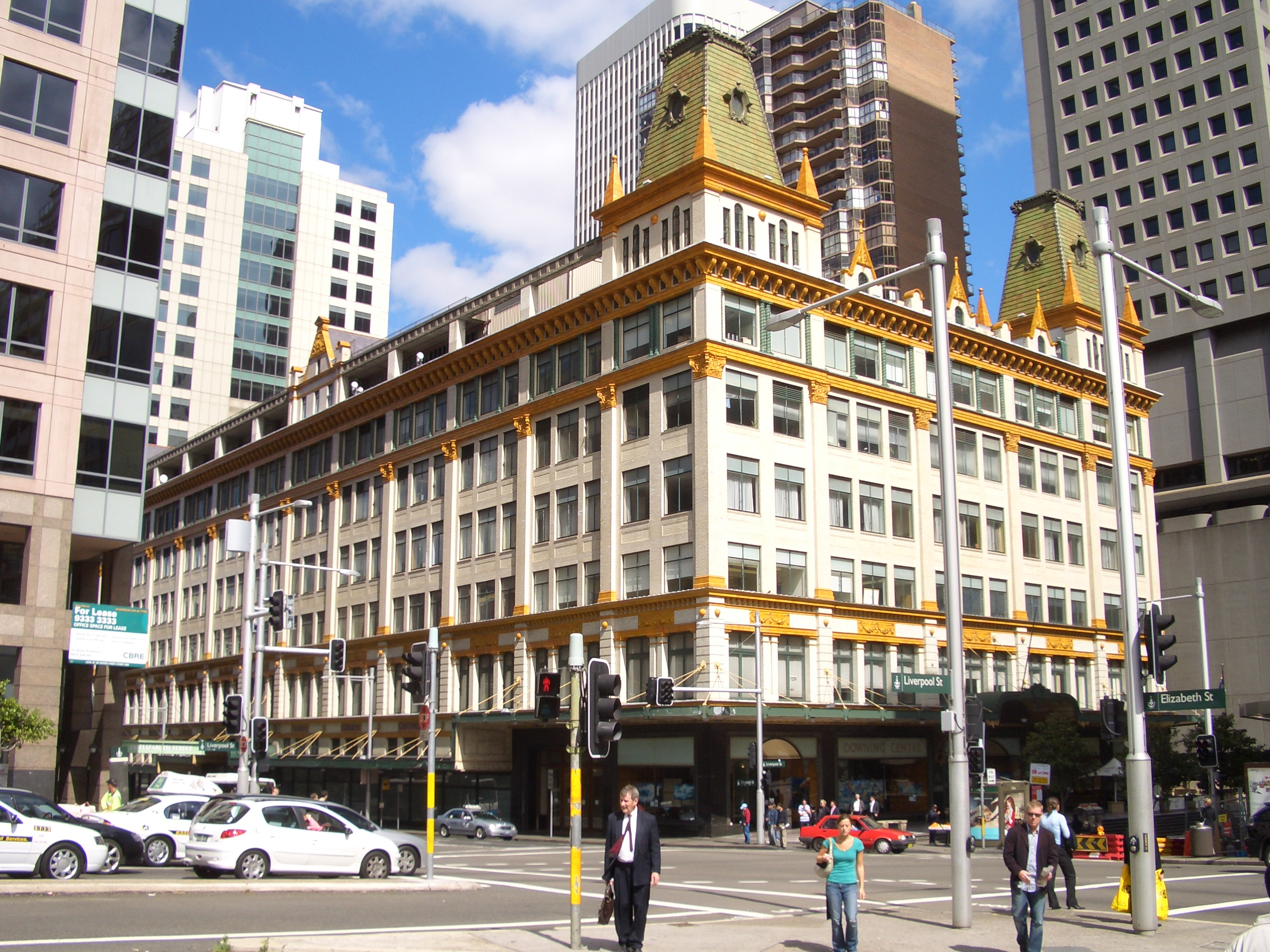
- Downing Centre, Sydney, as view from Hyde Park.

- Location within inner Sydney
- Former names: Mark Foy's Piazza Store
- Etymology: Reg Downing, Attorney General and Minister for Justice

General information
- Status: Completed
- Type: Emporium (original use); Court house (current use)
- Architectural style: Interwar Stripped Classical
- Location: 302 Castlereagh Street, Sydney, New South Wales, Australia
- Coordinates: 33°52′39″S 151°12′33″E
- Construction started: 1901
- Opened: 1908
- Renovated: 1924; 1985
- Client: Mark Foy's
- Owner: Government of New South Wales
- Landlord: Department of Communities and Justice

Technical details
- Material: Brick, iron
- Floor count: 8

Design and construction
- Architect: Arthur Anderson
- Architecture firm: McCredie & Anderson
- Main contractor: Douzans Bros

Renovating team
- Architects: Spain and Cosh; Ross & Rowe

New South Wales Heritage Register
- Official name: Sydney Downing Centre
- Type: Built
- Designated: 2 April 1999
- Reference no.: 000393

The Downing Centre, originally known as Mark Foy's Piazza Store, is a heritage-listed former department store and now courthouse complex in Sydney, New South Wales, Australia. It features state government courts, including the Local Court, the District Court, and a law library known as the Downing Centre Library. The Downing Centre forms part of the Department of Communities and Justice and houses court services and sheriffs offices. The Downing Centre is located in the Sydney central business district, on Liverpool Street, between Elizabeth Street and Castlereagh Street. It sits opposite the south-west corner of Hyde Park and Museum railway station. A subway links the Downing Centre directly to Museum Station from an entrance on Castlereagh Street.

The original building on the site was a two-storey building built for Mark Foy in 1908, designed by Arthur Anderson and named called Mark Foy's Piazza Store. Major extensions and alterations were made to the store in 1927–1930, designed by Spain and Cosh in collaboration with other architects. The building was renamed as the Downing Centre in 1991 in honour of Reg Downing, a former NSW Attorney General and Minister for Justice.

== History ==
Mark Foy was a successful draper who was born and apprenticed in Ireland and arrived in Melbourne in 1858. He probably worked in established firms before going to the goldfields in 1859 and establishing his own shop in Collingwood where he prospered expanding into three shops by 1875 and six by 1880. In 1882, due to failing health, he passed the original store to his eldest son, Francis, withdrew his capital and brought in William Gibson as Francis' partner. He left with his wife for Europe, however, died en route in San Francisco in January 1884. Soon after Francis sold out to Gibson and moved to Sydney to establish a new business under his father's name, which would become the Mark Foy's department store chain.

Francis Foy moved to Sydney from Melbourne after the death of his father in 1884 and leased premises in Oxford Street with his brother Mark Jr. Early in the twentieth century, they bought up the fifteen properties which occupied most of the block bounded by Liverpool, Castlereagh, Elizabeth and Goulburn Streets. The existing buildings on the first three streets were demolished in 1907.

Initially a two-storey building designed by Arthur Anderson of the architectural firm McCredie & Anderson, the Mark Foy's Emporium was built in 1908 in the Australian Interwar Stripped Classical architectural style as a retail emporium for Mark Foy's. It had Sydney's first escalator, the Escalier Hoquart, and first car delivery service. The inspiration for the building, though not its detail, seems to have been Le Bon Marché in Paris (a connection commemorated still by the University of Technology Sydney in its other former Foy building). Many contractors and suppliers were involved in the new store. The distinctive yellow faience brickwork outside was imported from Bermotoff in Yorkshire, the white glazed bricks from Shaw's Rigg in Glasgow.

Mark Foy's became a limited company in 1909 and the brothers Francis and Mark Jr. devoted more time to sport, horse-racing, motoring and, in the case of Mark, the Hydro Majestic Hotel at Medlow Bath. H.V. Foy, another brother, managed the firm after Francis’ full retirement in 1914.

Major extensions and alterations were made to the store in 1927–1930, designed by Spain and Cosh and (according to MHNSW source) Esplin Architects, (Note: Spain & Cosh did not have a person of this name in their practice, and other sources show that the MHNSW source has likely misspelt the name "Esplin" as "Epslin". This architect is likely to be Donald Esplin, who practised with Stuart Mill Mould (see The Astor (Sydney)). However, I have so far been unable to find any connection on Trove or in other online sources linking Esplin to this building. The nearest I have found is regarding plans to build "large business premises" in Castlereagh Street opposite David Jones in 1927. (Laterthanyouthink, 12 Feb 2026)) in consultation with Ross & Rowe Architects, creating an eight-storey building. The display windows around the piazza and the upper-level ballroom were celebrated features of the renovated store. The design was originally planned to cover the whole block: a planned extension to the south to create a Goulburn Street frontage was not fully achieved before the Great Depression of the 1930s prevented further building, except for the Castlereagh Street entrance, associated with the Museum railway station.

In 1968 the Foy company was taken over by McDowell's, who were in turn absorbed by Waltons in 1972, but the store retained its name until Grace Bros leased it from the AMP in 1980 and closed the store in 1983. Already in the 1970s courts of justice had begun to use the upper floors, and in 1983 a government committee recommended a multi-court complex, with 16 new court-rooms in the Foy building.

The new complex, named the Downing Centre after Reg Downing, a former state Attorney-General and Minister for Justice, was opened by the Premier, Nick Greiner, in 1991.

The building was listed on the New South Wales State Heritage Register on 2 April 1999.

=== Modifications and dates ===
- 1916-1924 - Spain, Cosh & Dods: various works - removing and relocating lift and escalators, changes to doors, shop windows and frontage (builders Stuart Brothers) (Note: Note, no mention of Esplin in this source.)
- 1924 - Ross & Rowe: plans for multi-storey extension and additions (approved by SCC 1927, implemented in stages over time) - stripping out the interior with new structure consisting of four storeys and a roof terrace. Original portion formed the base and external character maintained and carried through to new levels (engineer AM McDonald, octagonal concrete columns with splayed 'mushroom' heads and flat plate reinforced concrete floors). Over time, store diminished in size/footprint, letting out floors to tenants to cover costs.
- 1960s - Changes to Piazza and replacement of building parts with 'modern' elements. Vinyl tiles placed over travertine floor of main entry. Mail well with famous chandelier closed up to enable the First Floor to be used and separately leased. The chandelier was used in a Brisbane complex and has now been relocated (back) over a new stair in the building.
- 1966 - Level 6 (roof terrace) additions for offices (State Planning Authority). Additions resulted in altered parapet and replacement of terracotta decoration with concrete beams.
- 1968 - Foy Co. overtaken by McDowells, then Waltons (1972). The store retained its name until 1980 when taken over by Grace Brothers.
- 1970s - Courts of justice occupied upper floors from the 1970s. Other than the structure, only a few internal elements remained at this time.
- 1983 - Retail function finally closed. The whole building had been owned by AMP Society for some years, with floors leased to various organisations and government departments, such as the Housing Commission through the 1970s and early 1980s. Government committee recommended that a multi-court complex, with 16 new courtrooms be accommodated in the Foy building. In 1981 the south wall was bricked up as a temporary measure with plans for the new complex following in 1985. Former Mark Foy's building adapted for use as courts.
- 1991 - Court complex opened and continues to operate as part of the District Court network. Significant Interwar additions and alterations to interior and exterior.
- 1993 - DA submitted to construct new 21 level court complex with two levels of judges' parking, ground and 18 levels over (John Maddison Tower, to the south), completed in 1994.

== Description ==
The former Mark Foys building occupies most of the block bounded by Elizabeth, Liverpool and Castlereagh Streets. It displays an eclectic mix of styles from the early years of the 20th century. The arrangement of shopfronts and windows is reminiscent of similar buildings in Chicago, while the truncated pyramid roofs at corners and steeply gabled pediments recall French Second Empire design. The building has a sandstone base, with a broad terrazzo piazza at the northern end, under a large awning. Similar awnings, with pressed metal soffits, extend along Elizabeth and Castlereagh Streets, with large metal-framed show windows beneath. The facade above the awning is of white glazed brick decorated with yellow faience and has large bronze framed windows. Integral mosaic tiled signs along the Elizabeth Street and Castlreagh Street facades advertise products once Lo sold in the store. The roofscape is dominated by the corner towers, clad in green tiles, and gabled parapet. Internally, notable features are the mosaic tiled and terrazzo floors, decorative plaster ceilings and column capitals, and the glass chandelier above the circular stair. The interior of the building now contains several courtrooms as well as facilities for witnesses, juries and people in custody. A new Jury Assembly area on the lower ground was opened in 2015.

== Significance ==
The former Mark Foys building is historically significant through its associations with the Foy family and the development of retailing in Australia. Its location is a physical reminder of the former retail core of the City which extended to Railway Square, and included the Anthony Hordern store (now demolished) and the Marcus Clarke stores. The store was a focus of City life for over half a century. The building is also associated with prominent architects of its time, McCredie & Anderson and H. E. Ross & Rowe. The former Mark Foys building is aesthetically significant as a high point of department store architecture in Australia for its time. It contains many fine examples of design and craftsmanship, including the moulded terracotta external elements, mosaic tiled and terrazzo floors, gilded brass surrounds to show windows, decorative plaster ceilings and wrought iron balustrading. The use of white glazed brick and yellow/orange glazed terracotta is a rare example of the extensive use of these early 20th-century building materials, and the unusual and distinctive facade and piazza continue to be a landmark in Sydney. The building is a strong element in the streetscape at the corner of Hyde Park. The building also has technical significance as an early and technically innovative reinforced concrete flat plate structure, as well as representing an early instance of facade retention and sympathetic additions.

== In popular culture ==
The exterior served as the fictional "Goode's" department store in the 2018 film Ladies in Black.

== Gallery ==
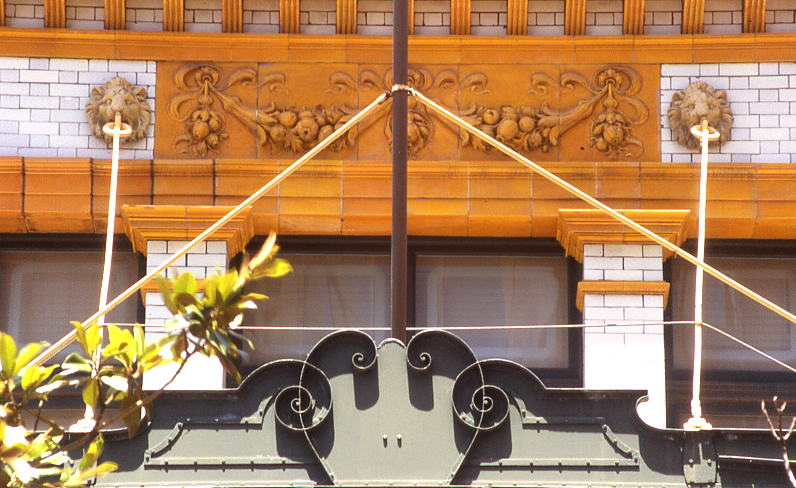
Downing Centre, detail

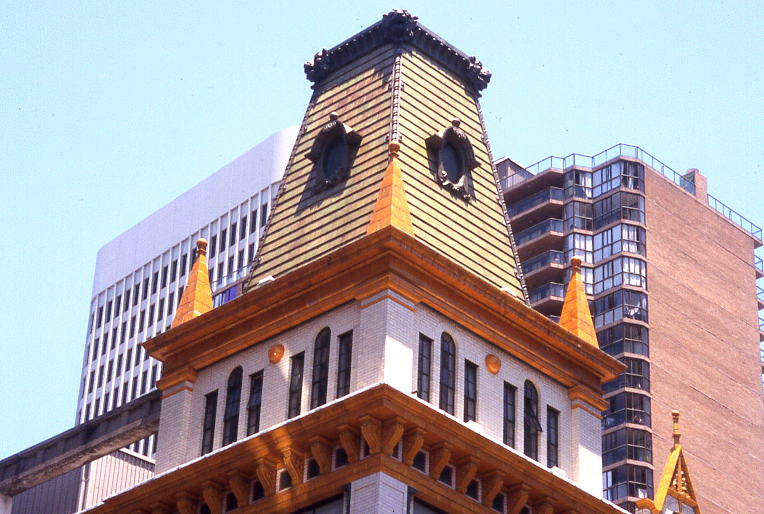
Downing Centre, detail

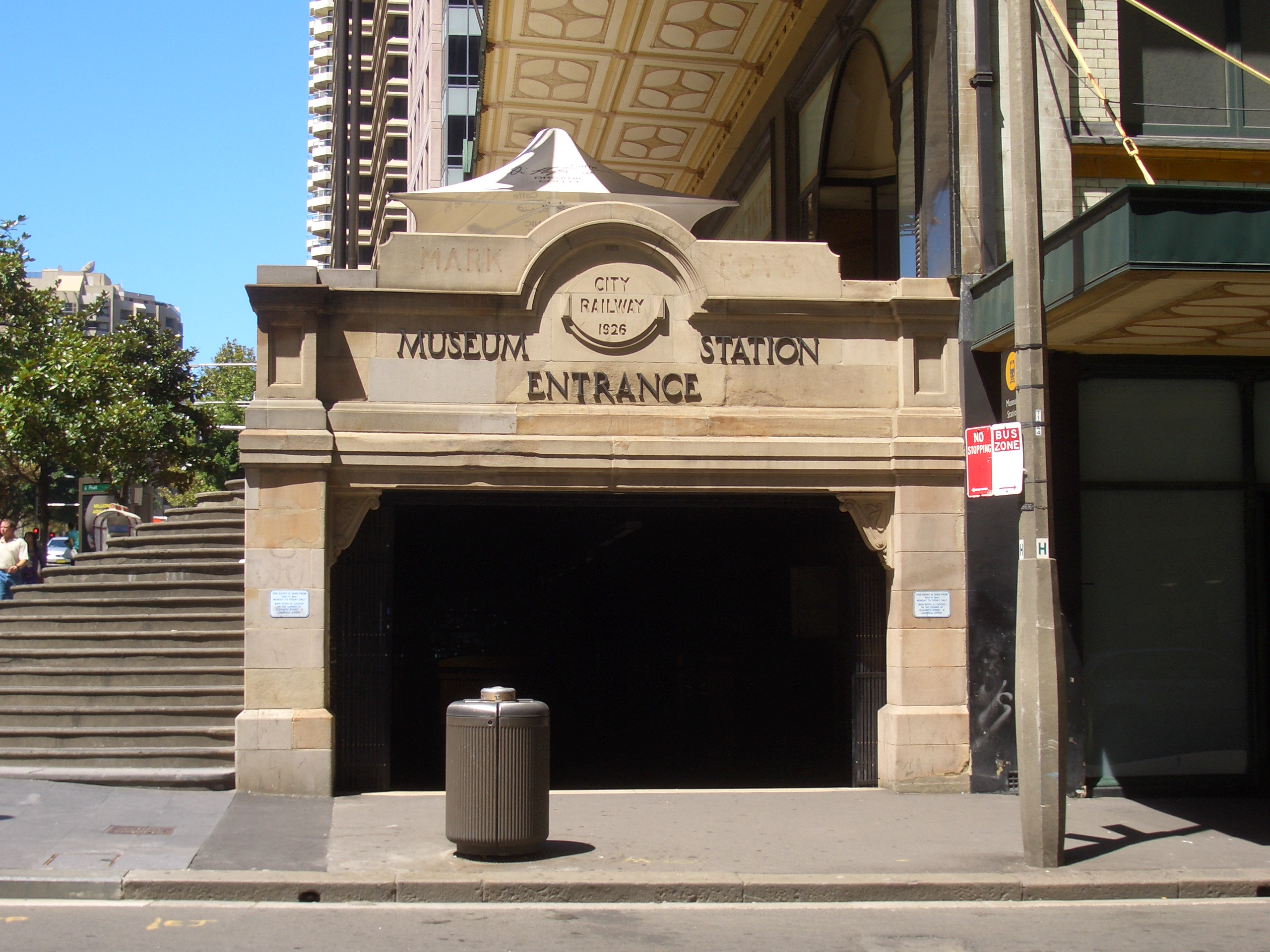
Museum station entrance at the Downing Centre, Castlereagh Street

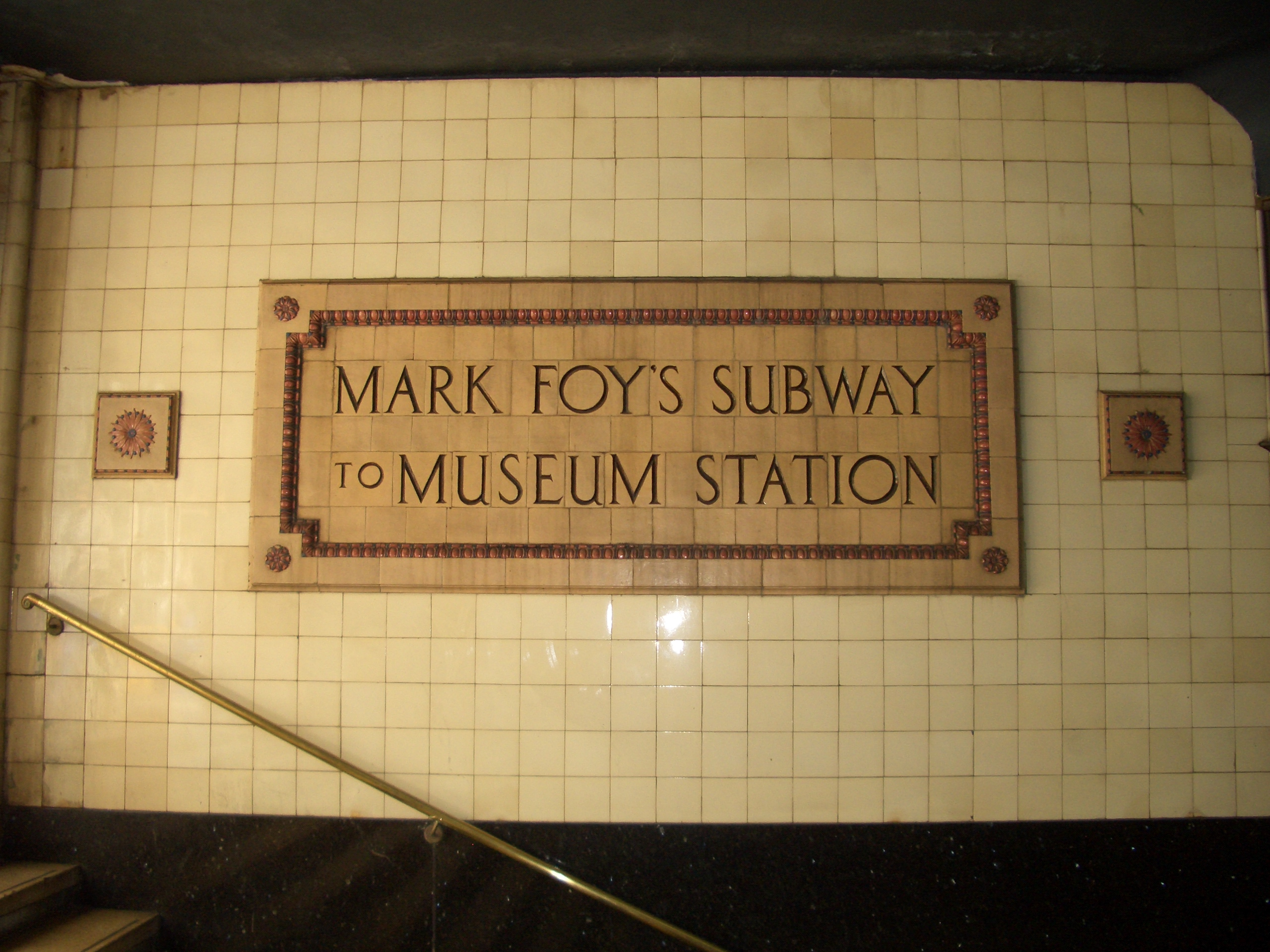
Museum station subway from the Downing Centre entrance

== See also ==
- City of Sydney
- Australian non-residential architectural styles
