= Mark Foy's =

Australian online department store

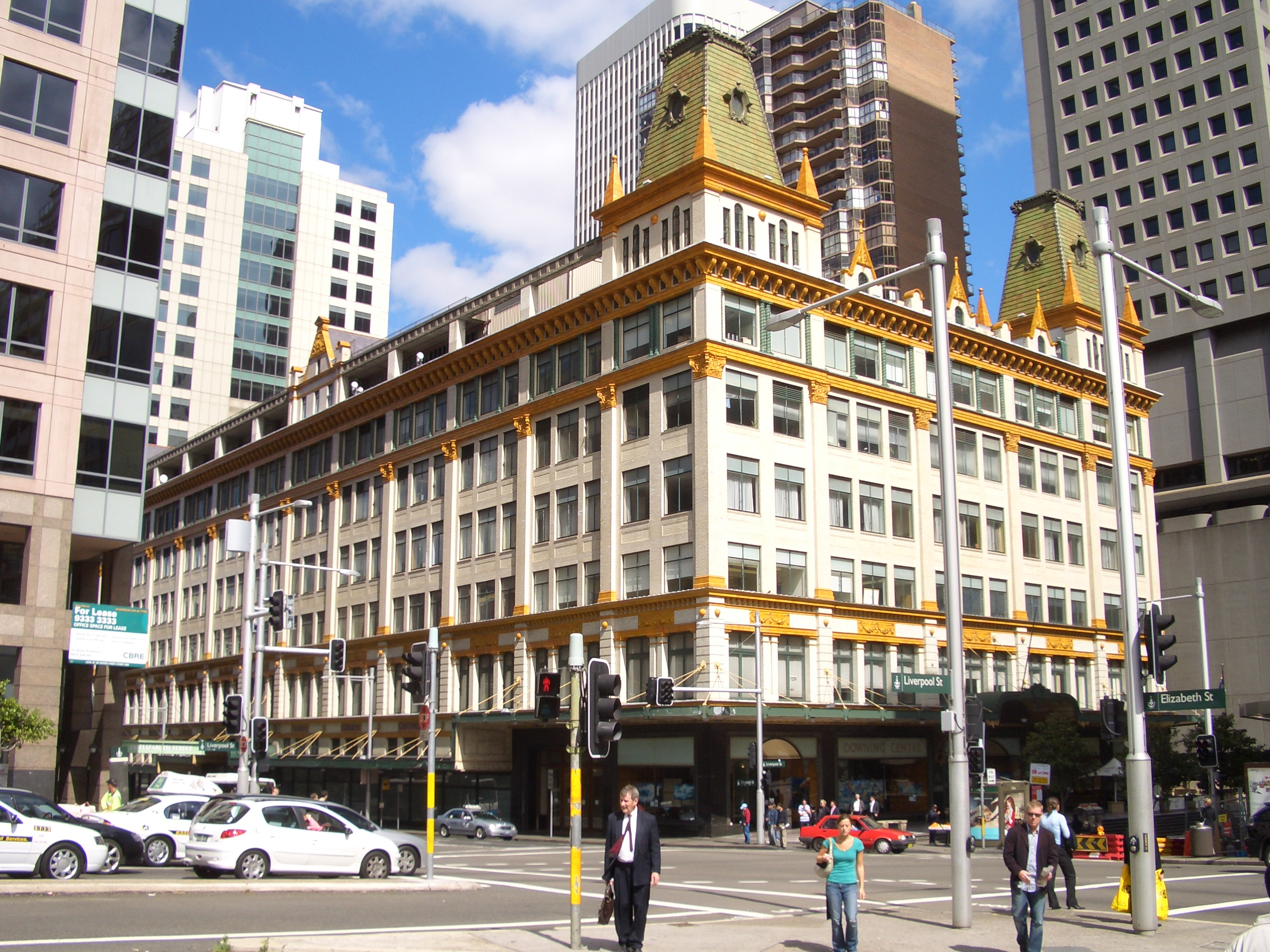
- Exterior of the now closed Mark Foy's flagship store on Liverpool Street in Sydney (2006)
- Industry: Retail
- Founded: 1885; 141 years ago in Sydney, Australia
- Founder: Francis Foy; Mark Foy
- Headquarters: Sydney, Australia
- Number of locations: 0 (Note: Since its revival in May 2026, online-only.)
- Services: Online shopping
- Owner: Mark Foy
- Number of employees: 7 (2026)
- Website: mark-foys.com

Mark Foy's is an Australian online luxury department store founded in 1885 by Francis and Mark Foy. Its flagship store operated in Sydney until the chain entered receivership and closed all branches in 1980. In 2026, the department store was revived as an online retailer by Mark Foy, the great-grandson of Hugh Victor Foy.

== History ==
After first establishing their store on Oxford Street in 1885, the Foy brothers opened Mark Foy's Piazza Store in 1909 on Liverpool Street. This was a three-storey store (two floors plus basement) designed by architects Arthur McCredie & Arthur Anderson with a turreted mansard roof. The building was partially modelled on the Parisian Le Bon Marche department store. Its piazza, chandeliers, marble, and sumptuous ballroom made it a Sydney institution and one of Australia's foremost fashion stores. The store had Australia's first escalator. The store stretched around a whole city block and gave rise to the colloquial saying, when referring to a person of overweening confidence, "You've got more front than Mark Foy's."

The store was remodelled in 1927. The store was linked in 1926 to the newly opened Museum railway station by underground subway.

The company had its most profitable year in 1954/1955. With the decline of the Liverpool street area in the 1950s and 1960s, Mark Foy's began to experience financial decline declaring its first financial loss in 1966/1967.

A store was opened at Rockdale in 1963 at Southside Plaza in Rockdale. The Rockdale store was extensively damaged by fire in 1967. Rebuilt, it became a McDowells store and then was rebranded as Waltons in 1972. In 1964 Mark Foy's opened a store in the Sydney suburb of Eastwood and in 1966 in Westfield Burwood. The Eastwood Store became a McDowells store and then a Waltons. Other stores were opened across Sydney's suburbs at Chatswood, Northbridge, Double Bay, Bankstown, Bondi Junction Plaza, Pymble, Spit Junction, Roselands Shopping Centre and Canberra, as well as in Centrepoint, on 252 George Street as well as its mid-city attempt on King Street elsewhere in Sydney's central business district.

In 1968 Mark Foy's was taken over by McDowells Holdings. In 1972, McDowells was in turn acquired by Waltons. After Waltons was split in 1987, six stores were sold to George Bloomfield of Australian clothing manufacturer Wraggs. The stores still trading as Mark Foy's, were sold again to Clothing retailer Richards in November 1986.

In 1980, when it ceased trading after going into receivership, the City Piazza building briefly became "Grace Bros Piazza" until 1982. The natural shift of the retailing hub further north of the CBD, around Pitt Street Mall, led to its closure.

The City Piazza building is now used as a complex of state courthouses known as the Downing Centre. However, its former role is preserved in the ornate tilework on the facade and surroundings. The Mark Foy's warehouse is a heritage brownstone building located on nearby Goulburn Street, which has been converted into residential apartments known as Sydney Mansions.

=== 2026 revival ===
In May 2026, the store was revived as an online department store, under the ownership of former real estate agent Mark Foy. Employing only seven staff, orders are sent directly from suppliers in Italy and France to customers. Foy is the great-grandson of Hugh Victor Foy, a forming manager of the store and brother of Francis Foy.

== Ice skating rink ==
In 1950, an ice skating rink was installed on the fifth floor of the store as part of a Swiss alpine setting for the presentation of skating costumes and evening gowns. The miniature rink opened at lunchtime on 11 April 1950 for the fashion parade titled "Fashion Fantasy On Ice", which would have a duration of 10 days. There was the prospect of customers being able to use the miniature ice rink.

== Mark Foy's and sectarianism ==
William McInnes wrote in his 2010 work The Making of Modern Australia that the Foy family, Irish-born Roman Catholics, would only employ Catholics, and stocked uniforms of the major Catholic schools, in an environment when government organisations had a policy to not employ Catholics, while David Jones specialised in Anglican school uniforms.

== Other business interests ==
Mark Foy also founded the Hydro Majestic Hotel at Medlow Bath, and Australia's oldest open-boat sailing club, the Sydney Flying Squadron, founded in 1891.

== Gallery ==
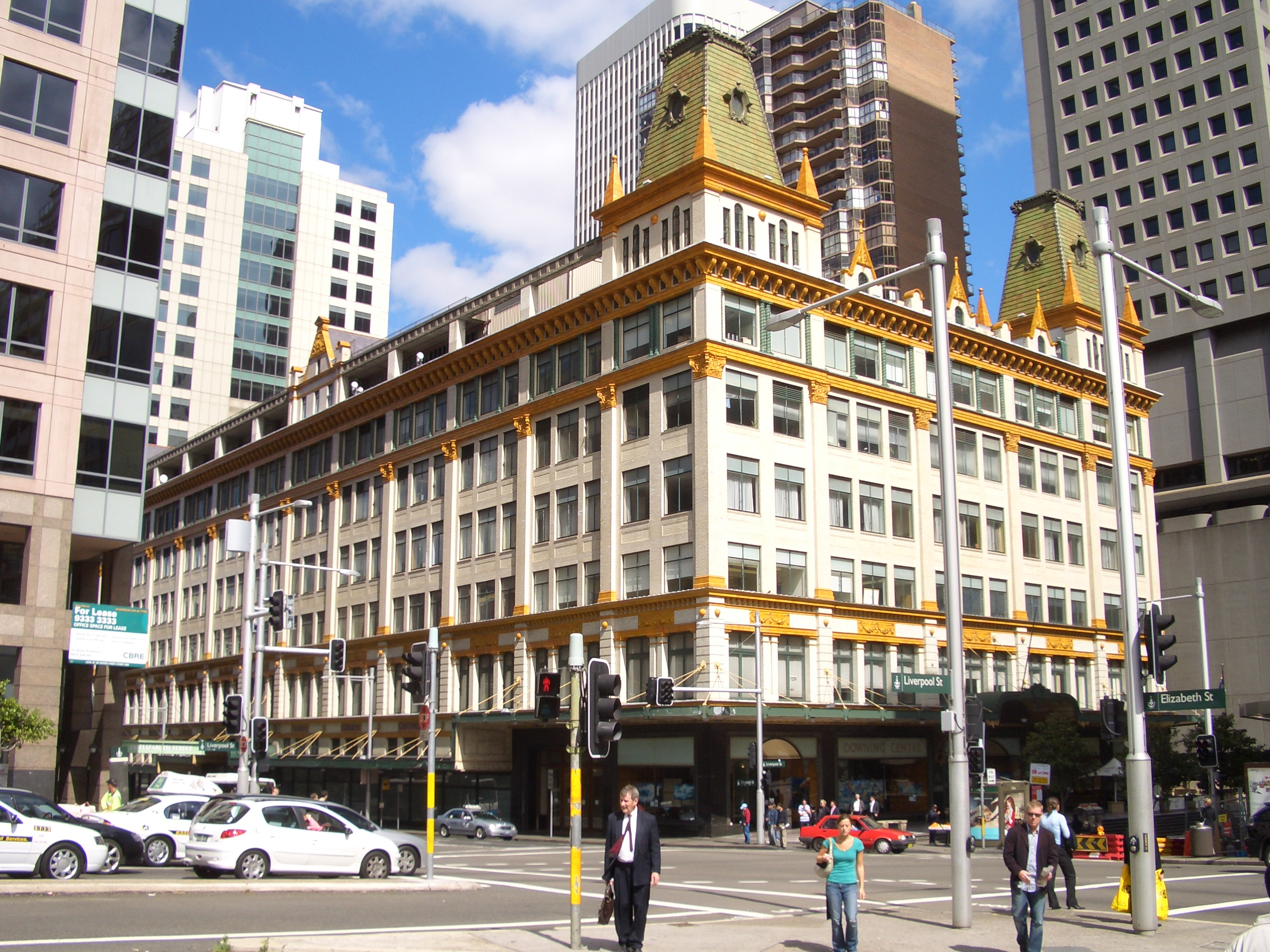
Downing Centre, former Mark Foy's department store, Sydney central business district

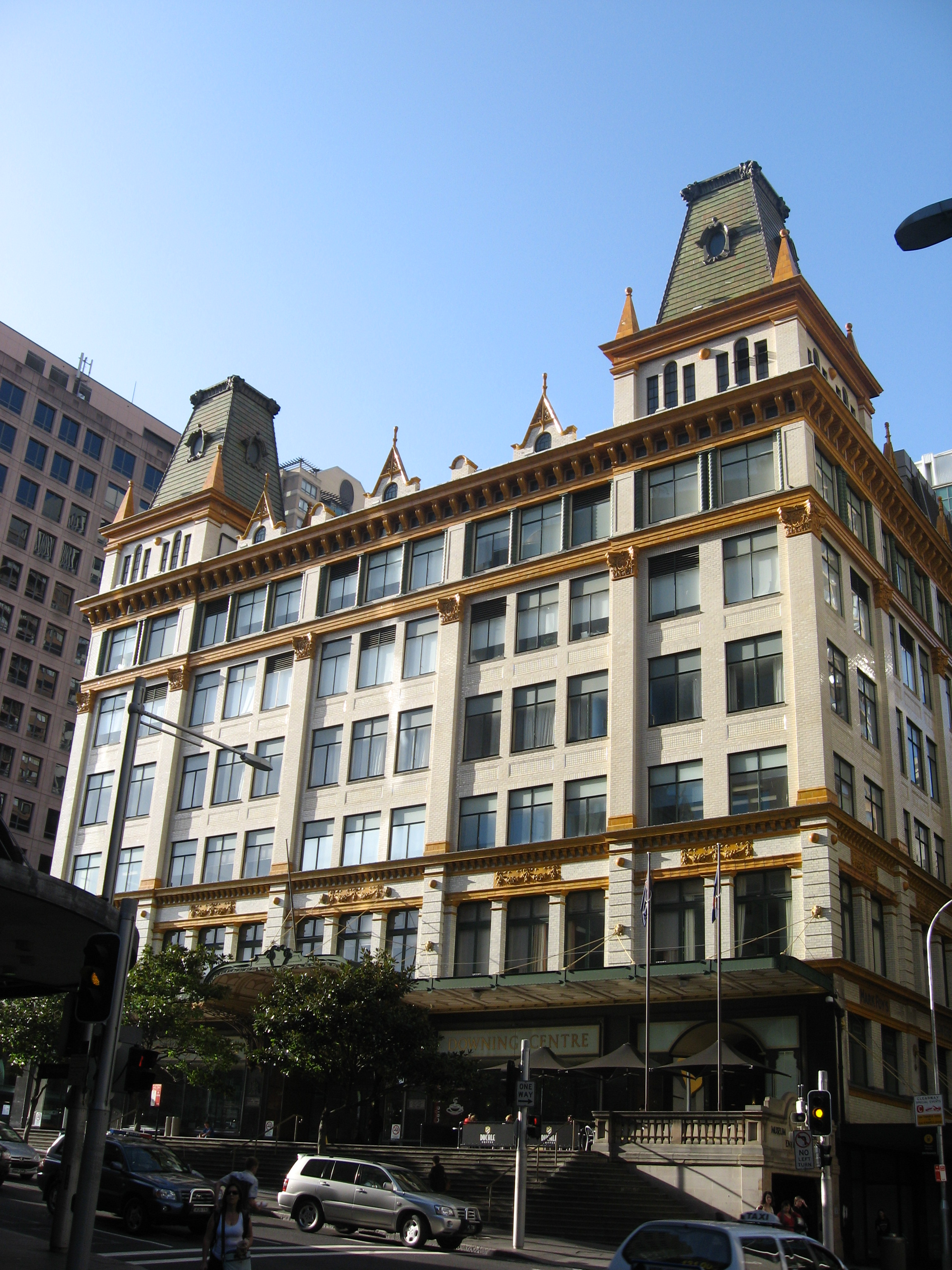
Facade of the Downing Centre in 2008.

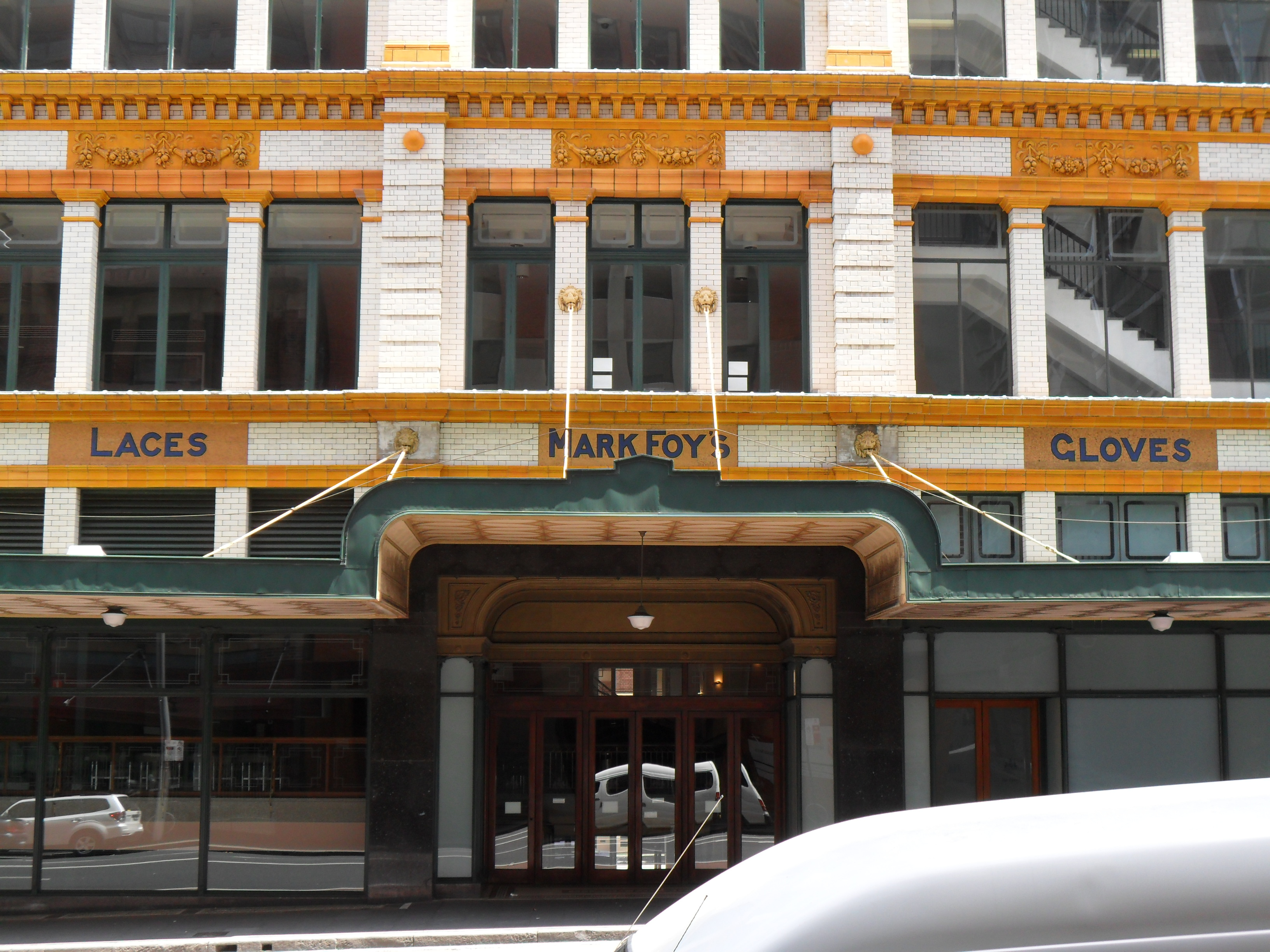
Entrance sign on the building now known as the Downing Centre

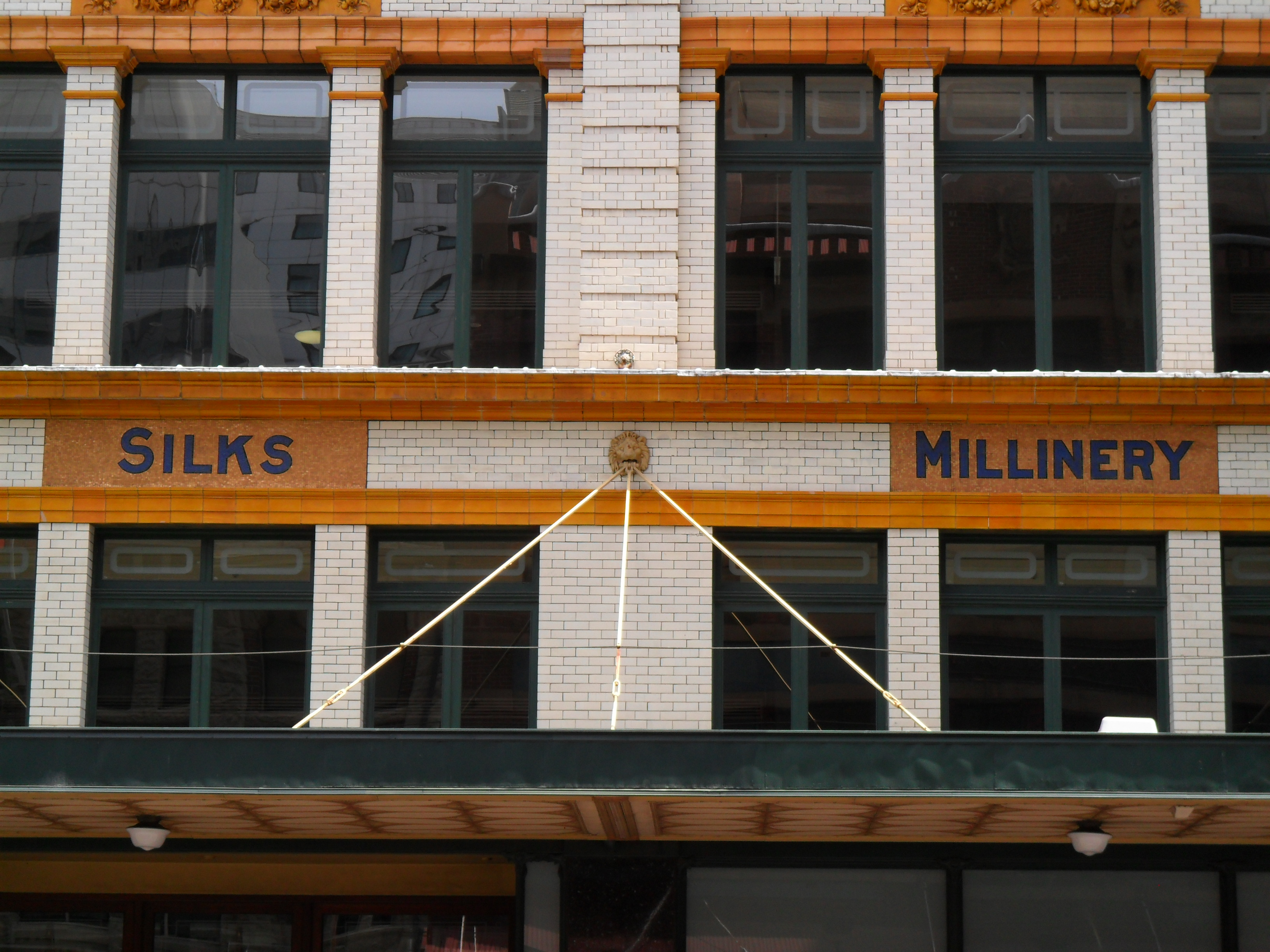
Signs on the side of the building now known as the Downing Centre

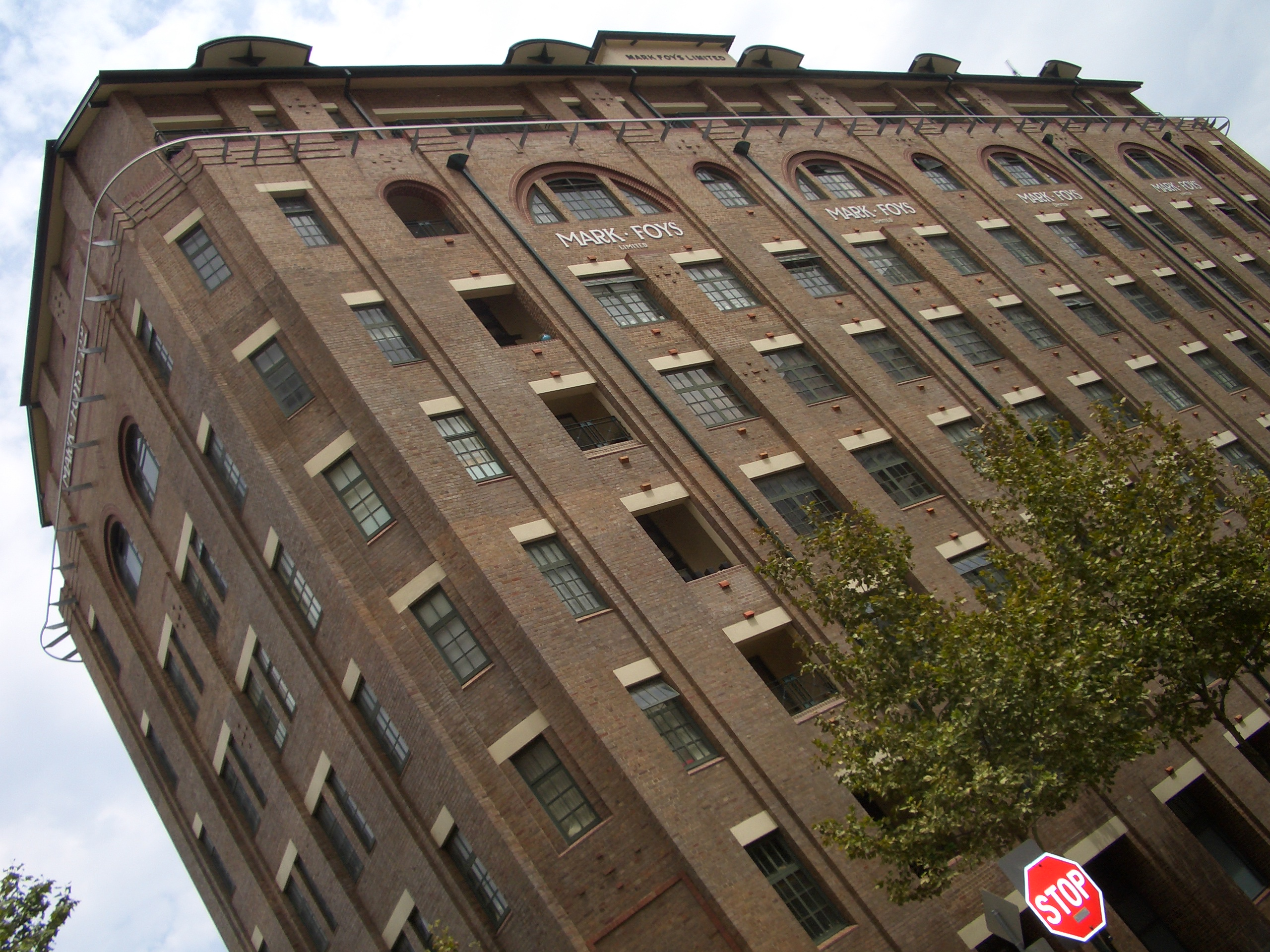
Sydney Mansions, former Mark Foy's warehouse, Surry Hills

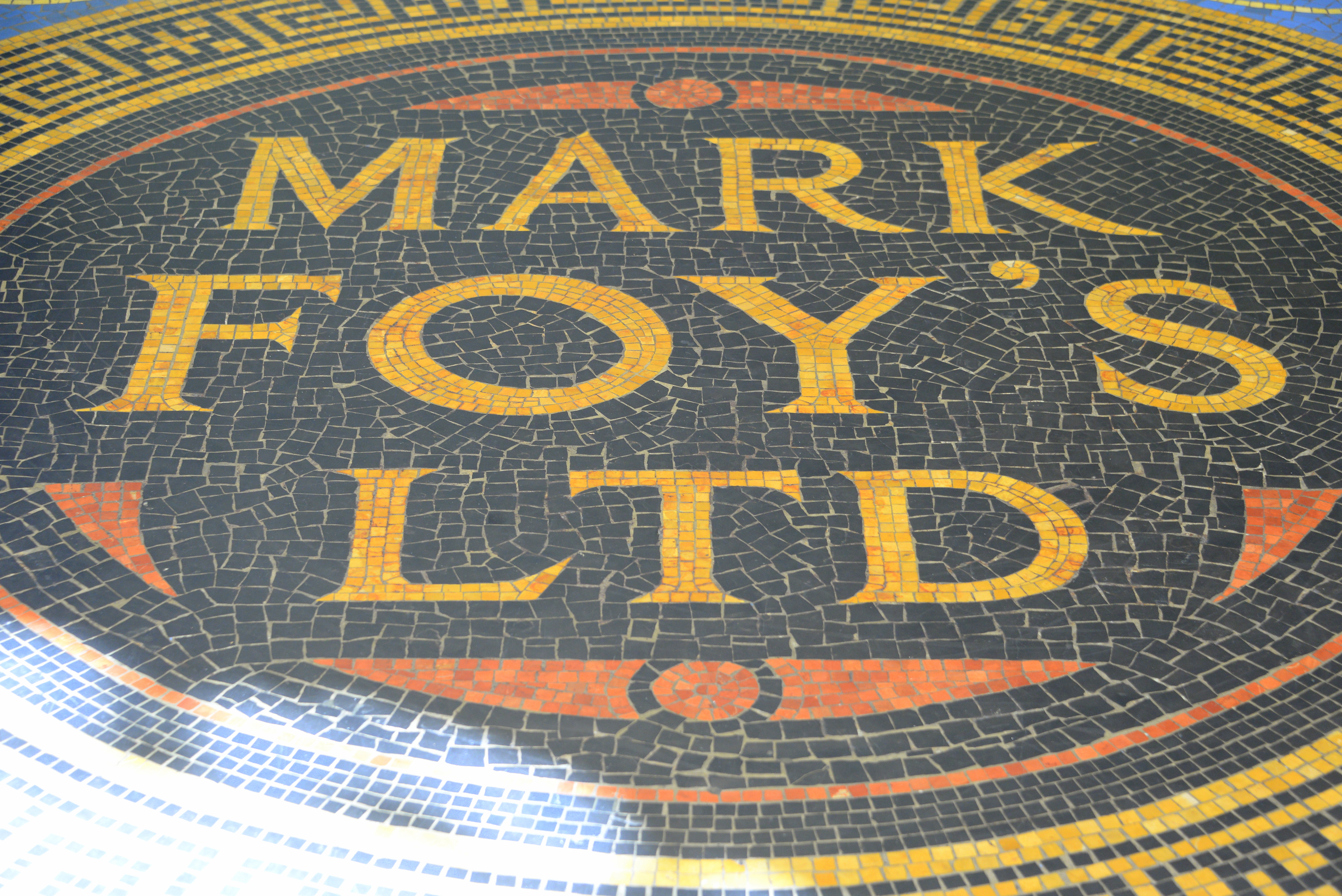
Ornate decoration on the ground of the Liverpool Street entrance to the former Mark Foy's Emporium, now the Downing Centre.

== See also ==
- Foy & Gibson
