= Museum railway station =

Railway station in Sydney, Australia

Museum
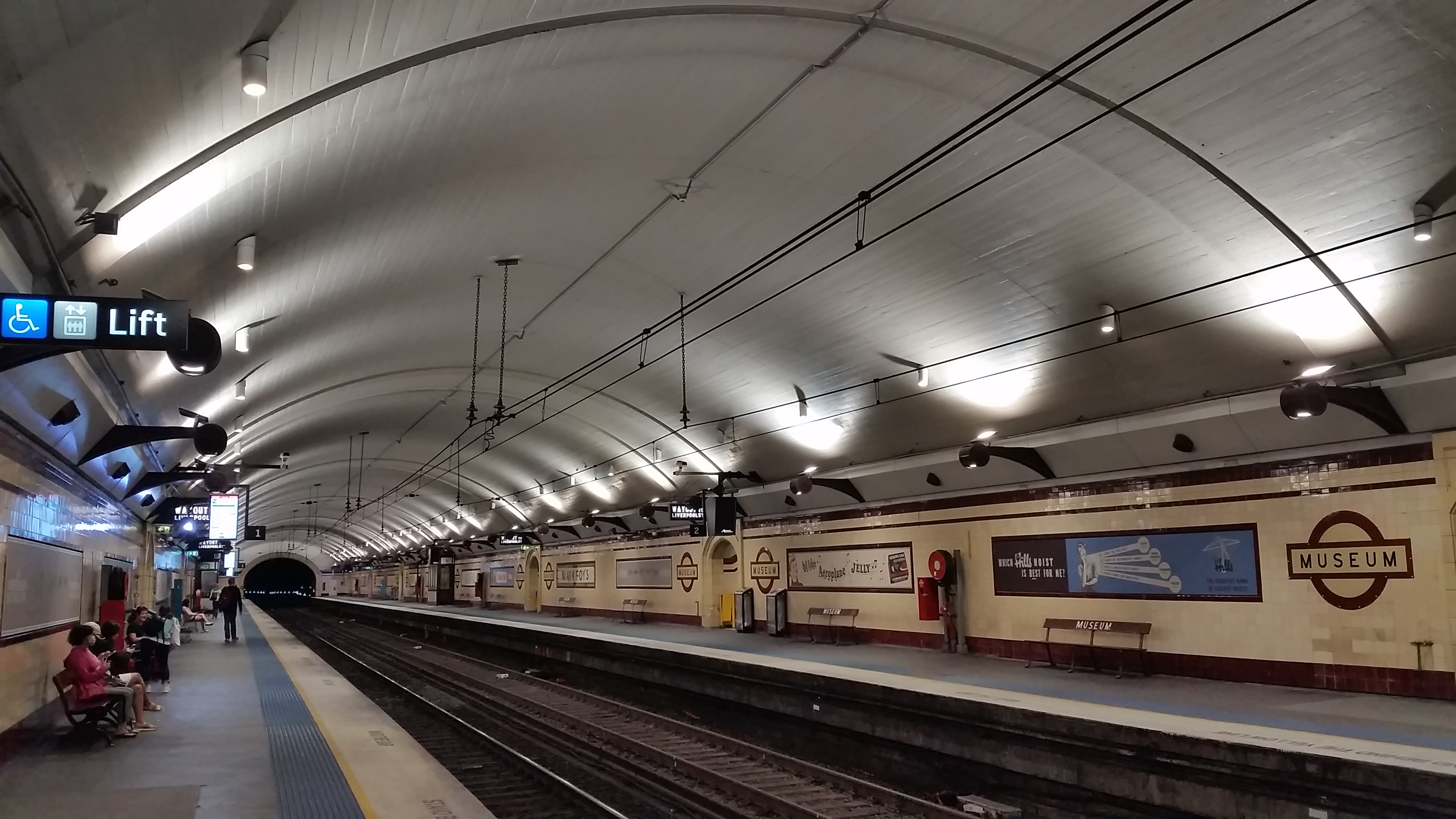
- Museum railway station platform, March 2020

General information
- Location: 3 Elizabeth Street, Sydney CBD, New South Wales, Australia
- Coordinates: 33°52′34″S 151°12′35″E
- Owner: Transport Asset Manager of New South Wales
- Operator: Sydney Trains
- Line: City Circle
- Distance: 4.99 km (3.10 mi) from Central (clockwise)
- Platforms: 2 side
- Tracks: 2
- Connections: Bus

Construction
- Structure type: Underground
- Platform levels: 1
- Parking: Limited on-street parking only
- Accessible: Yes
- Architect: John Bradfield (designer)
- Architectural style: Inter-War Stripped Classical

Other information
- Status: Staffed
- Station code: MSM
- Website: Transport for NSW

History
- Opened: 20 December 1926

Passengers
- 2025: 5,336,205; 14,620 (daily) (Sydney Trains)
- Rank: 30

Services
Preceding station	Sydney Trains	Following station
St James towards Parramatta or Leppington	Leppington & Inner West Line	Central as the Airport & South Line towards Macarthur
St James towards Liverpool	Liverpool & Inner West Line clockwise only	Central towards City Circle
St James as the Inner West & Leppington Line towards Parramatta or Leppington	Airport & South Line	Central towards Macarthur

New South Wales Heritage Register
- Official name: Museum Railway Station
- Type: State heritage (built)
- Designated: 2 April 1999
- Reference no.: 1207
- Type: Railway Platform / Station
- Category: Transport – Rail
- Builders: Department of Railways
Route map
- City Circle route map
Location

Museum railway station is a heritage-listed underground commuter rail station that is located on the City Circle route at the southern end of Hyde Park in the Sydney central business district of New South Wales, Australia. The station is served by Sydney Trains' T2 Leppington & Inner West Line, T3 Liverpool & Inner West Line and T8 Airport & South Line. The station is named after the nearby Australian Museum. It was added to the New South Wales State Heritage Register on 2 April 1999.

== History ==
=== The need for a city rail link ===
Railway development in Sydney began with the opening of the Sydney to Parramatta line in 1850. The terminus in Devonshire Street was, however, a considerable distance from most of the city's shops and workplaces located to the north. Disembarked railway passengers were required to either walk or be conveyed to the city centre by horse drawn and in later years steam and electrically powered trams which ran along George, Pitt or Elizabeth Streets. Throughout the second half of the 19th century and early years of the 20th century, Sydney developed a tram based public transport system which adequately served most parts of the city then settled. However, the growth in population and increased residential density in the inner suburban areas in particular resulted in the heavy congestion of thoroughfares leading into the city.

The first plans for extending the railway line into the city proper were prepared as early as 1857 by the Engineer in Chief, John Whitton. Surveys were undertaken to develop a railway line via Castlereagh Street to Circular Quay. By the 1860s it became clear that the area in or around Hyde Park was an ideal location for the city railway station. In 1862 plans were prepared for a line via Hyde Park to the Quay. Survey work continued between 1862 and 1889. In 1894 funds were made available and plans prepared for a railway line extension to a principal station between Park Street and St James Road and a branch line to Fort Macquarie. A change of Colonial Government, however, caused the abandonment of the project.

Mounting public concern over the increasing congestion of street traffic and the need for a rail link into the city eventually forced the Government to appoint a Royal Commission in March 1890. Thirty six separate schemes were submitted, advocating either extension along the western, business side of the city or, along the eastern side through Hyde Park to minimise the costly land resumptions necessary. The Royal Commission recommended the adoption of a proposal by the Chief Railway Commissioner, Mr Eddy, for a line along the eastern city edge to a terminus in Hyde Park. Public opinion was, however, against the loss of a large portion of Hyde Park for railway purposes and eventually the Royal Commission recommended the adoption of an alternative proposal from Mr Eddy which would see a central city station at King Street and branch lines splitting east and north.

No further action was taken until April 1896 when the Premier was forced "in the interest of the safety and comfort of the travelling public' to appoint a second Royal Commission to investigate and report on a suitable route. Inquiries and reports continued over the next few years and, while the Government did authorise the construction of Central station in 1900, agreement on a city railway service could not be achieved. Public opposition to the loss of Hyde Park land and the large capital outlay required were two major hurdles to settlement.

In 1908 a "Royal Commission on Improvement of the City of Sydney and its Suburbs" was appointed and recommended a plan for a loop railway proceeding down York Street to Circular Quay and returning to Central station via Macquarie Street and Hyde Park. Six underground stations were to be located generally in the positions of the Central, Town Hall, Wynyard, Circular Quay, St James and Museum stations of today.

=== Developments by John Bradfield ===
In 1912 the government commissioned the engineering firm of Mott and Hay who recommended an amended variation of the 1908 scheme with lines to the eastern and western suburbs. The scheme was not adopted being judged expensive, inefficient and impractical on numerous counts. In February 1915 the Chief Engineer of Metropolitan Railway Construction, John Bradfield, after studying the city railways of Europe and North America, submitted his "Report on the Proposed Electric Railways for the City of Sydney". Bradfield's farsighted plan proposed an electric underground city railway loop, viaduct crossings and tunnels out of the city, a Harbour Bridge Crossing and connections from the city network to two lines progressing north to Hornsby and to Narrabeen/Pittwater, a loop line through stations at King Cross, Paddington, Edgecliff, Bondi, Waverley, Coogee, Waterloo to Erskineville, a western loop to a Balmain station via a bridge from Millers Point to Darling Street, through stations at Rozelle, Leichhardt and Annandale to Stanmore and a branch line through Drummoyne, Five Dockm and Gladesville to Ryde – all costing around £18,000,000 excluding land resumptions.

St James station was proposed to form a vital link in the network by being built on two levels to accommodate both through trains from the North Shore, and city loop traffic in the style demonstrated by Grand Central Terminal, New York. In late 1915 the Government passed a City and Suburban Electric Railways Bill, the Vice President of the Legislative Council saying that "underground railways are a necessary part of great cities all over the world", Sydney then having a population of 800,000 people.

Work on the city railway system commenced in 1916 with the firm of Norton, Griffiths and Co beginning excavations tunnelling and foundation building for the link between Central station to Macquarie Street. After the firm's contract was cancelled in early 1918, work was taken over by the Department of Railways. Funding problems resulting from World War 1 austerity measures and political indecision forced construction to cease in June 1918 with the completion of the Macquarie Street Bridge and tunnels through the Botanical Garden. From 1917 to 1922, Bradfield maintained a publicity campaign to rally support for his scheme. He presented papers before conferences, professional bodies, public groups, union organisations and the popular press. A city railway built to his plan would benefit workers, he argued, by enabling them "to reside further afield and enjoy fresh are and sunlight", property owners and local government, because they would benefit from increased land values and rates and the future of Sydney in general because of the huge increases in population then forecast.

Excavation work for Museum (then known as Liverpool Street) and St James stations began in 1922/23. The imagination of the public was captivated as crowds gathered daily to view construction of the tunnels and stations beneath the Hyde Park grounds. The method used was that known as "cut and cover" – seeing an expansive open cut trench dug into Hyde Park, more than 100,000 cubic metres (3,500,000 cu ft) of rock and soil removed, the walls of the tunnels and station formed, roofing put in place and the site eventually covered over. Construction of the two station utilised concrete for the walls and steel framework and concrete for the roof.

Costing £2,007,943, Museum station was built as a single main tunnel arch in concrete spanning both east and west platforms and two centre tracks. The station is free of columns and other supporting structures in the European "tube" style tradition. It was decided to rename the station after the nearby Australian Museum before construction was complete. St James station was constructed from concrete with four platforms and four tunnels, only two of which have been used to date. The other two tunnels were intended for a link from Gladesville to the Eastern line which has not eventuated. Central walls with archway openings divide platforms and support the arch roof structures. Concourse areas were formed above the platforms of both stations, acting as focal points for pedestrian ways from street entrances.

=== Interior of Museum station ===
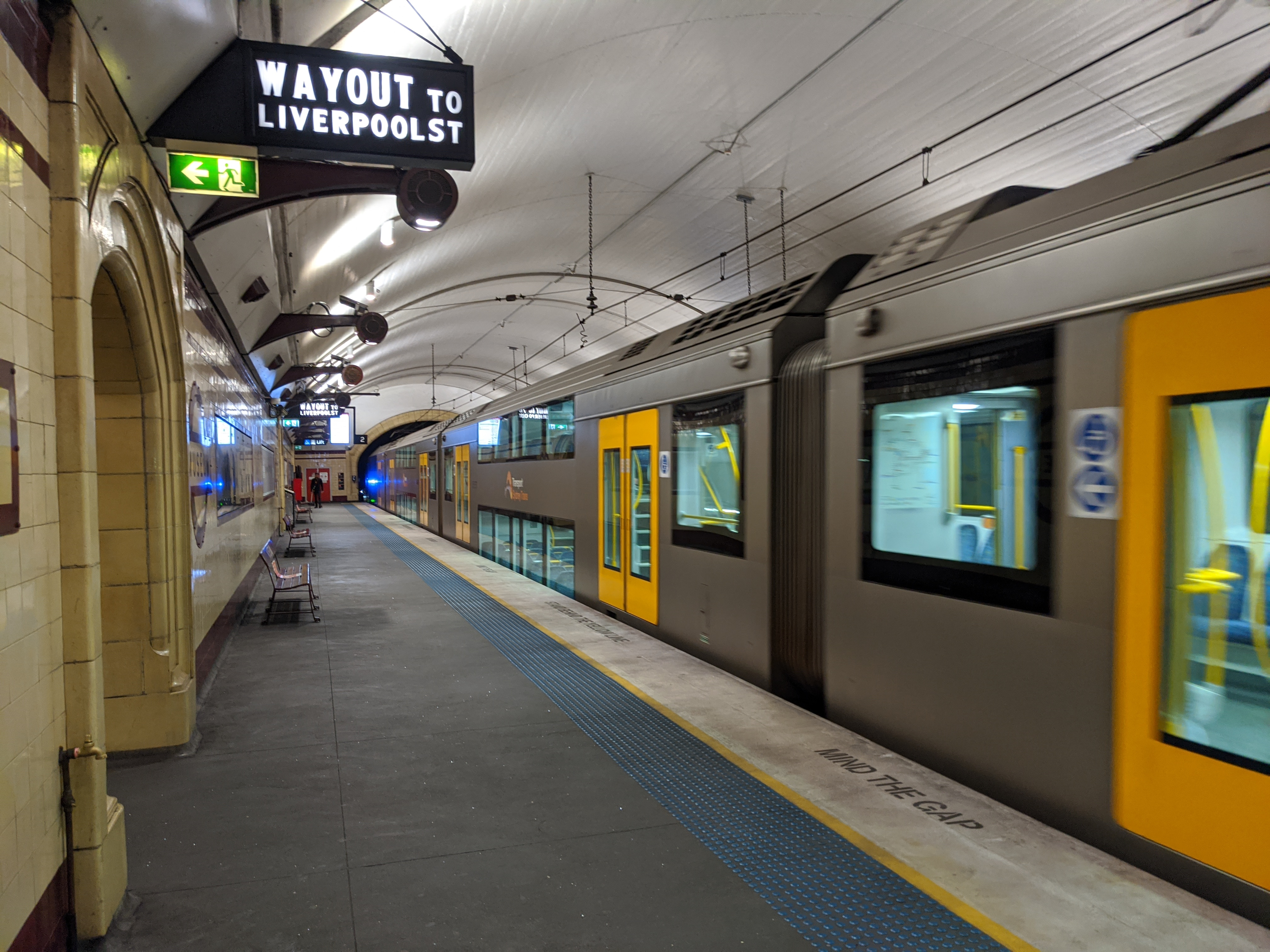
An A Set departing from Platform 2

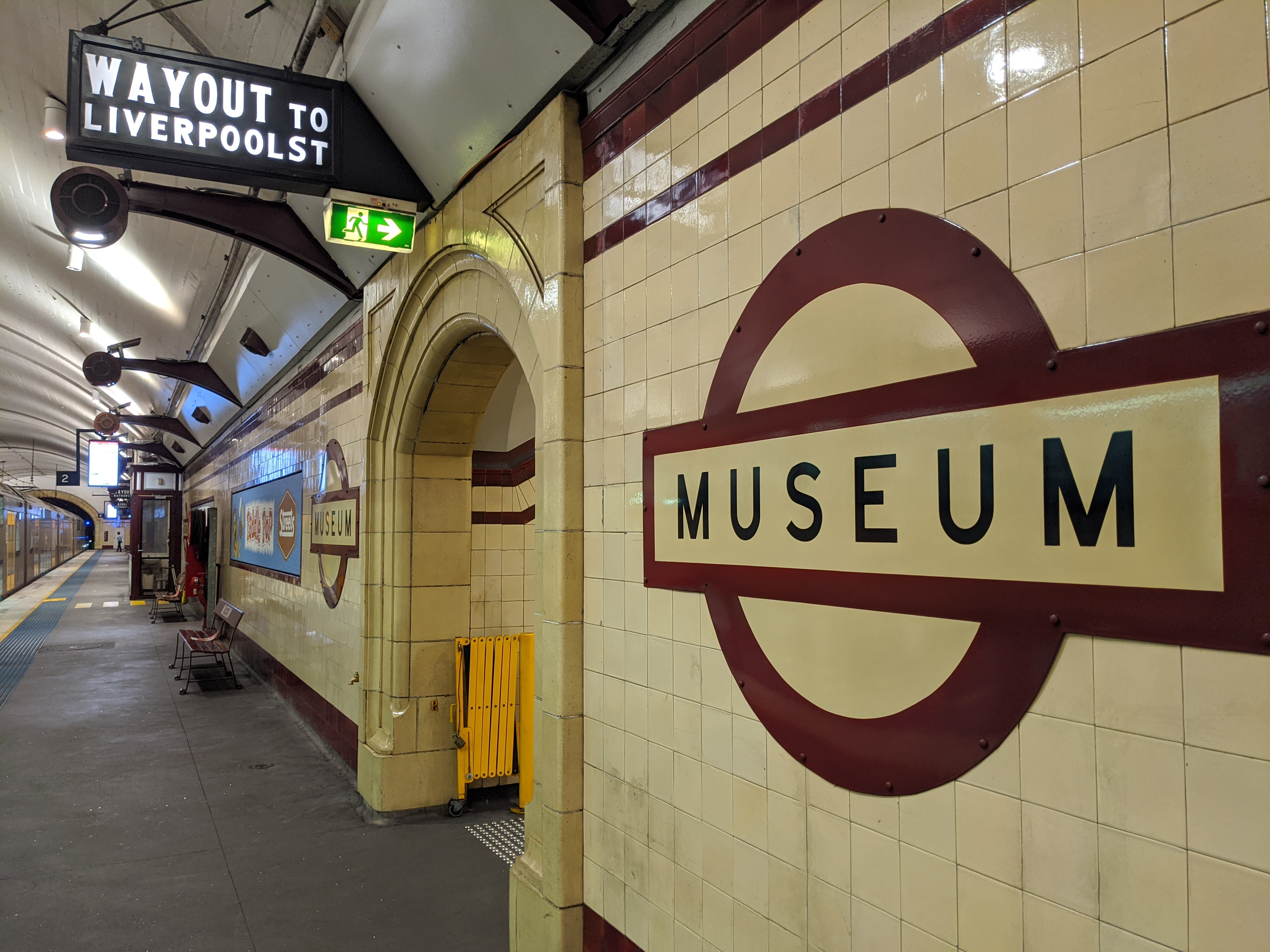
Exit stairway from platform

The interiors of Museum and especially St James station were well detailed, with extensive use of wall tiling and metal stair railings in the style of the period. The main entrances to both stations were each marked by two sandstone and brick entrance buildings designed in the "stripped-classical" style. Entry points led passengers through tiled subway passages to concourse areas.

After several years of construction, newspapers finally heralded the 20 December 1926 opening of Australia's first underground electric railway, when the new line section of Central station, and Museum and St James stations were connected by trains. The railway attracted tens of thousands of people during the first few weeks of its operations, "swarms of interested mothers and fathers, together with their children, thronged the platforms and stairways examining Dr Bradfield's super Christmas box to the public". Media praise for the opening of the two city stations was offset by reporting which focused on the fact that only a small portion of Bradfield's plan was in place. The Evening News of 18 December 1926 stated "the traffic problem, before it becomes far worse, can only be met by the construction of the inner loop of the City railway".

1934 entry and exits to St. James and Museum Stations in Hyde Park South and North built, as the southern portion of Hyde Park was only handed back to Sydney City Council in 1932. St James and Museum were busy stations until 1956 when they were connected by the line through Circular Quay allowing trains to run into the city and back out again without needing to stop and reverse at St James as was previously done. The central two tunnels at St James, built to link with the proposed Eastern Suburbs railway have never been used for train movement although they were, along with the section of tunnel built to connect with Circular Quay, used as air raid shelters during World War II. After 1956 and the opening of Circular Quay station, St James and Museum suffered from reduced passenger usage and peak hours are now only a shadow of those in earlier years.

In the 1960s an outdoor café was constructed behind (north-east) of Museum Station entry building, by Sydney City Council. Design of the café and landscaping were the work of Ilmars Berzins, SCC landscape architect. Although affected by reduced maintenance spending and unsympathetic additions, both stations have retained much of their original detailing and character.

== Design ==
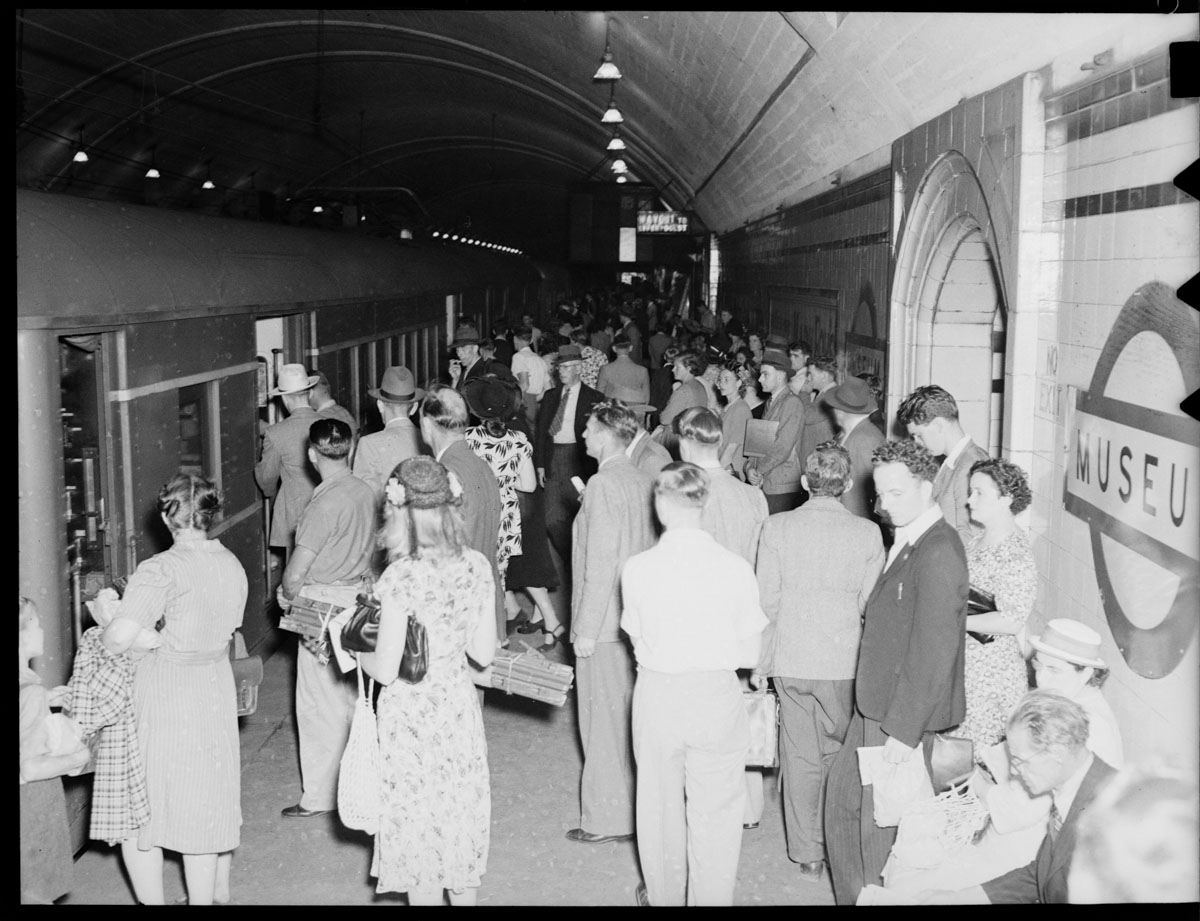
Museum Station crowd on platform, 1948

Designed by John Bradfield in the Inter-War Stripped Classical architectural style, the station comprises two platforms, each 158.5 metres (520 ft) long by 3.8 metres (12 ft) wide, under an arch with span 14.6 metres (48 ft). Museum's signage and cream tiling with maroon highlights are reminiscent of a typical London Underground tube station of the era, however its layout of central tracks under a grand arch are more in keeping with older stations of the Paris Métro. Until the construction of the Airport Line in the 1990s, it was the only underground station in Sydney without an island platform. It is a companion to St James station, both opened at the same time and use a roundel design on their station signage that is similar to the one used on the London Underground. The station opened on 20 December 1926 with the opening of the eastern city line from Central to St James. It became part of the City Circle loop on 22 January 1956.

The main entrance to the station is located at the corner of Elizabeth and Liverpool Streets. Another entrance featuring a sandstone façade is located on the corner of Liverpool and Castlereagh Streets. This entrance sits at the foot of the District Court of New South Wales' Downing Centre, formerly the site of the Mark Foy's department store. Other entrances are also located on three corners of the intersection of Elizabeth and Bathurst Streets.

All exits flow into one of two concourses at the station. The main concourse is the southern one, located near the Elizabeth and Liverpool St intersection. The toilets, station office and lifts are all located in this concourse. The northern concourse is located near the intersection of Elizabeth and Bathurst St, with much less facilities compared to the main concourse. This concourse is used much less than the other one, and so is only open during the daytime on weekdays. At other times, only the southern concourse is open.

There are photos of the station being built and a complete photo history through the pedestrian tunnels of this station. The platforms feature various period advertisements.

Work commenced on the 27 May 2015 on lifts between the street and the concourse level at the Elizabeth and Liverpool Streets entrance with further lifts to the platforms.

== Platforms and services ==
Platform	Line	Stopping pattern	Notes
1	Leppington & Inner West Line	services to Homebush, Parramatta & Leppington	
1	Liverpool & Inner West Line	services to Liverpool via Lidcombe and Regents Park	
2	Airport & South Line	services to Sydenham; 2 weekday evening services to Campbelltown	
2	Airport & South Line	services to Revesby & Macarthur via Airport stations	

== Heritage listing ==
As at 1 November 2010, Museum Station has state significance as the first underground station in Australia (with St James opened the same day) and demonstrates the adaptation of the London tube style station to the Australian situation. The station is well constructed, proportioned and detailed and represents the culmination of many years of political lobbying to have a city railway system in place.

The station complex is an important part of the larger NSW railways network, particularly the inner-city system, and has associations with prominent persons such as JJC Bradfield and organisations such as the Department of Railways. It played an important part in the development of the CBD in Sydney as evidenced by direct pedestrian subway connections to adjacent department stores such as Mark Foys.

The Museum Station entry building (Liverpool Street) is a fine and largely intact example of a small-scale Inter-War Stripped Classical style building which adds to the general character of the immediate area. It has significance as one of two buildings of its type and style remaining in the city (the other being St James). The combination of the entry portals, pedestrian subways and decorative interiors including light fittings, tiling and signage contribute to the aesthetic significance of the place and evoke a former era of railway travel.

Museum railway station was listed on the New South Wales State Heritage Register on 2 April 1999 having satisfied the following criteria.

The place is important in demonstrating the course, or pattern, of cultural or natural history in New South Wales.

Historic value encompasses the history of aesthetics, science and society and therefore, to a large extent underlines all of the terms set out. A place may have historic value because it has influenced or has been influenced by a historic figure, event, phase or activity. It may also have historic value as the site of an important event. Significance is greater when associated evidence survives in-situ or when the settings are substantially intact.

- The site of St James station is associated with early plans for a terminus for the city railway system.
- St James, along with Museum station were the first underground railway stations operating in Australia.
- St James station is strongly associated with the railway/transportation planning of prominent early 20th century engineer Dr J. J. C. Bradfield.
- Unused tunnels at both ends of St James station were blocked off with concrete walls to form bomb shelters as a precaution against possible air raids during World War II.

The place is important in demonstrating aesthetic characteristics and/or a high degree of creative or technical achievement in New South Wales.

Aesthetic value includes aspects of sensory perception including consideration of the form, scale, colour, texture and material of the fabric.

- The sandstone entry or portal building is a representative example of a low scale public building in the inter-war "stripped classical" style.
- The interior of the station, with its generous provision of space has retained most of its original detailing including tiling, balustrading, signage and other fixtures and fittings.
- The two (one demolished in the 1970s) portal buildings to St James were designed to integrate with, yet inversely reflect, the two original portal buildings of Museum station.
- The largely underground nature of St James station does not detract from the streetscape or parkland environment of the area.
- The location of the station at the head of Market Street has an important civic sense and street vista value.

The place has a strong or special association with a particular community or cultural group in New South Wales for social, cultural or spiritual reasons.

Social value embraces the qualities for which a place has become a focus of political, national, regional, local or other cultural sentiment to a majority or minority group.

- The construction and utilization of St James Station represents approximately 70 years of pressure by citizens for city railway stations from the 1850s onwards.
- The underground nature of the station is a product of citizens' concern over possible loss of Hyde Park land.
- St James station, when linked to the rest of the city rail network from 1926 onwards was considered as important in enabling ease of transportation to the city and thereby allowing workers to live in more "healthy conditions" in suburbs further afield than was usual at the time.
- St James station, and the rest of the city rail network by enabling ease of transportation for workers into the city, is thought to have contributed to the expansion of Sydney's suburbia from the early to mid 20th century onwards.
- St James station, and the rest of the city underground network, is representative of a facility designed to cater for the future transportation of Sydney's citizens.

The place has potential to yield information that will contribute to an understanding of the cultural or natural history of New South Wales.

The scientific or research value of a place depends on the data involved, its rarity, quality or representativeness, and on the degree to which the place may contribute further information.

- St James station demonstrates a period of railway technology in New South Wales and Australia as a whole.
- The scale and methods of construction work especially excavation, completed for the station represented a major feat of engineering at the time.

== Gallery ==
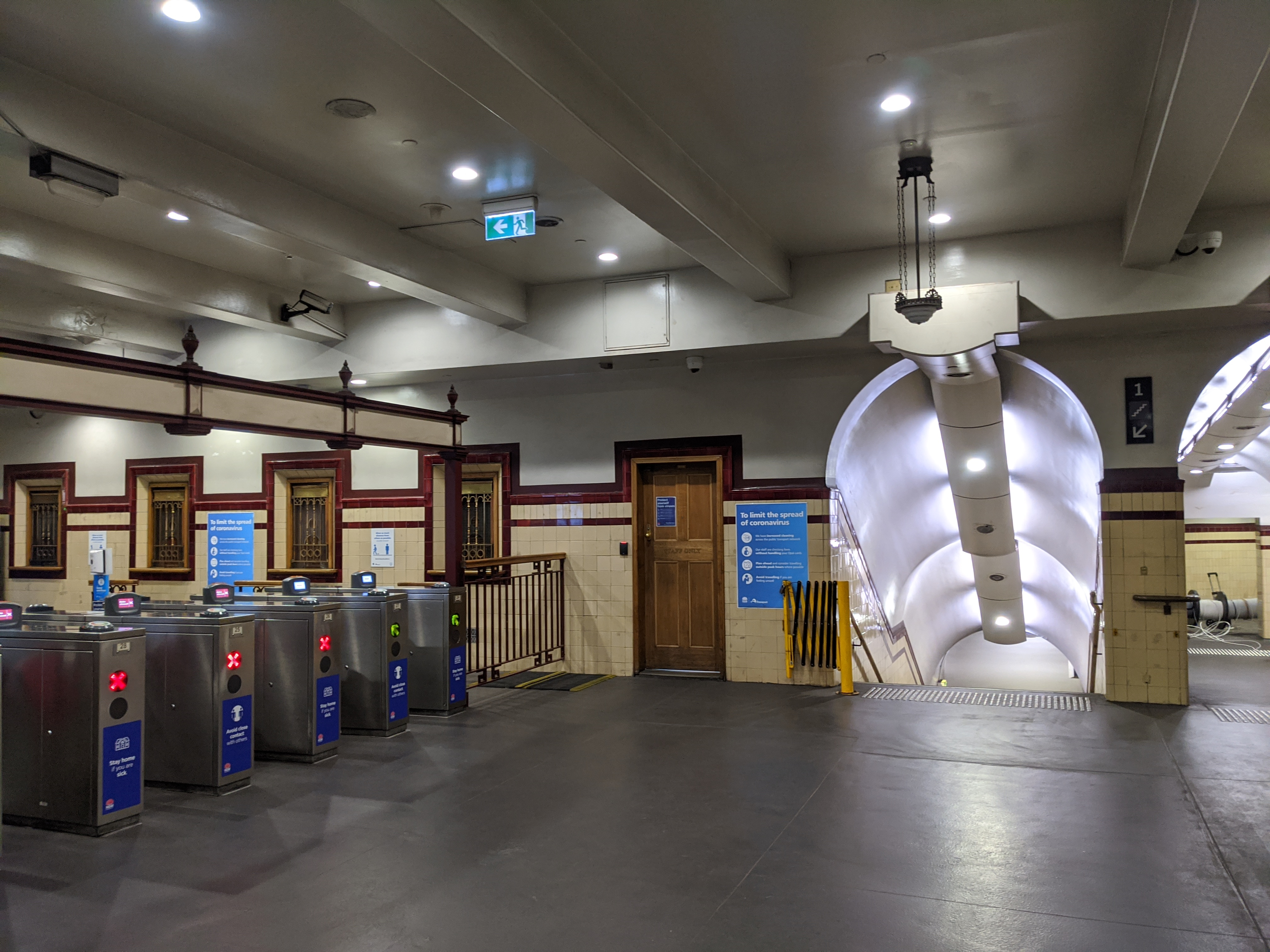
Concourse and ticketing gates, May 2020

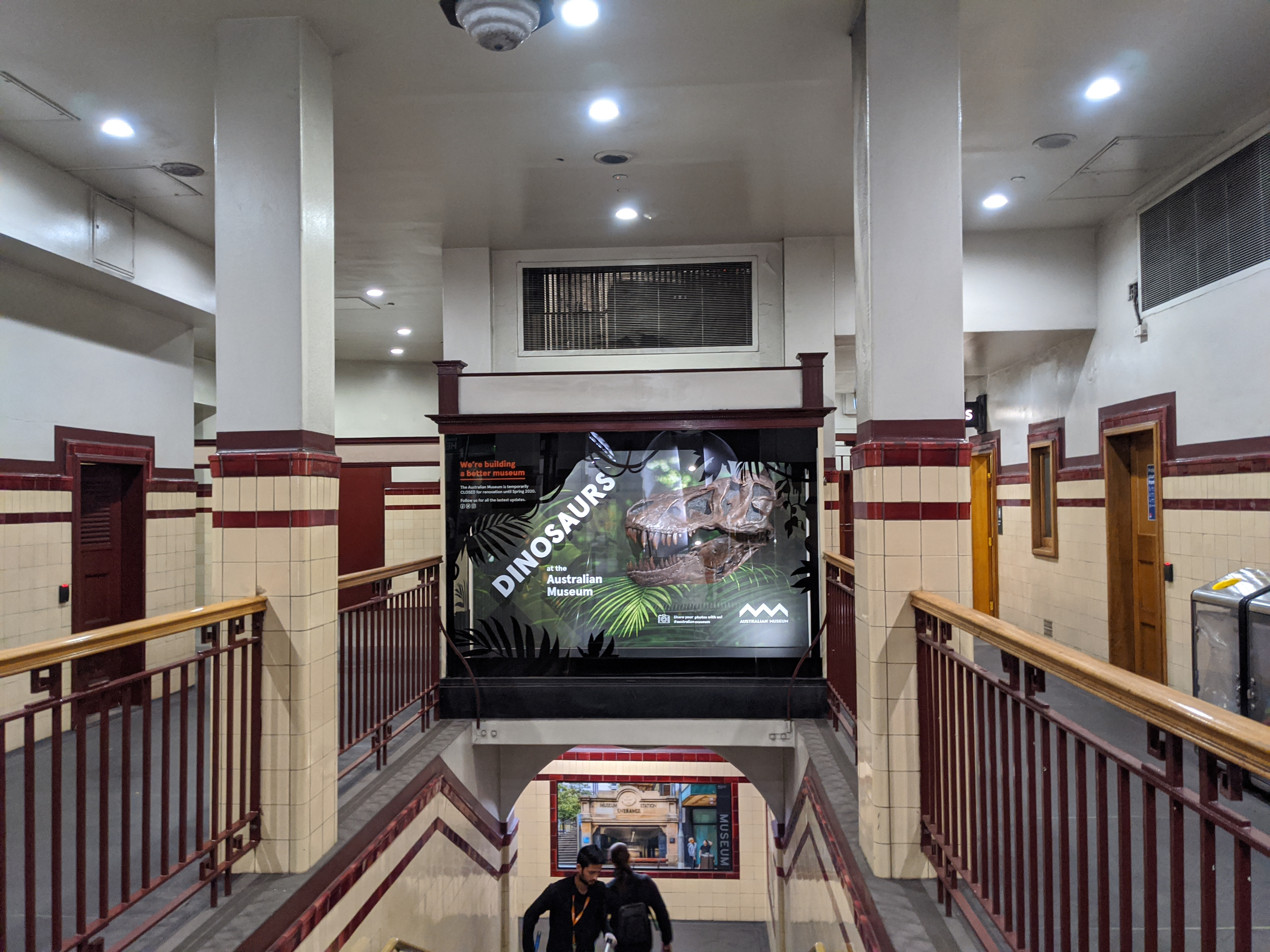
Stairway down to platforms, May 2020

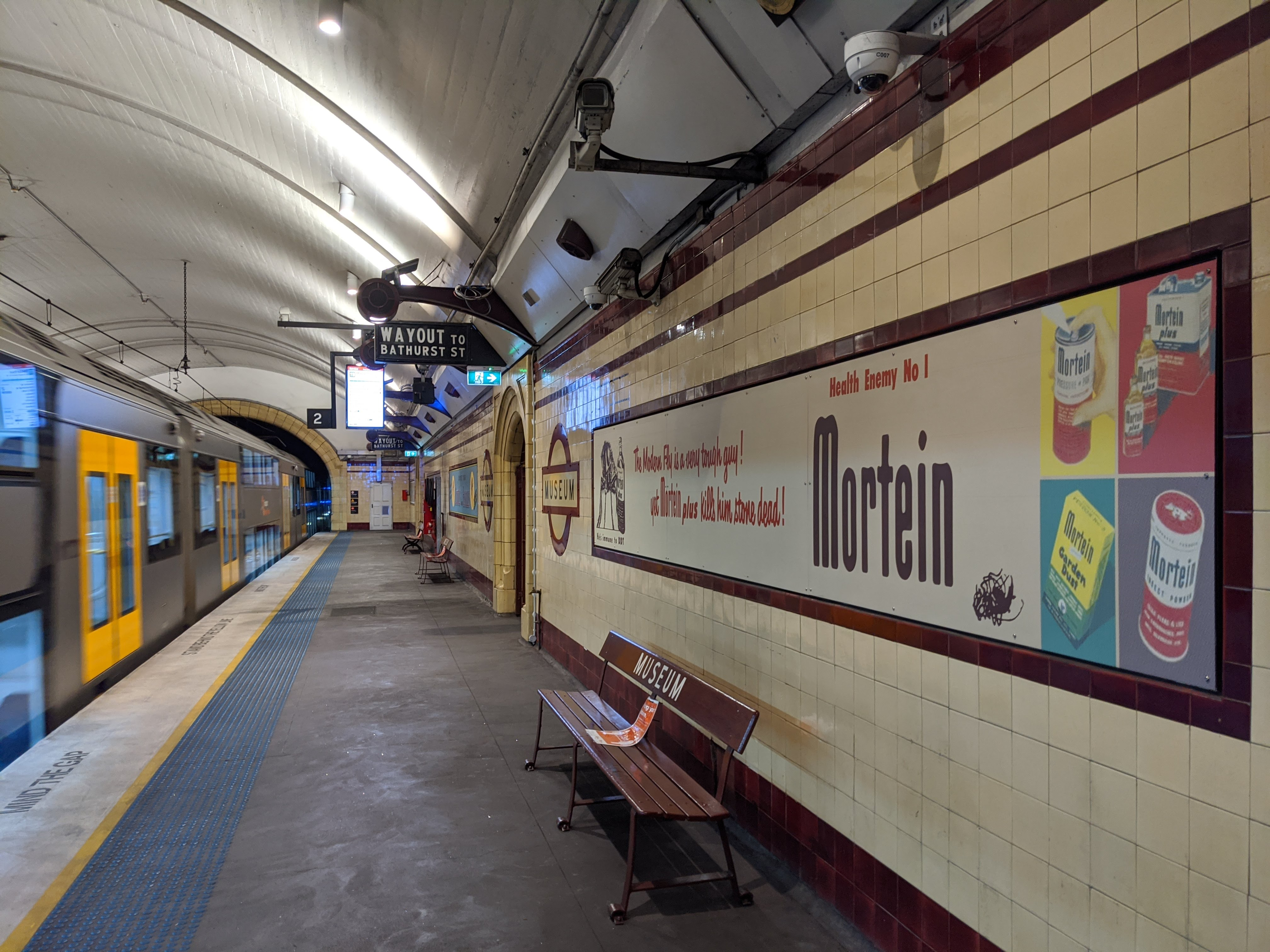
View of Platform 2, May 2020

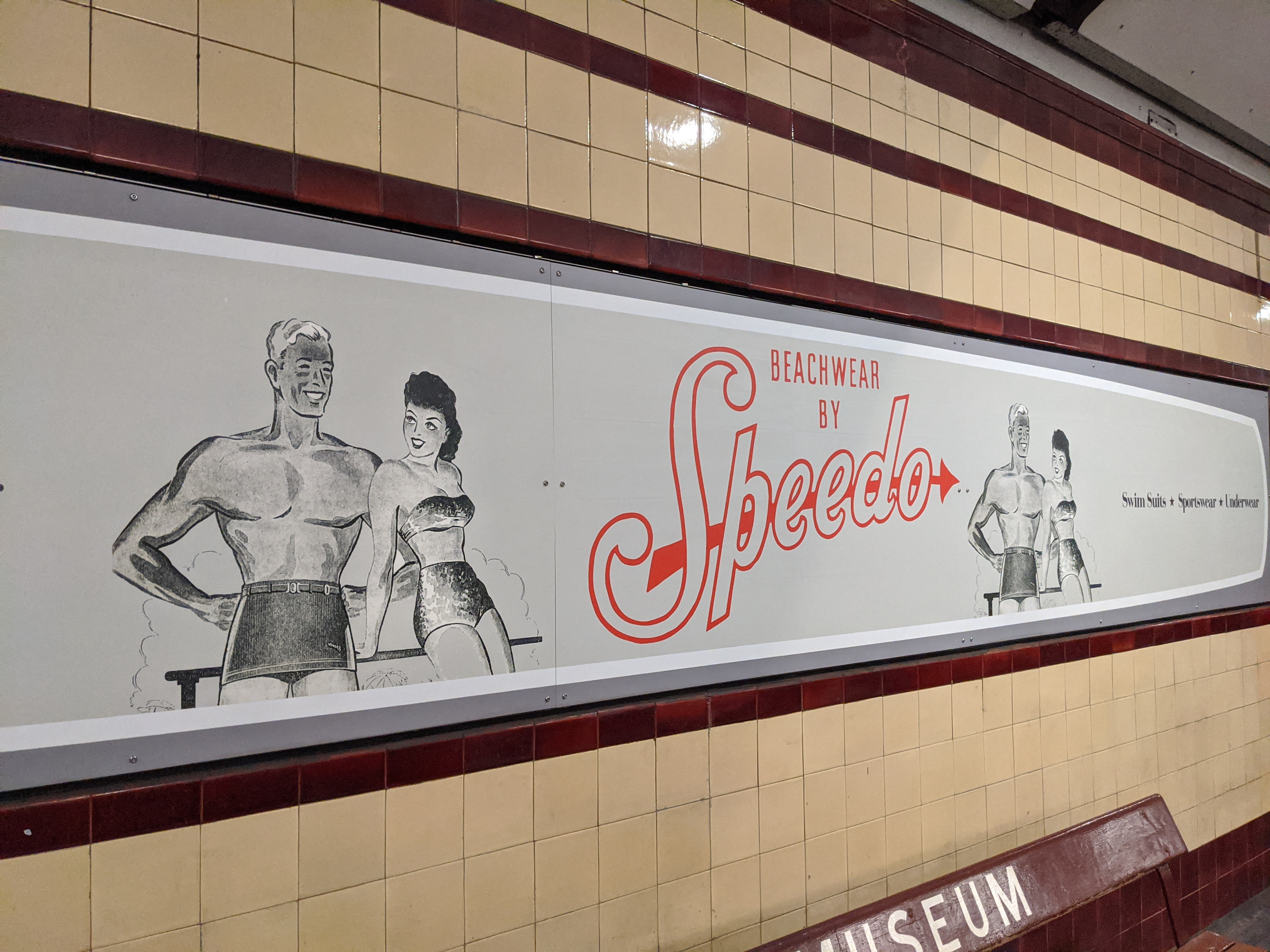
Speedos vintage advertising, May 2020

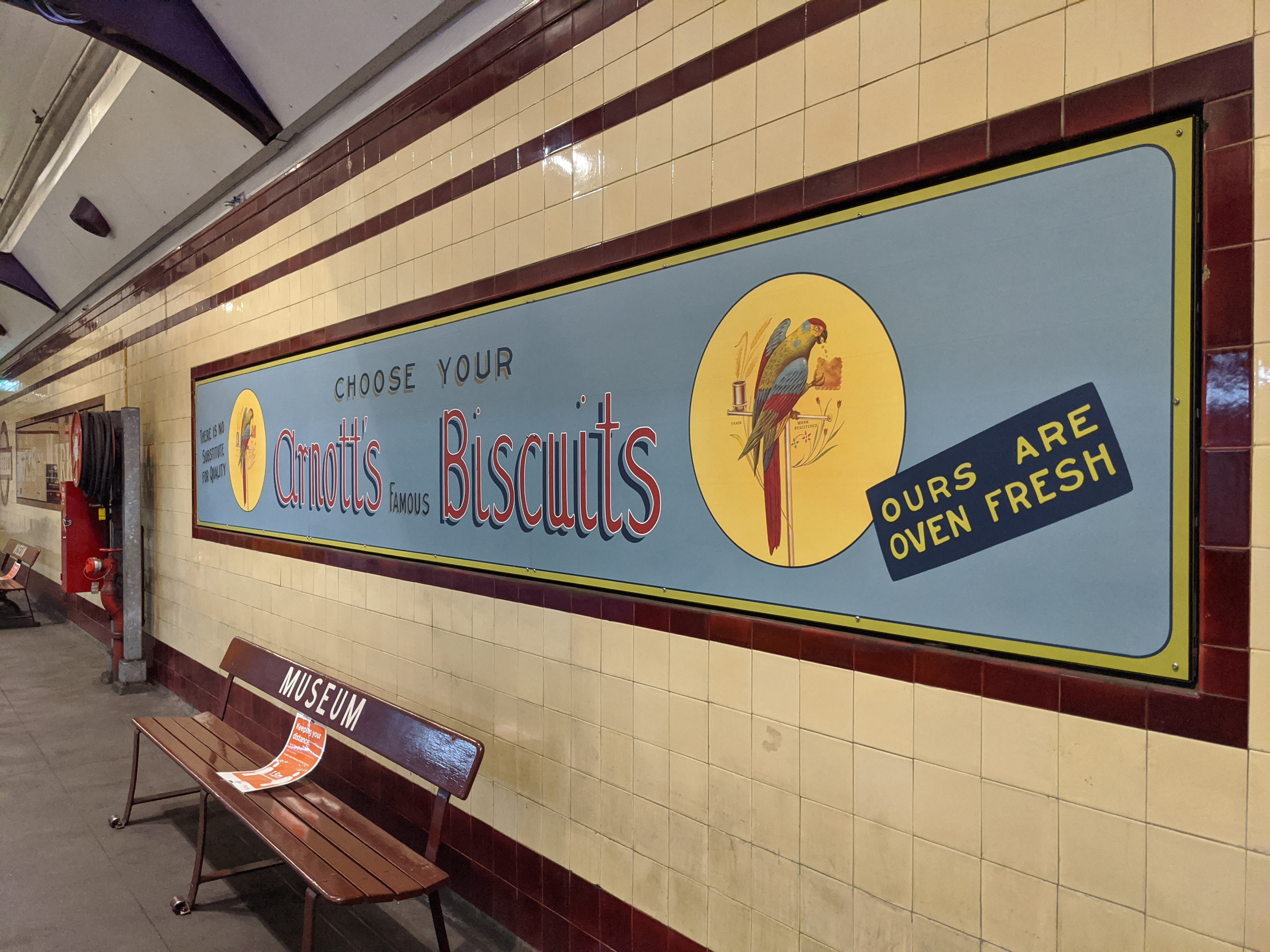
Arnott's biscuits vintage advertising, May 2020

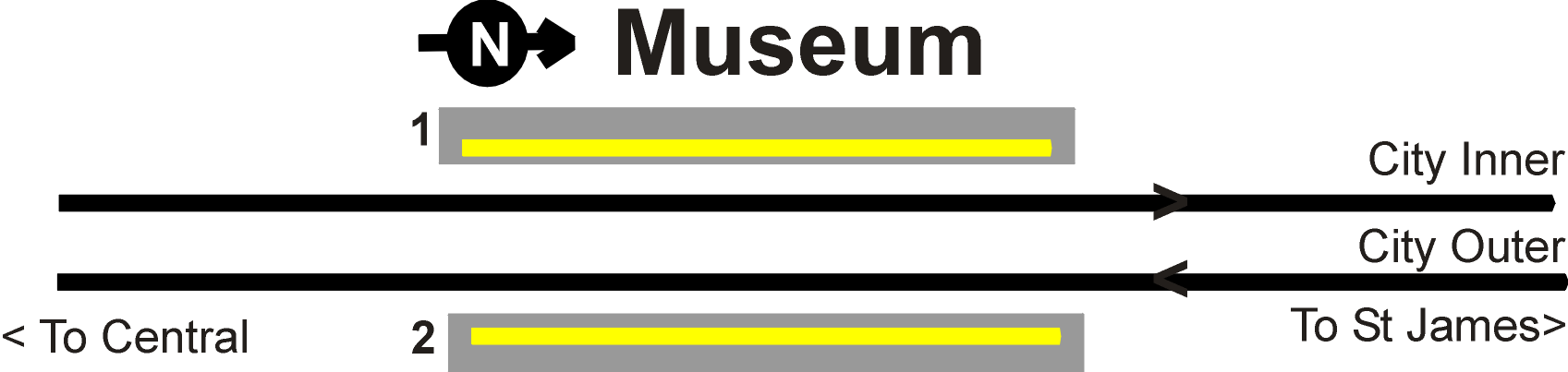
Station trackplan

== See also ==
- Architecture of Sydney
- List of Sydney Trains railway stations
- Railways in Sydney
- Rail transport in New South Wales
- Sydney underground railways
