= Castlereagh Street =

Street in Sydney, Australia

Castlereagh Street, Sydney New South Wales
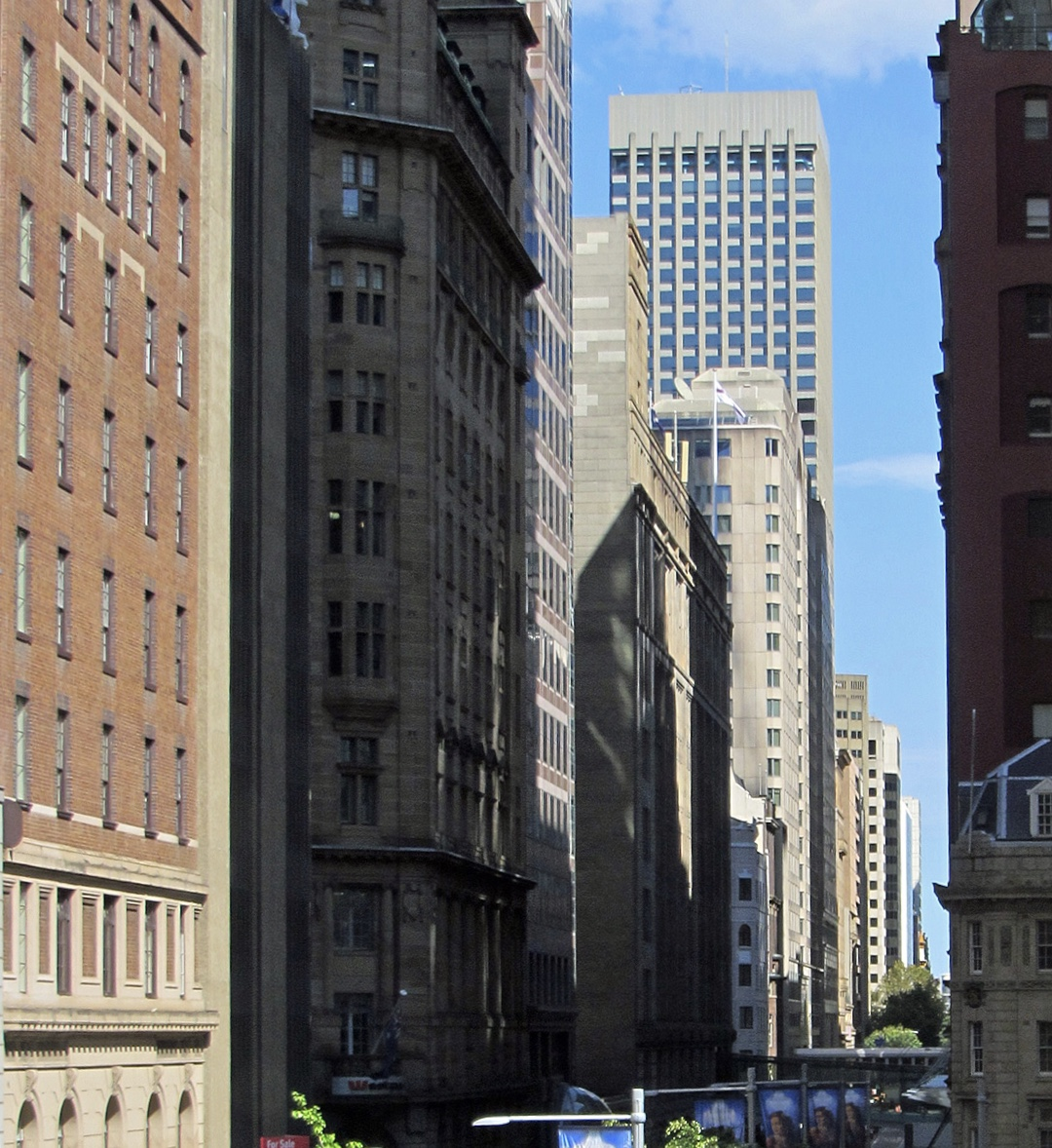
- Castlereagh Street looking north
- A map of the Sydney CBD showing Castlereagh Street
- Coordinates: 33°51′59″S 151°12′36″E (Northern end); 33°52′49″S 151°12′30″E (Southern end)

General information
- Type: Street
- Location: Sydney
- Length: 1.6 km (1.0 mi)

Major junctions
- Northern end: Bligh Street; Sydney CBD
- Hunter Street; Martin Place; King Street; Market Street; Park Street; Bathurst Street; Liverpool Street; Goulburn Street
- Southern end: Hay Street; Haymarket, Sydney

Location(s)
- LGA(s): City of Sydney
- Major suburbs: Sydney CBD

Castlereagh Street is a 1.6-kilometre-long (1 mi) major street located in the Sydney central business district in New South Wales, Australia. The street runs north-to-south, in a one way direction only.

== Description ==
Castlereagh Street's northern terminus is at the junction of Hunter Street, with its southern terminus at the junction with Hay Street, near Belmore Park. The street is one-way southbound to motorised traffic, with a bicycle path running in both directions from King Street to Hay Street.

At its northern end near Martin Place, the street is lined by many of Sydney's most expensive boutiques and jewellery stores, such as Brunello Cucinelli, Bvlgari, Bottega Veneta, Chanel, Cartier, Dior, Dolce & Gabbana, Gucci, Hermes, Missoni, Mont Blanc, Prada, Van Cleef & Arpels and Ermenegildo Zegna.

== Etymology ==
Previously Chapel Row and Camden Street, Castlereagh Street was named by Governor Macquarie in 1810 in honour of Viscount Castlereagh, the Secretary of State for the Colonies. At the time the street included what is now known as Loftus Street, named as Castlereagh Street North, until 1881, and what is now known as Chalmers Street, prior to the establishment of Belmore Park, until 1905.

== History ==
Castlereagh Street once contained the Australia Hotel, whose foundation stone was laid by Sir Henry Parkes, and the Theatre Royal. Both of these buildings were demolished during the 1970s to make way for the MLC Centre.

The Circular Quay to Central station line was an important part of the Sydney tram network. It was an extremely busy service for passengers transferring from suburban trains, particularly prior to the opening of the City Circle underground railway line in 1926. Trams operated in a loop from Central station, running north along Pitt Street to Circular Quay returning south via Castlereagh Street. These tracks were also used by some eastern and south-western routes during busy periods. The line closed on 27 September 1957 with four tram services replaced with buses and three others diverted to operate via Elizabeth Street. The line made use of the sandstone viaduct onto the colonnade above Eddy Avenue at Central station, which since 1997 has formed part of the Inner West Light Rail.

Having previously operated as a one-way street in a northerly direction, in February 1987 Castlereagh Street was changed to operate in a southerly direction. In 1997, a bus lane was introduced between Hunter and Bathurst Streets.

Renowned theatre architects Lewis Kaberry and Clifford M. Chard practised from offices at no. 67, and both continued to do so after the dissolution of their partnership (which began around 1920) in 1940.

Significant heritage buildings located on Castlreagh Street include, from north to south:

- The Trust Building: 72–72a Castlereagh Street, located on the corner of King Street, and constructed between 1914 and 1916. The building is an example of the Interwar Commercial Palazzo architectural style and was the site of the former Daily Telegraph offices and is one of four surviving newspaper offices built between 1900 and 1930. The building is listed on the NSW State Heritage Register.
- Metropolitan Fire Station: 211–217 Castlereagh Street, located south of the intersection with Bathurst Street, and constructed from 1887. Partially designed by James Barnet, the building is an example of the Victorian Free Classical architectural style and has been used continuously since 1888 as a fire station by the NSW Fire Brigades. The building is listed on the NSW State Heritage Register.
- Downing Centre: 302 Castlereagh Street, located with an entire city block bounded by Castlereagh, Liverpool, Elizabeth and Goulburn Streets, and constructed from 1908. Designed by Arthur Anderson, the building is an example of the Interwar Stripped Classical architectural style and was the site of the former Mark Foy's emporium. The building is listed on the NSW State Heritage Register.

== Gallery ==
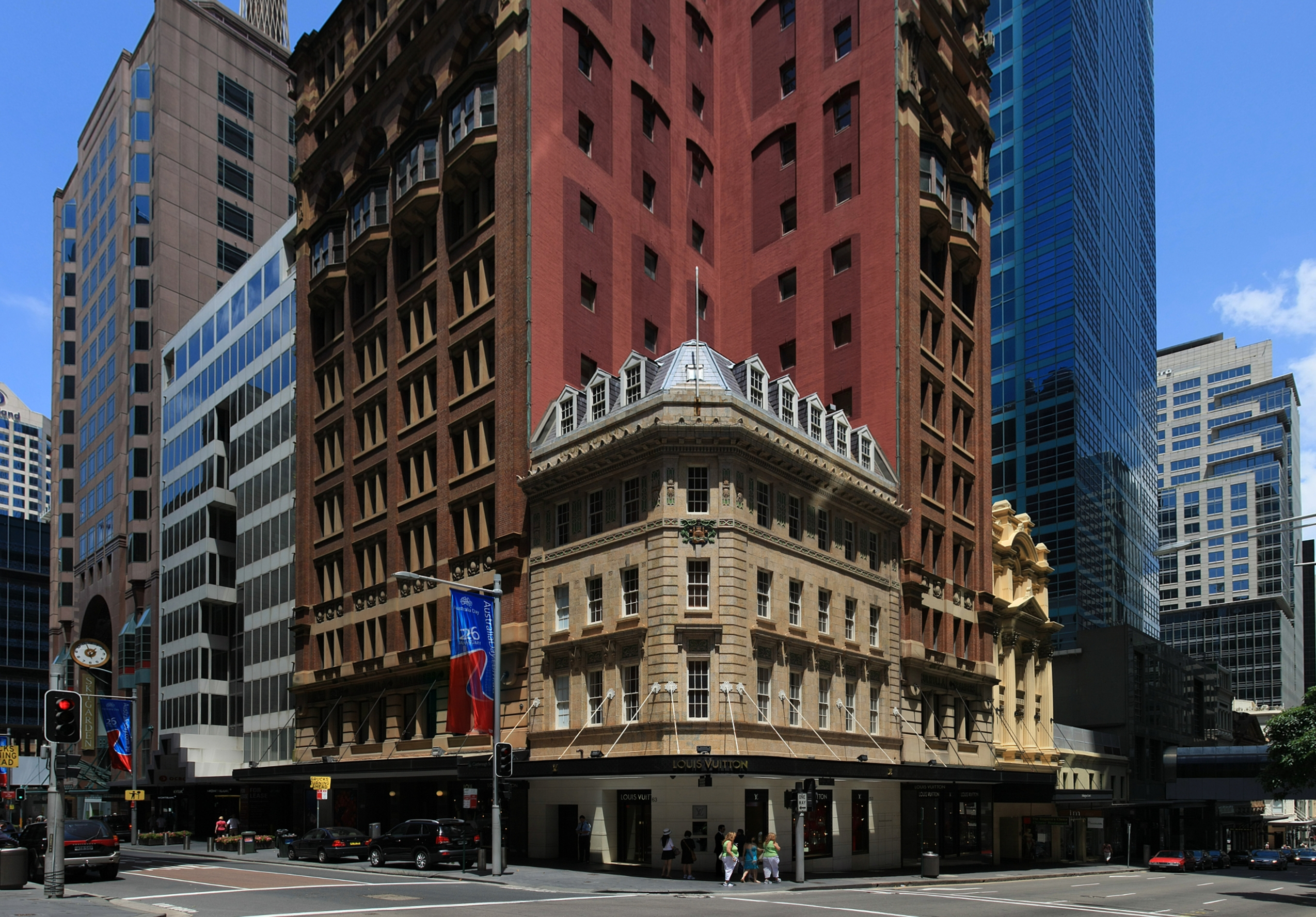
Castlereagh Street on the left and King Street to the right.

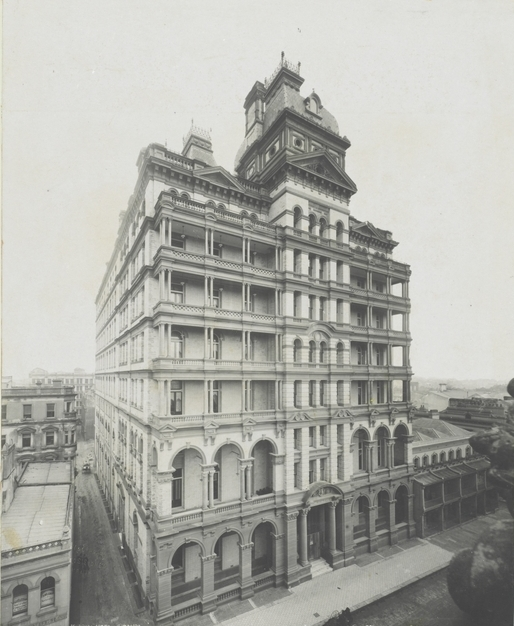
The former iconic Australia Hotel in 1932, known as the 'Hotel of the Commonwealth' was demolished in 1971.

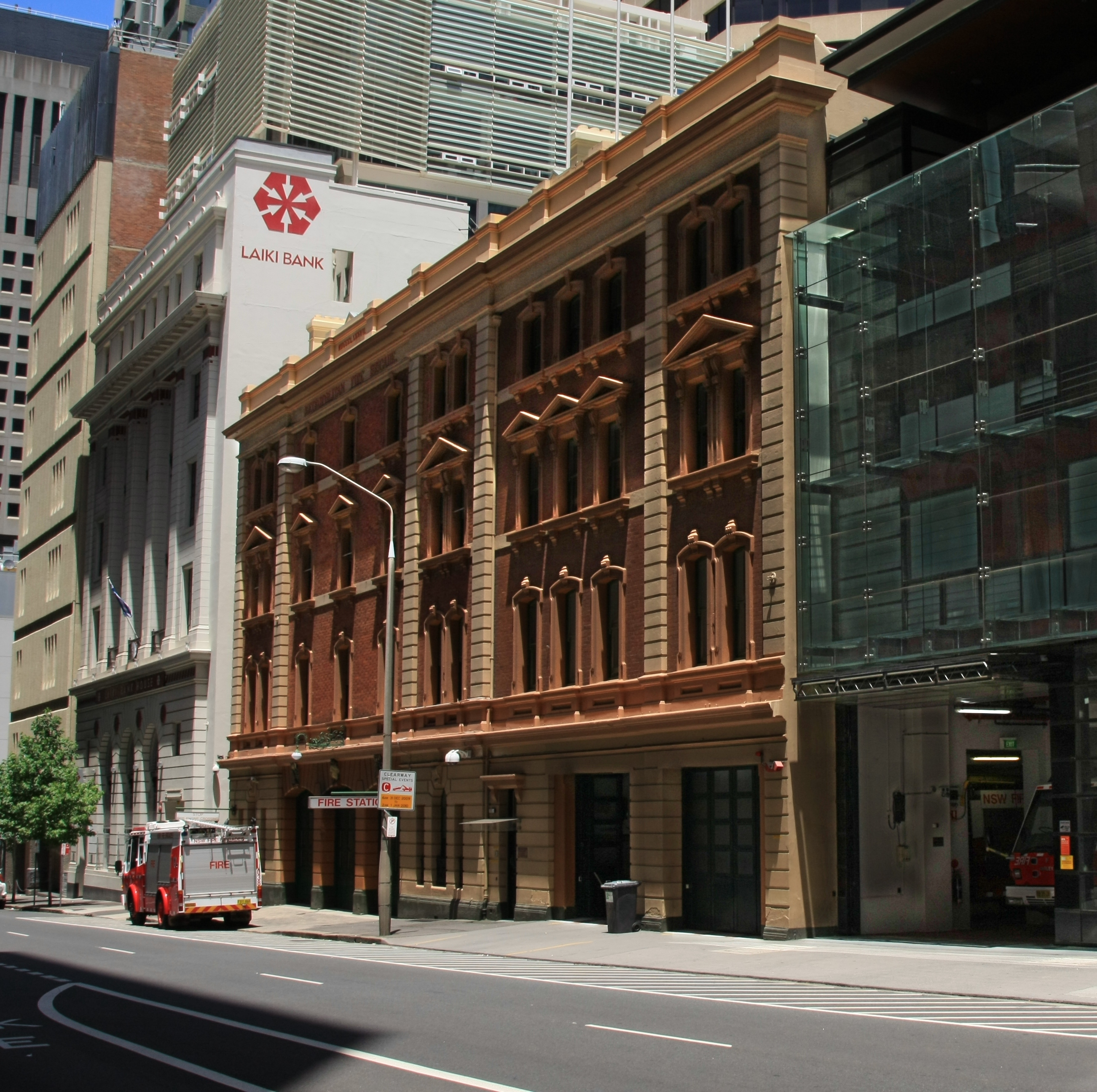
The Metropolitan Fire Station in Castlereagh Street, operated continually since 1888 as a first station by Fire and Rescue NSW.

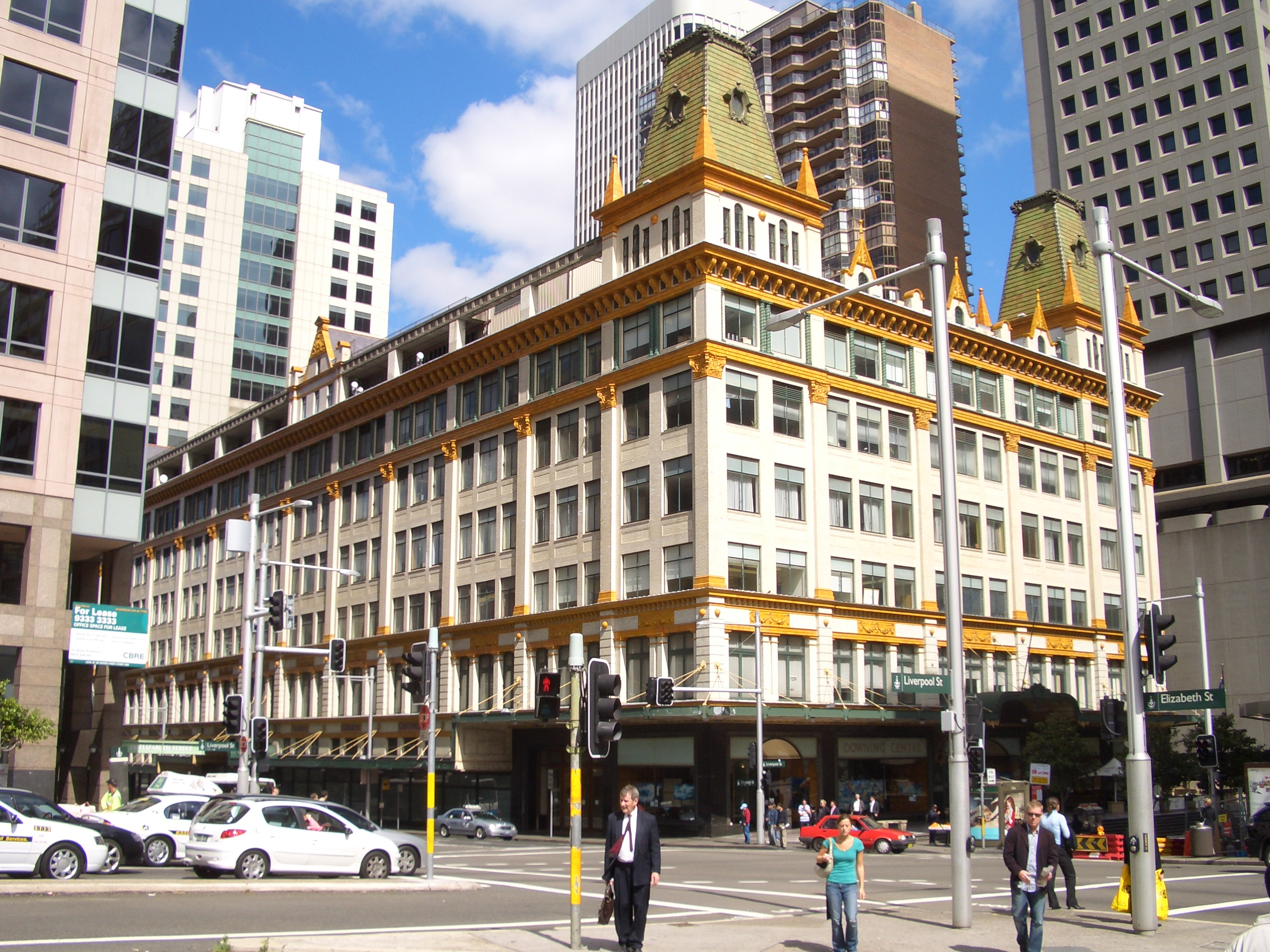
Downing Centre, between Liverpool and Goulburn Streets.
