= Goulburn Street =

Street in Sydney, Australia

Goulburn Street, Sydney New South Wales
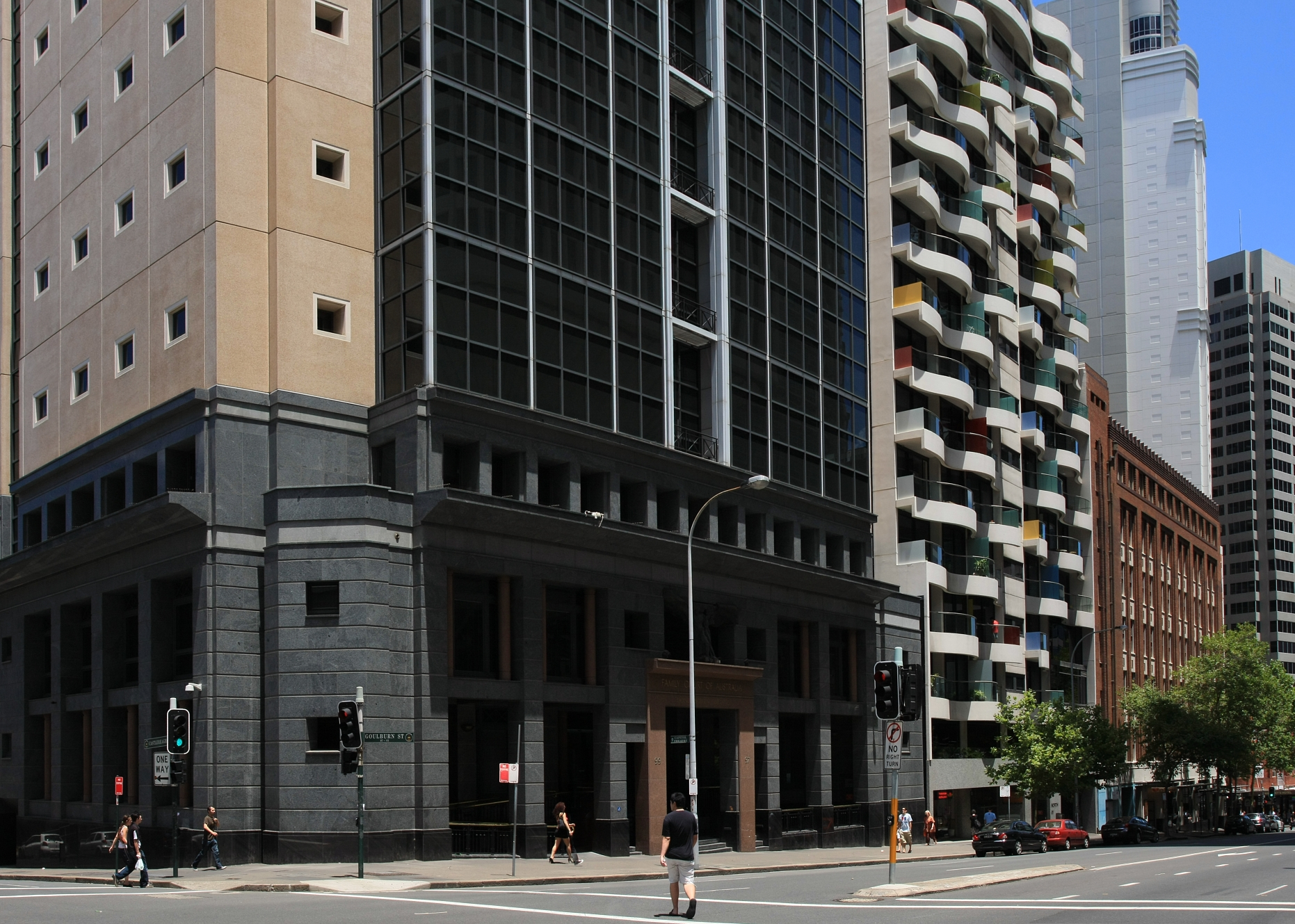
- Lionel Bowen Building
- Coordinates: 33°52′38″S 151°12′12″E (West end); 33°52′48″S 151°12′54″E (East end)

General information
- Type: Street
- Length: 1.1 km (0.7 mi)

Major junctions
- West end: Harbour Street; Haymarket, Sydney
- Sussex Street; George Street; Pitt Street; Castlereagh Street; Elizabeth Street; Wentworth Avenue
- East end: Crown Street; Darlinghurst, Sydney

Goulburn Street is a street in the central business district of Sydney in New South Wales, Australia. Goulburn Street is in the southern portion of the Sydney central business district and runs from Darling Harbour and Chinatown in the west, to Crown Street in the east at Darlinghurst and Surry Hills.

Notable buildings include World Square, the Lionel Bowen Building of the Family Court of Australia, the Sydney Masonic Centre and the Sydney Police Centre.

At the corner of Goulburn and Elizabeth Streets is the only car park operated by Sydney City Council within the CBD. It was the first air rights car park in Australia, opening in 1963 over six tracks of the City Circle line.
