= Hydro Majestic Hotel =

Hotel in Medlow Bath, NSW, Australia

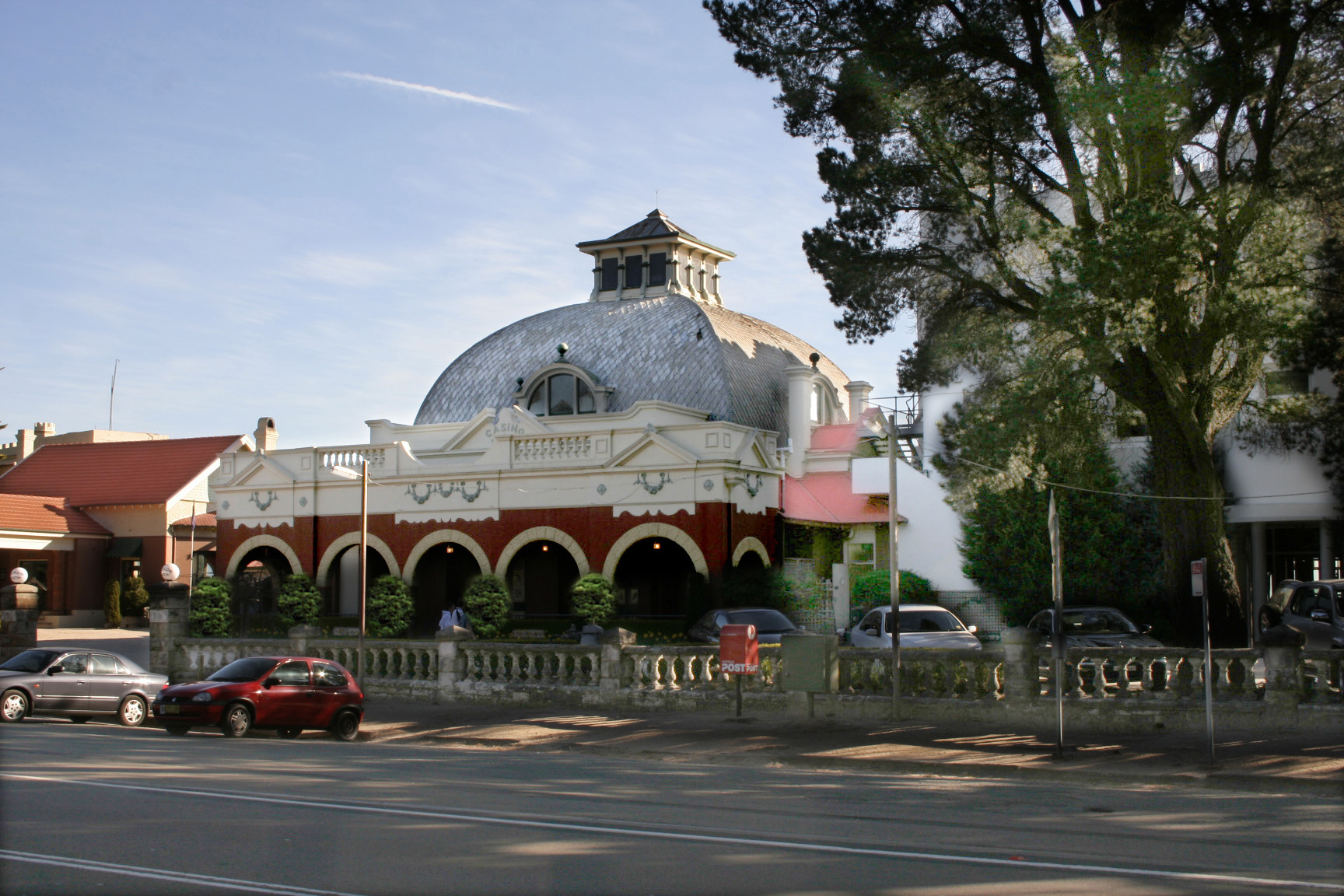
- Hydro Majestic Hotel Casino dome in 2007

General information
- Location: 52-88 Great Western Highway, Medlow Bath, Australia
- Coordinates: 33°40′32.85″S 150°16′51.08″E
- Opening: 1891 (Belgravia Hotel); 1904 (Hydro Majestic)

Website
- https://www.hydromajestic.com.au/

The Hydro Majestic Hotel is located in Medlow Bath, New South Wales, Australia. The hotel is located on a clifftop overlooking the Megalong Valley on the western side of the Great Western Highway.

The hotel is heritage listed and is notable for its unusual mix of architectural styles, including Art Deco and Edwardian. One key feature is the Casino dome (pictured). The dome was bought in Chicago and shipped to Australia, before being shipped to the Blue Mountains by bullock train and reassembled at the site.

== History ==
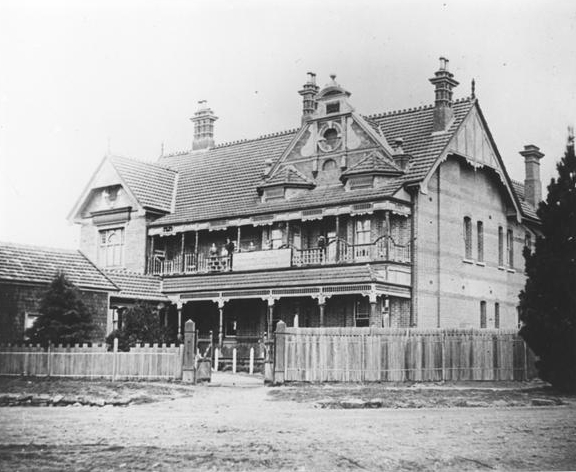
The Belgravia Hotel ca. 1910

The Australian retailer Mark Foy began to purchase the site in 1902 for the purposes of a hydropathic sanatorium under the belief that the land contained mineral springs.

The Hydro Majestic site was originally three different land holdings and their buildings. The first was the country retreat of W.H. Hargraves, registrar in Equity and a trustee of the Australian Museum in Sydney, son of the man who claimed credit for the discovery of gold in New South Wales in 1851. The single-storey house, with elaborate tree and shrub plantings, was bought by Mark Foy in 1901 and developed into the Hargravia section of the Hydro.

The second was the hotel. It began as the Belgravia Hotel which was completed in 1891. The hotel was a health retreat and the building was constructed in Queen Anne style. It was owned and operated by Mr and Mrs Ellis and was acquired by Mark Foy in 1903.

The third was a cottage owned by Alfred Tucker, whose widow later ran the Wonderland Park guesthouse to the north of the gatekeeper's cottage. At that stage the town was known as "Medlow" and Mark Foy successfully petitioned the New South Wales government to change the name to Medlow Bath, the current name. It is not known if he requested the name change to make it sound more prestigious, or if he wanted to avoid confusion with another town called Medlow, also in New South Wales.

Foy spared no expense, building gardens, bringing in his own herd of cows for milk, and not a man to be bested, is said to have had electricity and a working telephone four days before metropolitan Sydney.

By the time the hotel opened in 1904, the mineral springs (if they ever existed) had dried up. Mark Foy had mineral water imported from Germany in large steel containers. After travelling in these containers from Germany to Australia the water reportedly tasted awful, and so it was assumed that it must have been good for a person's health. Guests of the hotel were instructed to drink this water on a regular basis.

By 1906, the popularity of this sort of health retreat had passed and Mark Foy set about rebranding the establishment as a luxury retreat, renaming it the Hydro Majestic. All health treatments and remedies were removed from all advertising, although many remained available on request.

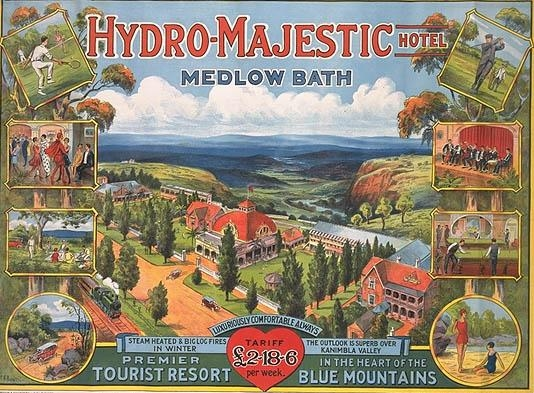
Poster advertising the hotel from the 1920s

In October 1913, it was reported that Foy had sold the property to businessman and NSW parliamentarian James Joynton Smith for a reputed £60,600.

During World War II a building on the grounds was turned over to the 118 General Hospital for U.S. troops.

Fire destroyed the gallery building in 1905, the laundry in 1912, and the original Belgravia wing in 1922. Being surrounded by the Blue Mountains National Park, bushfires have regularly threatened the hotel. Bushfires were extremely close to the hotel again on 8 December 2002.

=== Heritage listing and restoration ===
The hotel received heritage listing in 1984. After many decades of decline and neglect the Hydro Majestic underwent a series of refurbishments during the 1990s. The AccorHotels group became associated with the hotel from about 2002 until 2006 and then a smaller Malaysian-based group took over the running of the hotel, borrowing the name "Hydro Majestic" to brand their other hotels in Asia. In 2008, the hotel was closed for refurbishment, with the new owners to allow the hotel to be restored and add new facilities. The owners, Huong Nguyen and George Saad are said to have paid $11 million for the property and have spent $30 million on the refurbishment.

=== Development in 2012–2014 ===
The owners of the hotel announced in late 2012 the redevelopment of the Hydro Majestic Hotel. It was reopened October 2014. Stage One includes the majority of the historic areas from the Casino to the southern end of the site and new construction, re-planting, and beautification of the gardens including the avenue of Pines and the renovation of the Hotel façade, which has a 1.1 km frontage to the Megalong Valley escarpment. In the renovated Hotel, the historic Casino building became the Casino Lobby, a grand lobby entry and function room. A renovated area behind the Casino Lobby became a five-star restaurant called The Wintergarden. The other historic buildings, The Billiard Room, The Cat's Alley, The Majestic Ballroom in Hargraves House, and the Delmonte conference rooms were renovated.

=== Development in Stage Two 2017 ===
Stage Two of the development, planned to commence around two years after the completion of Stage One will construct the new accommodation wings and a large spa complex. The Belgravia Lounge will be the final old building to be renovated. The reconstruction of the Belgravia Wing and addition of the new Mark Foy Wing will add luxury suites to the Hydro Majestic Hotel.

After stage two the Hydro Majestic Hotel will have one of the largest spa complexes in the southern hemisphere. The second stage will also include the renovation of the heritage rooms in the existing Delmonte and Hargravia buildings. The Cat's Alley will be extended with a new restaurant to be known as the Flying Fox fine dining restaurant.

In May 2023 Salter Brothers Hospitality acquired The Escarpment Group's portfolio, including the Hydro Majestic.

== Casino ==
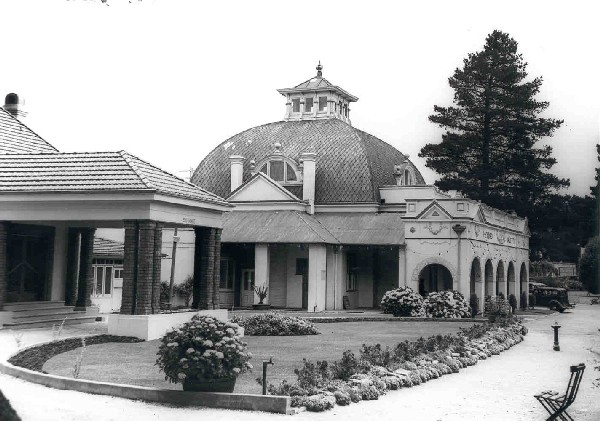
The distinctive dome of the casino in 1938

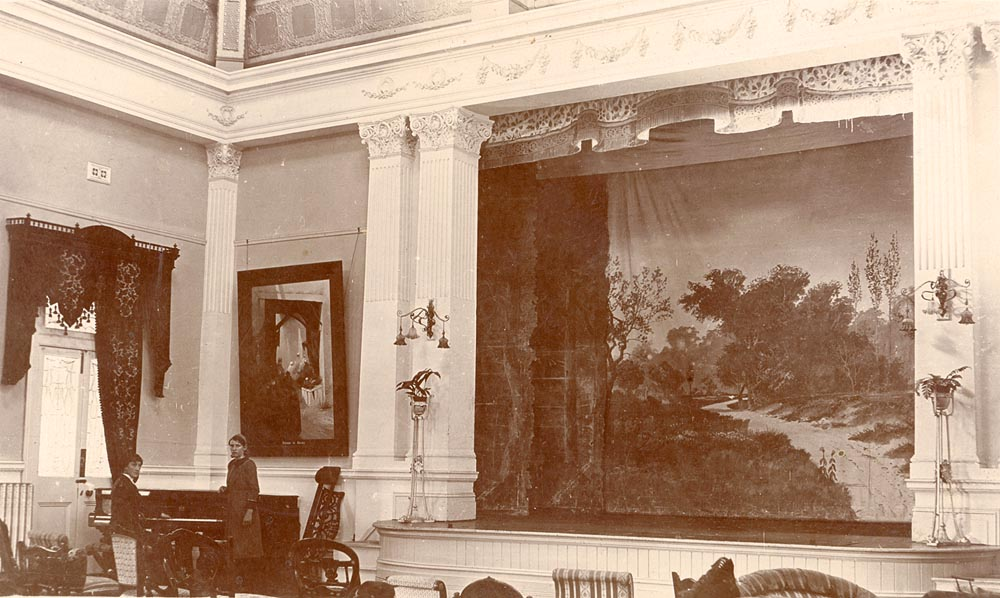
Interior of the Casino, early 1900s

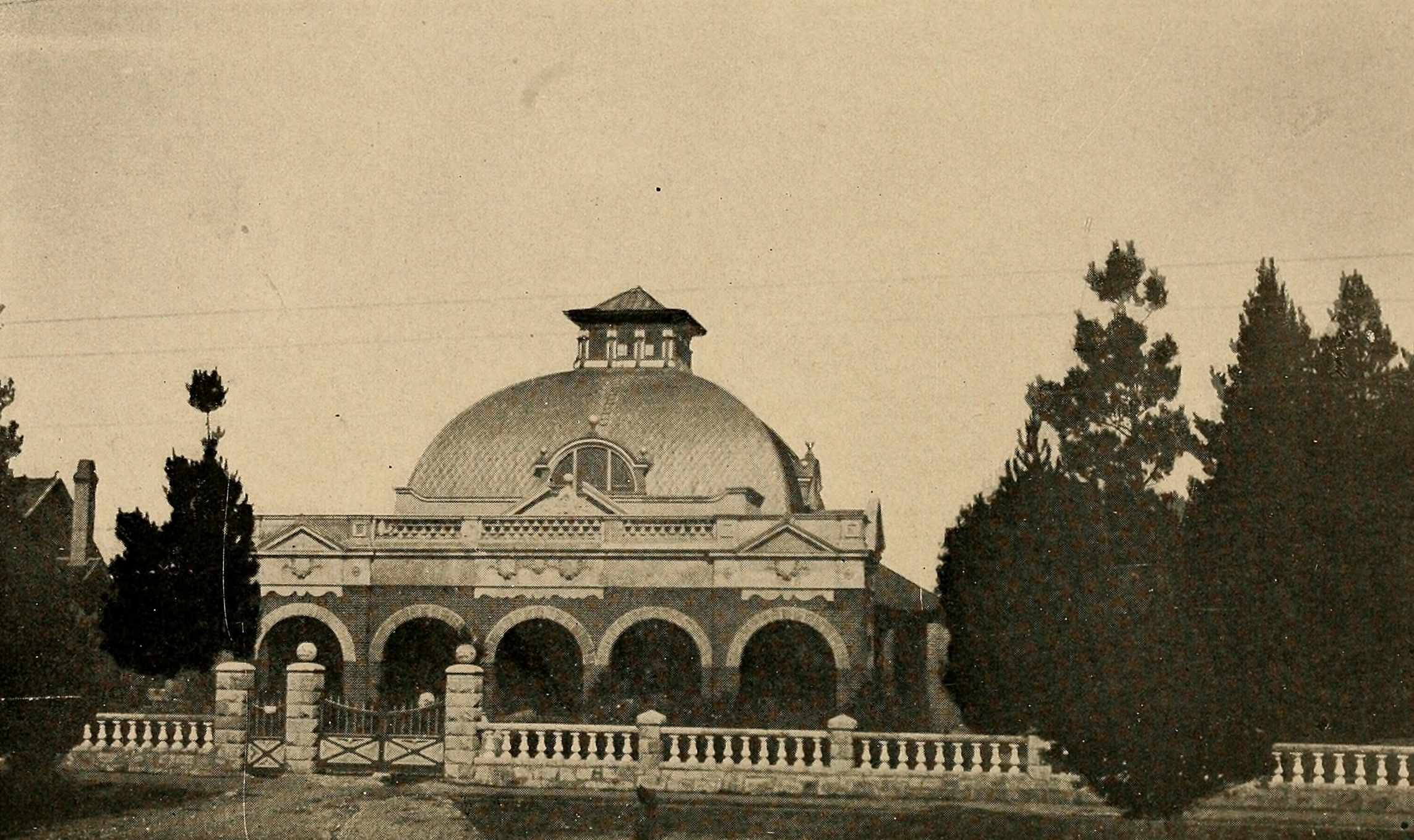
Another view of the casino, 1907

One of the most imposing buildings of the hotel is the casino building. "Casino" in this usage means meeting hall or pavilion, and it was never officially used for gambling. The casino building is an ornate late Victorian Italianate wedding-cake structure which serves as the grand ballroom of the current establishment. It was shipped from Chicago in the early 1900s and assembled by 1903.

The casino was the venue of the first performance of Dame Nellie Melba's famously-long farewell tour in 1928. Dame Clara Butt also performed in the venue. The last performance in the room was a small production of The Mikado in 1969.

The casino is the main guest entry to the hotel complex with lounge and function space, pre-function to Wintergarden and linked to the Passage Bar.

== Guest rooms ==
There are three main guest wings in the hotel: Belgravia, Hargravia and Delmonte.

The Belgravia wing was initially the former Belgravia Hotel. After being destroyed by fire, construction started on the new Belgravia wing in 1922 and completed in 1936.

The Hargravia wing is named after "Hargraves House", initially on the site of the hotel. Hargraves House was built by William Hargraves, son of Edward Hargraves, the alleged discoverer of gold in Australia.

There are three suites in the hotel: the Majestic Room, the Grand Majestic Suite and the Valley Suite.

== Famous guests ==
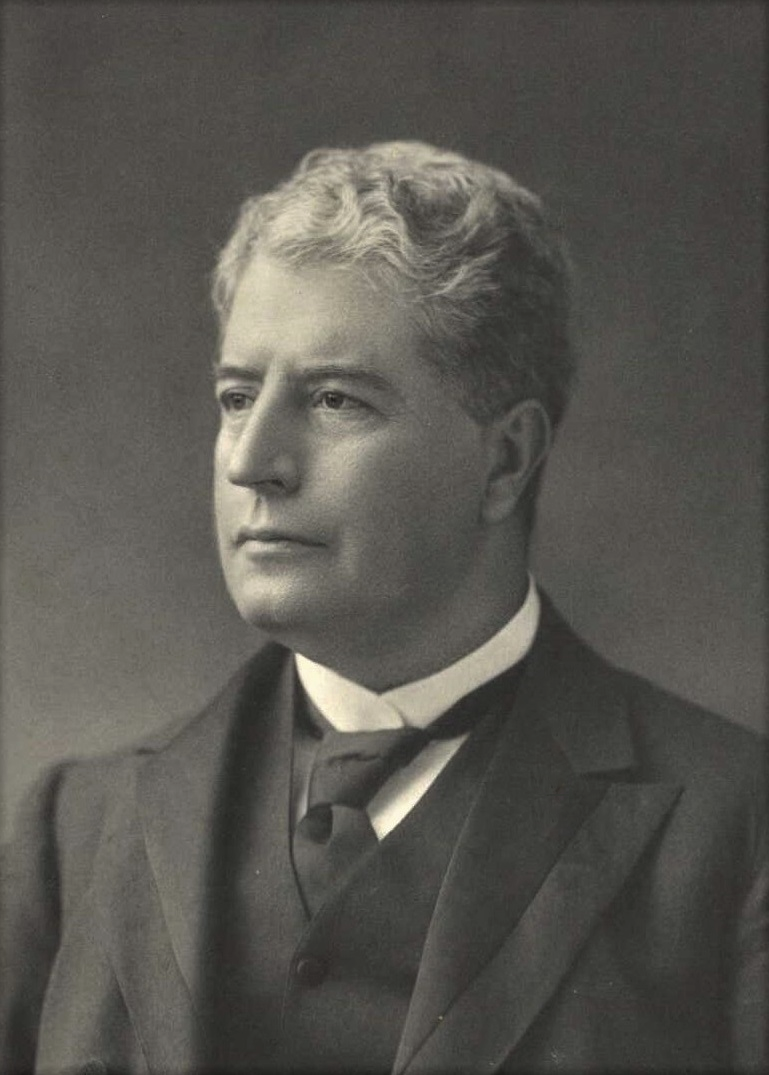
Edmund Barton

As well as Dame Nellie Melba and Dame Clara Butt, other famous guests of the hotel have included: munitions heiress Bertha Krupp, who donated a Bechstein grand piano to the hotel; Sir Arthur Conan Doyle, author of Sherlock Holmes, for whom the Blue Mountains were the inspiration for The Lost World; and more recently, Russell Crowe who was asked to remove his baseball cap while dining in the Great Dining Hall in 1994.

Boxer Tommy Burns set up a training camp at the Hydro Majestic ahead of his world title fight against Jack Johnson in Sydney in 1908, running for miles on mountain tracks in preparation.

Australia's first Prime Minister, Sir Edmund Barton died of a heart attack at the hotel while holidaying there in 1920.
