= Zanny Begg =

Australian artist and filmmaker

Zanny Begg (born 1972) is an Australian artist-filmmaker. Begg works between documentary and fiction using experimental forms of storytelling to explore hidden and/or contested histories. Begg is a participatory and collaborative artist who has exhibited in multiple exhibitions around the world including the Istanbul Biennale (2010); Taipei Biennial (2008), Sharjah Biennale (2011); and The National New Australian Art (2017). Her work consistently returns to themes of gender, spatial justice and resistance.

== Biography ==
Begg was born in Melbourne, Australia. She has a PhD in art theory and has lectured in socially engaged art practices at University of New South Wales and University of Sydney.

== Major works ==
The Beehive, winner of the inaugural ACMI and Artbank film commission, explores the 1975 disappearance of Juanita Nielsen, presumed murdered for her opposition to development in Victoria Street, Kings Cross. More than twelve women play Juanita Nielsen, each bringing their own experiences of gentrification to the role. The Beehive was partially filmed in Juanita Nielsen's old house, 202 Victoria Street. It combines fictional sequences with documentary footage including an interview with Nielsen's lover at the time of her disappearance, David Farrell. This work premiered at ACMI in 2018 and was part of the 2019 Sydney Festival.

The City of Ladies (co-directed with Elise McLeod) was filmed in Paris in 2016 and premiered at the Museum of Contemporary Art, Sydney (2017). This work loosely references Christine de Pizan's book of the same name, written in Paris in 1402, which is considered one of the earliest feminist texts. The City of Ladies is driven by an algorithm with over 300,000 possible story combinations each exploring different aspects of feminism. The film includes interviews with Silvia Federici and Hélène Cixous and features a track by Mere Women.

Stories of Kannagi (2019) was created in collaboration with Jiva Parthipan, a cultural officer with STARTTS, reimagining the 2000-year-old story of the goddess of justice, Kannagi. Kannagi is the central character of the Tamil epic Silapathikaram who burns down the kingdom when her husband is wrongly accused of a crime and executed by the King. The film includes interviews with three Sri Lankan Tamil writers based in Australia, Niromi de Soyza, Shankari Chandaran and Srisha Sritharan and won the established artist residency for the 66th Blake Prize for Religious Art.

Other works include How to Blow Up a Bubble that Won’t Burst (2015), the story of Italian architect Dante Bini’s time in Sydney in the 1970s and 1001 Nights in Fairfield which was made with Iraqi refugees in Western Sydney and screened at the Melbourne International Film Festival in 2016.

Three of Begg's film works, The Beehive, The City of Ladies and Stories of Kannagi, will tour Australia in 2021–2022 in a touring exhibition organised by Museum and Galleries NSW and UNSW Galleries called These Stories will be Different.

== Awards ==
In 2016 she won the Incinerator Art Award, Art for Social Change for her film 1001 Nights in Fairfield. In 2018 she was the winner of the inaugural ACMI and Artbank film commission for her film The Beehive. In 2021 she was the winner of the 66th Blake Prize Established Artist Residency for Stories of Kannagi.
