= Juanita Nielsen =

Australian environmental activist who disappeared in 1975

- Juanita Nielsen in the early 1970s
- Born: Juanita Joan Smith; 22 April 1937; New Lambton, New South Wales, Australia
- Disappeared: 4 July 1975 (aged 38); Kings Cross, Sydney, New South Wales, Australia
- Occupations: Newspaper publisher; conservation activist; heiress; saleswoman; model
- Family: Mark Foy (great-grandfather)

Juanita Joan Nielsen (née Smith; 22 April 1937 – disappeared 4 July 1975) was an Australian newspaper publisher, urban conservationist, and heiress. She disappeared after attending a meeting at the Carousel nightclub (also called Les Girls) in Kings Cross in Sydney on 4 July 1975. Her body has never been found.

Nielsen opposed urban development on Victoria Street, Kings Cross, Sydney, initiated by property developer Frank Theeman. She also opposed his development of the nearby suburb of Woolloomooloo. It is generally believed that she was killed because of her conservationism, and there have been strong suspicions of involvement of organised crime and corrupt police.

In the early 1980s, two men associated with Kings Cross crime boss Abe Saffron were jailed for conspiracy to kidnap Nielsen based on incidents leading up to her disappearance. A coronial inquest in November 1983 determined that Nielsen had been killed but did not identify how she died or who killed her. In 1994, a Federal parliamentary committee raised concerns about the case, particularly the fact that the National Crime Authority was using Saffron's deputy and manager of the Carousel Club, James McCartney Anderson, as a protected informer, even though he was a suspect in the disappearance and other criminal activity.

The unsolved mystery has continued to be a concern for the Australian community and has inspired several films.

== Early life and education ==
Nielsen was born Juanita Joan Smith in New Lambton, New South Wales, to Neil Donovan Smith and Vilma Grace Smith (née Meares) (1905–1978). Her parents separated soon after her birth and she was raised by her maternal grandmother at Killara, Sydney. Her father, Neil, was an English-born heir to the Mark Foy's retail fortune via his parents, John Joseph Smith (1862–1921), who was chairman and managing director of Mark Foy's Ltd, and his wife, Kathleen Sophie Foy (1870–1919). Kathleen was a sister of the founder Mark Foy and Francis Foy.

Nielsen was educated at various schools including Ravenswood School for Girls, Gordon.

== Early career and marriage ==
Prior to her publishing career Juanita worked at Mark Foy's as a glove model from 1953 until she travelled overseas in 1959. In 1962, she married a Danish merchant seaman Jorgen Fritz Nielsen in Kobe, Japan, but the marriage ended in divorce in 1967.

Nielsen returned to Sydney in 1965 after living abroad and ran a fashion boutique at Mark Foy's for about five years.

== Publishing career ==
In the early 1970s, Nielsen's father bought her a home at 202 Victoria Street, in the Sydney locality of Kings Cross, and a local newspaper called NOW.

She published NOW fortnightly from her home with the assistance of her business partner, David Farrell. Nielsen modelled fashions and hairstyles for the newspaper.

== Victoria Street development ==
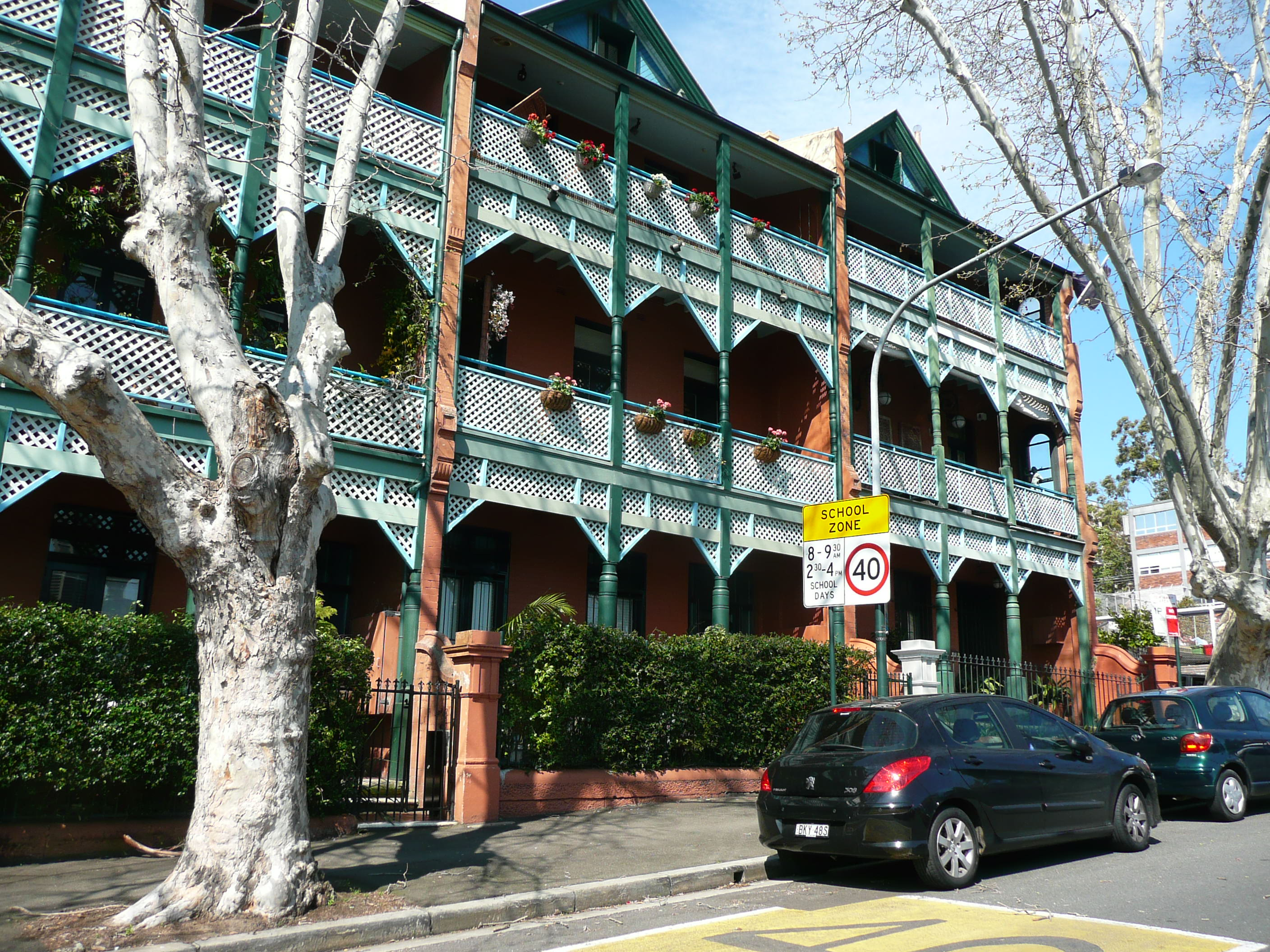
Terraced homes in Victoria Street (2010)

Frank William Theeman (born Franz Wilhelm Thiemann, 1913-1989), an Austrian Australian developer, formed property development firm "Victoria Point Pty Ltd" and planned to redevelop the heritage precinct of Victoria Street, Kings Cross. Three 45-storey apartment buildings and a 15-storey office block were planned, therefore necessitating the demolition of all existing buildings. The Kings Cross community campaigned against the development, and successfully lobbied the Builders Labourers' Federation (BLF) to impose a green ban on the site in 1972. Supported by the BLF, the residents of Victoria Street refused to leave their houses. Nielsen used her newspaper to publicise the issue. As a member of the Victoria Street Ratepayers Association, Nielsen also lodged an objection to the development proposal with the local council. BLF leader and prominent Communist Party figure Jack Mundey described Nielsen as an "upper class" person who was initially disapproving of unionism, communism, and squatting, but became more sympathetic.

In July 1973, Kings Cross resident Arthur King was kidnapped by two unidentified men, who put him in the boot of their car. King was driven to a motel outside the city and held for three days before being released near the Venus Room in Kings Cross. King quit as the head of the residents' action group and immediately moved out of the area. Distrustful of police because of recent harassment, he did not tell the truth about his disappearance until 1977. There is evidence that Kings Cross nightclub manager James McCartney "Jim" Anderson was involved with the kidnapping.

Other residents on Victoria Street were regularly harassed by men employed by Theeman as he attempted to have them evicted from their houses. The men were led by Fred Krahe, a former detective sergeant with the New South Wales Police. Krahe was reputed to be involved in organised crime and he was suspected of murdering prostitute Shirley Brifman after she had accused him of corruption.

Kings Cross residents would move into each other's houses so that no house was left unattended. In 1973, when merchant seaman, jazz musician, and Communist activist Jack Radnald Fowler, commonly known as "Mick", returned from a period working at sea, he found his rented house boarded up. Repossessing his home, Fowler fought and, in 1976, lost a court battle to stay there. The strain of the struggle reputedly led to his early death, aged 51, in August 1979. Meanwhile residents who had squatted in the houses were evicted by police on 3 January 1974.

In 1974, Nielsen stepped up her opposition to the development in her newspaper. The BLF's green ban was broken in late 1974 when the federal leadership of the BLF, bribed by developers, dismissed the leaders of the New South Wales branch. However, the green ban was continued by the Federated Engine Drivers and Firemen's Association. In addition, Nielsen convinced the Water Board Union to impose their own green ban. In February 1975, Theeman met with Nielsen and tried unsuccessfully to change her mind about the development. By June 1975, interest charges on money borrowed by Theeman's company were accruing at a rate of $16,800 a week.

The first stage of the Victoria Street development was completed in 1978. The next stage of the development saw the construction of Kings Cross railway station, Sydney, which opened in 1979.

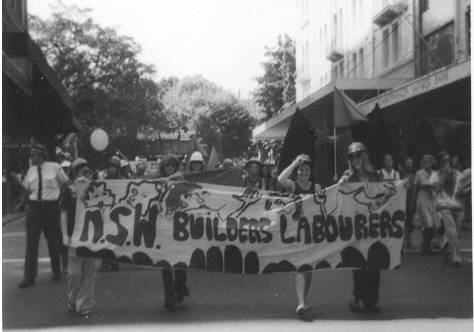
The Builders Labourers Federation marching on International Women's Day in Sydney, 1975.

== Development in Woolloomooloo ==
In 1975, the NSW and Federal governments reached an agreement with Theeman for the development of the nearby dockland suburb of Woolloomooloo.

Nielsen was a member of the Woolloomooloo Residents Action Group, which began receiving death threats at this time.

== The Carousel Club ==
The Carousel Club in Kings Cross (a transvestite revue called "Les Girls" at other times) was one of a number of bars and nightclubs controlled by Abe Saffron, who was a major figure in Sydney organised crime. The club was managed by Jim Anderson, who, as a later investigation revealed, owed $260,000 (about $1.6 million in 2011 money) to Theeman. According to Saffron's son Alan, Saffron lent large sums of money to several prominent Sydney businessmen including Theeman.

The Carousel had had no dealings with Nielsen previously, but on 13 June 1975 Anderson had initiated contact by sending Nielsen an invitation to attend a press night at the club. She would not normally have been invited because her newspaper, NOW, did not give free publicity to commercial ventures. Nielsen did not attend the event, and Anderson was reported to have been furious. On 29 June, the Carousel's PR manager Lloyd Marshall invited Nielsen to a meeting at the Camperdown Travelodge, supposedly to discuss advertising related to landscaping, but her business partner David Farrell later recounted that Nielsen became suspicious and refused to attend.

On 30 June, Edward Frederick "Eddie" Trigg and Shayne Martin-Simmonds, both employees at The Carousel, went to Nielsen's house ostensibly to discuss advertising in NOW. It was later revealed that they intended to seize Nielsen when she opened the door, but their plan was foiled when Farrell answered the door instead. The two men played out their cover story, but Nielsen stayed listening in an adjoining room and after they left complimented Farrell on his handling of the query, teasing him by saying she might send him out on the road to sell advertising in NOW. According to Farrell, Nielsen was by then seriously concerned that her activism was putting her in danger. She mentioned her fears to Farrell about two weeks before her disappearance and she arranged to keep him regularly informed of her whereabouts.

On Thursday, 3 July, at 5:30pm, Trigg rang Nielsen to make an appointment to discuss the club advertising in NOW. They agreed to meet the next day at about 10:15am at the club.

== Disappearance ==
On Friday, 4 July 1975, Nielsen went to the Carousel Club for the meeting with Eddie Trigg about advertising that had been arranged the previous night. At 10:30am, she telephoned David Farrell to tell him that she was running late for the meeting. On Saturday, 5 July, not having heard from her since, Farrell reported Nielsen to police as a missing person.

When Trigg was questioned by police he confirmed the meeting and produced a receipt Nielsen had given him for an advance payment on the advertising. He said she had left for a lunch appointment. In original statements given to police, Trigg and the club's receptionist Loretta Crawford said that Nielsen left the club alone after the meeting, but in 1976 Crawford changed her story to say that Nielsen and Trigg had left together. A local real estate agent told police that he saw Nielsen getting into a yellow car outside the club; he said there were two men in the car.

Nielsen's handbag and other personal effects were discovered on Monday, 7 July, abandoned on a freeway near Penrith in Sydney's west. On Tuesday, 8 July, the police released the news of the disappearance to the media.

== Trials for attempted kidnapping ==
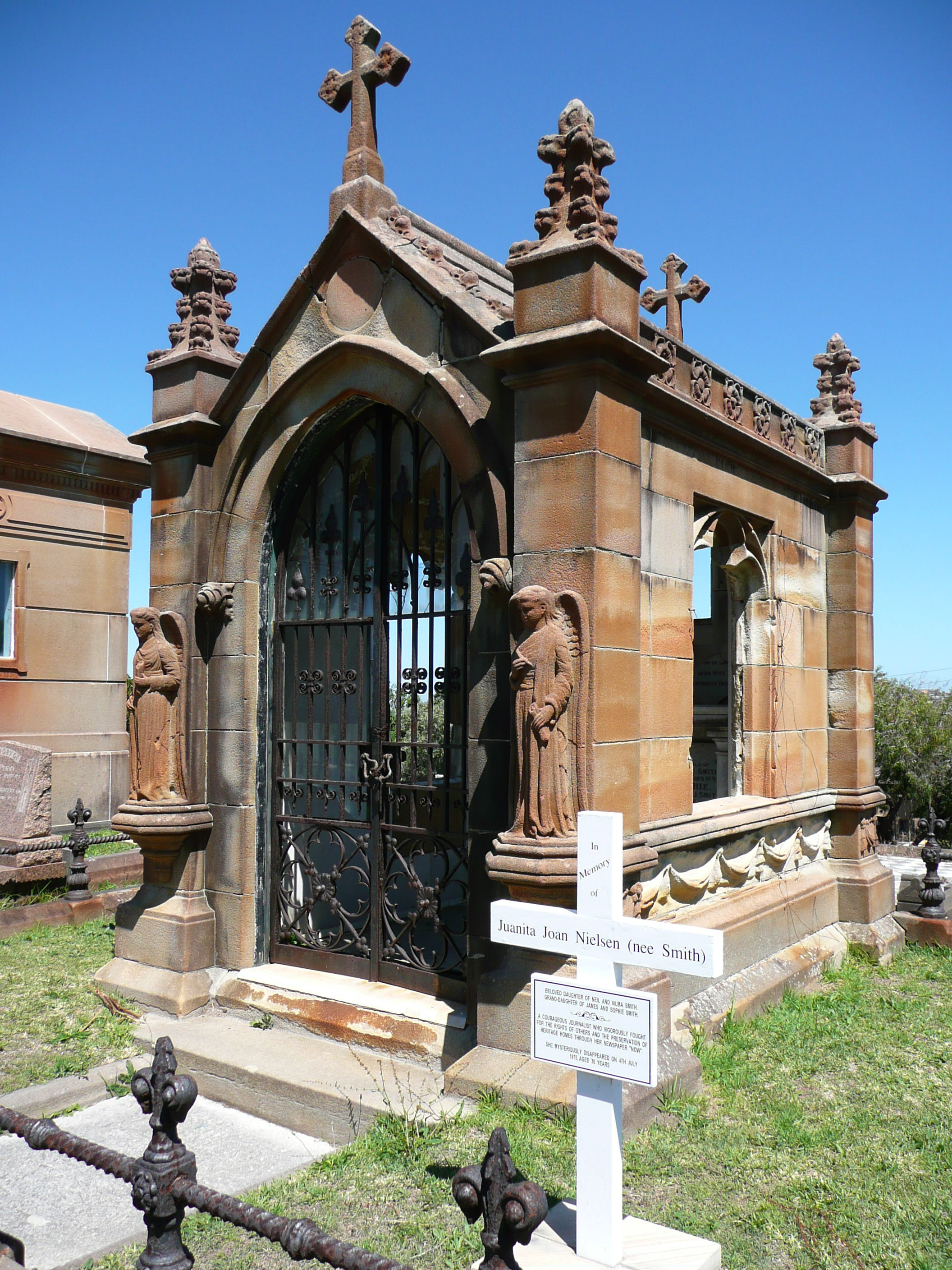
Juanita Nielsen memorial, South Head Cemetery, Vaucluse. The white cross commemorates Juanita Nielsen, while the stone monument behind it commemorates her family.

In late 1977, Eddie Trigg, Shayne Martin-Simmonds, and Lloyd Marshall, all one-time employees of the Carousel Club, were charged with conspiring to kidnap Nielsen over the incidents prior to her disappearance. When interviewed by police on 6 November 1977, Martin-Simmonds confirmed that the advertising story was a ruse and that their actual intention was to kidnap Nielsen if she was alone and take her to see "people who wanted to talk to her". He said that he and Trigg intended to:

"... Just grab her arms and stop her calling out, no real rough stuff, no gangster stuff. We thought that just two guys telling her to come would be enough to make her think if she didn't come she might get hurt ... we talked about when she came into the room, one of us would be standing there and the other one would come up behind her and just quietly grab her by the arms and maybe put a hand over her mouth or a pillowslip over the head."

Martin-Simmonds told police he didn't know the identity of the people who wanted to talk to Nielsen.

A trial commenced in 1980. The judge ordered the jury to acquit Marshall as there was no evidence linking him to the plan to use force against Nielsen. The jury was unable to reach a verdict on Trigg and Martin-Simmonds, and a retrial was ordered. In 1981, Martin-Simmonds was retried, convicted, and sentenced to two years jail. The judge questioned him about the identity of the people who had hired him for the kidnapping, but he provided no information.

Meanwhile Trigg had fled to the US on a fake passport and was arrested in San Francisco in 1982. He told police: "They’re making all this noise over a woman who was nothing but an out-and-out communist. No loss to society at all". Extradited back to Australia, he pleaded guilty and in 1983 was imprisoned for three years.

== Coronial inquest ==
A coronial inquest with a jury was held in 1983. It was the longest in NSW history, running for 13 weeks and hearing from 69 witnesses. Theeman denied that Nielsen was a threat to his development plans. Saffron said that he had heard of the disappearance in the newspapers and hadn't enquired further.

The inquest heard that Anderson had numerous personal and business links with the Theeman family. Anderson agreed he was an obvious suspect, but denied any involvement, directly or indirectly. The counsel assisting the inquest described him as a "stranger to the truth". Anderson blamed former detective Fred Krahe for Nielsen's death, but by this time Krahe was dead.

Counsel for the Nielsen estate said that Trigg and Martin-Simmonds had to be involved in the disappearance, arguing that having two groups plotting against Nielsen at the same time would be a "very, very, unbelievable coincidence".

Neither the coroner nor any counsel appearing at the inquest argued that there was enough evidence to make a case against any known person. The jury determined that Nielsen had died "on or shortly after 4 July 1975", although there was not enough evidence to show how she died or who killed her. The jury found there was "evidence to show that the police inquiries were inhibited by an atmosphere of corruption, real or imagined, that existed at the time".

== Federal parliamentary committee ==
In 1994 the Commonwealth Parliamentary Joint Committee on the National Crime Authority criticised police failings and linked the Nielsen disappearance to property developers and the King Cross criminal underworld.

The committee questioned the National Crime Authority's use of Jim Anderson as a protected informer as he was a suspect in the disappearance and other criminal activity.

== Subsequent news reports ==
Subsequently, Marilyn King, the former girlfriend of Edward Trigg, told a journalist that Trigg had returned home on 4 July 1975 with blood on his clothes. A piece of paper in his pocket, supposedly a receipt signed by Nielsen for advertising money paid by Trigg, also had blood on it. King said that Trigg threw out the shirt and the portion of the paper with blood on it. King never gave testimony to the police or the coronial inquiry.

In 2000, Loretta Crawford, receptionist at the Carousel Club, added to her story. She said that she made a phone call to her boss, Jim Anderson, at his home in Vaucluse, told him that Nielsen had arrived at the club and that he was "quite pleased" by the news. She was adamant that Anderson was in Vaucluse—not in Surfers Paradise, Queensland, as he always said.

In 2004 ABC-TV's The 7:30 Report broadcast a new interview with Crawford in which she claimed her previous testimony regarding Nielsen was false and had been concocted to protect Jim Anderson, but that his recent death meant she was now free to reveal the truth. Crawford's new claim was that Nielsen had indeed been killed in the basement of the club in the presence of Trigg and Martin-Simmonds, and that she had seen Nielsen's body on the floor, bearing a single small gunshot wound, and that she saw a third man, whom she did not name, standing over Nielsen's body, holding a pistol.

The obvious motive for Nielsen's murder was her opposition to the development of Victoria Street and Woollomoloo. However, there have also been claims that she was working on an exposé about vice, corruption and illegal gambling in Kings Cross. Her then boyfriend John Glebe gave evidence that Nielsen had told him about receiving telephone threats and he also testified that she carried cassette tapes in her handbag. According to Glebe, Nielsen had told him that the tapes could "blow the top off" an issue she was working on. An article in The Bulletin in 2005 ran claims by journalist Barry Ward that Nielsen had been given dossiers on "prominent Sydney identities" by private detective Allan Honeysett, and speculated that these documents would reputedly have exposed the principals involved in Sydney's illegal gaming industry.

Trigg died alone in a room he rented at the Abbotts Hotel in Sydney's inner suburb of Waterloo on 25 February 2013. The Australian newspaper reported that, prior to his death, Trigg had written an account of his involvement in the case, which "named names" of those involved and revealed the resting place of Nielsen's remains. NSW police spokesperson confirmed that police had searched Trigg's residence after his death, but they refused to comment on the outcome. The report also said that the account was to be published after his death to provide an inheritance for his descendants.

== Reward ==
In 2021, the reward for information about the disappearance of Juanita Nielsen was doubled to $1 million. Her family and the police expressed hope that they might be able to find Nielsen's remains.

== In Australian culture ==
Nielsen's disappearance was fictionalised in Donald Crombie's The Killing of Angel Street in 1981. Crombie said making the film was fraught with tension:

We researched it pretty thoroughly and we got fairly close to the beast, I think. We were peculiarly warned off by none other a person than John Dowd, who's a judge now, I believe. He rang Tony Buckley and said that this film was a bit close to the bone and - talking about me - he said, "He's got young children and he should be thinking a bit about what he's doing." It didn't put us off, but you did look under the car for about two days afterwards because you thought, hang on a minute, what's all this about... And the nexus between government and big business and crime. They're very comfortable together.

The release of The Killing of Angel Street was swiftly followed by another movie, Phillip Noyce's Heatwave, in 1982. An artistic documentary, Zanny Begg's The Beehive, came out in 2018.

The City of Sydney Council opened the Juanita Nielsen Community Centre in Woolloomooloo in 1983.

In 2016, Urthboy released the song "Hey Juanita" about Nielsen's life on his studio album The Past Beats Inside Me Like a Second Heartbeat.

== See also ==
- Hilda Murrell
- Karen Silkwood
- Sallie-Anne Huckstepp
- Shirley Brifman
- Shirley Finn
- List of people who disappeared
