= James McCartney Anderson =

James McCartney Anderson (1930–2003) was an organised crime figure based in Kings Cross in Sydney, Australia. He was the deputy to crime boss Abe Saffron and was instrumental in putting him in jail on tax charges. He also acted as a police informant.

Anderson was the manager of the Carousel Club where environmental campaigner Juanita Nielsen disappeared. He denied any involvement.

== Early life ==
Anderson was born in Glasgow in a working-class family. Anderson had a variety of jobs before coming to Australia in the late 1950s as the manager of a Maori show band called the Hi Fives. At that time he met Abe Saffron.

== Career ==
Anderson became associated with Saffron in the late 1960s. During the 1970s he managed bars, nightclubs, and strip clubs, including Les Girls, the Carousel and the Venus Room. When asked if the women renting apartments above the Venus Room were engaging in prostitution, he replied: "I don't think they were playing Scrabble."

In 1970, in the Venus Room in Kings Cross, Anderson shot dead underworld figure, Donny Smith. He claimed it was self–defence and the case against him was dropped.

In 1975, environmental campaigner, Juanita Nielsen, disappeared at Anderson's Carousel Club. The coronial inquest heard that Anderson had numerous personal and business links with the Theeman family who were behind the development Nielsen was protesting against. Anderson agreed he was an obvious suspect, but denied any involvement, directly or indirectly, with the disappearance. The counsel assisting the inquest described him as a "stranger to the truth". Anderson blamed former detective Fred Krahe for Nielsen's death, but by this time Krahe was dead. Till his death, Anderson denied any involvement and said he was interstate at the time.

In the early 1980s, Anderson became an informer for the National Crime Authority and testified to Saffron's dishonest accounting practices. Saffron was sent to jail for tax fraud.

In 1994 the Commonwealth Parliamentary Joint Committee on the National Crime Authority questioned the NCA's use of Jim Anderson as a protected informer as he was a suspect in the Nielsen disappearance and other criminal activity.

== Retirement and death ==
In 1995 Anderson moved to the Blue Mountains (New South Wales) and died of cancer in 2003.
