= Victoria Street, Sydney =

Street in Sydney, Australia

Victoria Street, East Sydney New South Wales
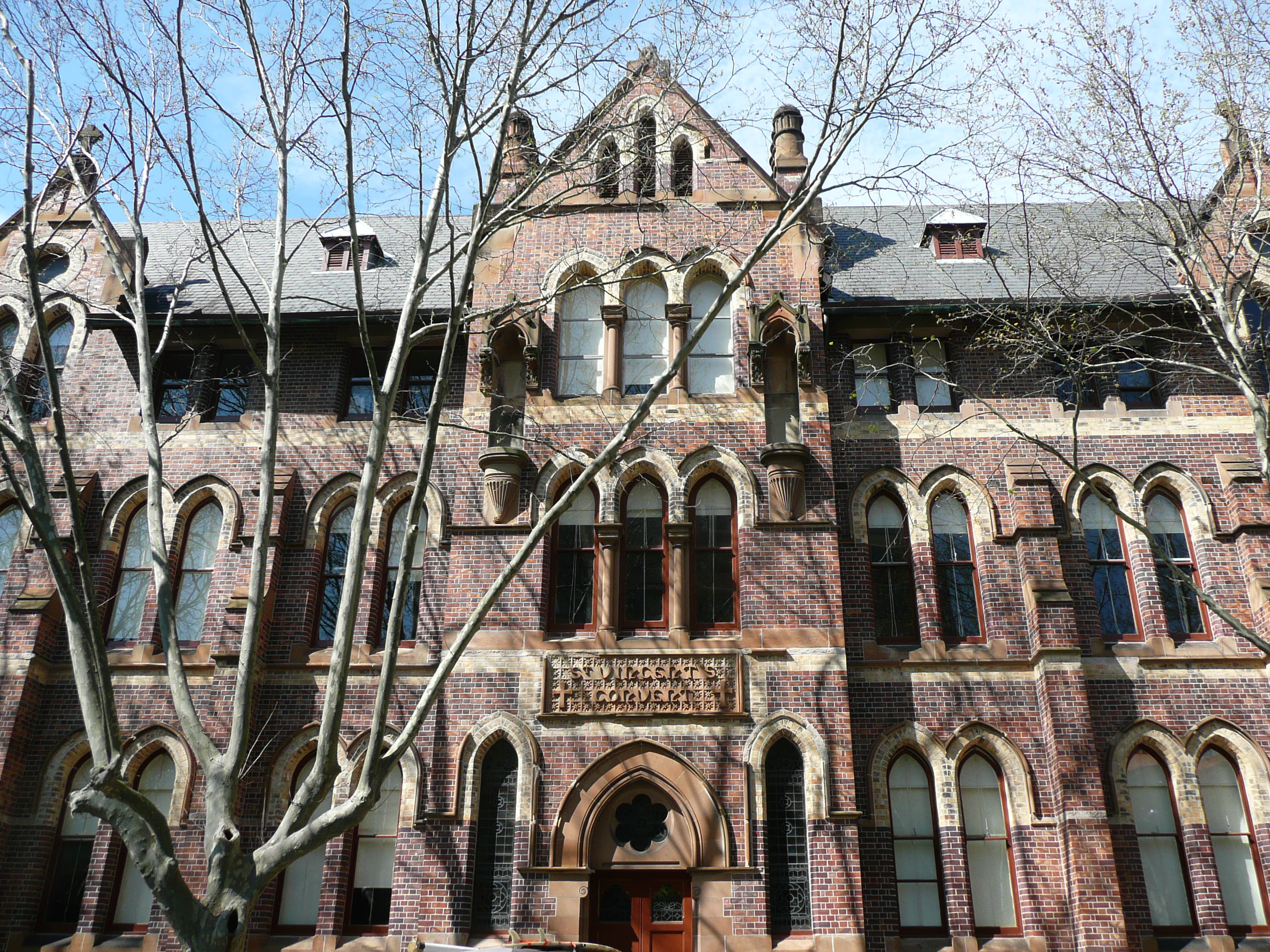
- St Vincent's College, Potts Point
- Coordinates: 33.867624°S 151.224033°E (Northern end); 33.881531°S 151.219042°E (Southern end)

General information
- Type: Street
- Length: 1.6 km (1.0 mi)

Major junctions
- Northern end: Grantham Street; Potts Point, Sydney
- Darlinghurst Road; Liverpool Street
- Southern end: Oxford Street; Darlinghurst, Sydney

Location(s)
- LGA(s): City of Sydney
- Major suburbs: Potts Point, Darlinghurst

Victoria Street is a suburban street located in the inner eastern suburbs of Sydney, in the City of Sydney local government area of New South Wales, Australia. From south to north, Victoria Street goes through the suburbs of Darlinghurst, Potts Point and the locality of Kings Cross. It is 1.6 kilometres (0.99 mi) in length. In the section in Darlinghurst, the street is one-way, from north to south only.

Redevelopment of the street during the early 1970s caused much controversy. Residents opposed the building of a forty-five storey complex and insisted that provision be made for middle and low income wage earners to remain living there. In response the NSW Builders Labourers Federation placed a green ban in 1971, bringing demolitions to a halt. To prevent work being done by non-union labour, squatters moved into disused houses after residents were forced out. In January 1974 a confrontation occurred and all residents (except one, Mick Fowler) were evicted from the street. After continued campaigning the redevelopment design was amended and while low-cost housing was lost, some protection was applied to houses on the basis of heritage values.

== Description ==
At its southern end, Victoria Street starts at Oxford Street, Darlinghurst. It goes north through the locality of Kings Cross, where it forms a large intersection with Darlinghurst Road. Further north, it continues through Potts Point to terminate at Grantham Street, above Woolloomooloo Bay. The street is a mixture of residential and commercial buildings, with a number of old, Victorian homes that have been converted to backpackers' hostels. Between Earl Street and Grantham Street, Potts Point, the some buildings on both sides of the street are listed on the local government heritage register.

== Points of interest ==
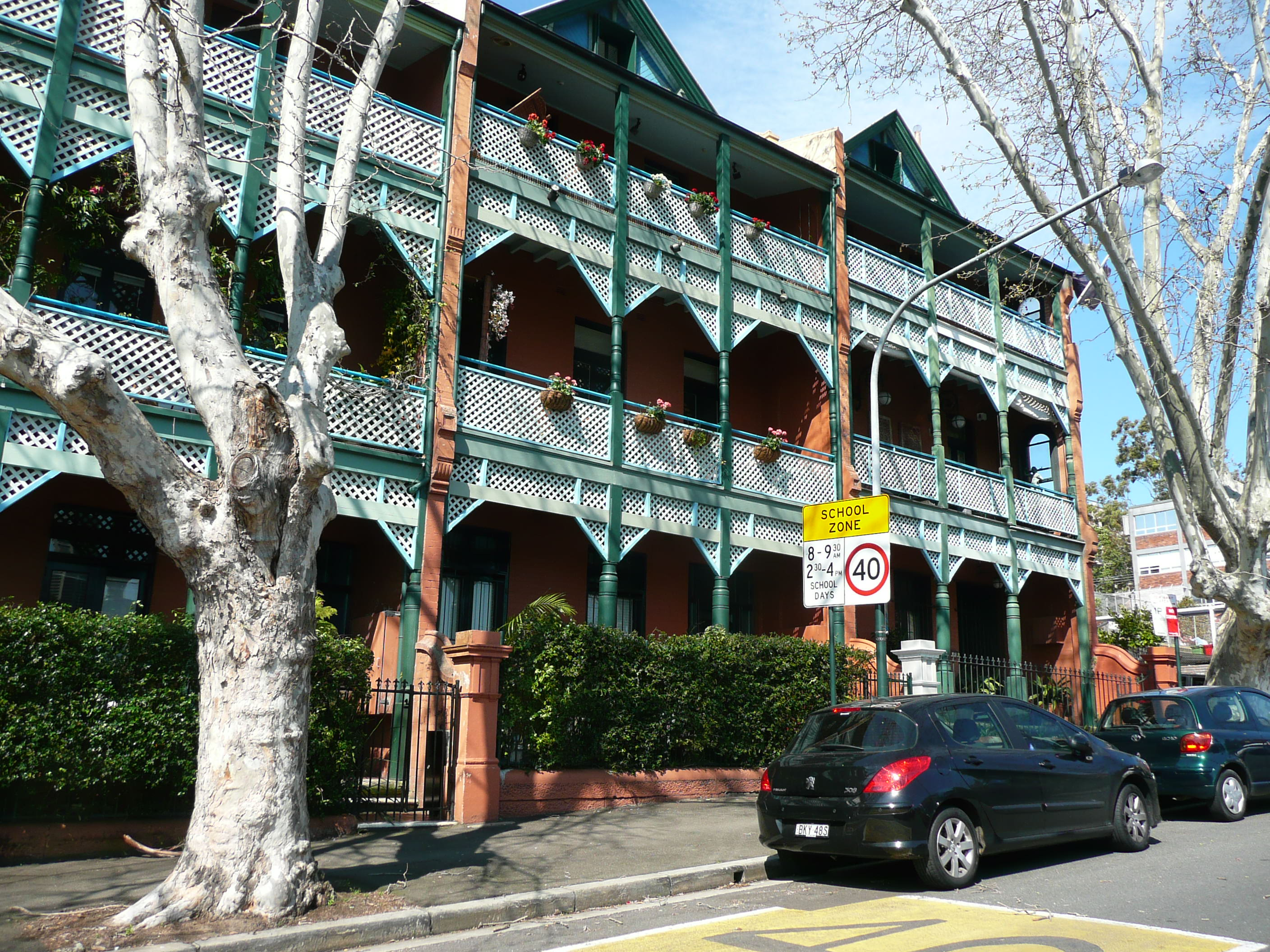
Terraced homes in Federation Filigree style

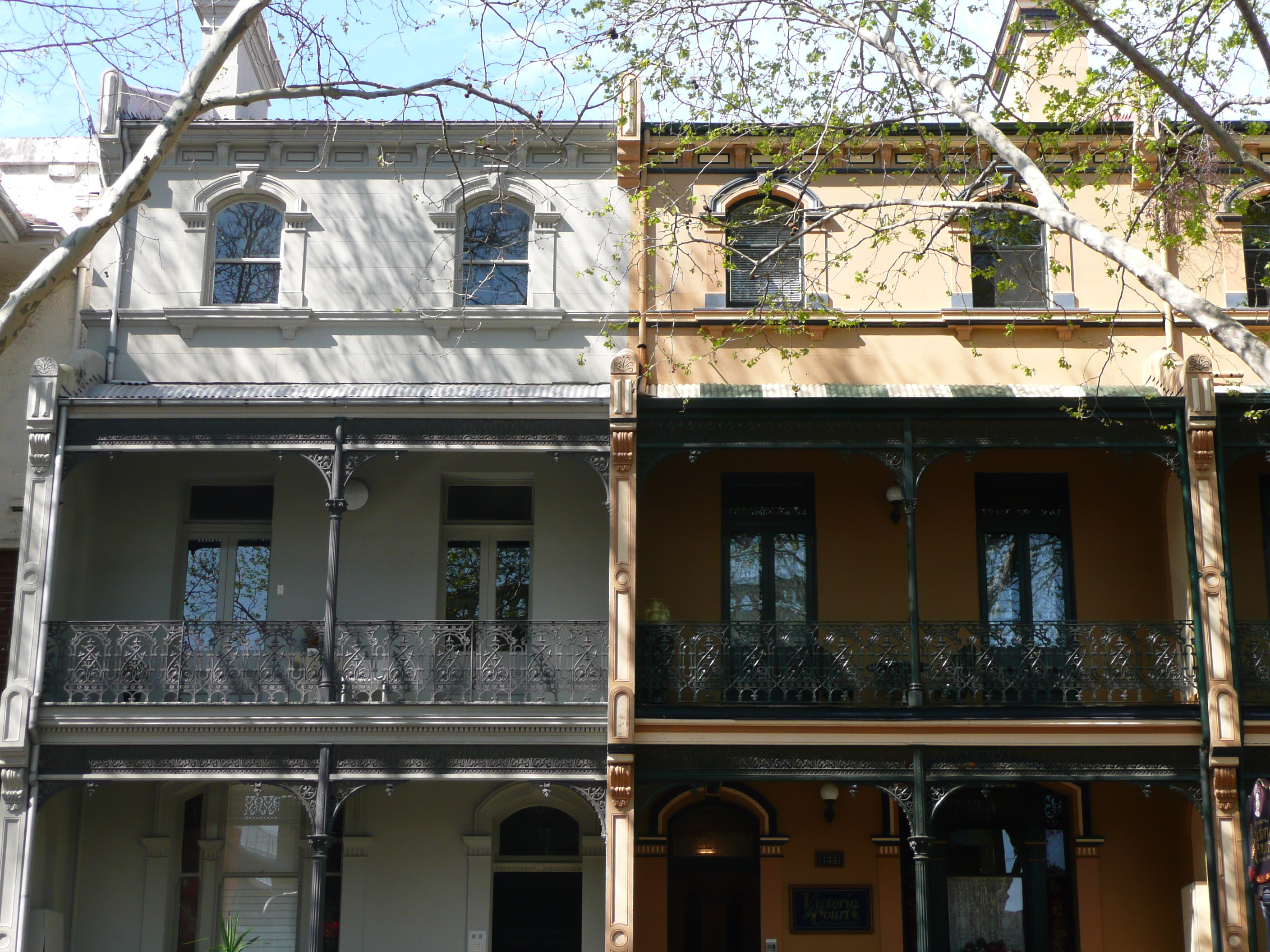
Characteristic three-storey terraced homes with wrought iron

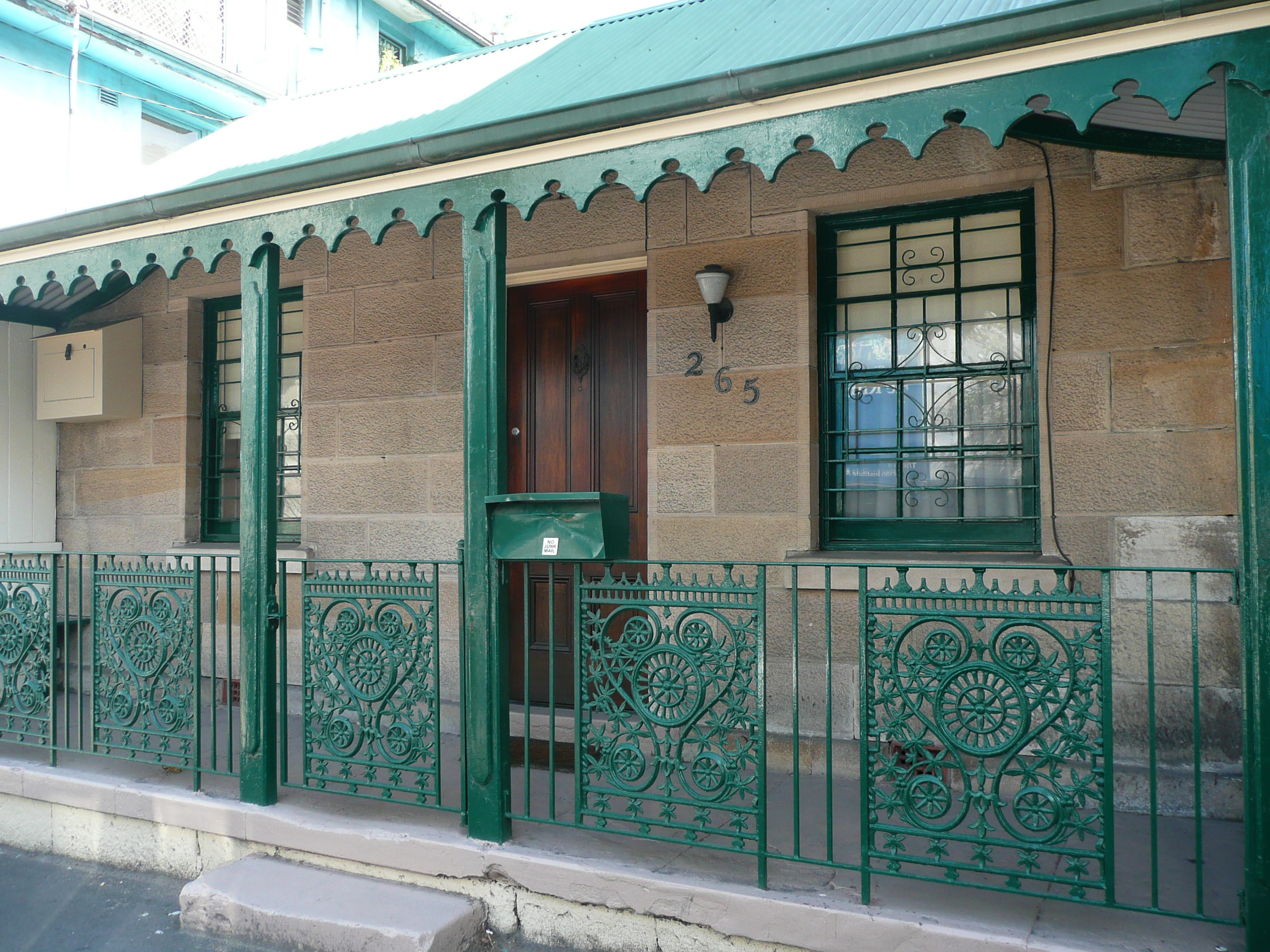
Single-storey sandstone cottage

Embarkation Park

The park is situated at the far northern end of the street and was constructed on the roof of the Australian Defence Force car-park in Cowper Wharf Roadway. It provides the locals with some breathing space, with harbour views.

Terraced Homes

Roughly opposite Embarkation Park, there is a terrace of homes designed in the Federation Filigree style, using woodwork instead of the more usual wrought iron. They are an unusual sight in Sydney, where terraced homes are almost invariably designed in Victorian styles.

Juanita Nielsen's House

Juanita Nielsen's House, located at 202 Victoria Street, Potts Point, is one of a group of three terrace houses erected in the 1850s on the site of the former Telford Lodge estate. Purchased by Juanita Nielsen in 1968, a journalist and great-granddaughter of businessman Mark Foy, Nielsen disappeared after she strongly opposed the redevelopment of the Potts Point/King Cross area and the intimidation and eviction of working-class tenants of the area and the adjoining suburb of Woolloomooloo. The house is listed on the New South Wales State Heritage Register.

St Vincent's College, Potts Point

St Vincent's College is situated on the corner of Victoria Street and Challis Avenue. It was founded in 1858 by Irish Sisters of Charity and was known as the Victoria Street Roman Catholic School. Its cluster of brick buildings makes a distinctive landmark.

Butler, McElhone and Hordern Stairs

These three sets of stairs are located on the west side of the street and provide access to the Woolloomooloo area. They are all heritage-listed.

Darlinghurst Fire Station

Situated at the intersection of Victoria Street and Darlinghurst Road, this station was designed by the Government Architect, Walter Liberty Vernon, in the Federation Free Style, utilising a familiar combination of brick and sandstone.

St John's Anglican Church, Darlinghurst

St John's Anglican Church was completed in 1858, with nave and aisles designed by J. F. Hilly. Many later additions were designed by Edmund Blacket. The church is heritage-listed. The rectory was designed by Hilly and built c. 1858, and is also heritage-listed.

Rough Edges

Immediately south of the church, this is a drop-in centre run by St John's Church and staffed by volunteers.

Green Park Hotel

This hotel was built in 1893 of red brick and was largely influenced by the Federation Queen Anne style, with some Free Classical details.

St Vincent's Hospital, Sydney

St Vincent's Hospital was founded in 1857 by the Sisters of Charity. It was originally located at the site of St Vincent's College, but was later moved to Darlinghurst. The main hospital building was designed by Wardell and Denning in the Inter-War Free Classical Style and built in 1921. It has been described as having "Therapeutic verandas integrated into free classical colonnades." The Sacred Heart Hospice, located on the opposite side of the street, was founded in 1890. The Garvan Institute of Medical Research together with the Kinghorn Cancer Centre, and the Victor Chang Cardiac Research Institute are all co-located on Victoria Street. St Vincent's Private Hospital and Clinic is located towards the street's southern terminus.

Green Park

This park is located opposite the hospital, occupying a site between Victoria Street and Darlinghurst Road.
