= Sydney Flying Squadron =

Coordinates: 33°50′42″S 151°12′54″E

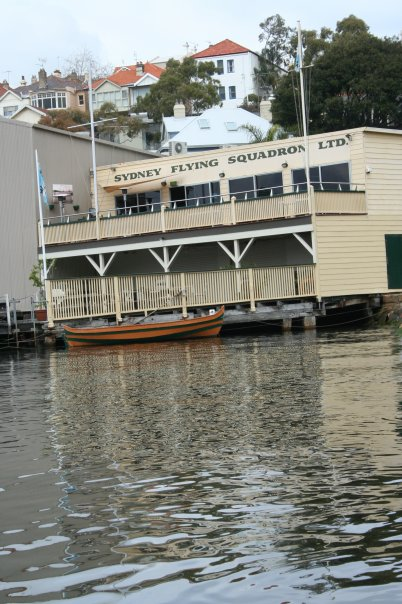
Sydney Flying Squadron

Sydney Flying Squadron Yacht club was founded in 1891 by Mark Foy on Sydney Harbour sailing skiff classes. It was founded to allow people to enjoy skiff sailing regardless of financial background. The Sydney Flying Squadron, affectionately called The Squaddy by its members and locals, is Australia's oldest open boat sailing club on the shores of Sydney Harbour.

== Location ==
Sydney Flying Squadron is located at the end of Careening Cove, Milsons Point, Sydney; the Squaddy features spectacular water views and is situated next to Milsons Park which provides a large grassy rigging area during summer months. Racing takes place from October to Easter with a break over Christmas.

== History and background ==
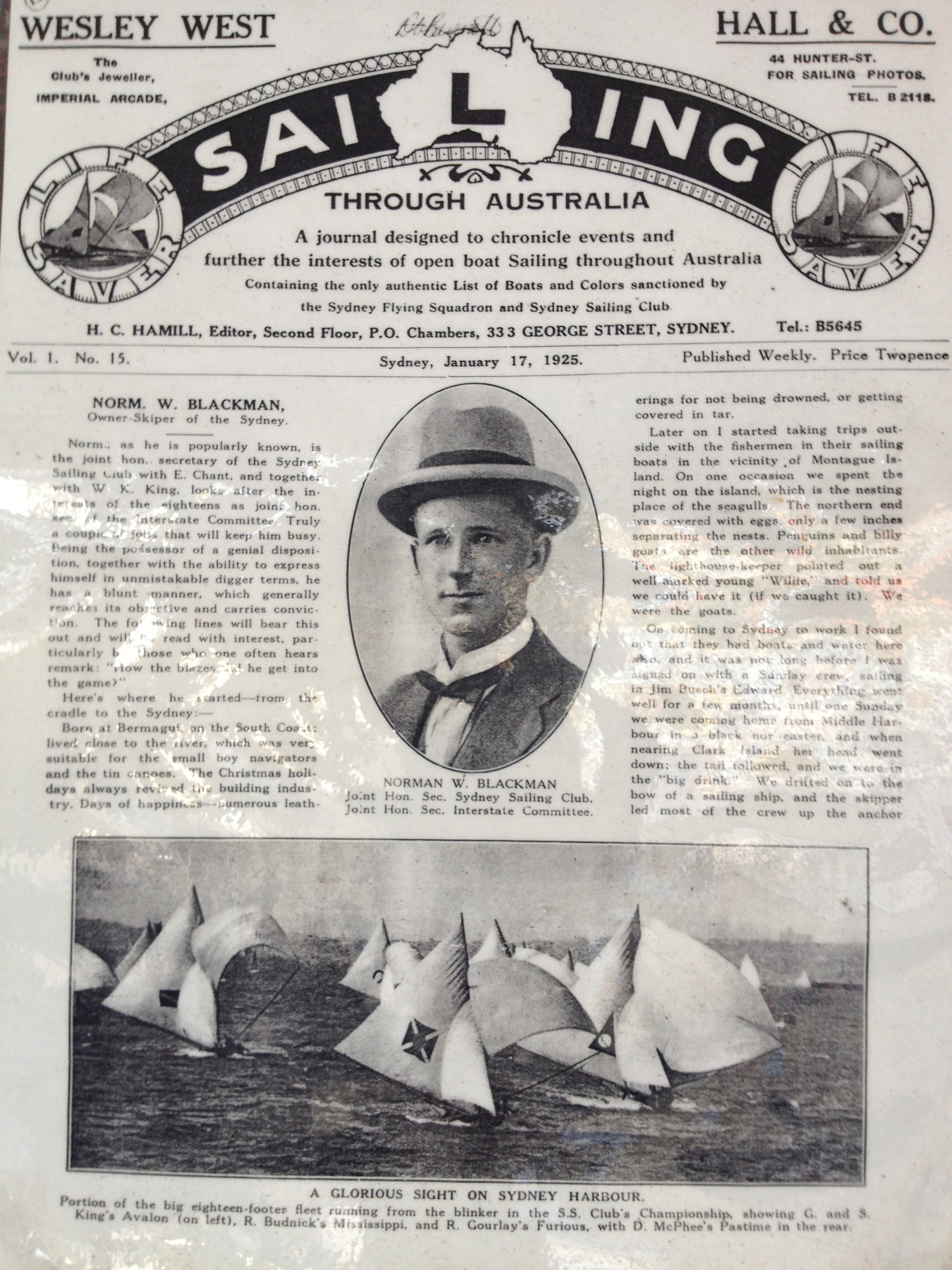
Historical mark of Sydney Squadron club

Sydney's open boat scene boomed in the mid-1890s and the Johnstone's Bay Sailing Club had become the most vibrant and progressive club on the harbour. Races were held for all open boats up to 26 feet including several of the new 18-foot type that has begun to emerge. In January 1894, Mr T. Goodall, owner of the crack Brisbane 22-footer Caneebie, was in Sydney to follow the anniversary Regatta and discussed with Billi Golding, Caneebie's builder, the possibility of an inter-colonial sailing contest between NSW and Queensland 22-footer. Golding placed the matter before the energetic Johnstone's Bay Sailing Club who immediately opened negotiations with Queensland Yacht Club, and in March sent its three best 22-footers, Latona, Portia and Irex up to Brisbane for the first inter-colonial yacht races for open boats. Honours were shared in a two race series between the local champion Bulletin, owned and skippered by James Whereat, and Sydney's Irex, owned and skippered by Nick Johnson. A re-match in Sydney was promised and set to coincide with the 1895 Anniversary Regatta.

The advent of inter-colonial open boat racing set the Sydney scene humming. Every yacht club wanted to be involved, even a recently deceased one. In the Sydney Morning Herald 12 April 1894, on page 6, a small paragraph appeared starting: “Sydney Flying Squadron Yacht Club” A meeting of sailing men was held at Rainsford's Cambridge Club Hotel last night for the purpose of re-establishing this club. Mr F.J. Donovan was voted to the chair, and called on Mr M. Foy to explain the object of the meeting. That gentleman then states his ideas on the matter, after which it was decided that the club be formed, and that it be open for boats from 18 ft to 26 ft’.

At its first meeting in August 1894, members voted to name the club, the Sydney Flying Squadron. Mark Foy was elected Commodore with Vice-Commodores, Messrs A. Roderick and Billy Golding. Club colours were to be a blue burgee with a white triangle. All boats were to carry ‘Large distinguishing colours on sails.’

This was a radical step. Sailing clubs and yacht clubs of the time restricted sails to plain colours and no insignia. There was considerable opposition from the establishment. Another radical step was to introduce a scratch start. This meant the fastest boat started off scratch, or at a particular time, and every other boat had a handicap. They started a number of minutes before the scratch boat. A boat with a 10-minute handicap started 10 minutes before the scratch boat. The intention was that all boats would finish at the same time.

In the past, all boats in a race would start simultaneously, with handicaps calculated post-race to determine the winner. This meant no one knew who had won until officials computed each boat's finish time and handicap. The introduction of the scratch start injected more excitement into the races. Boats often crossed the finish line in close proximity, much to the delight of spectators. Brightly colored insignia on the sails made it easy for viewers to distinguish between boats and track their positions during the race. Additionally, the fastest boats had the challenge of navigating through the fleet, aiming to overtake the slowest boats on the final stretch. Another aspect that added excitement was gambling. As many as 10 to 12 ferries would follow the races, with bookmakers onboard clandestinely accepting bets.

The police would regularly raid the ferries, but by the time the ferry had slowed down enough to allow the police boat to come alongside, mysteriously no money would be in site. Just a bunch of avid spectators.

== Sailing at the Squaddy ==
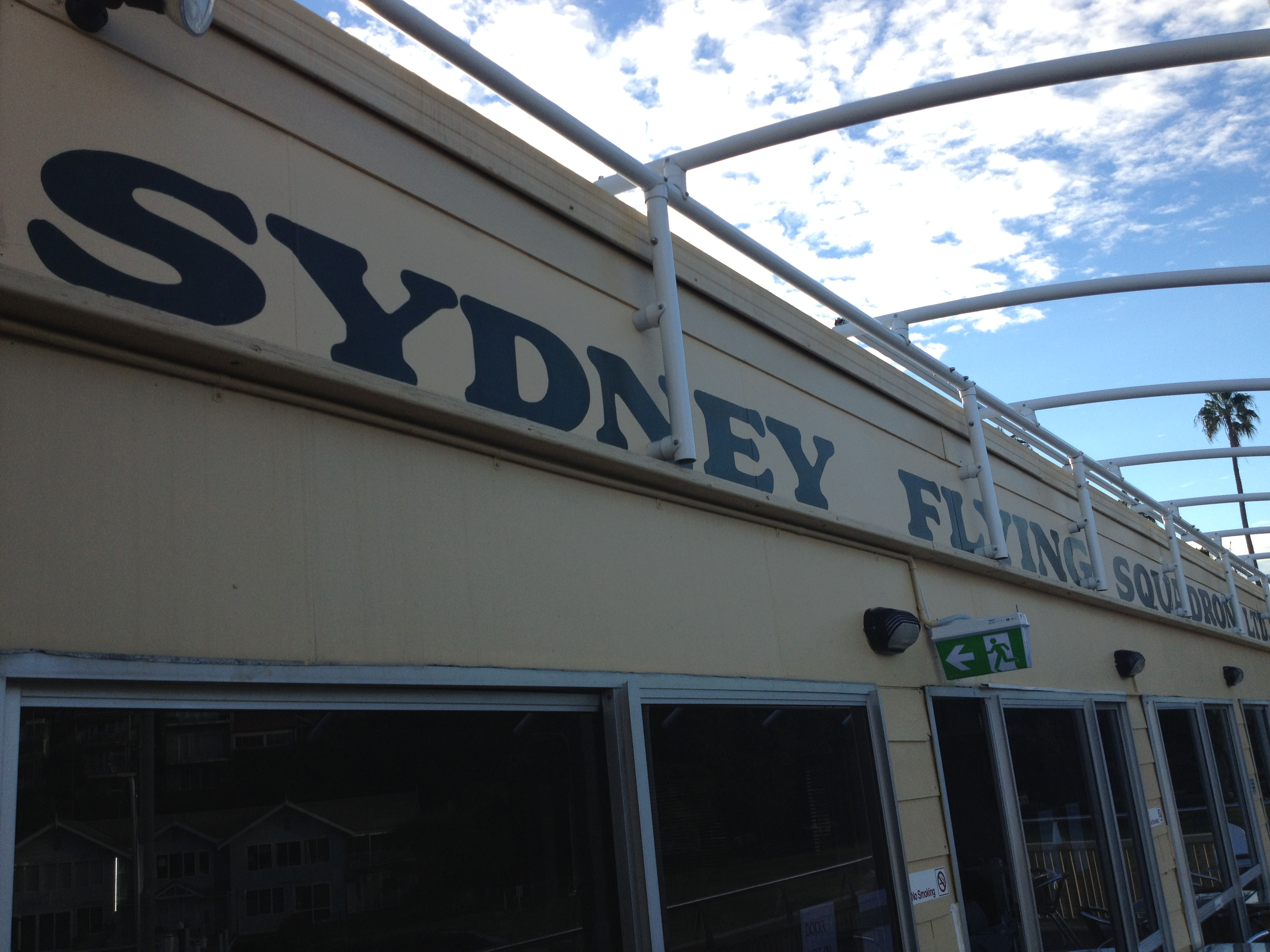
Sydney Squadron club

Sydney Flying Squadron conducts racing on Sydney Harbour for senior skiff classes on Saturdays and Sundays during the summer months, September through April. On Saturdays, the flying 18 Foot Skiff class, both Modern and Historical as well as the Flying Dutchman class race from 2:30 pm. On Sundays TBA.

18 Foot Skiffs Carrying over 1200 sq feet of sail power, the high performance 18-footer is recognised for its power.

Historical Skiffs The Historic 18 Footers are replicas of famous 18's from the period between 1900 and 1950. They are constructed and sailed by members of the Australian Historical Sailing Skiff Association (AHSSA) which was formed in 1991 by a group of ex-skiffies with the aim to preserve the history of Sydneys classic open skiffs.

Flying Dutchman Flying Dutchman are raced all around Australia and in 44 other countries. World Championships are held annually, as are Australian National and State Titles.

12 Foot Skiffs The 12 ft skiff is a development class that is sailed in NSW, QLD and New Zealand The main regattas are the State, Australian and Interdominion championships. NSW also holds interclub regattas during the season at Lane Cove, Saratoga, Abbotsford, SFS and Greenwich.

International 14's The International 14 is a high performance development skiff with two crew on trapeze supporting 50+ sq m of sail area including an asymmetric kite. I14's are sailed throughout Australia as well as worldwide in Austria, Canada, Denmark, France, Germany, Japan, New Zealand, Switzerland, the United Kingdom and the USA.

== See also ==
- Royal Sydney Yacht Squadron, neighbouring club
