= Shirley Brifman =

Australian sex worker and whistleblower (1935–1972)

- Born: Shirley Margaret Emerson; 7 December 1935; Atherton, Queensland, Australia
- Died: 4 April 1972 (aged 36); Clayfield, Queensland, Australia
- Other name: Marge Chapple
- Occupations: Prostitute, brothel madam
- Known for: Whistleblower on police corruption

Shirley Margaret Brifman (née Emerson; 7 December 1935 – 4 March 1972) was an Australian sex worker and brothel madam who was known as a whistleblower on police corruption. She died at the age of 36 in suspicious circumstances, in what was ruled a suicide.

== Early life ==
Brifman was born in Atherton, Queensland, the thirteenth child of Beatrice (née Currey) and James Emerson, a labourer. She began working as a barmaid after leaving school, and in 1957, she married Szama "Sonny" Brifman, a Polish-born hotel owner; they had four children together. Her career in prostitution had begun by at least the following year, when she was known to be working in a Brisbane brothel, under the alias "Marge Chapple".

== Brothel madam ==
Brifman moved to Sydney in 1963. She worked out of a hotel in the Kings Cross red-light district until 1968, when she began opening her own brothels. She ran establishments in Potts Point and Elizabeth Bay, and claimed to be making up to $5,000 per week. Brifman operated under police protection, but in 1971 she and her husband were arrested and charged with prostitution offences. She appeared on This Day Tonight, a national television program, to make allegations of police corruption, and over the following months was interviewed by senior officers from both the New South Wales Police and Queensland Police. She named over fifty police figures (from both states) who had been involved in prostitution, but criminal charges were brought against only one officer – detective senior sergeant Tony Murphy was charged with perjury.

== Death ==
Brifman died at a police safe house in Clayfield, Queensland in March 1972, aged 36. Her death came eighteen days before she was due to appear as chief witness in the trial of Tony Murphy; the case against him subsequently collapsed.

The police gave her cause of death as "barbiturate intoxication", and the State Coroner declined to investigate further, as police advised there were "no suspicious circumstances". Brifman's family believed she had been murdered, and her husband ensured that her body was buried rather than cremated in case an exhumation was required. Allegations of murder were raised at the Fitzgerald Inquiry in the late 1980s, but no action was taken. However, Brifman's daughter Mary Anne continued to lobby the Queensland government for a further investigation, and in January 2017 the Attorney-General, Yvette D'Ath, announced that the State Coroner would "make further inquiries" into her death and "determine whether an inquest should be held".

== See also ==
- Shirley Finn, a similar case in Western Australia
- Sallie-Anne Huckstepp
- Juanita Nielsen
