= Sallie-Anne Huckstepp =

Australian murder victim

- Born: Sallie-Anne Krivoshow; 12 December 1954
- Died: 6 February 1986 (aged 31); Centennial Park, Sydney, Australia
- Cause of death: Homicide
- Occupations: Writer, prostitute
- Status: Deceased
- Convictions: Prostitution; defraud; marijuana; heroin

Details
- Country: Australia

Sallie-Anne Huckstepp (née Krivoshow, 12 December 1954 – 6 February 1986) was an Australian writer, sex-worker and whistle blower, who was the victim of an underworld homicide. She came to attention in 1981 for speaking out about police corruption in Sydney. Huckstepp's murder remains unsolved.

== Life ==
Huckstepp was born as Sallie-Anne Krivoshow into a middle-class Jewish family and attended Dover Heights High School and Moriah College in Sydney. She left school at the age of 15 and married Bryan Huckstepp three years later. After travelling to Kalgoorlie, Western Australia, they later returned to Sydney, where Huckstepp continued to work as a sex-worker, eventually developing a heroin habit of her own.

In 1981, Huckstepp met and began a relationship with Warren Lanfranchi. Lanfranchi was a heroin dealer and standover man who worked with Neddy Smith. In June 1981, Lanfranchi allegedly robbed a Sydney heroin dealer and later fired shots at a young policeman. In Neddy: the Life and Crimes of Arthur Stanley Smith, Smith claims that Lanfranchi asked him to negotiate a payment with Detective Sergeant Roger Rogerson to escape being charged with the shooting.

Smith claims that Rogerson had instructed him to drive Lanfranchi to a meeting with him and to disarm him in the car. Rogerson took 18 police officers with him to the meeting. He claims that he was attempting to arrest Lanfranchi on suspicion of five bank robberies. At the meeting in Dangar Place, Chippendale, Rogerson shot and killed Lanfranchi. During the inquest into Lanfranchi's death, Rogerson claimed self-defense. He was supported at the inquest by Smith and other police officers who were called as witnesses.

The inquest found that on the balance of probabilities, Rogerson had been trying to arrest Lanfranchi, but refused to find he had acted in self defence. The matter went to the Supreme Court and was the subject of investigations by the New South Wales Ombudsman and Internal Affairs. No action was brought against Rogerson, and he was exonerated and commended for bravery.

On 15 July 1981, Huckstepp, accompanied by her father, Jack Krivoshow, and a legal-aid solicitor, went to the New South Wales Police Headquarters in College Street, Darlinghurst, where she met with Detective Inspector Ralph and Detective Reith of the New South Wales Police Internal Affairs Branch. She made the following statement which eventually helped lead to the Independent Commission Against Corruption and the Wood Royal Commission:

"I will tell you everything... I have the following criminal record: I have 31 convictions for prostitution. I have a conspiracy to defraud conviction which occurred shortly after I left Harry Bailey's tender care at "Chelmsford". I then had two further marijuana convictions. A heroin conviction when I was loaded up by Detectives Peter and Tomich at the Lido bar. I have a further "use" charge in which Detectives Peter George and Jungblut were involved. In both the latter offences, significant sums of money were paid to the police to affect the outcome... While operating as a prostitute, I made regular payments to members of the vice squad over 10 years. I have been involved in a number of transactions which I referred to in my statement which have involved substantial payment to members of the drug squad and other detectives relating to drug matters. I believe that the New South Wales Drug Squad and the Armed Hold-Up Squad are both totally corrupt and that they feed on the very activities which they are supposed to stop."

Huckstepp also went to the media and gave extensive interviews, claiming that Rogerson had murdered Lanfranchi and stolen $10,000 Lanfranchi was carrying to bribe Rogerson. She also claimed that Neddy Smith had lied to the inquest and was involved in a conspiracy with Rogerson. Rogerson maintained his innocence. In Neddy: The Life and Crimes of Arthur Stanley Smith, Smith wrote that Lanfranchi was "attempting to bribe Rogerson. I was the person [who] took Warren to this fatal meeting. There was an inquest and both sides threw plenty of shit at one another. I was right in the middle of it all. I could do nothing to bring Warren back to life, so I did the best thing I could. I know Warren's family suffered deeply, but I cannot do anything about it." He goes on to claim that as a result of his testimony at the inquest, Rogerson and other corrupt police officers gave him a "green light" to commit crime without fear of prosecution.

Huckstepp continued lobbying the media. A documentary about her life was made and she began writing articles for a monthly magazine. However, she continued using heroin, and in 1985, her then-partner David Kelleher was arrested on charges of importing heroin worth more than $2 million. With Kelleher remanded into custody, Huckstepp began a relationship with a federal police officer, Constable Peter Parker Smith. Huckstepp visited Kelleher regularly in prison, telling him she was attempting to get information from Constable Smith which could be useful in his trial. In Catch and Kill Your Own, Neddy Smith claims that Huckstepp was trying to help Kelleher by making tape recordings of her conversations with Constable Smith.

== Death and inquest ==
On the evening of 6 February 1986, Huckstepp received a phone call at Gwen’s flat. She rushed out, telling Gwen Beecroft (whom she stayed with at the time due to a friend - Scott McCrae - not telling Gwen who Sallie was) that she would be back shortly. The following morning, a man walking his dog found her body in Busby Pond, a lake in Centennial Park.

Huckstepp's murder resulted in one of the longest-running inquests of its kind in Australia. It began in 1987 and lasted until 1991, though it only sat for a total of 19 days in that time. It was alleged at the inquest that Huckstepp had gone to obtain a fresh supply of heroin and was then lured to Busby's Pond, a remote area of the park. She was then strangled and drowned by Neddy Smith who worked for Roger Rogerson. Peter Smith, the federal policeman with whom she was in a relationship, testified that she had told him she was frightened that Neddy Smith and Roger Rogerson or David Kelleher (who was in prison at the time) may try to murder her. He later told the Administrative Appeals Tribunal that Huckstepp's death was a "traumatic event for (him)". The coroner found that the evidence was insufficient to recommend charges and made a finding that Huckstepp had been murdered by a person or persons unknown.

Prior to the inquest, Neddy Smith was interviewed four times by four separate teams of detectives. He claims that he was at home with his wife the night Huckstepp was murdered. However, he was secretly recorded confessing to a cellmate at Long Bay Correctional Centre. He was recorded saying he had attacked Huckstepp from behind, punched her, grabbed her by the throat, lifted her off the ground, and then strangled her for about six minutes. Smith then claimed he dragged her into the pond and stood on her back to keep her head submerged for a few more minutes. He was also recorded saying, "strangling somebody is the hardest thing in the world...(but) the most satisfying thing I ever did in my life".

Smith later dismissed his confession as lies, saying he knew he was being taped and wanted the publicity for his new book, Catch and Kill Your Own. He is also alleged to have confessed to his publisher. Smith was subsequently charged in September 1996 with Huckstepp's murder, and was committed to stand trial, but was acquitted in 1999. In an interview with writer John Dale, Smith claimed that Huckstepp was murdered because she kept "bugging Roger, ringing him up and leaving messages that he was a dog... the reason they didn't bury her or dispose of the body was that Roger wanted her left floating in the pond as a message. The bloke who killed her has never been arrested and is not in jail".

Huckstepp is survived by a daughter, Sascha Huckstepp, who was born in 1973, and is an actress and casting agent in Sydney. Sascha had a minor role as a nurse in the Australian miniseries Blue Murder, which featured a character (played by Loene Carmen) based on her mother. In 1991 and 1992, she appeared as Jade Williams in the British soap opera Families. Huckstepp was also the half-sister of Australian screenwriter and actor Matt Kay.

== In popular culture ==
Huckstepp inspired the song "Sallie-Anne" by Sydney band Spy vs. Spy.

An episode of the documentary series Crime Investigation Australia depicted her murder.

The 1995 Australian television miniseries Blue Murder featured the story of Huckstepp's homicide.

== See also ==
- Juanita Nielsen
- Shirley Brifman
- Shirley Finn
