= Shirley Finn =

Australian brothel madam and murder victim

- Born: Shirley June Shewring; 2 November 1941; Fremantle, Western Australia, Australia
- Died: 22 or 23 June 1975 (aged 33); South Perth, Western Australia, Australia
- Cause of death: Murder, death by firearm
- Body discovered: Royal Perth Golf Club.
- Resting place: Karrakatta Cemetery, Perth
- Occupations: Brothel keeper, nightclub operator
- Known for: Whistleblower on police corruption, unsolved murder
- Spouse: Desmond (Des) John Michael Finn (Divorced) (Died 2009)
- Partner: Rosalie Dean (aka Black)
- Children: 3

Shirley June Finn, née Shewring (2 November 1941 – 22 or 23 June 1975), was an Australian brothel keeper, nightclub operator and socialite who was shot dead at about midnight on 22–23 June 1975 in Perth, Western Australia. Her body, dressed in an elaborate ball gown and expensive jewellery, was found at dawn in her car, which was parked on a golf course next to a busy freeway. The murder is notable because of Finn's close relationship with Western Australia Police detectives who, in that era, controlled and regulated Perth's prostitution and gambling activities. The crime remains unsolved.

A coronial inquest held between 2017 and 2020 returned an open finding with an acknowledgement that "it was most likely she was killed because she had tried to blackmail police about corruption."

== Early life and career ==
Shirley Finn was born Shirley Shewring on 2 November 1941 in Fremantle, Western Australia. A wartime baby, Shirley was the eldest child of a bomber pilot, and of necessity was brought up by her mother during her early years. After the war, Shirley's family lived in comfortable surroundings in Mount Pleasant, the riverside suburb of Perth, where she became a teenager before the birth of her two younger siblings. Though successful at her schoolwork, she was sexually active by age 14, which caused her to be committed for eight months to a notoriously cruel welfare home administered by the Catholic Church.

Biographer Juliet Wills recounts that Finn left school at age 15 and found work at a Perth frock shop, where she met her husband-to-be Des Finn, a 22-year-old air-force mechanic. They married and went to live in Melbourne, Victoria, where he continued his service with the Royal Australian Air Force and she worked as a sales assistant at Buckley & Nunn. Her sons, Steven and Shane, were born in 1959 and 1960 respectively. The family eventually transferred back to Perth, where daughter Bridget was born in 1961. (Bridget later adopted her mother's maiden name of Shewring.)

=== Sex business ===
When her husband suffered a serious injury and subsequent mental instability, Finn, aged 21, chose to engage in sex-oriented activities as a means of supporting her three children, including topless-dancing and body painting. From this she conducted such activities in association with a travelling fairground boxing troupe. She also joined a witchcraft coven which conducted "black magic and sex" activities in Kings Park. In 1969, Finn was conducting a "body painting and escort business" which was raided by police, and she was charged and convicted with "keeping premises for the purpose of prostitution." As a result, the family was socially ostracised and her children had to leave their Catholic primary school.

=== Regulated prostitution ===
Finn became associated with Dorothea Flatman, a brothel operator from King's Cross, Sydney, New South Wales, who transferred to Perth in 1968 and set up a number of brothels under the symbiotic protection of Australian vice overlord Abe Saffron and a policy of "containment" upheld by the Western Australian Police. Flatman, Stella Strong (also from Sydney) and Finn were among a privileged few allowed to operate in the prostitution business under the rigorous line management of Vice Squad chief Bernard Johnson.

== Murder ==
Finn's body was found by a motorcycle traffic officer at about 8.30 a.m. on Monday 23 June 1975, in her parked Dodge DG Phoenix near the ninth fairway of the Royal Perth Golf Club, South Perth. The location was clearly visible from the adjacent Kwinana Freeway, from which it was then separated only by a waist-high fence and an access road (Melville Parade). Inside the car, Finn's body was slumped behind the wheel with four bullet holes in her head. She wore valuable diamond jewellery which had not been touched.

=== Crime-scene location "botched" ===
It has been alleged by Wills that the long-established police map of the crime scene is grossly erroneous, incorrectly locating Finn's car near the fifth tee, more than 100 metres (330 ft) from the ninth green, near the golf clubhouse, where the body was found. The erroneous police map was officially adopted for decades, causing evidence of eyewitnesses to be ignored or discounted as not in accord with the map.

=== Rumours ===
At the time, various rumours regarding the murder attributed it to specific issues relating to prostitution and the way it was being handled by police and government in Perth, but no evidence of this was made public.

== Purported investigations ==
The murder, and the implied connections to the local police and sex industry, resulted in a Royal Commission being held. Continued interest in Finn's murder, and the apparent lack of evidence, led to periodic speculation as to the murderer's identity and has been the subject of numerous articles and television pieces, as well as two books—Juliet Wills's Dirty Girl and David Whish-Wilson's crime novel Line of Sight. There is evidence that major Sydney underworld figures were in Perth at the time, including Saffron and corrupt police officer Roger Rogerson, yet no significant line of investigation was pursued by the police.

In 1985, according to the then state premier Brian Burke, a "very senior police officer" was under investigation for murder, resulting in that officer's retirement and the matter then being deemed to have been "resolved". The West Australian newspaper reported Burke's belief that the subject killing was that of Finn. On the thirtieth anniversary of the murder—23 June 2005—a cold-case review was announced. An opinion was canvassed that no solution of the case was likely.

In 2014, another cold-case review was launched by Western Australian Police. The following year, the Corruption and Crime Commission confirmed it had received new information about the murder. News reports said a former policeman had spoken about seeing Finn with detectives in the bar of the old central police station, in East Perth, on the night she was killed. As of 7 September 2017, no further information had been released by police about their cold-case review.

On 6 March 2017, the ABC Television documentary series Australian Story aired a piece titled "Getting Away With Murder" which revealed that a coronial inquest would be conducted later that year. The story also presented testimony from Finn's former driver, Leigh Beswick, that she had an extended relationship with then police minister Ray O'Connor.

== Coronial inquest ==
The inquest scheduled to open on 11 September 2017 was in fact commenced on Tuesday 29 August to take evidence from former detective James Archibald Boland about an officially documented 1975 rumour that Sydney criminal Neddy Smith had flown to Perth "for an arranged meeting with [Finn] and an unnamed police officer."

The public hearing was adjourned on 20 December 2017 and resumed on 23 July 2018. After a week, it was again adjourned for six months, "allowing new leads to be followed up and two scientific investigations to be completed". Coroner Barry King acknowledged limitations but had not given up hope. He urged persons with information to come forward.

=== Witnesses ===
==== Heard in 2017 ====
James Archibald Boland (29 August) said he had met a man named Keith Alan Lewis who told him that Smith flew to Perth on 23 June and was "paid $5000 to kill [Finn] on behalf of her business partners." An official police document, known as "serial 393", was produced to support Boland's claim that "Mr Lewis had been willing to provide information about Smith in exchange for fraud charges against his boyfriend being downgraded." Following suggestions that Smith was aiming to take control of Perth brothels, Boland said he was ordered by former CIB boss Don Hancock not to have any further involvement in the inquiry.

Bridget Shewring (13 September), daughter of the deceased, claimed her 1975 statement was twisted or mishandled by detectives, and that her mother's partner Rose Black may not have revealed all she knows.

Phillip Hooper (13 September) testified that he saw nightclub owner Lawrence Tudori and another man at the scene of the crime and that he was subsequently intimidated into silence by them and Bruce Wilson, a former Australian Workers Union leader.

Frank Zanetti (18 September), is a former deputy commissioner of the Western Australian Police who, as a detective sergeant, had signed Lewis's statement about Smith. He had no memory of any action taken to investigate the Smith tip-off. Despite recognition of the omission in 1993, the police did not interview Smith until 2014 and had not yet disclosed any details.

[Zanetti] was asked how so many reports from the investigation had seemingly disappeared, why his name and signature appeared on countless police documents he had no memory of, and why – after only four months – it appeared police began to wind down the investigation.

Jacqueline De Gaye (19 September), a close friend of Finn who wrote down and kept details of conversations occurring two days before the murder, in which Finn said she had received a death threat from Owen Leitch, who was about to become police commissioner.

John Mearns (20 September) reported to police the presence of a small green vehicle at the murder scene and was told the evidence was not needed. Mearns has also reported being warned that he was potentially in danger from police.

Steve Couacaud (20 September) thought he saw Hancock getting into Finn's car near the time of the murder.

Ray Gardner (20 September), a taxi driver, claimed to have seen O'Connor shoot a lady twice in the head and then fire at the taxi. Details of his evidence were at odds with known facts, e.g., he said it was a "beautiful fine day" when it was actually raining heavily.

Edward (Ted) and Elaine Moseley (20 November) said they saw a woman at the golf course matching Rose Black's description on the night of the murder.

Gregory Hall (21 November) testified that he was a bagman for Vice Squad chief Bernie Johnson, whom he feared.

Brian Eddy (21 November) is the former motorcycle traffic officer who said he saw Ms Finn with Johnson at the police canteen shortly before she was killed.

Geoffrey McMurray (21 November), a motorcycle traffic officer, was first to discover the crime scene and noted the early arrival and departure of Johnson.

Leigh Varis-Beswick (22 November) had been employed as Finn's driver "from about 1968 to 1971, before going on to work as a prostitute for Ms Finn". She was at some time in a relationship with corrupt police officer Tony Lewandowski, who allegedly told her in 2004 that he was present when Hancock shot and killed Finn. Lewandowski had previously admitted fabricating evidence in the Perth Mint Swindle.

Maxwell Raymond Healy (23 November), a past associate of Hancock, Johnson and O'Connor, testified that he was beaten up at the Zanzibar nightclub for talking about having seen Johnson on the night and in the neighbourhood of the murder scene. At Wooroloo Prison, O'Connor implicated Johnson in procuring (from a police store) the rifle used to kill Finn.

Ron William Brown (23 November) confirmed he accompanied Johnson on a long sea journey after Finn's death, but rejected a suggestion that Johnson had thrown a rifle overboard.

Michael Joseph Regan (24 November) is a former junior police officer who used to drive for all the top detectives and knew that Johnson had targeted Finn to be killed.

Peter Burns (28 November), a former security guard at the University of Western Australia, said police ignored his evidence and falsely fabricated his statement when he reported seeing and speaking to Finn near the campus at about 11.30 the night she was killed.

Rose Black (29 November), Finn's partner, testified that Finn had large tax debts she could not afford and that she was meeting a man she called "the Bear" who was "bringing someone over from Sydney" to sort out her tax bill.

Glen Maxwell Properjohn (30 November), a friend and dressmaker to Finn, expressed his instinctive belief that Johnson had arranged a contract killing by a Sydney hitman.

Robin Thoy (11 December) is a former detective who knew and feared the 'purple circle' police clique as "pretty powerful people" who "could do whatever they wanted."

Laurie Tyler (11 December) was then a young detective, who saw Saffron, Rogerson and Johnson drinking together at Saffron's Raffles Hotel. He learned not to ask questions.

Kevin Parker (11 December) is the "Keith Alan Lewis" alleged by Boland to have implicated Smith as an interstate hitman. Testifying via phone link from Melbourne, Parker strongly denied and ridiculed counsel's suggestion that he tried to do "a deal" with Boland to help a friend.

Lindsay Okamoto, who was involved in the initial murder investigation, said he had no concerns about the "purple circle" of senior police (whom he identified as Catholics) and that rumours of Johnson's involvement did not emerge until ten years after the event.

Chris Ferris (13 December), a police officer for 27 years, said Det. Arthur Simms 'confessed' to pulling the trigger on Finn who had been "not playing the game".

Bob Meyers (13 December) is a convicted horse-race fixer with police friends including Colin Pace, who told him Johnson had shot Finn with a gun from the police armoury.

William Burnett (20 December), a former policeman, testified that he searched for the .22-calibre Anschütz rifle used in the killing but was unaware that a rifle of that type was missing from police custody.

Linda Watson (20 December), who was a Perth brothel madam in the 1980s, said Johnson threatened that she would "end up like Shirley Finn" if she did not co-operate with him; and that she paid police officers about $2,000 a week.

==== Heard in 2018 ====
Bernie Johnson (excluded as a witness) was head of the Vice Squad at the time of the murder. He was the subject of a written submission by his doctor, Folo Bella, read to the inquest on 12 December 2017. Johnson had been diagnosed with Alzheimer's disease and the doctor concluded, "I am of the opinion he has no testamentary capability to give evidence or make any reasonable contribution to any legal proceedings." Johnson's death was reported in April 2018, while the inquest was in recess.

Trevor Lawrence and Gary Timms (22 July), who were police constables in 1975, gave evidence about their presence in the police canteen at the time a page was ripped out of the visitors' book. Both said they had not seen Finn on the night when a drunken senior sergeant objected to the presence of two female teenagers who were associating with junior constables.

Bruce Scott (24 July), a former assistant police commissioner who retired in 1992, denied having ordered two junior officers to "get rid of" certain Finn-related case exhibits. Counsel assisting the coroner, Toby Bishop, cited an unidentified officer who had made the allegation when interviewed by the Corruption and Crime Commission.

==== Heard in 2019 ====
Craig Klauber (1 April), a CSIRO chemist, said that a workmate named Carolyn Langan, who had been a lover of Johnson, had confided in him in the late 1980s that he had made a "bedtime confession" to having killed Finn. Ms Langan denied the confession had happened.

"Witness L" (identity suppressed) (3 April) said she had been the partner of a vice-squad detective, Bob Nevin, who told her that he had shot Finn in the head under an order from police headquarters to "get rid of the problem" on the night she turned up asking to speak to the police commissioner about the tax she was paying on graft. Nevin resigned in 1981 after he was found to be co-owning a brothel with fellow officer Tony Wick.

Bob Maher (3 April) a nightclub operator, said there were rumours connecting a violent bouncer and convicted murderer, Walter Coman, with Finn's killing.

=== Findings ===
Closing the inquest in June 2019, Coroner Barry King announced that there had been "incompetence" in the police investigation and that there were "too many suspects", while vital evidence had "disappeared", including the murder weapon and the victim's car.

In his final report published on 12 August 2020, King found "it was most likely Finn was killed because she had tried to blackmail police about corruption." However, there was a lack of reliable or cogent evidence to identify the killer from a group of suspects which included at least three Western Australian Police officers. Named suspects included police officers Bernie Johnson, Robert Nevin and Don Hancock, together with Sydney criminal Neddy Smith. The victim's daughter, Bridget Shewring, said "... the inquest should have been held when my brothers and I first applied in 2005, when everybody was still alive."

== See also ==
- Crime in Western Australia
- List of unsolved murders (1900–1979)
- Prostitution in Australia
- Shirley Brifman, a similar case involving Queensland police and NSW police
- Sallie-Anne Huckstepp
- Juanita Nielsen
- Sydney Hilton Hotel bombing
- List of unsolved murders in Western Australia
