= Mark Foy (businessman) =

Australian businessman (1865–1950)

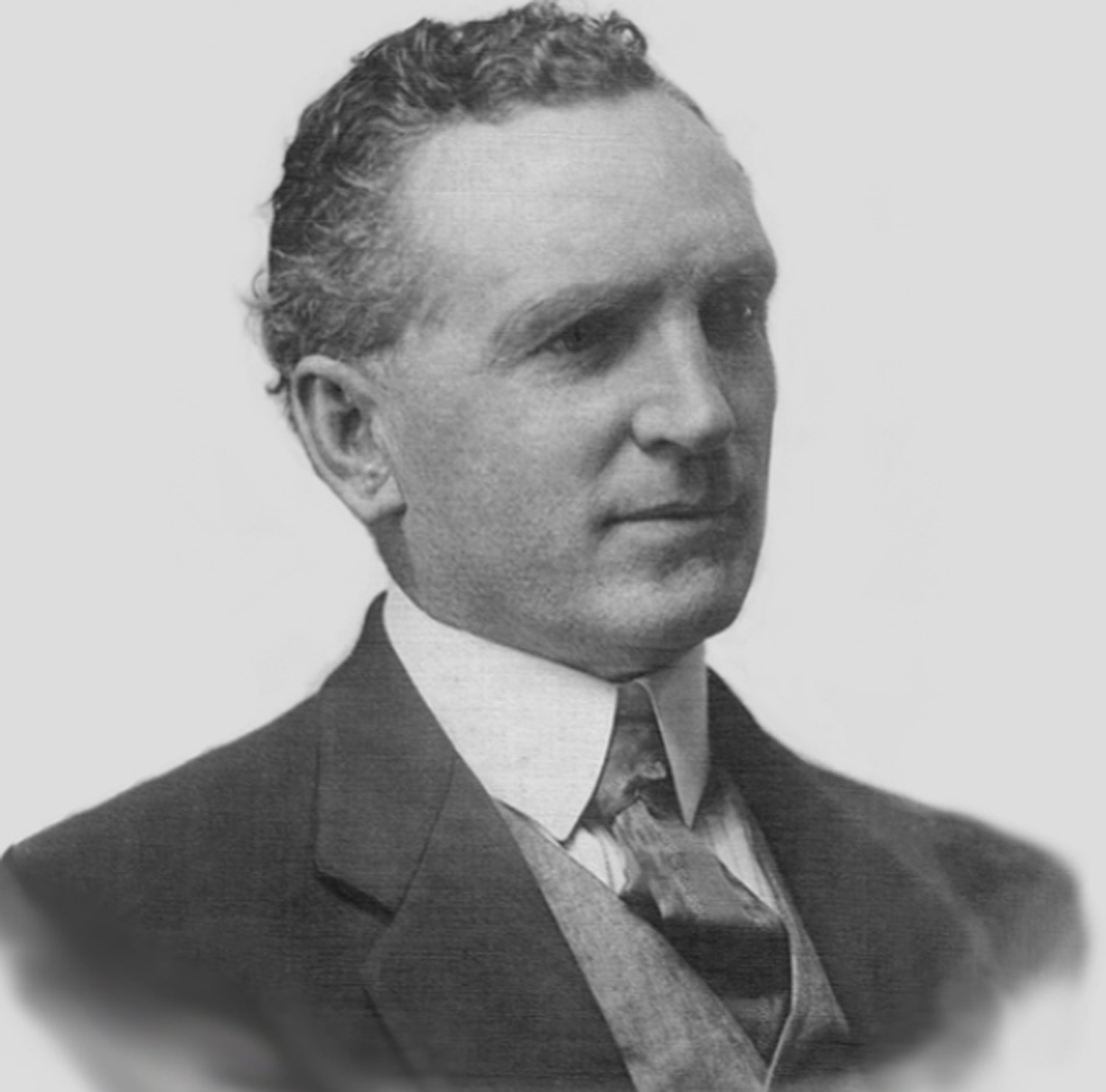
- Foy Pictured c. 1910
- Born: 15 February 1865; Bendigo, Victoria, Australia
- Died: 15 November 1950 (aged 85); Australia
- Occupation: Businessman
- Known for: Co Founder of Mark Foy's (department stores), Creating the Hydro Majestic Hotel
- Family: Mark Foy Snr. (father), Juanita Nielsen (great - niece

Mark Foy (15 February 1865 – 15 November 1950) was an Australian retail businessman and entrepreneur who established the department store Mark Foy's in Sydney. He also opened the Hydro Majestic Hotel in the Blue Mountains, a hydropathic resort with Swiss doctors and spa water from Baden in Germany. In addition he was a keen sportsman with interests in rifle shooting, boxing, sailing and motor racing.

== Early life ==
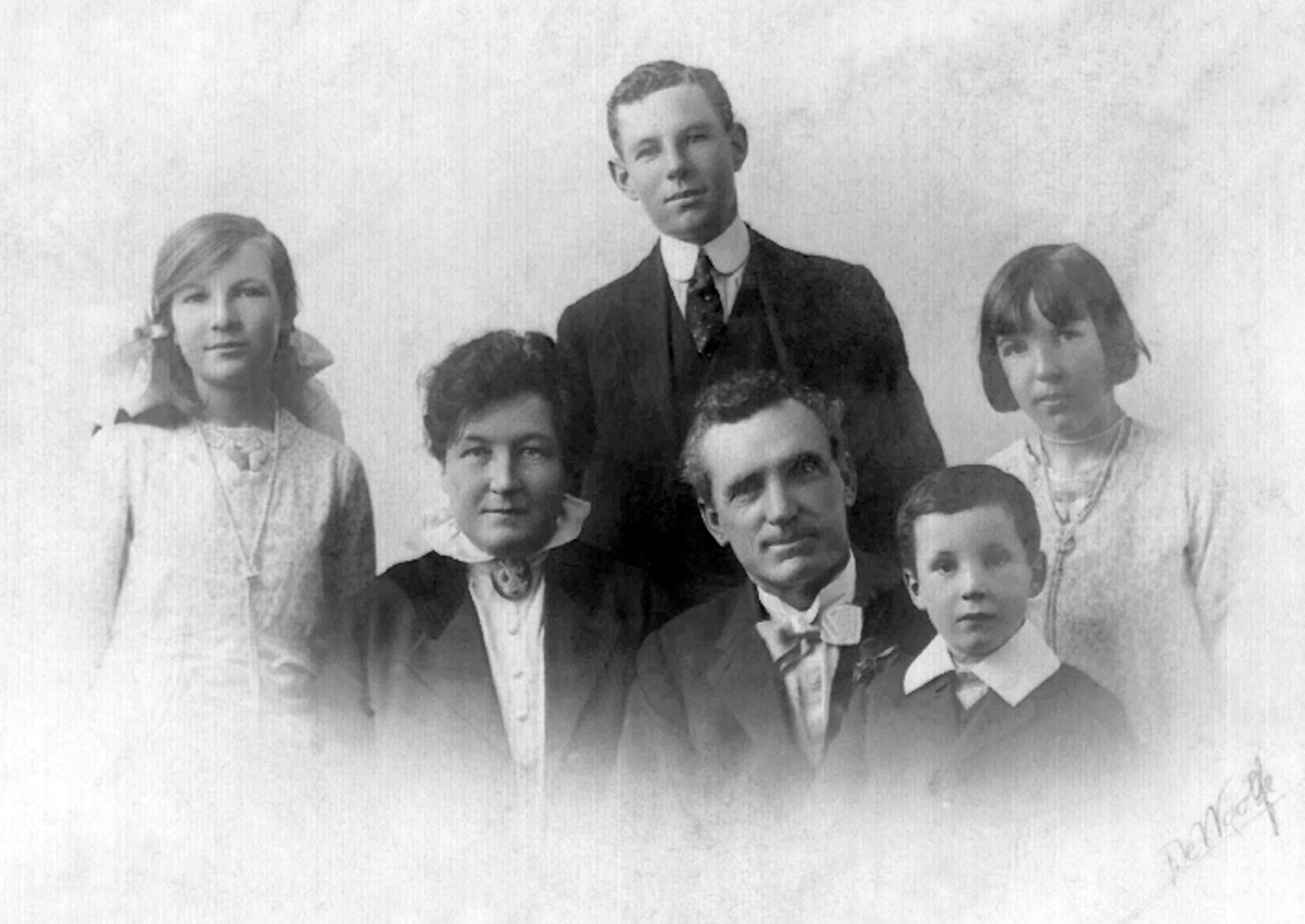
Mark Foy and his wife Elizabeth with their four children

Mark Foy was born in Bendigo, Victoria on 15 February 1865. His father, Mark Foy Snr., had emigrated from Ireland in 1858. Foy's parents had gone to the goldfields establishing various stores. In 1870, Foy's father moved to Melbourne where he set up a drapery shop in Smith Street, Collingwood. This business prospered, occupying three shops by 1875 and six by 1880. Suffering from ill health, Foy Snr. and his wife left for Europe, handing the firm to their eldest son, Francis. In San Francisco his health worsened and Foy Snr. died on 14 January 1884. Soon afterwards Francis sold the stores. In 1885, Francis went to Sydney with his younger brother, Mark Jr., to establish a new business under his father's name.

== Mark Foy's Department store ==
The brothers opened their Sydney store in 1885 in Oxford Street. The business expanded rapidly and more surrounding stores were opened. A London buying office was set up in 1890, and additional premises in Oxford Street were purchased in 1894. Mark Foy's Fair, a sale usually staged twice a year, became a highly anticipated event on the Sydney shopping calendar.

In 1888 Mark Foy married Annie Davey (1864-1921), the daughter of John Davey, a merchant from Melbourne. The couple had no children and in 1900 they were granted a divorce by the NSW Court. In the same year he married Elizabeth Dominica Tweedie who was the head of the Dressmaking Department in his Oxford Street Store. Elizabeth was also advertised by the store as being a leading fashion expert and designer. The couple had four children, two sons and two daughters.

== Sporting life ==
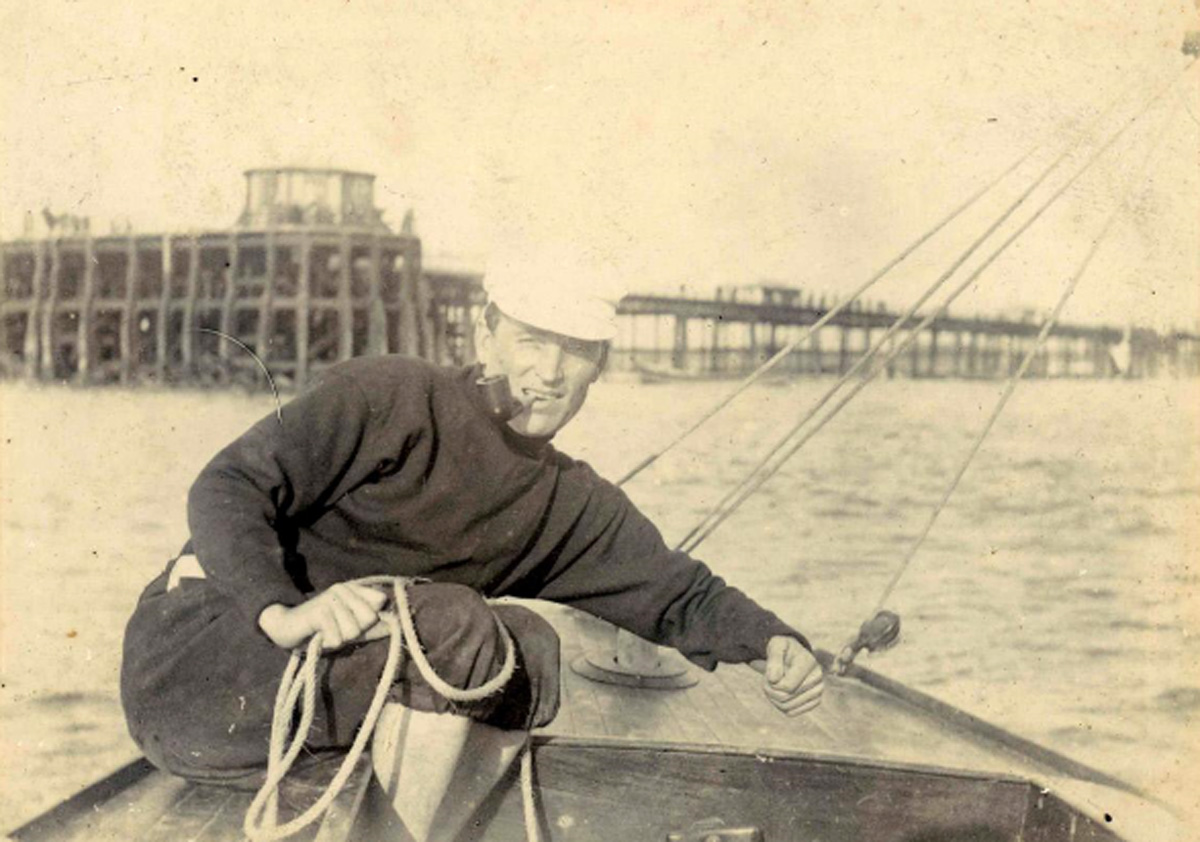
Mark Foy in a sailing boat

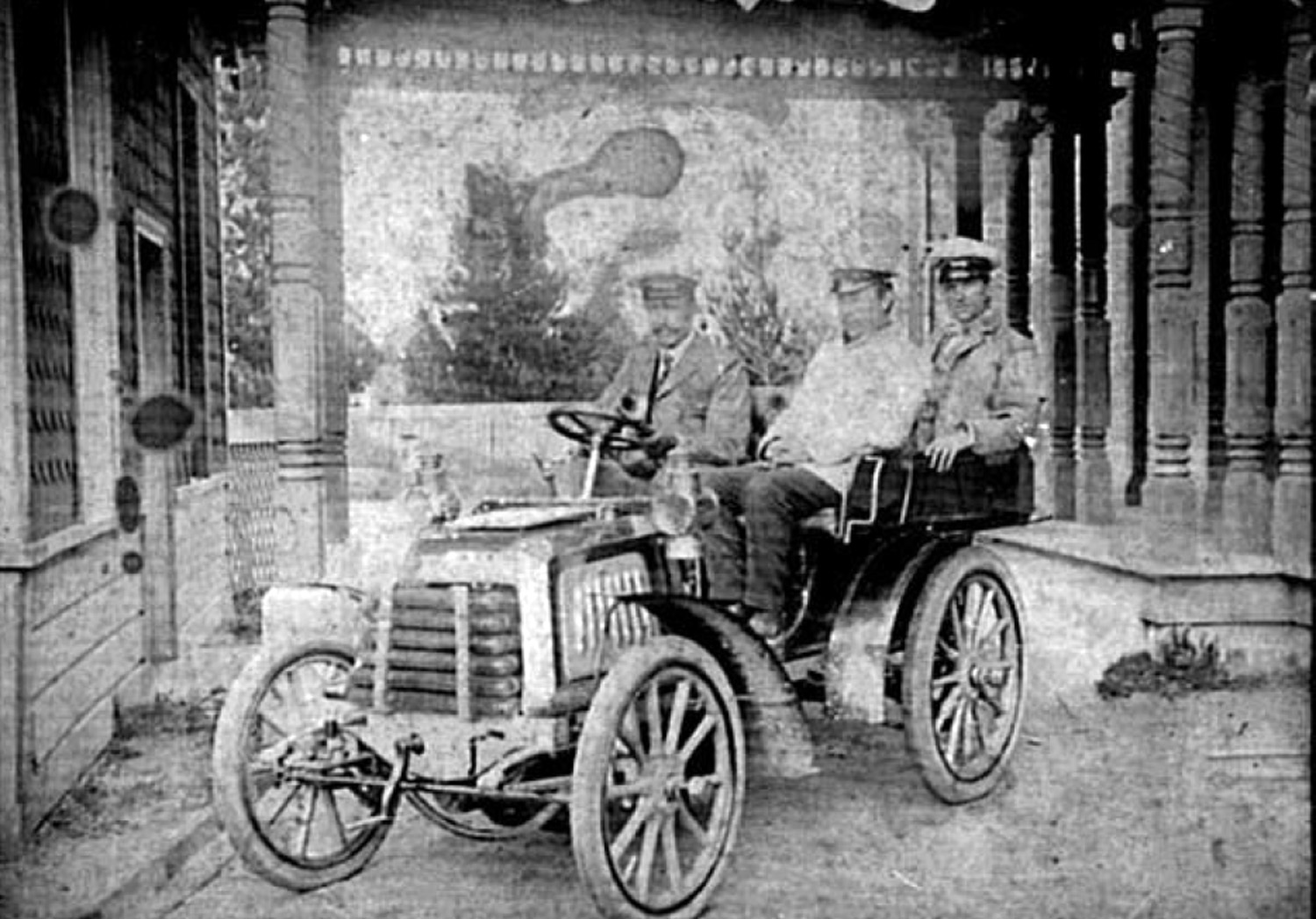
Mark Foy (far right) in his Panhard 1901

In 1891 Mark Foy founded the Sydney Flying Squadron Yacht Club. Challenging the sailing conventions of that time by having coloured sails and prize money, the Squadron’s boats were banned from the 1892 National Regatta because they carried coloured emblems. It was claimed that the emblems encouraged gambling and spoiled the look of the white sails on Sydney Harbour. In response, Foy organised an opposition regatta which he financed himself and advertised it as a spectacle which could be enjoyed by all members of the public regardless of their social background.

In 1898, as Commodore of the Yacht Club, he took his 22 foot boat Irex to England to participate in Australia’s first International Race. Despite not emerging as the winner, the race was a groundbreaking event that began a long history of international competition.

Mark was also a motor car enthusiast and owned numerous vehicles. He participated in many motoring events and is pictured here in one of his cars which he imported from France. A Panhard, it was described by the Telegraph as “the first of the powerful French motors to reach Australia”. In 1905 he was interviewed by a reporter and he said that at that time he had fourteen cars in his stable – two Daimlers, two Panhards, seven De Dions, one Liberia, one Firefly and one Oldsmobile.

In October 2019 Foy was inducted to the Australian Sailing Hall of Fame.

== The Hydro Majestic ==
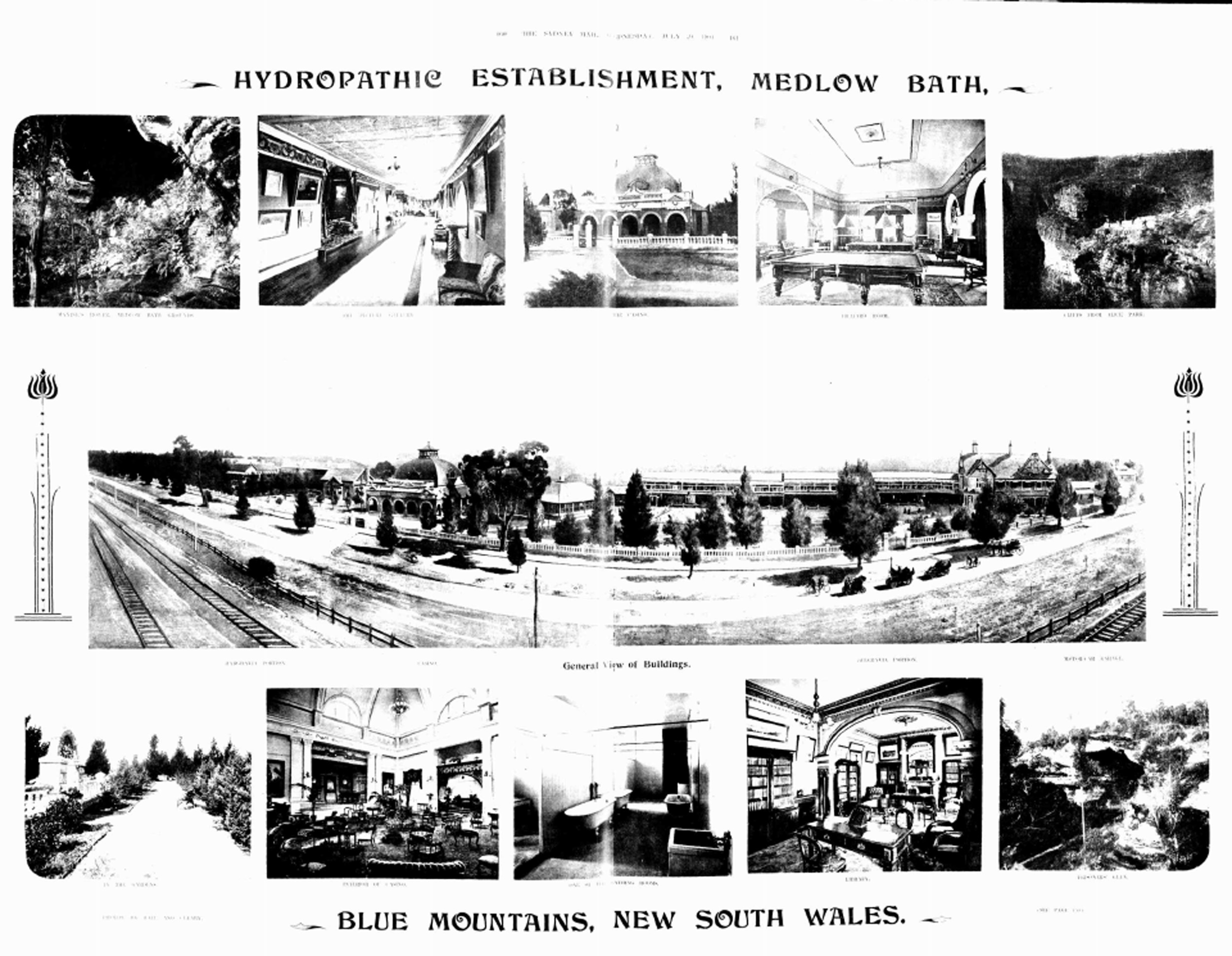
Advertisement for the Hydro Majestic shortly after it opened in 1904

In July 1904 Mark Foy opened the Hydro Majestic Hotel at Medlow Bath. Several years previously he had bought the Belgravia Hotel and the residence of William Hargraves (the son of Edward Hargraves discoverer of gold in Australia). Between these he placed the domed concert and dance hall (called the casino) which he had shipped from Chicago. They were linked by buildings one of which was a long gallery which can be seen in the photo on the right. This was described in a newspaper article shortly before the hotel opened in the following terms.

"The two main buildings are connected by a corridor 700ft long by 14ft in width, and over this are bedrooms 12ft by 12ft, and others 14ft by 14ft. The corridor itself will be used as a picture gallery. As its windows look out upon the Kanimbla Valley when the eyes grow tired of dwelling upon the artistic productions of the masters, they have but to glance out of the windows to feast upon one of the most magnificent sights that Nature has ever provided."

The hotel had its own electricity plant, boiler and ice houses, sewerage plant, library, hotel shop, billiard room, grand dining room, art gallery and a telephone in every guest room.

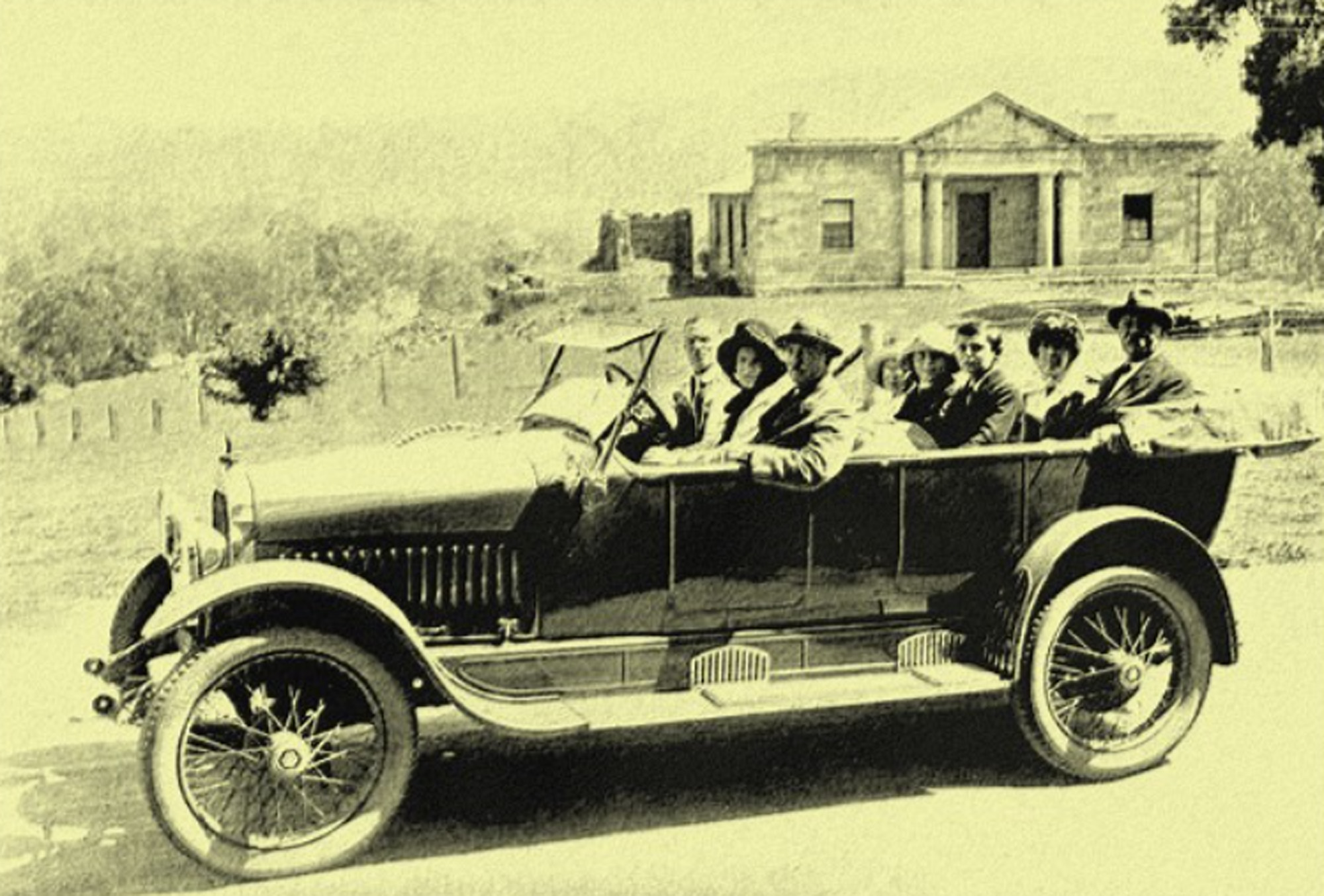
Sir Arthur Conan Doyle and his wife Jean (in the back seat) during their stay at the Hydro Majestic in 1921

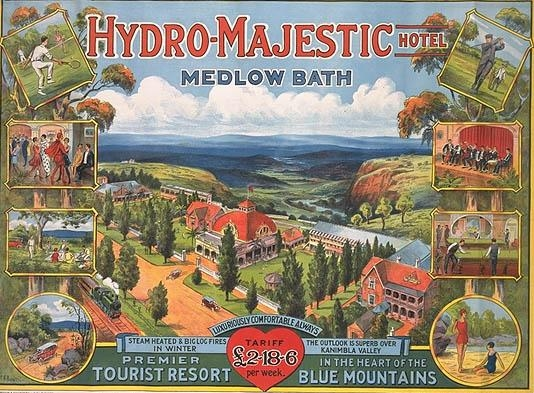
Advertisement for the Hydro Majestic in about 1920

The hydropathic therapies were not a success so Mark Foy changed the marketing of the hotel. From 1906 it was advertised as a luxury hotel for the rich and fashionable providing fine food and entertainment. It was patronised by many famous people. Dame Nellie Melba sang at the hotel a number of times as did English Opera singer Dame Clara Butt and Nellie Stewart.

Australia's first Prime Minister Sir Edmund Barton died in the hotel in 1920. Other famous patrons were Sherlock Holmes' creator Sir Arthur Conan Doyle, and the Rajah of Pudukkutai with his Australian-born wife, the former Molly Fink. Sir Arthur Conan Doyle wrote about the hotel in his autobiographical travel book. He said.

"We recuperated after our Brisbane tour by spending the next week at Medlow Bath, that little earthly paradise, which is the most restful spot we have found in our wanderings. It was built originally by Mr. Mark Foy, a successful draper of Sydney, and he is certainly a man of taste, for he has adorned it with a collection of prints and of paintings— hundreds of each— which would attract attention in any city, but which on a mountain top amid the wildest scenery give one the idea of an Arabian Nights palace. There was a passage some hundreds of yards long, which one has to traverse on the way to each meal, and there was a certain series of French prints, representing events of Byzantine history, which I found it difficult to pass, so that I was often a late comer. A very fair library is among the other attractions of this remarkable place."

Mark Foy used two of his Daimlers to take his guests to Jenolan Caves and Sir Arthur Conan Doyle and his family went on one of these tours. A photo of this event is shown. Sir Arthur is in the back seat with his wife Jean.

In 1922 there was a fire at the hotel and it destroyed the Belgravia hotel, the Belgravia Wing and the art gallery with its entire collection of pictures. These were replaced with the art deco buildings which remain today.

Mark Foy died in November 1950 at the age of 85 and was buried in South Head Cemetery in Vaucluse.
