= National Crime Authority =

Former Australian criminal investigative agency

The National Crime Authority (NCA) was an Australian law enforcement agency established in 1984 and wound up on 31 December 2002.

== History ==
The NCA was set up in 1984 in the wake of the Costigan Commission, which investigated tax evasion and organised crime. It was intended to lead a national law enforcement response to organised crime which could overcome the jurisdictional barriers of the Australian federal system.

It had extraordinary powers which removed many of the barriers which prevented other enforcement organisations from being able to comprehensively investigate or prosecute.

The NCA was frequently criticised both for misuse of these powers and lack of effectiveness. Some argue that perception was often due to the covert operations and extreme secrecy required as a direct result of the level of criminals being targeted, and the risk to the operatives and their families.

The staff and operatives of the NCA were often reminded by the chairman that "we are dealing with the most evil, calculating and manipulative people who have significant financial resources and good reason to stop us in our work or harm us as individuals".

The role of the NCA was essentially to gather the intelligence surrounding a specific matter and then hand the matter across to either AFP, ATO or Customs, along with the assistance of the relevant state police force to effect a strike on the known targets. For the reasons stated, the NCA operatives were never known or seen to the general public, and the credit for the success of the operation went to those in the public light of the media releases, generally the AFP or Customs.

Businessman and former Liberal Party President John Elliott accused the NCA of running a vendetta against him inspired by the then Labor government. Elliott sued the NCA claiming $75 million in damages after he was changed with and acquitted of foreign exchange violations before dropping his claim in July 2000.

On 1 January 2003, the NCA, the Australian Bureau of Criminal Intelligence (ABCI) and the Office of Strategic Crime Assessments (OSCA) were superseded by the Australian Crime Commission (ACC).

== Murder of Geoffrey Bowen ==
A targeted killing of NCA Senior Investigator Det Sgt Geoffrey Bowen occurred on 2 March 1994 at the Adelaide office, on Waymouth Street. Bowen was killed by opening a specifically and personally addressed parcel bomb, with a force so severe that it blew out the window of the building on the 12th floor. Bowen was the senior investigator on Operation Cerberus, an investigation into Italian organised crime in Australia. An NCA staff member also lost an eye and suffered severe burns to 40% of his body as a result of the incident. The accused Domenic Perre was standing on top of a nearby carpark and was later arrested at his house.

On 1 March 2018, the then 61-year-old Perre was charged with murder and attempted murder for the attack after a 2 1/2-year investigation involving state-of-the-art DNA techniques. He pleaded not guilty in the Adelaide Magistrates Court on 17 February 2020 but his lawyer conceded that there is a case to answer and he was committed to stand trial in the Supreme Court of South Australia. In March 2021, Perre's trial was proceeding in the Supreme Court of South Australia. In June 2022, Perre was found guilty of the 1994 murder of Det Sgt Geoffrey Bowen and the attempted murder of Peter Wallis. Perre died in 2023.
