= Wales House, Sydney =

Heritage-listed building in Sydney, Australia

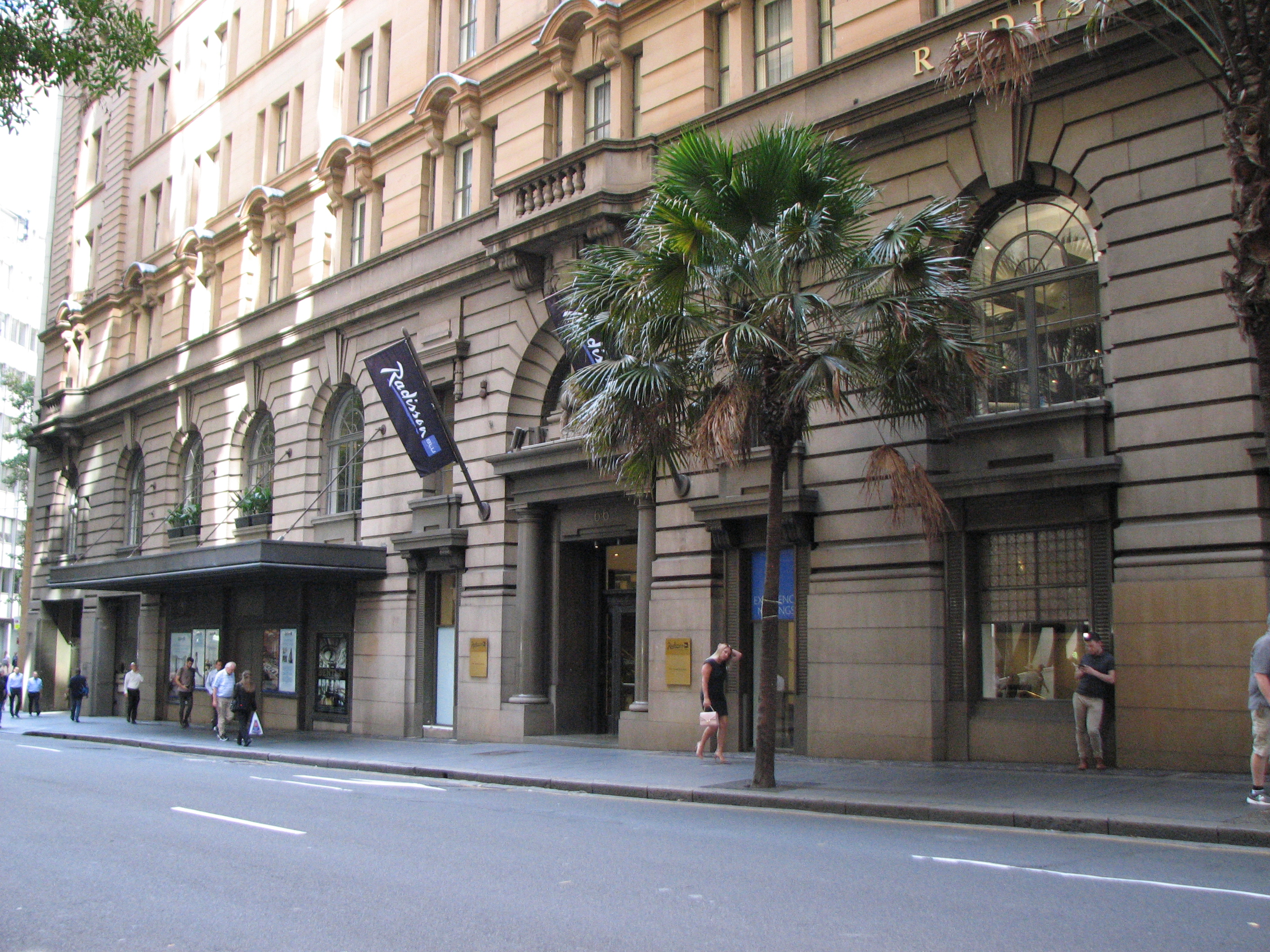
- Wales House, 64–66 Pitt Street, Sydney in 2019

- Location within Sydney Location within Australia
- 33.8653°S 151.2090°E
- Location: 64–66 Pitt Street, Sydney central business district, City of Sydney, New South Wales, Australia

History
- Built: 1922–1929

Site notes
- Architect(s): Manson & Pickering
- Architectural style: Interwar Commercial Renaissance Palazzo
- Owner: Wales House Nominees Pty Ltd

New South Wales Heritage Register
- Official name: Wales House; Bank of NSW Building
- Type: State heritage (built)
- Designated: 2 April 1999
- Reference no.: 586
- Type: Commercial Office/Building
- Category: Commercial
- Builders: Stuart Bros.

Wales House is a heritage-listed former newspaper office building, bank building and now hotel located at 64–66 Pitt Street, in the Sydney central business district, in the City of Sydney local government area of New South Wales, Australia. It was designed by Manson & Pickering and built from 1922 to 1929 by Stuart Bros. It is also known as the Bank of NSW Building. The property is owned by Wales House Nominees Pty Ltd. It was added to the New South Wales State Heritage Register on 2 April 1999. Located on the junction of Pitt, Hunter and O'Connell Streets, the building served as offices for John Fairfax and Sons' The Sydney Morning Herald from 1927 to 1955 before being acquired by the Bank of New South Wales, commonly known as "The Wales", hence the building's name. The building has subsequently been converted into an international hotel, as part of the Radisson Blu hotel chain.

== History ==
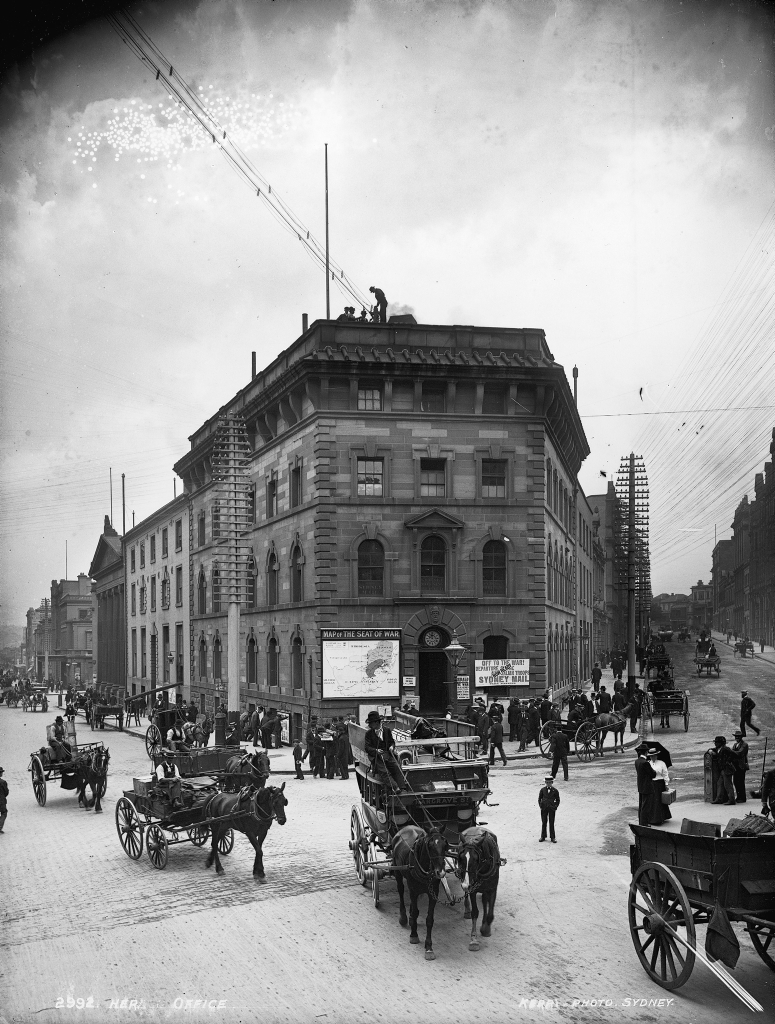
Sydney Morning Herald building built in 1856 on the same site, demolished in the 1920s for the present building

The Fairfax family controlled The Sydney Morning Herald for nearly a century and a half: the dynasty played a dominant role in Sydney society and the paper had an exceptional prestige. The newspaper first built offices on the corner of Pitt, Hunter and O’Connell Streets in 1856 when James Reading Fairfax joined his father, the founding John Fairfax, as a partner in the family business.

By 1920 the newspaper had outgrown the 1856 building and when James Fairfax finally died in 1919 his son, James Oswald Fairfax demolished his father's offices and commissioned Manson and Pickering to build the present block. The contractors, Stuart Bros, erected it in three stages, completing the sections in 1924, 1927 and 1929. The 1856 building remained in use until stage I was completed in 1924 and was then demolished.

The sandstone building was clad at the lower levels in trachyte from Loveridge and Hudson's quarries at Mount Gibraltar, Bowral, and was richly caparisoned internally with Caleula marble. It was largely used by the Sydney Morning Herald staff, but also had a number of tenants as well as, after 1934, both the SMH Art Gallery and the offices of Art in Australia.

In 1954–1955 a new Sydney Morning Herald building was erected off Broadway and the 1922–1929 building was sold to the Bank of New South Wales (now Westpac), which took possession in 1956, opening a public branch-office in 1958. Various internal changes took place and a car park was inserted in the sub-basement where the SMH had been printed for thirty years.

== Description ==
=== Fairfax & Sons phase ===
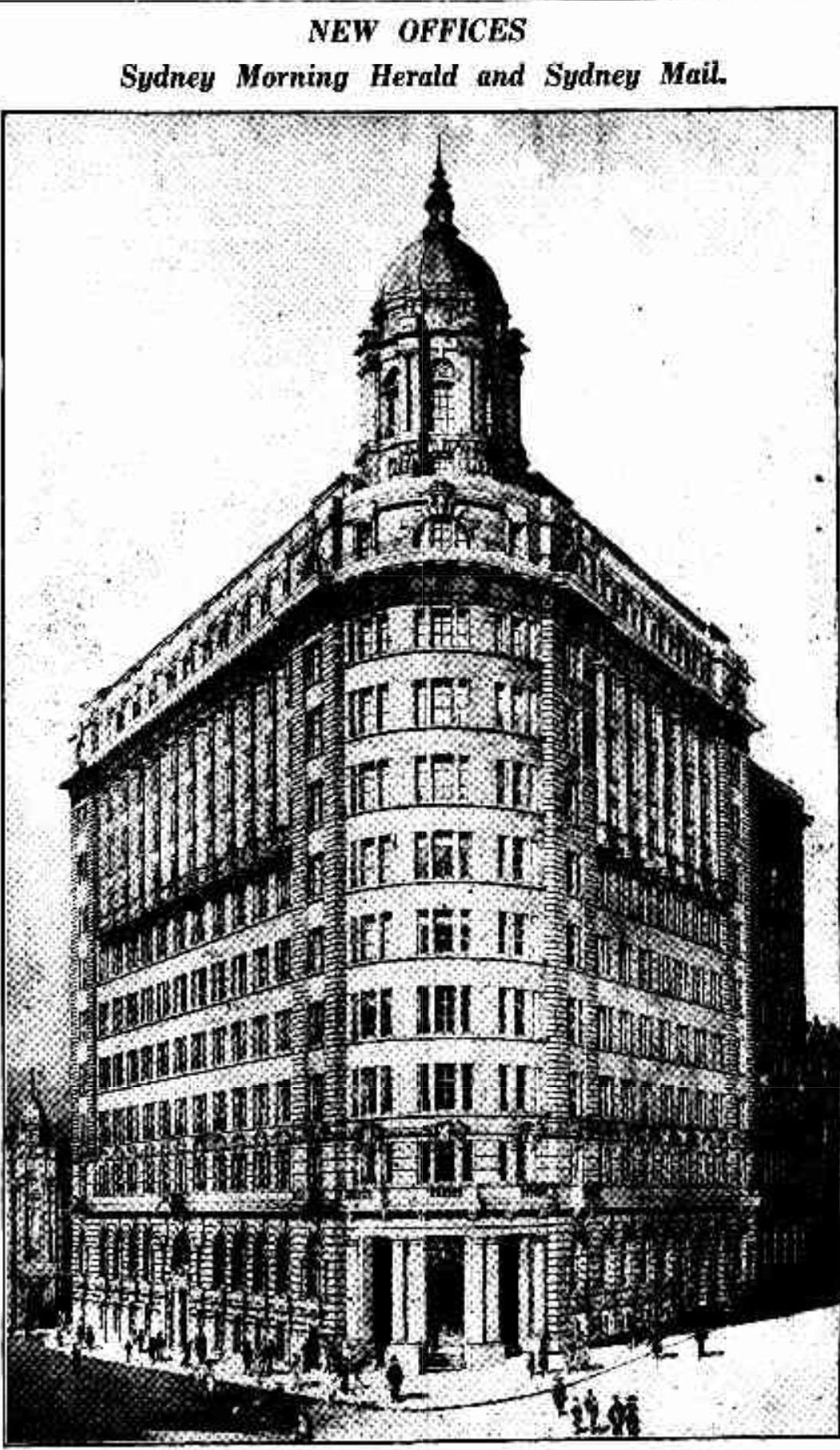
Sketch of the new building, 1924

Completed in the Interwar Commercial Renaissance Palazzo style, Wales House was noted in the Building magazine "to be the largest building in the Southern Hemisphere".

Wales House consisted of twelve floors including the basement at Pitt Street Entrance plus sub-basement. The materials used included reinforced concrete for the structural frame, floors, stairs, roof and awning roof. The street facade was fashionable - conservative "Modern Renaissance" or "Italian Renaissance Palazzo" modelled on Florentine and Roman Palaces of the fifteenth and sixteenth centuries. The basement and ground floors were clad in Bowral Trachyte. Sydney sandstone was used on all floors. The windows were zinc sprayed steel framed.

The main entrance was situated on the Hunter Street Corner on the ground floor. Pitt Street contained two entrances for lessees at the Basement Floor whilst O'Connell Street contained one entrance for The Sydney Morning Herald staff and two loading docs. The basement, ground and first floors were heavily rusticated, also the projecting bays which terminated the Pitt and O'Connell Street, facades. The first floor's rectangular windows were arranged in triplets and surmounted by arched hoods linked by a continuous string course. Above the first floor plain ashlar walling was punctuated by plain triplet windows with a prominent continuous sill course.

Balconies were provided on the first floor over Pitt and Hunter Street entrances and in protecting bays; and on the sixth floor between the bays. A range of attached Tuscan columns extended from the balconies to the ninth floor supporting a deep entablature extending around the entire perimeter of the street frontages. Bay windows were placed between the columns. The entablature consisted of an architrave "frieze and cornice projecting 1.2 metres and supported by a massive reinforced concrete cantilever. Above the cornice was the attic storey at which the projecting bays were terminated by decorated semi-circular windows, while between were single, hooded window in plain ashlar walling. Each facade was surmounted by a simple string course and parapet".

A reinforced concrete awning roof was constructed above the roof level, on which were located left motor rooms and ventilation plant rooms. The Hunter Street main entrance consisted of an almost semi-circular portico; Polished Tuscan order columns; the sandstone head of Caxton, which had originally adorned the keystone of the entrance arch of the 1856 building was incorporated into the second floor window heads above the entrance. The curved junction of the Pitt and O'Connell Street facades was surmounted by an ornate circular tower, raising three storeys above roof level, topped by a copper clad dome and lantern with flagpole.

A central light court was incorporated within the base of the triangular site resulting in a distinct, narr-v-shape plan arrangement. The court provided natural light and ventilation for the full height of the interior of the building down to the basement lettable offices. The walls were plain cement rendered, with steel framed windows at each floor.

Changes over time to the buildings exterior:

- 1928 – New Roof outdoor gymnasium enclosed by chain wire fence with new dressing room at Pitt Street South.
- 1934 – new The Sydney Morning Herald Art Gallery on fourth floor consisted of gallery, entrance vestibule and annex, reception room. Designed by architect J.L. Stephen Mansfield ARIBA. The Art gallery was later relocated with new entrance and Wunderlich awning at Pitt Street.
- 1930 – New Loading Dock at Pitt Street north.
- 1941 – Wartime office accommodation for the ministry of munitions on roof beneath awning roof.
- 1946 – New kitchen and dining room in earlier office accommodation on roof.
- 1946 – Loading dock on O'Connell Street formed by enlargement of window in end projecting bay.
- 1950 – New stair at O'Connell Street entrance.
- 1951 – Second opening to sub basement, northern end of Pitt Street, facade. Existing awning extended one bay over new opening.

Original Interior

Building designed to provide space for publishing operations of John Fairfax and Sons plus considerable leasing space for tenants.

Fairfax Space included the sub basement and ground floor facing Pitt and O'Connell Streets; entire first, second and third floors; part of O'Connell Street frontage (fourth - ninth floors); public entrance at Hunter Street corner with two lifts to serving administrative floors; one lift from sub-basement to third floor, the other from sub-basement to second floor; staff entrance at O'Connell Street, two cart docks adjacent to staff entrance; two goods lifts behind serving all floors. Two main full height stairs provided on O'Connell Street, served Fairfax operations, the other adjacent to Pitt Street entrance serviced the leased offices.

Minimal interior design remains; descriptions of the above were obtained from contemporary drawings, photographs, written descriptions and extant remnants. They show considerable effort was expanded to create interiors which expressed the modernity prosperity and optimism of "John Fairfax and Sons". The greatest effort centred on the basement, ground and first floor public areas, and to a lesser extent throughout the remainder floors. The interiors were treated in a conservative manner typical of similar offices of the period. The materials consisted of "solid" and "traditional" marble, timber and terrazzo flooring; marble and ceramic tiled walling, decorated plaster ceilings, polished timber joinery and brass fittings.

The Sydney Morning Herald articles describe the most memorable interior features which include "a mounting curved step of the portico – its suspended trachyte ceiling (only one in Sydney), pendant lamps, antique in style-it hangs like a regal canopy". 'The marble decorations containing rich veins of copper and purple splashed vividly through the main substance of creamy limestone, typifying the beauty of our native marbles. The grand central staircase of marble, banistered with wrought metal, at the midway landing where the stairs divide and rise in two wings' (date unknown).

Changes to the Interior over time:

- 1934 – Fourth floor – opening of The Sydney Morning Herald Art Gallery.
- 1934 – New offices for Ure Smith's "Art in Australia" magazine on seventh floor, after purchasing the publication.
- 1934 – Former school room on first floor converted to offices.
- 1934 – Subdivision of ground and first floor, set back of ground floor counters - increased public spaces.
- 1936 – First floor partition alterations.
- 1936 – Ground, first, second, third floor extensions into light court.
- 1937 – Basement relocation of Art Gallery to Pitt Street Entrance.
- 1941 – Roof construction of wartime spaces.
- 1944 – Excavation of sandstone ten metres (three new levels) below sub-basement along north wall for printing presses and reels.
- 1946 – Roof Kitchen and dining area provided.

=== Bank of New South Wales phase ===
External renovations included major changes for the Bank of New South Wales, branch usage to incorporate in the basement: Savings Bank; Chambers, offices, safe deposit and Trading Bank strong rooms; access to new vestibule at Pitt Street entrance. Ground floor: new Trading Bank chamber; Travel Department and offices.

- 1956 – New entrance to O'Connell Street.
- 1957 – New entrance to Pitt Street north to basement car park.
- 1959 – Art Gallery awning cut back and lanterns removed.
- 1968 – Major repairs to sandstone cladding by Loveridge & Hudson (re-pointing, cornice and parapet stone replacement).
- 1955–1960 – Partition alterations to most floors.
- 1956 – Goods lifts at O'Connell Street replaced.
- 1956 – Car park formed in sub-basement
- 1956 – Bank of New South Wales ("The Wales" bank) occupying two floors - basement and ground
- 1961 – Offices and false ceilings at first floor.
- 1964 – Computer installation ninth floor.
- 1965 – Air conditioning installation with window mounted fan coil units.
- 1966 – Computer installation eighth floor with new roof mounted air conditioning plant.
- 1967 – Computer installed seventh and eighth floors.
- 1968 – Major refurbishing to most levels.
- 1981 – Health centre on tenth floor.
- 1984 – Reinstatement of first floor board room after subdivision of previous refurbishments.

=== Radisson Hotels phase ===
The Radisson Blu Plaza Hotel addresses O'Connell Street.

== Heritage listing ==
As at 20 May 2009, the site of the building has a 99-year association from 1856 to 1955 with the publication of Australia's oldest surviving newspaper, The Sydney Morning Herald. The building itself was designed for this purpose which it fulfilled for 28 years from 1927 to 1955. The building, with its rounded corner treatment on the prominent narrow-vee site provides a good and clearly visible element in the townscape. The building is a large and powerful reminder both of the success and prosperity of the publisher-owners, John Fairfax & Sons, and of the dominant role of newspapers in society at that time, before the advent of the electronic media. The exterior treatment of the building is a fine example, in good condition, of the Interwar Commercial Renaissance Palazzo style, then popular for office buildings of this type. It reflects an image consistent with the perceived role of The Sydney Morning Herald - conservative, substantial, influential and responsible.

The only substantial and clearly visible surviving remnants of the original office layout are the Manager's Room with its adjacent Elevator Vestibule, portion of the adjoining Assistant Manager's Room, and the Board Room, all on the First Floor. Though now mostly incomplete, they serve as reminders of the quality of original finishes employed for these most important rooms. They are notable for their conservative and solid design and the emphasis placed on usage of Australian joinery timbers.

Wales House was listed on the New South Wales State Heritage Register on 2 April 1999.

== See also ==
- Australian non-residential architectural styles
