= The Sydney Club =

Heritage-listed building in Sydney, Australia

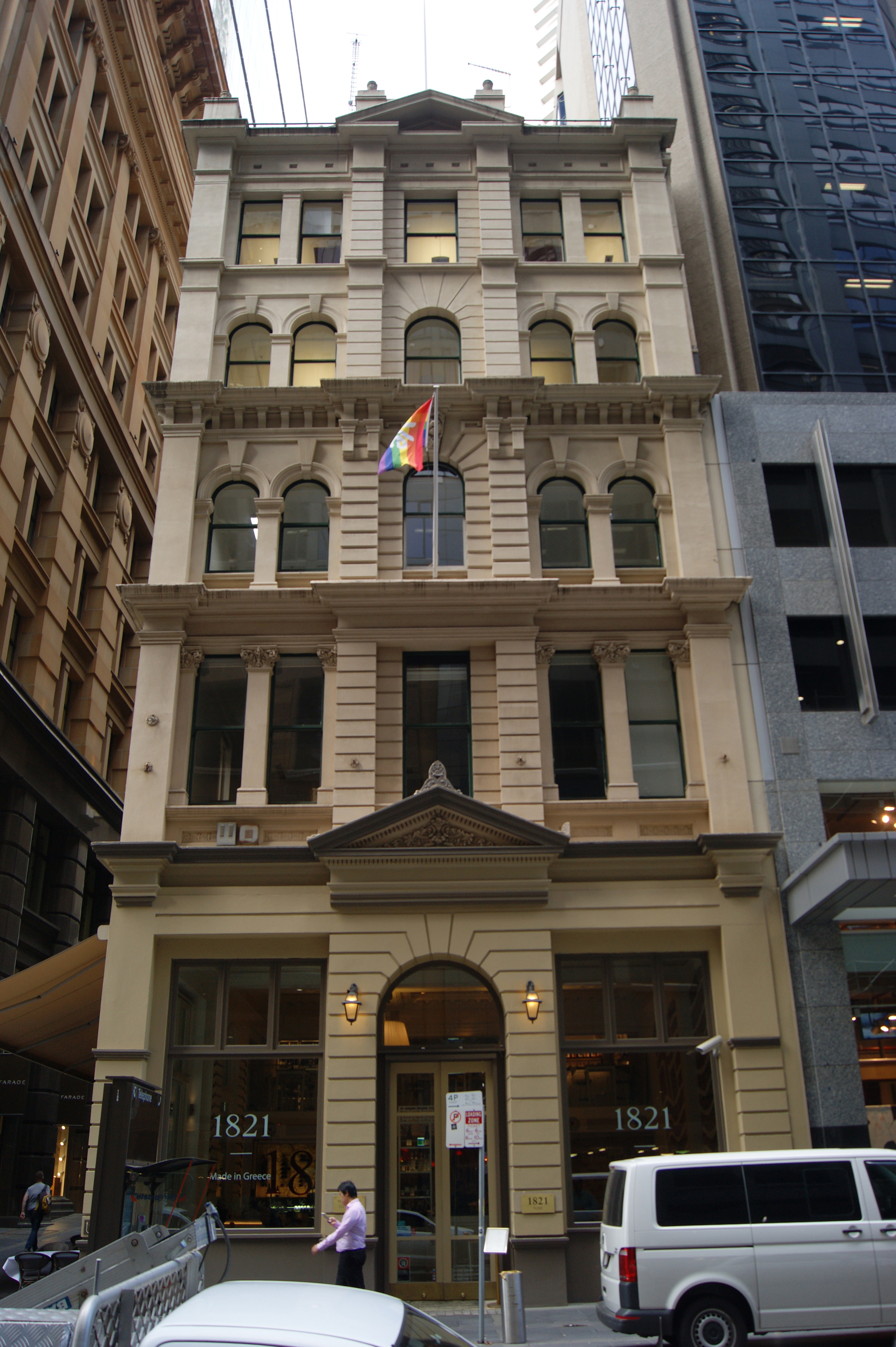
- Façade

- Location within Sydney Location within Australia
- 33.8683°S 151.2086°E
- Location: 122 Pitt Street, Sydney central business district, City of Sydney, New South Wales, Australia

History
- Built: 1886–1887

Site notes
- Architect: Mansfield Brothers
- Architectural style: Victorian Mannerist

New South Wales Heritage Register
- Official name: Sydney Club; The Sydney Club; Million House
- Type: State heritage (built)
- Designated: 2 April 1999
- Reference no.: 583
- Type: Bank
- Category: Commercial
- Builders: A & A Scott

The Sydney Club is a heritage-listed club premises at 122 Pitt Street, in the Sydney central business district, in the City of Sydney local government area of New South Wales, Australia. It was designed by Mansfield Brothers and built from 1886 to 1887 by A & A Scott. It is also known as Million House. It was added to the New South Wales State Heritage Register on 2 April 1999.

== History ==
Pitt Street is the oldest named street in Australia. It was named since the first days of settlement and thought to be named after the British Prime Minister, William Pitt Scott. The original Crown Grant of the present site of 122 Pitt Street was given to Joseph Wyatt by the Major General Sir Richard Bourke on 4 May 1836. The Sands Directory record that the site was originally numbered 162 & 164 Pitt Street. The site was occupied during 1858-1870 by John Glue who ran a labour bazaar and restaurant, and later a grocery store and in 1870 his business was called the "Kent Larder". From 1871 to 1885 the City Bank Hotel was located on this site.

The Commercial Bank of Australia negotiated the purchase of the leasehold of the City Bank Hotel in 1884. The following year plans were prepared by the local architects the Mansfield Brothers. After a report by a property developer James Mason the directors approved £12,299 for its construction. The new bank premises consisted of a spacious basement storey, ground, first and second floors. The portions facing Pitt and Rowe Streets were constructed of the best Pyrmont Stone of a light cream colour, wrought and polished. All other external and internal walls were built in massive brickwork. The building was completed and occupied from early 1887. The whole of ground and basement floor was used as business premises of the bank. The upper floor were leased to a firm of solicitors and various other organisations.

The Royal Bank purchased the property in 1918 from Robert Fitzgerald Evans and the Perpetual Trustee Company for £40,500. In 1919 the building was renovated and modernised, including major refitting to the ground floor banking chamber and the installation of a lift. The alteration was designed and supervised by a local architect J. Burcham Clamp. On 31 March 1927, the English, Scottish & Australia Bank acquired all the assets of the Royal Bank of Australia.

The premises of 122 Pitt Street were placed on the market and the Millions Club of NSW purchased the property on 24 August 1927 for £65,000. The Millions Club was formed in 1912 by prominent businessman to foster immigration in Australia. The Club used a model established in America where prominent men in the cities of half a million or more formed local associations to boost the city's population to a million. Before World War I the Club focused on good roads and housing. The outbreak of war hindered their immigration aspirations, but the Club raised funds for the Red Cross. During the inter-war peace the Club was involved in activities that helped migrants to settle in Australia, but were also involved in State Irrigation Schemes, building branch railway lines to remote parts of the state, the establishment of an Influenza Administration Committee and the NSW State Orchestra. After World War II the government took greater control over immigration, lessening the Club's ability to contribute. From 1954 they ran a very informative migration and settlement summary each month in their magazine "Millions" aimed at easing the problems faced by migrants.

After the building's purchase, architectural firm Morrow and Gordon was commissioned by the Club to prepare the plans to convert the ground floor into shops to generate revenue. The decision to proceed with the addition of the third and fourth floor was made in November 1928 and was again done by Morrow and Gordon Architects. The official opening of the "Millions Club of NSW" took place on 11 March by His Excellency Sir Dudley de Chair, the State Governor, who was the Club's patron.

The name Millions Club was no longer appropriate as it once had been, so it was changed to The Sydney Club in 1963. The Royal Prince Alfred Yacht Club joined with The Sydney Club in 1972 after the Yacht Club's premises were purchased by the MLC redevelopment. Work on the mezzanine level was done to provide yachting members with their own clubroom and an office for the Commodore. The Club is now involved in activities such as resistance to further encroachment on Sydney Harbour by Naval installations at Garden Island and the preservation of Queen Victoria Building. They have also increased their support for charitable causes, particularly those directly involved in the care of the people in the City of Sydney.

== Description ==
The Sydney Club is a five-storey masonry building located in the corner of Pitt and Rowe Streets in the central business district of Sydney. The original building was designed by George Allen Mansfield in 1886, in the Victorian Mannerist style. In 1929 the upper two levels were added by Morrow and Gorden in a sympathetic style. A mezzanine floor has been inserted between the original ground and first floor levels to create seven shops on the ground level and a showroom at the mezzanine level.

The building is constructed of load-bearing masonry walls with some internal timber and steel structural elements. The west and north elevation exhibit a stylish hierarchy of columns and window treatments. The street level facades have been compromised by the introduction of recent shop frontage. The floor is timber and has carpet over it. The roof is flat with a series of plant and service rooms located over the eastern section. The roof is surrounded by parapet walls. Box gutters are located along the north and south walls. An awning has been added to the building in 1929. Although some original fabric at the basement and ground floor level has been lost as a result of alterations, elements of the main construction phases are evident throughout the building. The building exhibits high level of decoration such as cornices, attached columns, string courses and imitation stone courses.

=== Modifications and dates ===
- 1919 – renovated and "modernised". Lift added.
- 1927 – ground floor converted to shops.
- 1928 – third and fourth storeys added.

== Heritage listing ==
As at 9 August 2004, The Sydney Club & Millions House, formerly the Commercial Bank, is a five-storey building comprising a lower three storeys of Victorian Mannerist style which has been sensitively extended. Its proximity to the financial centre of Martin Place and as an adaptation of a former nineteenth century banking premises, this building is historically significant for its demonstration of the role played by clubs like the Millions Club in the political power-broking of the city. The building is aesthetically significant for its well resolved detailing to both its interior and exterior, and is particularly noted for its use of rusticated panels and decorative voussoirs as well as its granite columned entry. The building is significant for its contribution as a landmark building to the Pitt Street streetscape and as an example of club facilities within the City of Sydney. The building is socially significant for the longevity of its occupation by the Millions Club, now The Sydney Club, and for its ability to evoke through its Rowe Street club entrance and coffee shop the former character of this lane.

The Sydney Club was listed on the New South Wales State Heritage Register on 2 April 1999 having satisfied the following criteria.

The place is important in demonstrating the course, or pattern, of cultural or natural history in New South Wales.

The Sydney Club is representative of Late Victorian commercial development in central Sydney. In its adaptation as a former nineteenth century banking premises and its proximity to the financial centre of Martin Place, it is a physical reminder of development of Sydney as a commercial centre.

The place has a strong or special association with a person, or group of persons, of importance of cultural or natural history of New South Wales's history.

The Sydney Club is of State significance as the headquarters of the influential Sydney Club, formerly the Million Club. The Club was formed to increase immigration to Sydney, but took an active role in advancing New South Wales through many different avenues, including irrigation schemes, roads and railways. The Club had many prominent members, including Percy Hunter, Sir Walter Edward Davidson, Governor of NSW, Sir Arthur Rickard, Sir Joseph Carruthers, a state governor and Dr John Charles Wright, the Anglican Archbishop of Sydney.

The place is important in demonstrating aesthetic characteristics and/or a high degree of creative or technical achievement in New South Wales.

The Sydney Club is of State significance as a fine example of the Victorian Mannerist architectural style, as applied to a commercial building. The lower floors display a high standard of architectural decoration, despite unsympathetic alterations to the street level. The 1929 addition of the third and fourth storeys was in keeping with the architectural style of the building. The Sydney Club has local significance as a landmark at the corner of Pitt ad Rowe Streets and is a key visual element linking a group of Victorian buildings at the intersection of King and Pitt Streets to the General Post Office, Sydney at the corner of Martin Place.

The place has a strong or special association with a particular community or cultural group in New South Wales for social, cultural or spiritual reasons.

The Sydney Club is of State significance to the many immigrants aided by the Millions Club and Sydney Club through their services to the newly arrived. The Club provided information and facilities to immigrants to help them settle into life in Australia. The Sydney Club is of local significance as the headquarters for the Sydney Yacht Club.
