= Little Hunter and Hamilton Street Precinct =

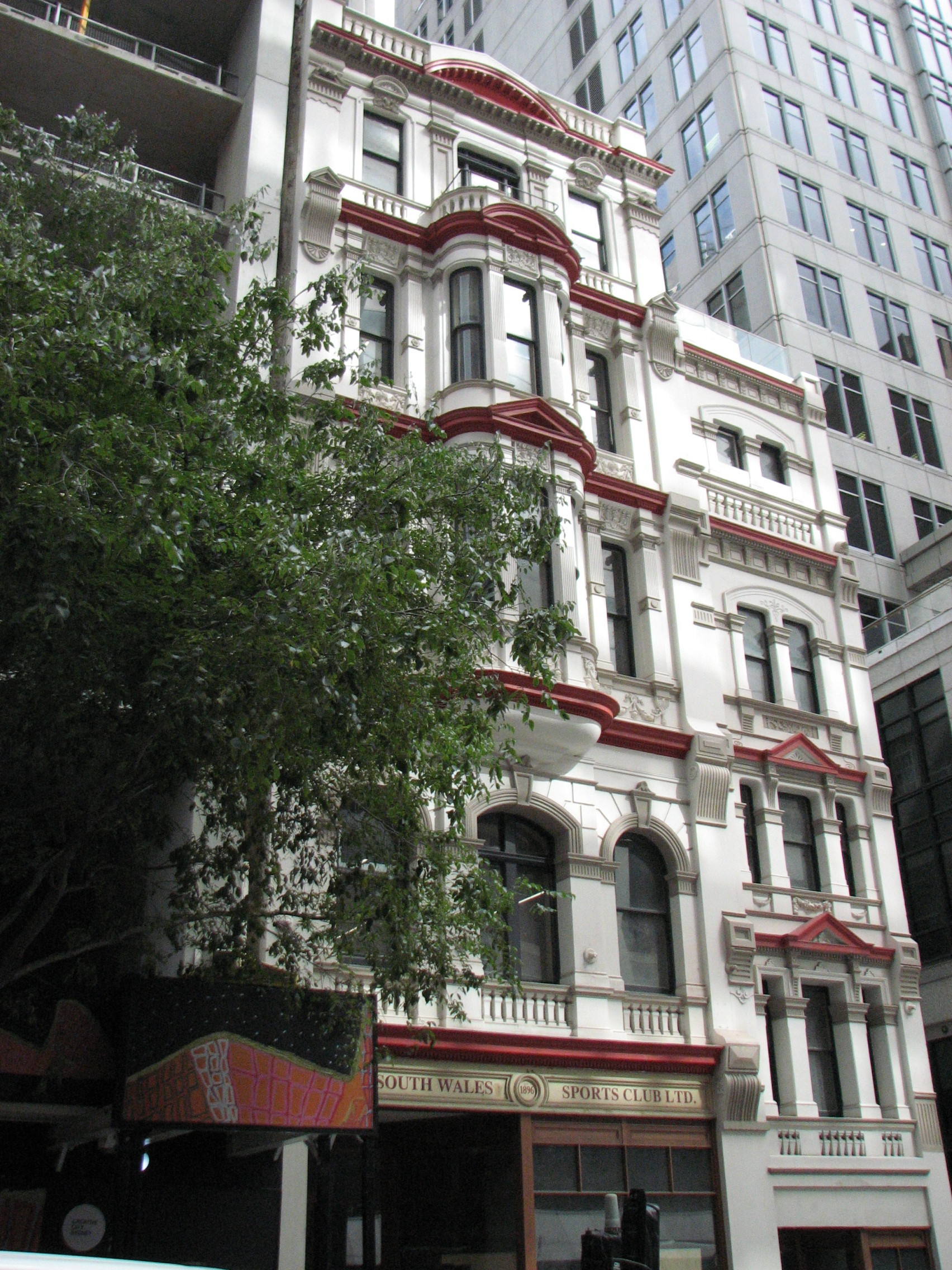
- NSW Sports Club building

- Location within Sydney Location within Australia
- 33.8654°S 151.2080°E
- Location: Little Hunter Street (between Hunter Street and Curtin Place), Sydney central business district, City of Sydney, New South Wales, Australia

New South Wales Heritage Register
- Official name: Little Hunter and Hamilton Street Precinct; The Grand Hotel; NSW Sports Club
- Type: State heritage (complex / group)
- Designated: 2 April 1999
- Reference no.: 599
- Type: Commercial Office/Building
- Category: Commercial

10 Hunter Street is a commercial building located at the corner of Hunter Street and Little Hunter Street, in the Sydney central business district, New South Wales, Australia. It was formerly The Grand Hotel (since relocated further east on Hunter Street) and NSW Sports Club (which closed in 2013). The property is privately owned. The building was added to the New South Wales State Heritage Register on 2 April 1999 under the name Little Hunter and Hamilton Street Precinct. The heritage listed portion of the property includes the main building of 10 Hunter Street, extending to the rear frontage on Curtin Street, as well as the extension facing Little Hunter Street.

== Heritage listing ==
The Little Hunter and Hamilton Street Precinct was listed on the New South Wales State Heritage Register on 2 April 1999.
