= Rowe Street, Sydney =

Street in Sydney, Australia

Coordinates: 33.8682°S 151.2084°E

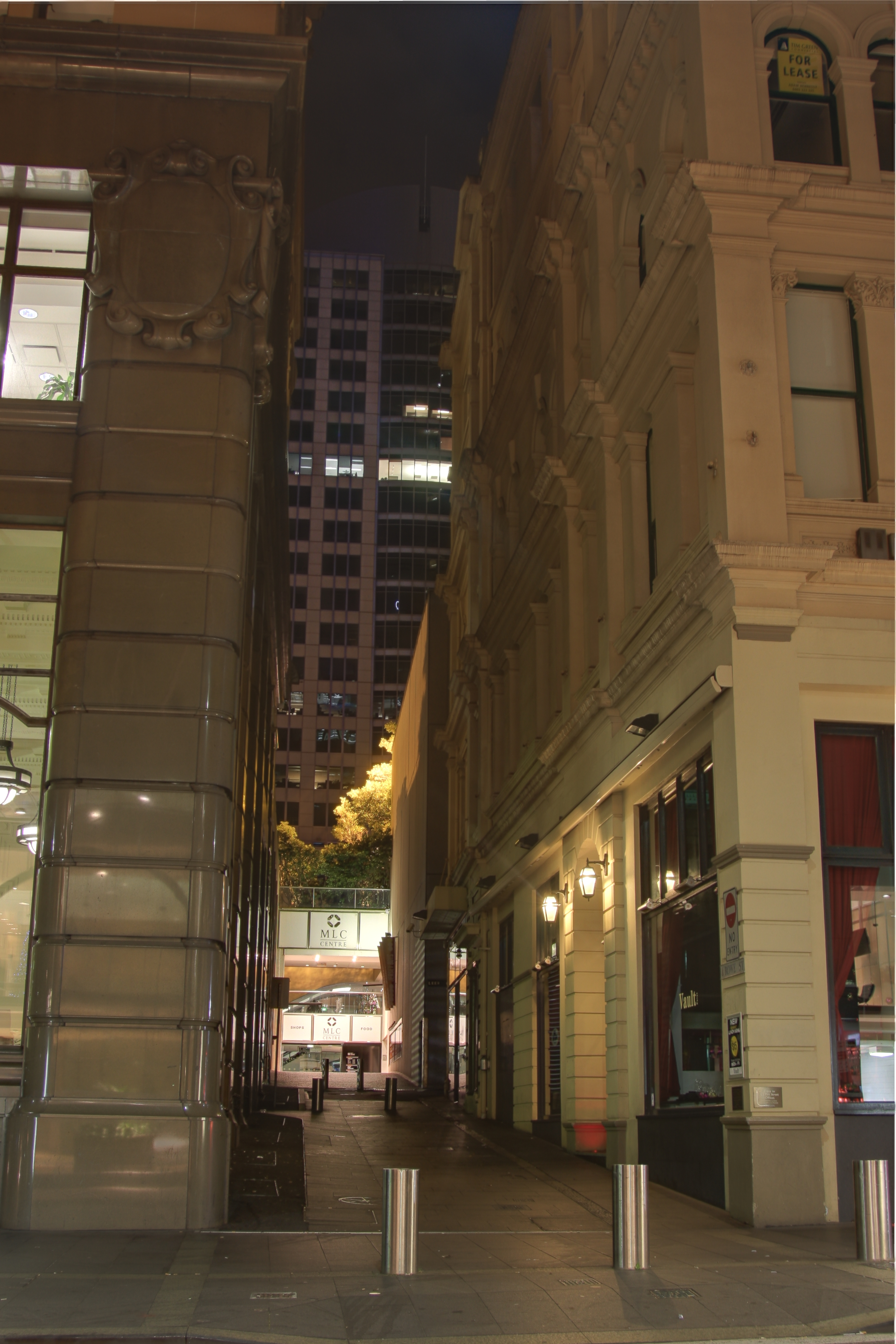
The remaining part of Rowe Street, Sydney

Rowe Street is a narrow laneway in the central business district of Sydney in New South Wales, Australia. Originally running between Castlereagh Street and Pitt Street, what remains is now just a short lane running east–west off Pitt Street.

== History ==
Rowe Street was named in honour of Thomas Rowe (1829–1899), a prominent architect in the colony of New South Wales. Originally, Rowe Street ran between Castlereagh Street and Pitt Street, parallel to Martin Place.

The street was a centre for Sydney's bohemian life from the late 19th century until the 1970s, described in 1931 as "the primrose path of dalliance". It may have been the birthplace of Sydney's famous push movement. The precinct included the original Theatre Royal, the Playbox Theatre, art studios and galleries, restaurants, cafés and coffee shops, many well-known fashion, clothing, interior design, and jewellery shops. Rowe Street Records was one of the first specialist import record stores in Australia.

In 1956 Mervyn Horton, the gay editor, art collector, and philanthropist opened Galleria Espresso, an espresso bar and art gallery at 27 Rowe Street.

Most of the Rowe Street precinct, including the palatial Hotel Australia, was demolished in the early 1970s to make way for the MLC Centre, a monolithic modernist edifice designed by Sydney architect Harry Seidler.

== Description ==
Today, Rowe Street runs east–west off Pitt Street. The only remaining building from the 19th century is The Sydney Club on the corner of Pitt and Rowe Streets (previously known as the Millions Club).

== See also ==
- History of Sydney
