= Pitt Street =

Street in Sydney, Australia

Pitt Street, Sydney New South Wales
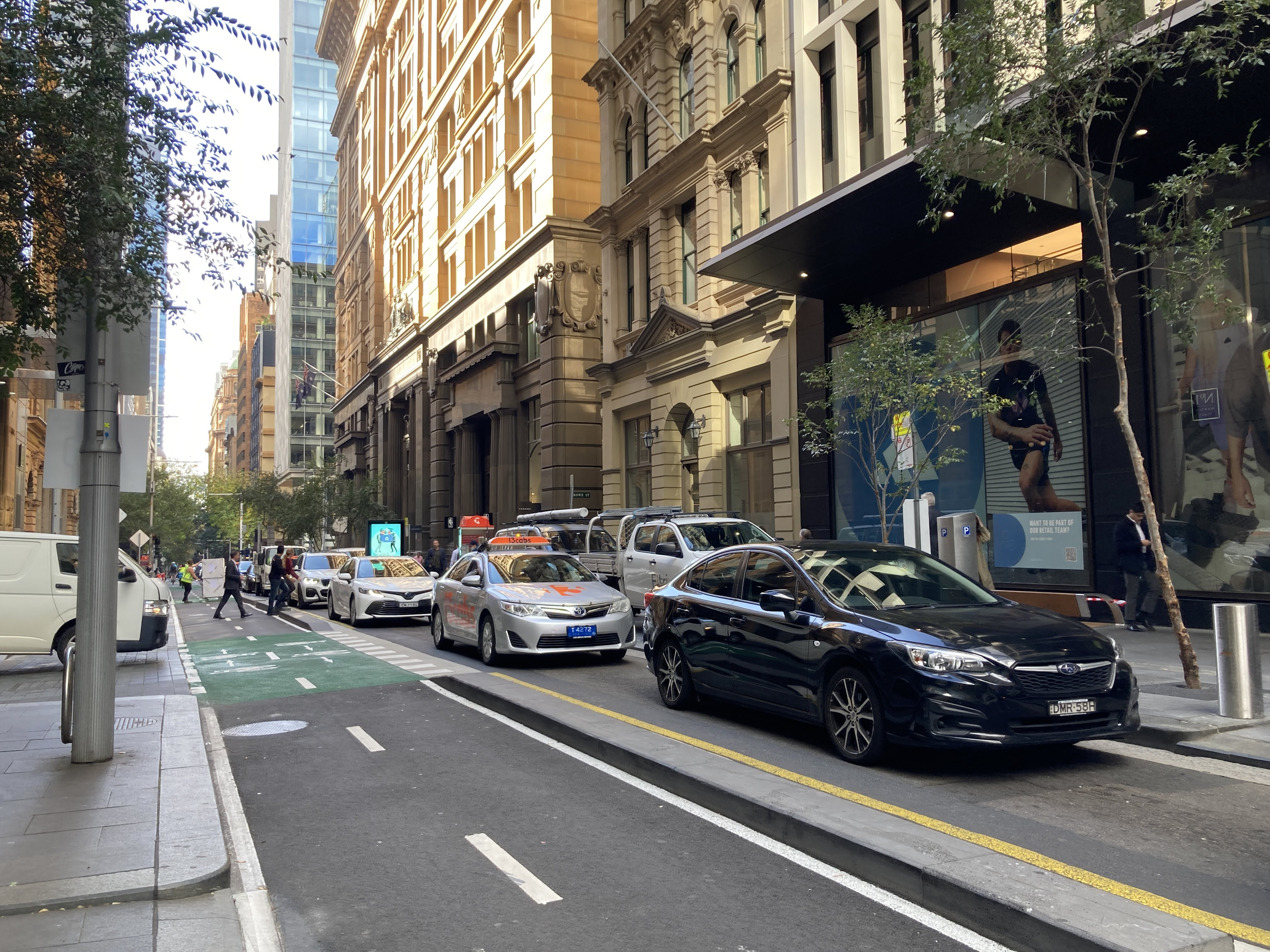
- Pitt Street, looking north
- Coordinates: 33.861375°S 151.209243°E (Northern end); 33.882842°S 151.204197°E (Southern end)

General information
- Type: Street
- Length: 2.5 km (1.6 mi)

Major junctions
- Northern end: Alfred Street; Sydney CBD
- Bridge Street; Hunter Street; Martin Place; King Street; Market Street; Park Street; Bathurst Street; Liverpool Street; Goulburn Street; Hay Street; Eddy Avenue
- Southern end: George Street; Haymarket, Sydney

Location(s)
- LGA(s): City of Sydney
- Major suburbs: Sydney CBD, Haymarket

Pitt Street is a major street in the Sydney central business district in New South Wales, Australia. The street runs through the entire city centre from Circular Quay in the north to Waterloo, although today's street is in two disjointed sections after a substantial stretch of it was removed to make way for Sydney's Central railway station. Pitt Street is well known for the pedestrian only retail centre of Pitt Street Mall, a section of the street which runs from King Street to Market Street.

Pitt Street is a one way (southbound only) from Circular Quay to Pitt Street Mall and (northbound only) from Pitt Street Mall to Goulburn Street, while Pitt Street Mall is for pedestrians only. It is dominated by retail and commercial office space.

== History ==
Pitt Street was originally named Pitt Row, and is one of the earliest named streets in Sydney. Pitt Street is believed to have been named by Governor Arthur Phillip in honour of William Pitt the Younger, at the time, the Prime Minister of Great Britain. In 1853, Pitt Street was extended north from Hunter Street to Circular Quay.

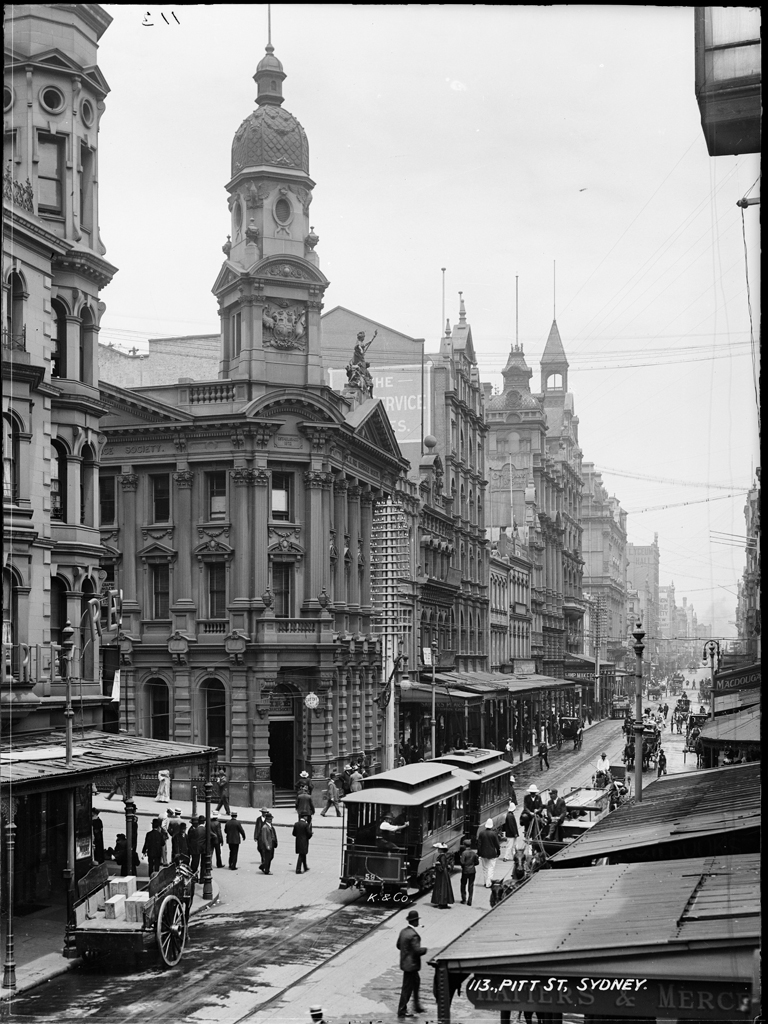
Pitt Street, c. 1900

Pitt Street was previously a one-way street in a southerly direction from Circular Quay to Campbell Street. In preparation for the construction of the Pitt Street Mall, in February 1987 the sections between Hunter Street and Martin Place, and Martin Place and King Street were converted to two-way cul de sacs to allow the Martin Place plaza to be extended. This was later reverted and today the Circular Quay to King Street section is one-way throughout in a southerly direction. From Goulburn Street to Park Street was converted to become one-way in a northerly direction. The Market Street to Park Street section initially remained as a southbound street, but was later converted to run northbound. The Goulburn Street to Campbell Street section was converted to two-way.

Five weeks after it opened, half of the original Pitt Street Mall length was closed as a pedestrian mall with vehicles reintroduced due to concerns of higher vehicle traffic on George Street. Vehicles were re-introduced between King Street and Hunter Street on March 28th 1987. The NRMA supported this as they believed it would relieve traffic congestion.

=== Tram line ===
The Circular Quay to Central station line was an important part of the Sydney tram network. It was an extremely busy service for passengers transferring from suburban trains, particularly prior to the opening of the City Circle underground railway line in 1926. Trams operated in a loop from Central station, running north along Pitt Street to Circular Quay returning south via Castlereagh Street. These tracks were also used by some eastern and south-western routes during busy periods. The line closed on 27 September 1957 with four tram services replaced with buses and three others diverted to operate via Elizabeth Street. The line made use of the sandstone viaduct onto the colonnade above Eddy Avenue at Central station, which since 1997 has formed part of the Inner West Light Rail.

=== Heritage-listed properties and notable buildings ===
The following properties, located on or adjacent to Pitt Street, are listed on various national, state, and/or local government heritage registers:

- Bulletin Place warehouses, on Bulletin Place, between Pitt Street and Macquarie Place
- Commonwealth Trading Bank Building
- Kings Hotel
- Pitt Street Uniting Church
- Soul Pattinson Building
- The Strand Arcade
- Sydney School of Arts building
- Former Sydney Water Head Office
- The Sydney Club
- Wales House, now part of the Radisson Blu hotel chain

Lincoln House, designed by noted Sydney architects Spain & Cosh in 1927, is at no. 280, and since around 2000 has been the home of the Sydney Mechanics' School of Arts.

== Pitt Street Cycleway ==
During the COVID-19 epidemic in 2020 the City of Sydney installed a "pop up" (or temporary) cycleway on Pitt Street. This cycleway was the busiest of all the pop up cycleways installed, with an average of 4430 weekly trips.

In March 2021 the city announced the cycleway would become permanent. It now connects to the King Street cycleway at the south end.

== Gallery ==
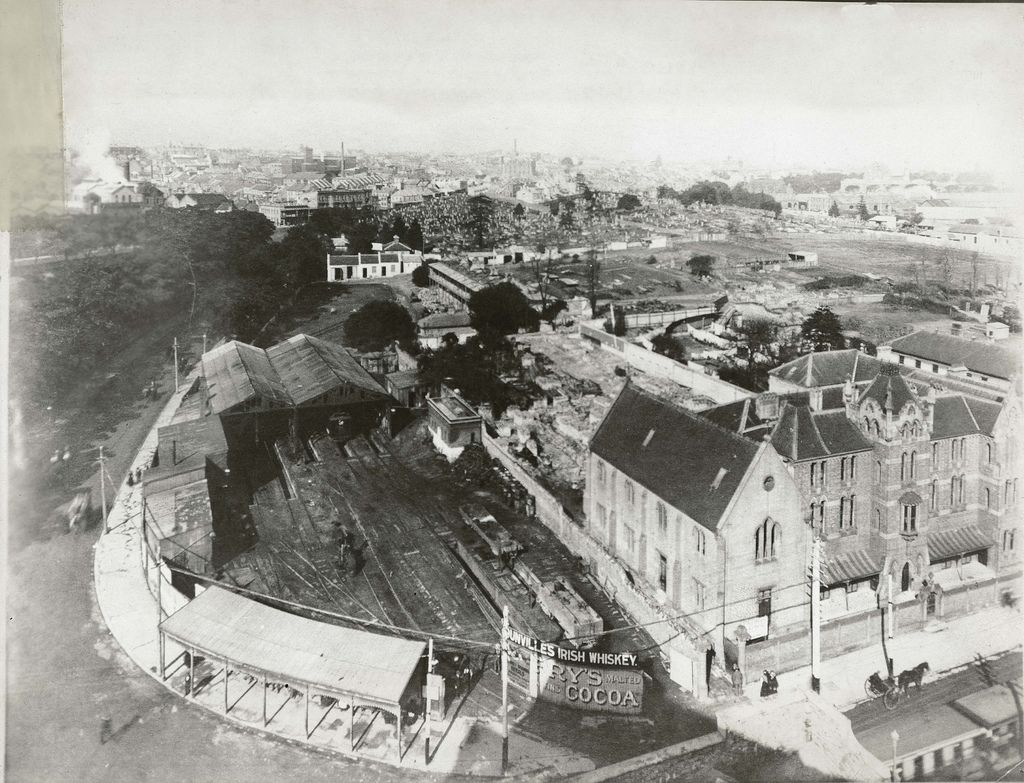
Sydney's first Tramways depot looking SE across the Old Cemeteries towards Surry Hills

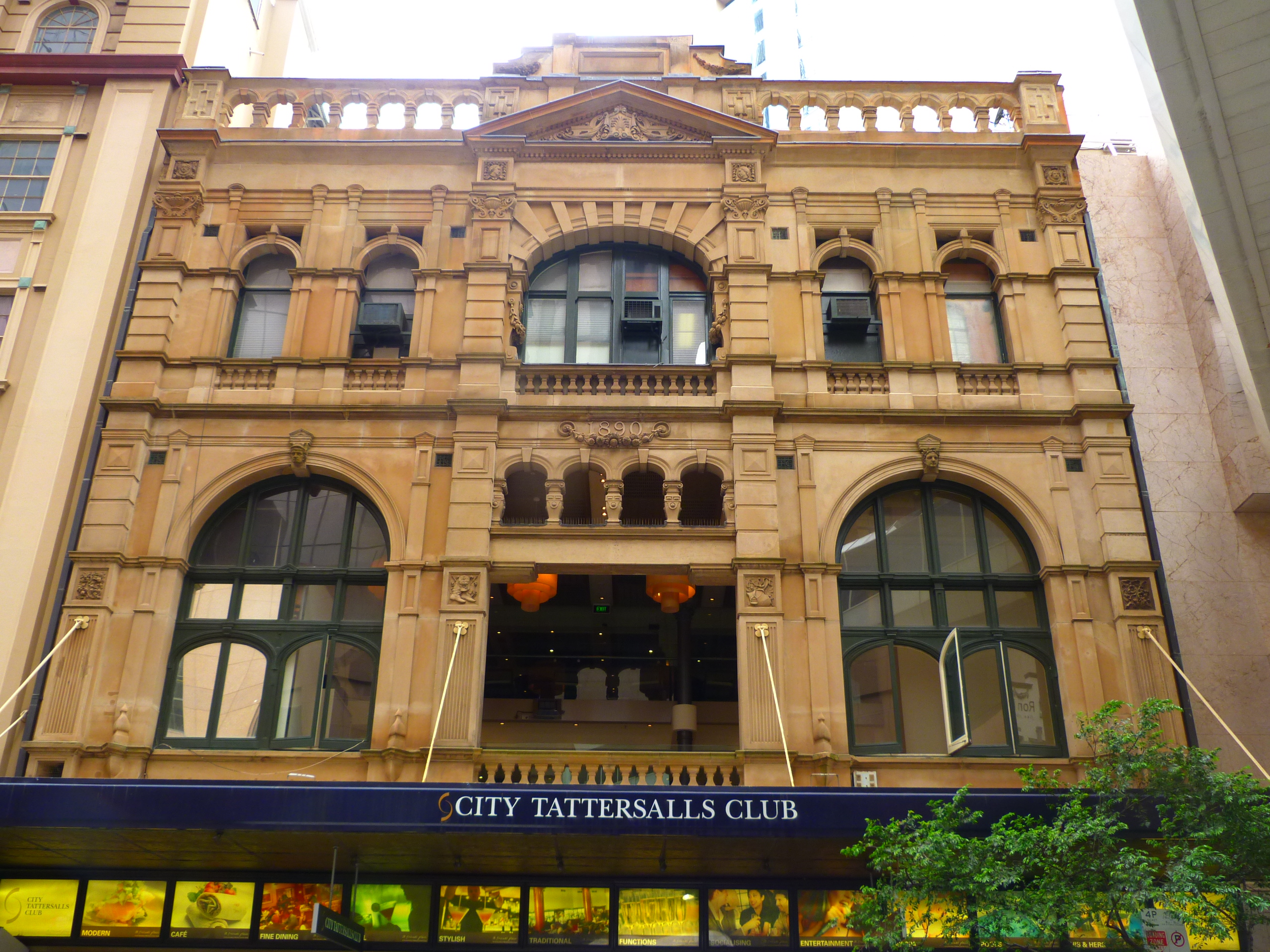
City Tattersalls Club

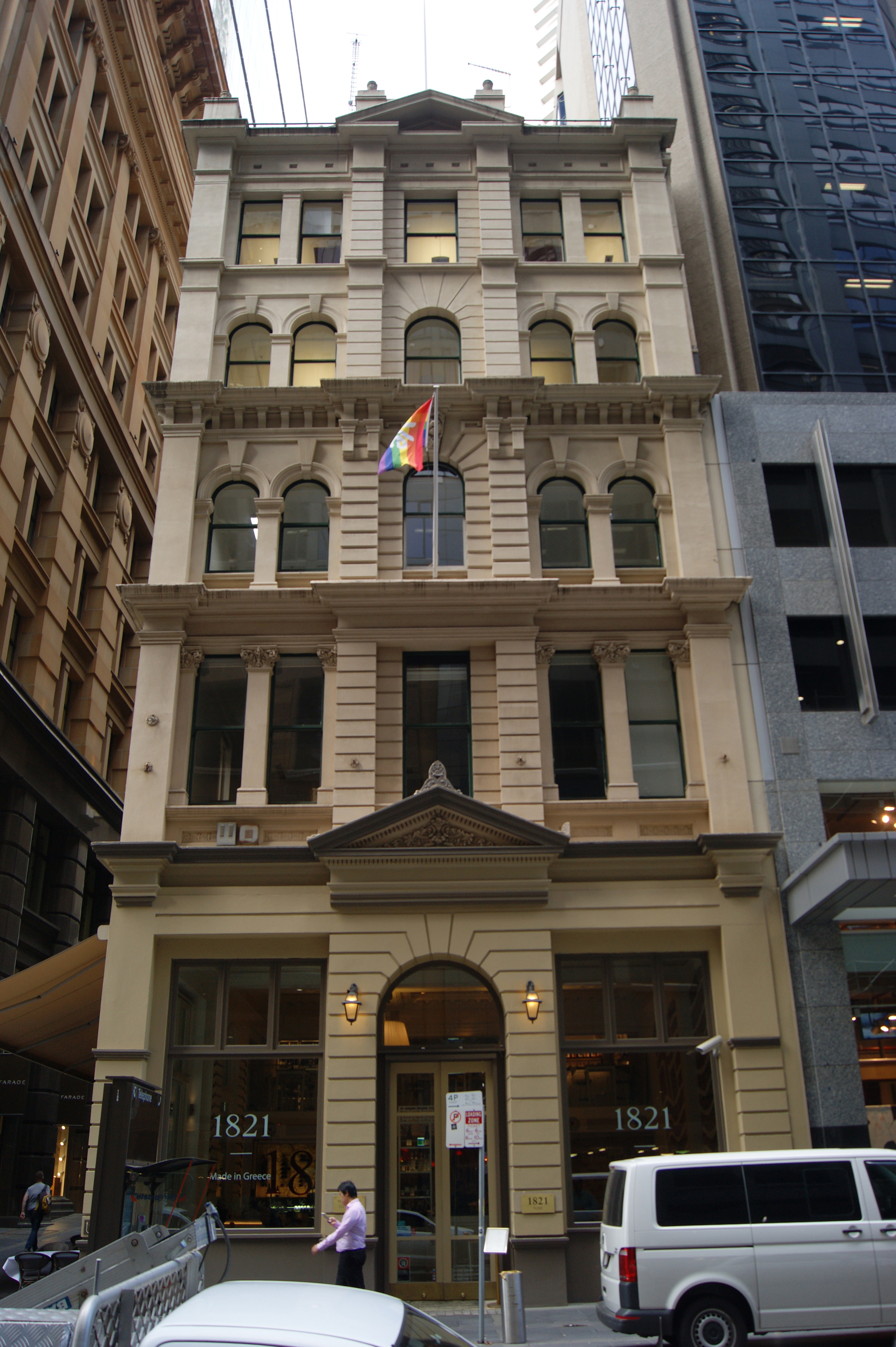
The Sydney Club

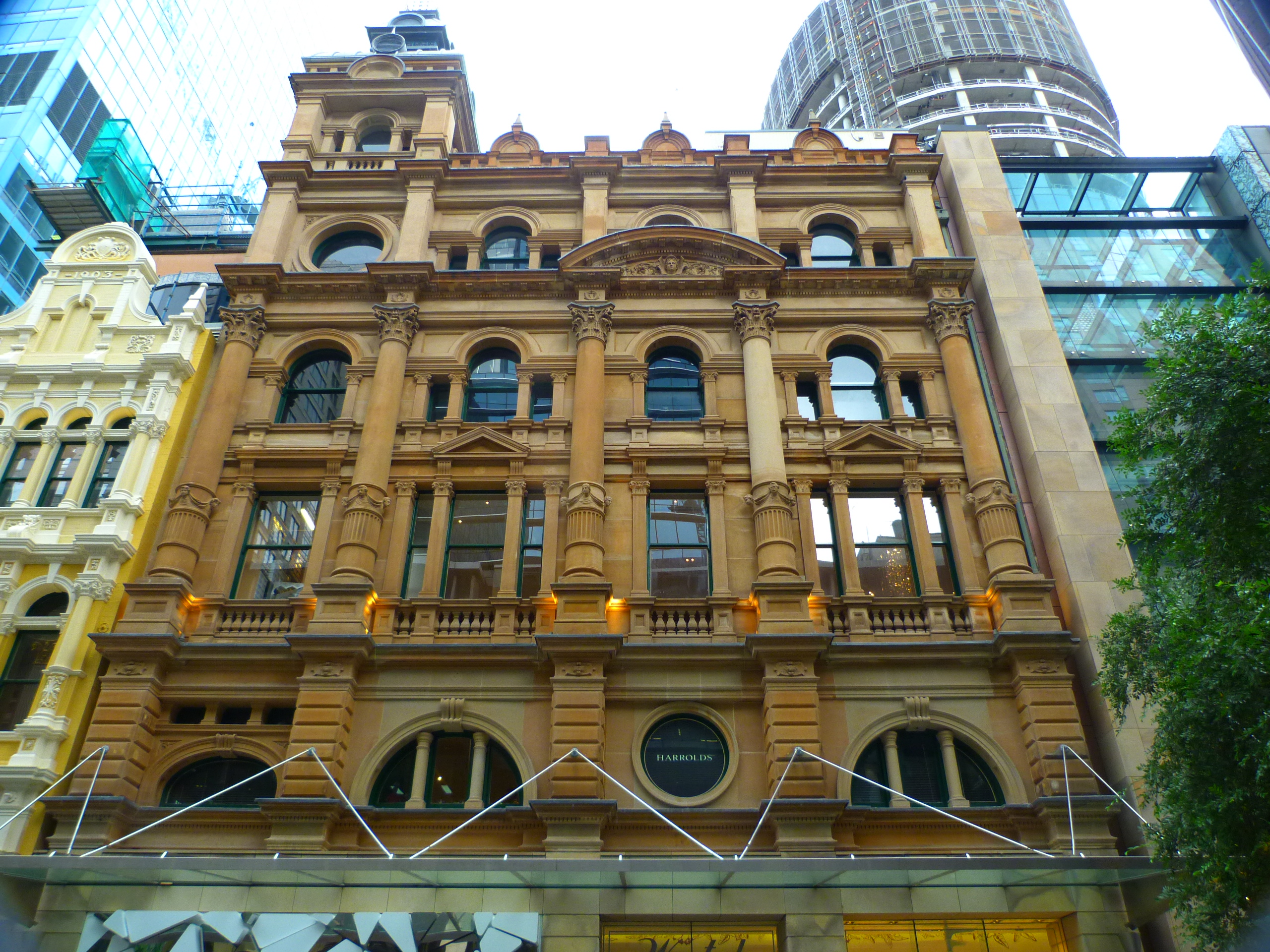
Building in Italianate style

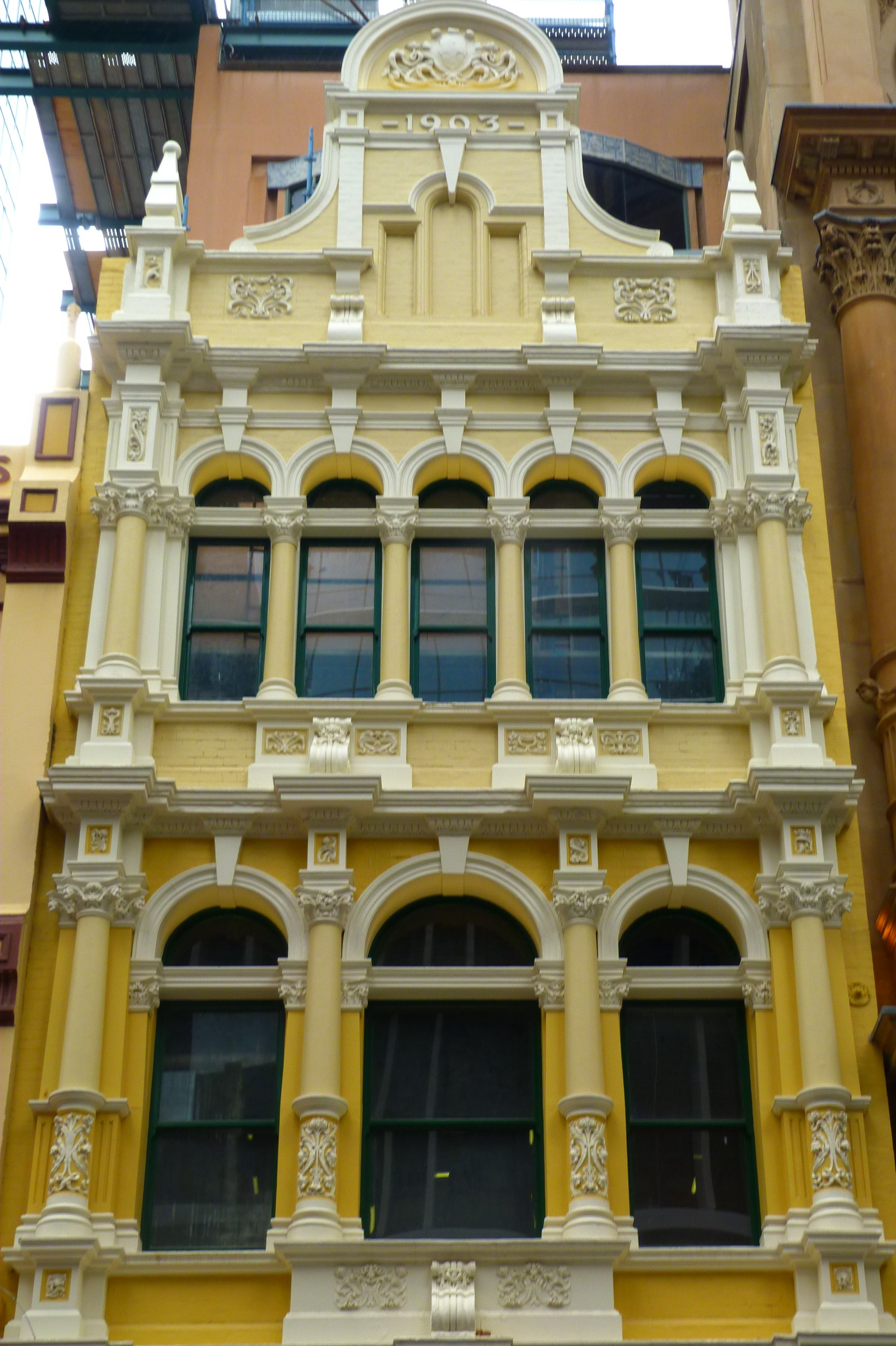
Restored 1903 building

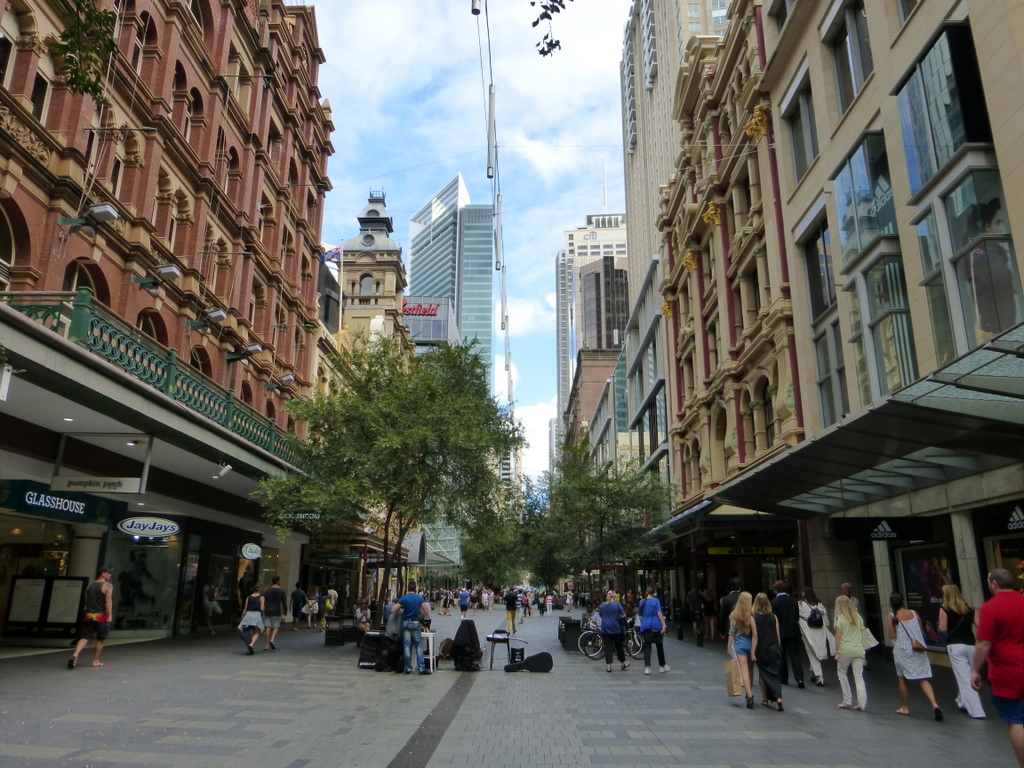
Pitt Street Mall from King Street looking south

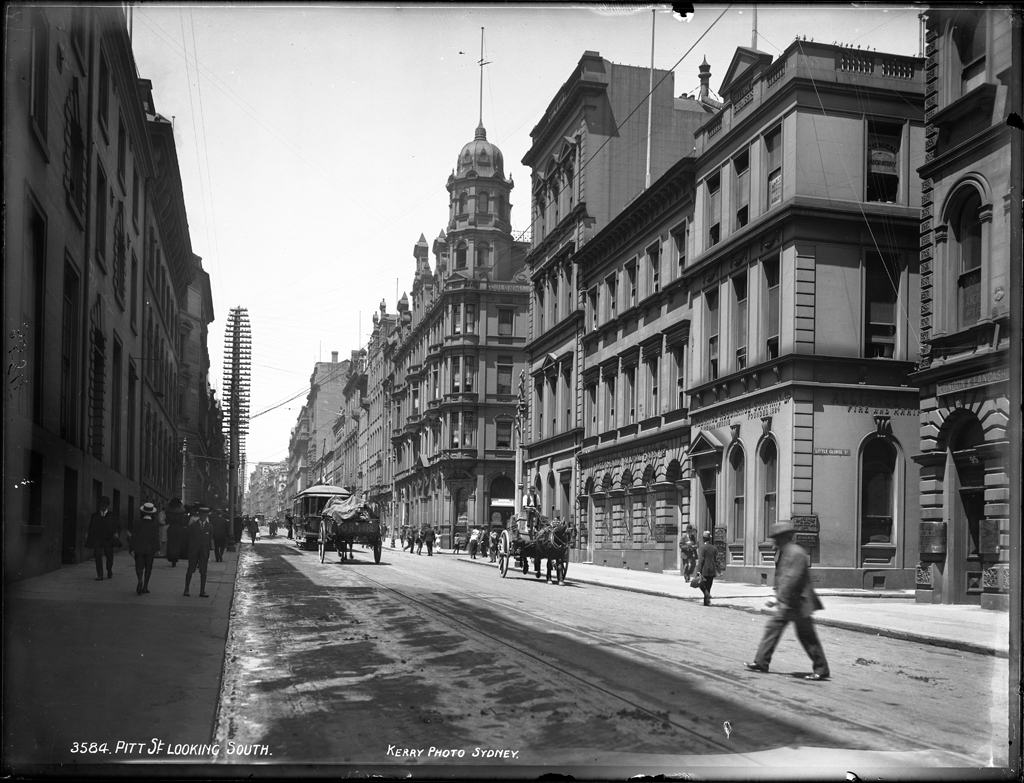
Looking south c. 1900

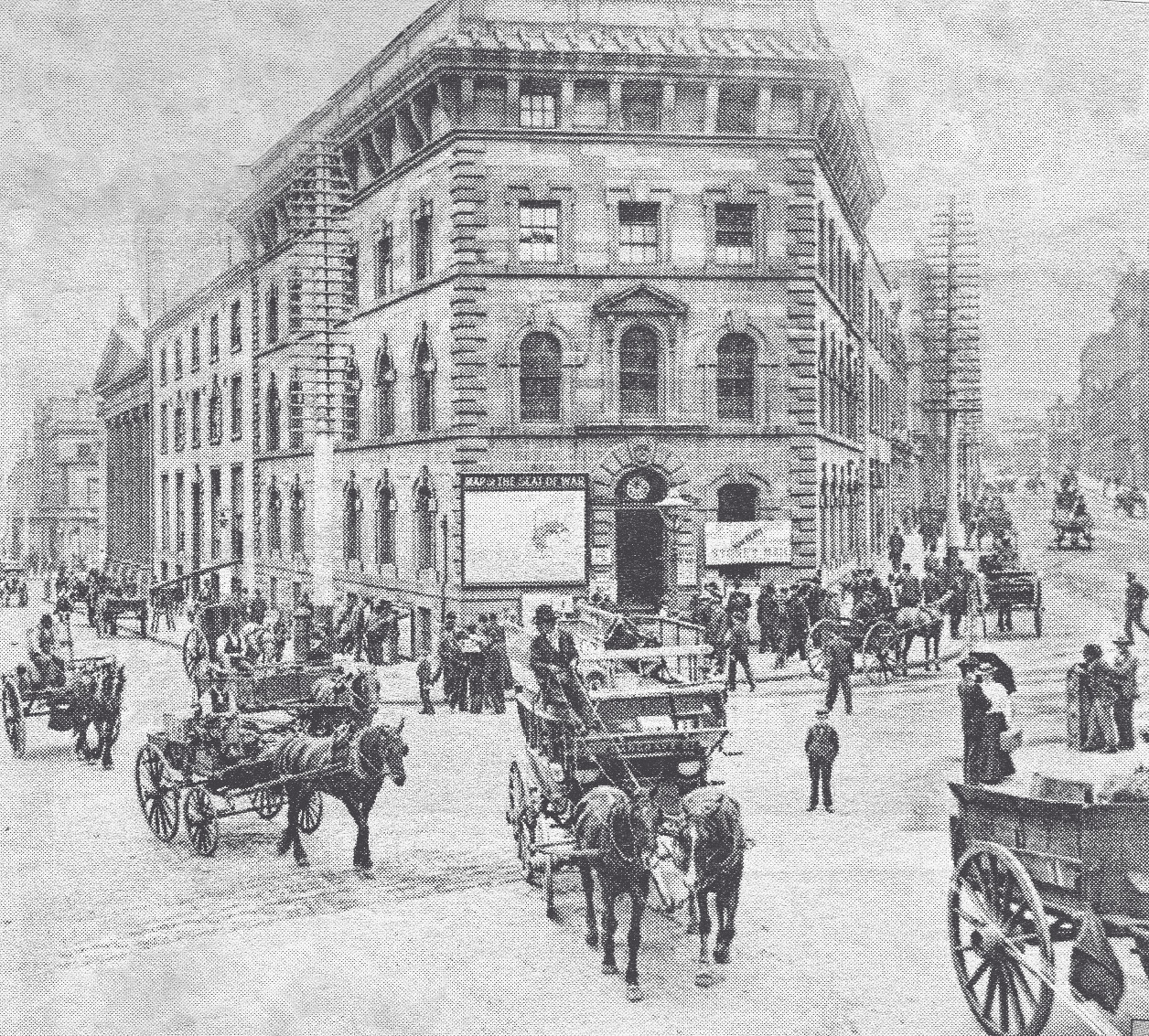
Archival image of Pitt and Hunter streets, showing Wales House

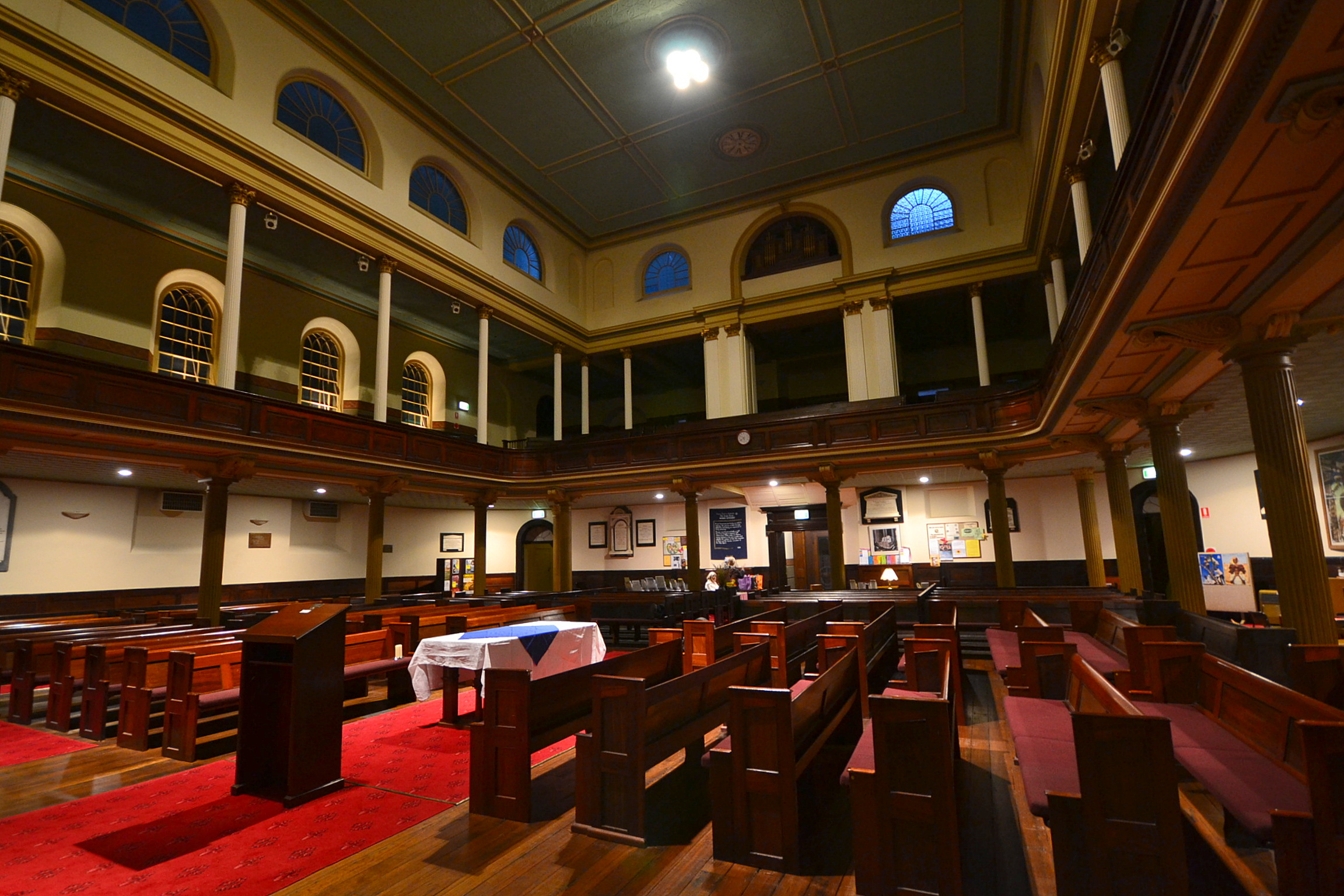
Pitt Street Uniting Church interior

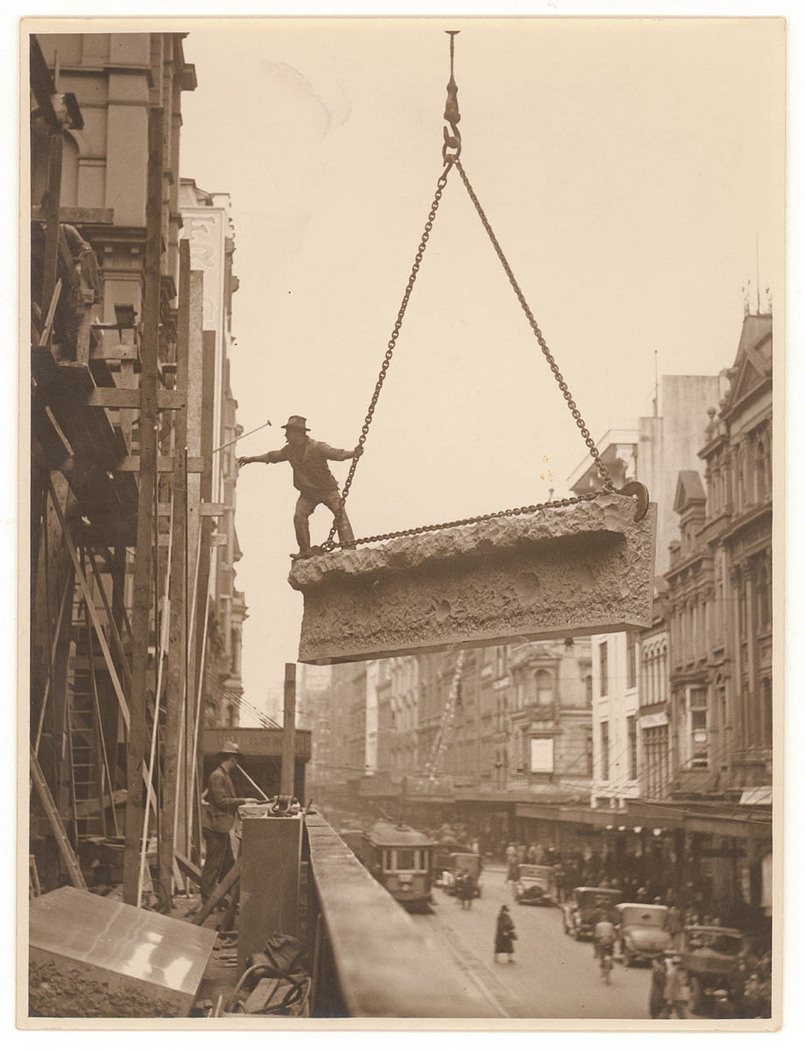
Building labourer on a stone being hoisted up to building, Pitt St, Sydney, c. 1930s. Photo by Sam Hood.

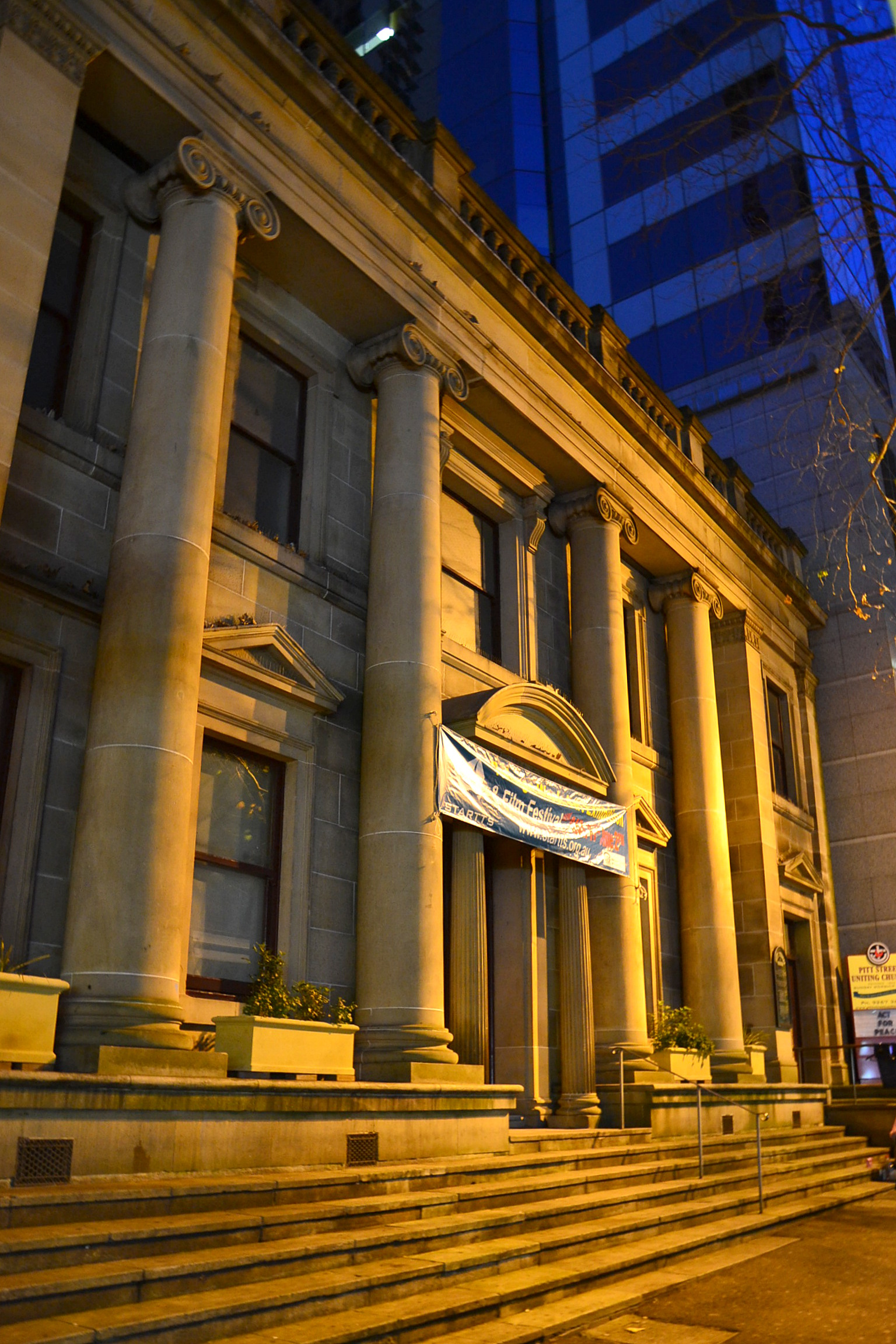
Pitt Street Uniting Church
