= Soul Pattinson Building =

Building in Sydney, Australia

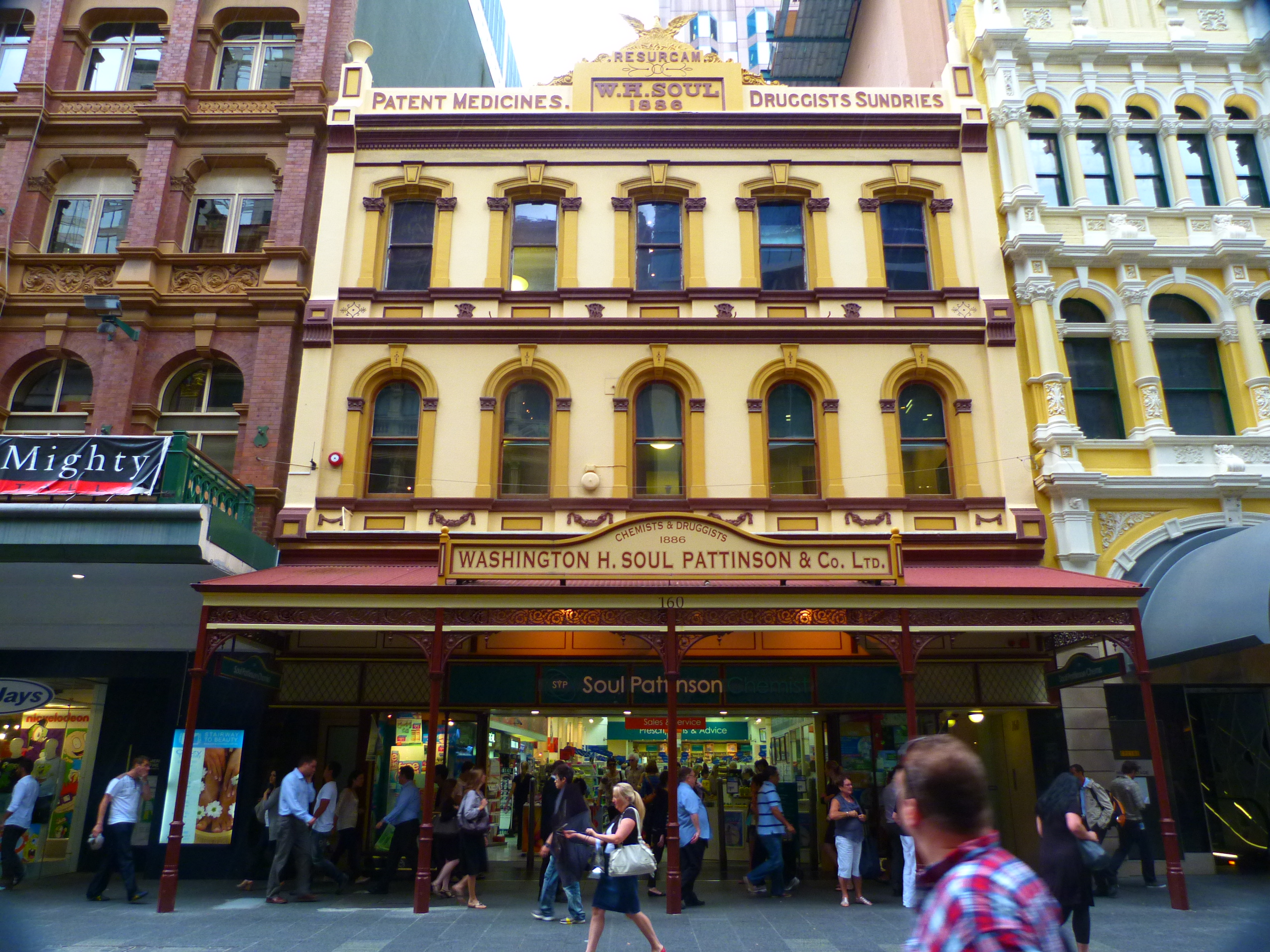
- Pictured when owned and occupied by Washington H Soul Pattinson, 2010

- Location within Sydney
- Alternative names: Phoenix Chambers
- Etymology: Washington H Soul Pattinson

General information
- Status: Completed
- Architectural style: Victorian Italianate
- Location: 158–160 Pitt Street, Sydney, Australia
- Coordinates: 33°52′10″S 151°12′30″E
- Current tenants: Sephora
- Completed: 1877
- Owner: Kingsvest

Design and construction
- Architecture firm: Mansfield Brothers

The Soul Pattinson Building is a Victorian Italianate retail and office building located at 158–160 Pitt Street, Sydney, Australia. The Soul Pattinson Building is located between the Pitt Street Mall and Castlereagh Street, and opposite the Strand Arcade.

== History ==
Washington H Soul Pattinson opened at 177 Pitt Street in 1872 by Caleb Soul and his son, Washington. In 1873 the business moved to larger premises at 158–160 Pitt Street where it remained until the building burnt down in 1886.

In 1887 the building was replaced with a new store named Phoenix Chambers (attributed to a design by the Mansfield Brothers). This remained the company's head office and flagship Soul Pattinson store until 2018, when the store closed.

The building contained several innovative measures including an American-style soda fountain that survived until 1948 and a Ladies Department run by a nurse.

On 23 June 2016, the building was listed for sale, and on 1 March 2018 ownership was transferred from Washington H Soul Pattinson to Kingsvest for $100 million. Soul Pattinson closed down a few days later.

On 12 October 2018 Surf Dive ‘n' Ski opened its pop up store on the ground level space vacated by Soul Pattinson which operated until March 2020.

The space is currently being refitted by Sephora who will move from its location on at Westfield Sydney to the space vacated by Surf Dive 'n' Ski. The building will become the new flagship store opening on 20 January 2021. The store will house all their brands on the ground level whilst the upper floors will become Sephora University, where its beauty advisors will discover new products and master their skills.
