= Perpetual Trustee Company Building =

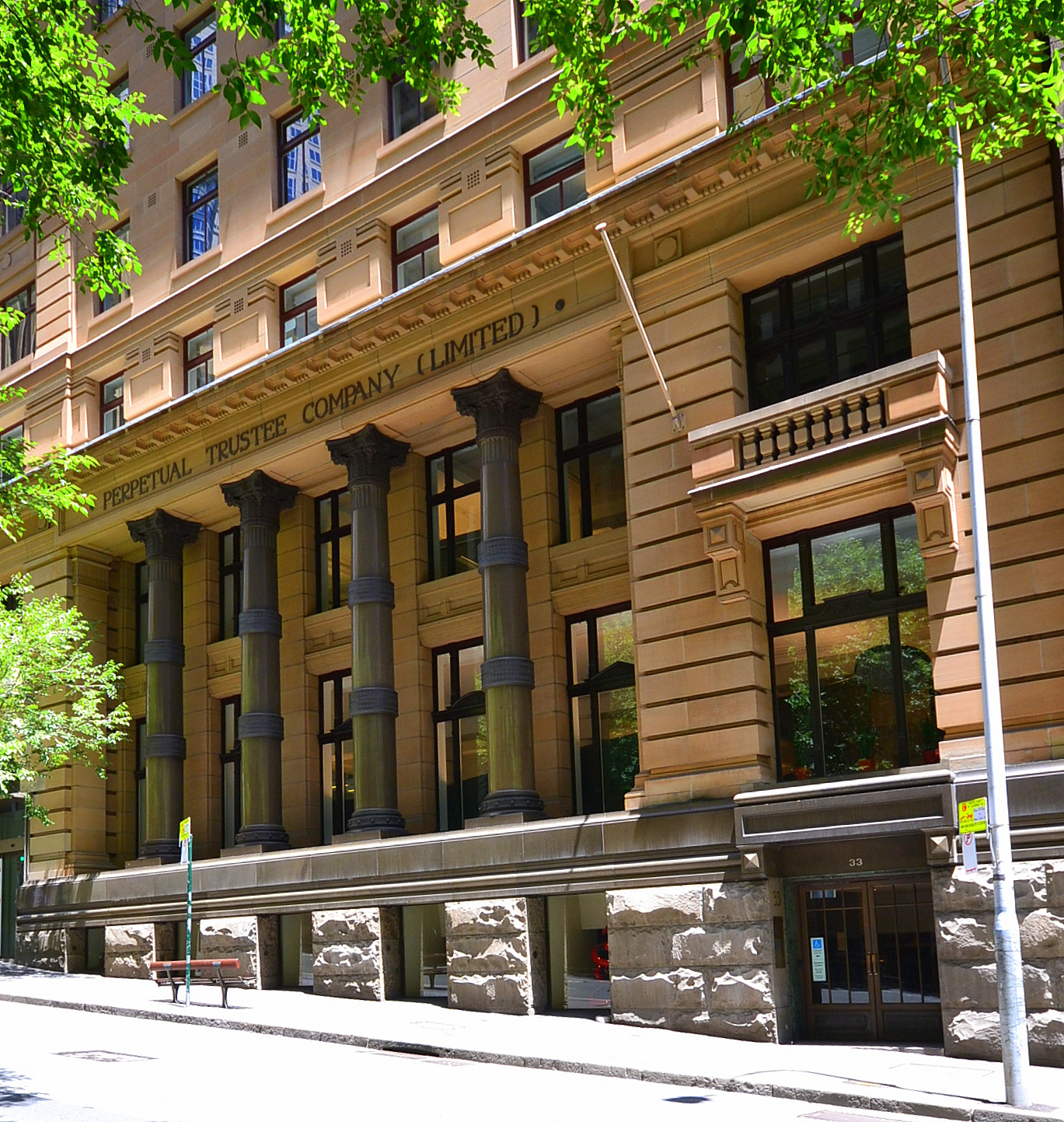

- Location within Sydney Location within Australia
- 33.8663°S 151.2094°E
- Location: 33–39 Hunter Street, Sydney central business district, City of Sydney, New South Wales, Australia

History
- Built: 1914–1916

Site notes
- Architect(s): Robertson and Marks Architects

New South Wales Heritage Register
- Official name: Perpetual Trustee Company
- Type: State heritage (built)
- Designated: 2 April 1999
- Reference no.: 678
- Type: Historic site
- Builders: Messrs Walter Gawne and Sons.

Perpetual Trustee Company Building is a heritage-listed office building at 33–39 Hunter Street, in the Sydney central business district, in the City of Sydney local government area of New South Wales, Australia. It was designed by Robertson and Marks architects and built from 1914 to 1916 by Walter Gawne and Sons. It was added to the New South Wales State Heritage Register on 2 April 1999.

== History ==
The Perpetual Trustee Executor and Agency Company Limited was set up in 1885. An attempt at incorporation failed on the grounds that the company did not have enough capital for security. Following this failure, the company was dissolved in 1886 and the Perpetual Trustee Company was formed with a base of £1,000,000. Application for incorporation passed through the Parliament of New South Wales in June 1888. The Company became one of the first trustee companies to be established in Australia and took place at a time of complex development in the commercial economy.

The site of the Perpetual Trustee Company building was part of a town grant made to William Henry Roberts on 4 July 1837. The property changed hands numerous times and was subdivided into two lots in 1881 before the Perpetual Trustee Company Limited gained freehold possession of the subdivision on the corner of Hunter and Castlreagh Streets in June 1913. Previous owners included Elizabeth Catherine Countess of Carnarvon, the Right Honorable Henry John Earl of Dill and Edward Stafford Howard, all of England, in the 1880s. The intent of the company in purchasing the site was the erection of a new office building to house their own operations together with additional space for leasing.

The building was designed by Roberts and Marks architects, and was constructed between 1914 and 1916 by general contractors Walter Gawne and Sons. Several aspects of the work were contracted out to sub-contractors. In 1916 the building was opened after some unspecified delays. At the time the new building was the dominant development on the southern side of Hunter Street between Pitt and Castlereagh Streets and replaced what was probably one of the last Georgian-era buildings to be removed from Hunter Street.

Between 1917 and 1933 The Perpetual Trustee Company Limited occupied the Ground, First and Seventh floors. In 1936 they occupied the Second, Third and Fourth floors. In 1938 Robertson and Marks applied for approval to convert the then flat roof space to the rear of the building into additional office space and to modify the rear stair for the installation of a lift service. Work carried out in 1959 to remodel the original Hunter Street entry, radically refit internal spaces and to partly infill two of the lightwells resulted in loss and damage to, and obscuring of major portions of original internal fabric.

Further work was carried out after 1959 and the building's setting was drastically altered by the construction boom of the 1960s. The adjoining 22 and 24 storey buildings have since reversed the dominant qualities of the Perpetual Trustee Company building. In 1988 the most recent, reasonably major internal fitout took place, obscuring much of the 1959 work to the entry vestibule.

The Perpetual Trustee Company continued to reside in the building in Hunter Street until 2005.

== Description ==
The Perpetual Trustee Company Building comprises one ground level, seven upper levels and a basement. With the exception of lightwells to the sides, covers the complete area of the site. The overall style of the building is Edwardian "Grand Manner" which is characterised in the building by Baroque inspired columns, mansard roof form embellished with dormer windows and dominant overhanging cornice supported on brackets.

The base is bounded at the top by a large cornice at the level two window sill and at the bottom by courses of rusticated trachyte. The base is articulated by a screen of giant order trachyte columns. Flanking both sides of this screen are bays of smooth rusticated stonework which extends vertically to level seven.

The shaft springs from the level two cornice and terminates at the metal cornice between Level 6 and 7. The shaft's plain appearance is modulated by the presence of a string course at the Level 2 ceiling height and flanking the east and west bays of smooth faced rusticated stonework.

Recessed panels between the windows and heavily detailed stonework further define the area between the Level 2 cornice and string course. The section of facade between the vertical bays is punctured by 5 window openings per floor and is relatively plain with relief being provided by simple projecting window sill blocks and stone cavity vents. The vertical bays are characterised by one large window and a simply designed spandrel block.

Dominated by a 2-storey mansard, the capital section of the facade provides a terminating form to the building. The Level 6 cornice spans the middle vertical bay and is bounded by extensions of the side bays which finish as pediments. The cornice is fabricated from high quality pressed copper sheet and projects forward the face of the facade by approximately 1000mm. It is supported by double brackets in mid span and single brackets at the ends. The brackets are copper clad and are decorated with classical motifs such as garlands and female heads.

=== Modifications and dates ===
- c. 1938 – Flat roof space at rear of building converted into additional office space and rear stair modified for installation of lift service.
- 1959 – Major changes to original stonework involving the removal of the balcony and carved pediment associated with the main entry door. Radical refit of internal spaces.
- 1970 – Major conservation of stonework, including total repointing, rubbing back and indenting where required.
- 1973 – Awning added.
- 1981 – New entrance and partitions.

== Heritage listing ==
The Perpetual Trustee Company Building is of state significance by virtue of its historic, social, architectural, aesthetic and scientific values. The building's construction marked the success of a new form of commercial venture. This success was a reflection of the emerging and complex nature of mid-Victorian society. The fact that the building is still used by its original occupier underscores both the significance of the enterprise and its continuing relevance today.

This building is Hunter Street's sole surviving Edwardian building and displays characteristics of its time. It embodies Edwardian architectural and construction techniques with respect to multi-storey office buildings and has the ability to inform research in this area. Internally the normal cycles of refurbishment has generally negated the ability to demonstrate anything more than current work place practices with the exception of the generally intact Board Room to Level One and the facings to the main access stairway.

Perpetual Trustee Company was listed on the New South Wales State Heritage Register on 2 April 1999 having satisfied the following criteria.

The place is important in demonstrating the course, or pattern, of cultural or natural history in New South Wales.

The Perpetual Trustee Company Building is historically significant as it is a rare surviving example of a purpose built building (c. 1916) which is still occupied by its original occupier. The Perpetual Trustee Company is significant because, when first established in 1888 it was a new type of commercial venture, one which sought to identify a growing community need for an agency to professionally manage deceased estates. This need indicates the emerging complex capitalistic society which was evolving in the 1880s.

Associated with the company were Sydney notables such as Sir Ian Fairfax, first chairman, and Sir Edmund Barton, who later became the first Prime Minister of Australia. The building was constructed to the designs of one of Sydney's longest running firm of architects, Robertson and Marks, architects of many noteworthy buildings.

The place is important in demonstrating aesthetic characteristics and/or a high degree of creative or technical achievement in New South Wales.

The Perpetual Trustee Company Building is an example of Edwardian Office Architecture and major work by the firm of Sydney architects, Robertson and Marks. It is aesthetically significant for its classical elevation treatment to Hunter Street, including the use of sculptured pediments by the award-winning sculptor J. C. Wright. This facade, and the associated side returns, returns display a high level of integrity.

The building is a local landmark as a counterfoil to the surrounding modern developments. The crooked and descending nature of Hunter Street aids the landmark qualities of the building.

The place has a strong or special association with a particular community or cultural group in New South Wales for social, cultural or spiritual reasons.

The Perpetual Trustee Company is valued by the general community and also by the architectural community. The level of esteem is gauged by the placement of the building on a number of different conservation registers at local, state and federal level. The listing of the building itself is a result of community appreciation of its ability to demonstrate a particular phase of the development of Hunter Street and its inherent aesthetic qualities.

The place has potential to yield information that will contribute to an understanding of the cultural or natural history of New South Wales.

The Perpetual Trustee Company Building is a fine example of Edwardian construction techniques applied to a relatively new type of building, the multi-storeyed office block. The building has the ability to inform understanding of pre-World War I use of masonry (sandstone and brickwork) as cladding/faing to a proprietary "fire proof" concrete frame structure. This ability is aided by the presence of limited original documentation.

The building's presence on one of Sydney's oldest streets informs comprehension of Hunter Street's development. It is the only surviving Edwardian building in Hunter Street.

== See also ==
- Australian non-residential architectural styles
- Perpetual Limited
