= Bulletin Place warehouses =

Heritage-listed buildings in Sydney, Australia

Bulletin Place Warehouses
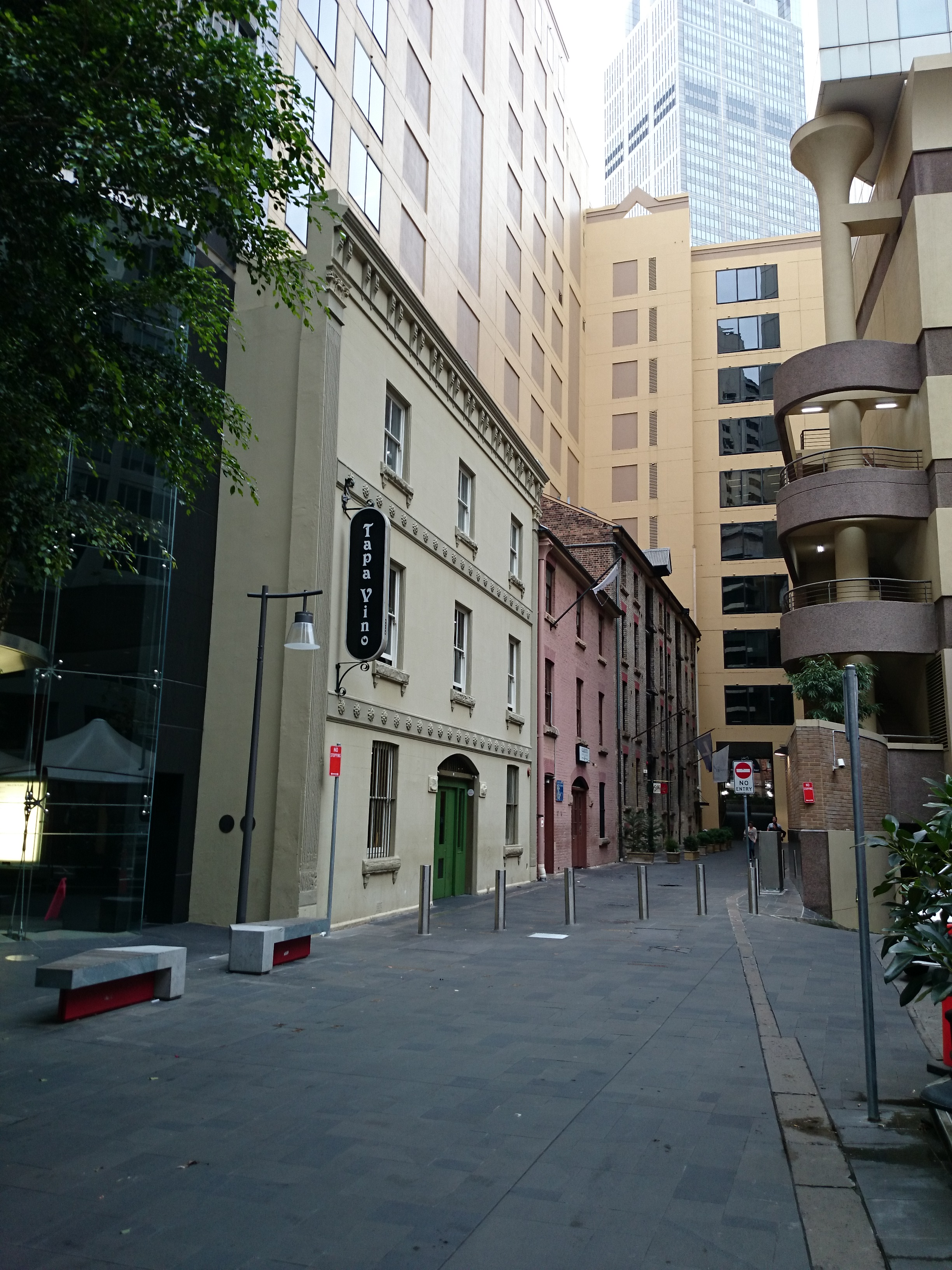
- The warehouses, pictured at left in 2014.

- Location within Sydney Location within Australia
- 33.863°S 151.210°E
- Location: 6–8, 10–14, and 16–18 Bulletin Place, Sydney, Australia

History
- Built: 1880

Site notes
- Architectural styles: Victorian Free Classical; Victorian Georgian

New South Wales Heritage Register
- Official name: Bulletin Place Restaurant; San Francisco Restaurant
- Type: State heritage (built)
- Designated: 2 April 1999
- Reference no.: 651; 652; 653
- Type: Warehouse/storage area
- Category: Commercial

The Bulletin Place Warehouses are a series of three heritage-listed former warehouses and now souvenir sales office, commercial offices, health club, storage area, and restaurant located between 6–18 Bulletin Place, in the Sydney central business district in New South Wales, Australia. The warehouses were built from 1880 and have variously been known as the San Francisco Restaurant. The property is privately owned. It was added to the New South Wales State Heritage Register on 2 April 1999.

== History ==
The site was part of the grant of 1 acre 37 – 1/2 roods made by Governor Macquarie to Andrew Thompson on 1 January 1810. It seems that Mary Reibey, one of the best known early merchants, also owned the land at one time. Thompson was a wealthy emancipist merchant and a favourite of the then Governor, Captain Bligh. When he died in September 1818, the land was sold to William Browne, a Sydney merchant, for £1,075. He sold it to Prosper de Mestre in 1828 for £2,100. De Mestre was a prominent mercantile and public figure, but later fell into financial trouble in the early 1840s depression. In 1875 the property was sold again, to Edward Terry. Terry and his wife, Eleanor, let it to tenants.

The first reference to "Bulletin Place" was in Sands Sydney Directory in 1867, when it was described as a lane. By 1870 it had been upgraded into a passageway, and in 1890 it was recorded as Bulletin Place. Bulletin Place is the only Sydney thoroughfare named after a publication, for it was here that J. F. Archibald's famous weekly The Bulletin was published for many years following its foundation in 1880. The Bulletin owned stores and offices at the intersection of the passageway with Pitt Street. Bulletin Place is situated on land reclaimed from the mouth of the historic Tank Stream, which today runs underneath Pitt Street. The Bulletin remained in this location until 1897, when it moved to newer and larger offices in George Street.

It appears that the warehouses were erected before 1880, as it appears in Percy Dove's Sydney map of that year. Its basic form suggests an earlier date of construction. Howells dates the building as "c. 1850s". It underwent reinstatement after a fire in 1937 and became a wine bottling and filtering facility in 1950. In 1981 the ground floor was used for wine auctions.

From 1880 to 1884 it was occupied by Mrs Eliza Tinsley, ironmonger. Merchant brothers Mahlon Clarke and Thomas Cowlishaw acquired the property in March 1888 from Edward Terry. The Cowlishaw Bros. were heavily involved in the coal trade. A c. 1920s photo indicates that this building was part of a larger warehouse that extended to Pitt Street demolished in 1965 for the construction of Export House. The warehouse, at the corner of Pitt Street and Bulletin Place (leased as offices) was owned by Bernhardt Otto Holtermann who had a successful commercial agency there between 1877 and 1885. He is best known for his mine at Hill End, which yielded the largest gold reef specimen in the world. Sydney City Council paved both Bulletin Place and Macquarie Place turning them into pedestrian walkways. Council records of 1955 note that at least a part of the building was used for printing, duplicating, typing and bookbinding. The Cowlishaws retained ownership until 1955.

Other companies which have occupied the warehouse are: Sandy & Co. Glass, Oil & Colour Stores; Chard Marshall; J. C. Steel Tanners; Harrison & Whitton Skin & Produce Merchants; and the Sydney Volcanic Aerated Water Company. In later years it was used for a variety of purposes including manufacturing and commercial operations, and in the 1960s became a restaurant and cocktail bar. Its facade was restored in 1973.

Northbourne Developments bought all three Bulletin Place properties 6–8, 10–12 and 14–18 in 1986. In 1988 they renovated three warehouses lining Bulletin Place (6–8; 10–14; 16–18) using Clive Lucas, Stapleton & Partners heritage consultants) and constructed a $150million dollar retail and office complex on the corner adjoining Macquarie Place development at the end of the street on the corner of Macquarie Place. The major development complex was due for completion in March 1990. The oldest building (16–18 Bulletin Place) leased to Len Evans Wine Co.) was established around 1895 as a two-storey warehouse belonging to Austin's Stores. The second-oldest (6–8 Bulletin Place) leased by Bulletin Place restaurant) was originally owned by Elliot Bros. Druggists and then became the premises of Tinsley Ironmonger. The third warehouse, is 10–14 Bulletin Place, on the corner of Pitt Street, (leased to the Len Evans Wine Company) was established around 1895 as a two-storey warehouse belonging to Austin & Co. Sydney City Council paved both Bulletin Place and Macquarie Place turning them into pedestrian walkways.

Restoration of the facade occurred in 1990. A Japanese takeaway food business was established in 1993, followed by a first floor restaurant in 1994. In May 1993 the property was sold by Depaxu Pty Ltd and acquired by Nezaba Pty Ltd. The present use of 6–8 Bulletin Place as a souvenir business commenced in 1993. In 1993 the property was sold by Northbourne and bought by financial planners MacDonald McGregor.

== Description ==
=== 6–8 Bulletin Place ===
Three storey brick Victorian Free Classical style building. This building is one of three former adjacent warehouses in Bulletin Place. It is built of loadbearing brickwork, finished in stucco lined to simulate ashlar and decorated in a Free Classical manner and painted. The symmetrical facade is embraced by slender pilasters with debased Corinthian capitals, topped by a parapet treated as an entablature with a bracketed frieze. The floor levels are marked by string courses embellished with paterae. Windows are double hung sashes with bracketed stone sills. The wide doorway (original loading doorway) has a segmented arch head with stone impost blocks. The roughly finished north-west end wall indicates where this building continued as part of 2 Bulletin Place, now demolished. The internal structure, three bays wide and two bays deep, has chamfered timber storey posts, girders and joists. The roof is supported on posts tenoned into a beam. The ceiling is lined with boards and there is a single rooflight. There is a timber stair of two flights.

==== Detail ====
- Category: Individual Buildings.
- Style: Victorian Free Classical.
- Storeys: Three.
- Facade: Painted Stucco; Timber Framed Windows & Doors.
- Side/Rear Walls: Painted Brick.
- Internal Walls: Painted Brick; Timber Studs with Plasterboard.
- Roof Cladding: Inaccessible but believed to be corrugated steel.
- Internal Structure: Timber posts & girders.
- Floor: Timber joists.
- Roof: Timber Rafters.
- Ceilings: Lining boards; plasterboard.
- Stairs: Timber.
- Sprinkler System: Yes.
- Lifts: No.
- General details: This building is in good condition, externally and internally. The survival of this building and two adjacent warehouses, all on shallow sites in a narrow street, retains a tiny part of an historic streetscape. Internally the timber posts and some of the girders are still visible, although interior fittings and surfaces have in recent years been adapted for use as a souvenir shop.

==== Modifications and dates ====
Intrusive elements: Illuminated vertical projecting and wall signs.

=== 10–14 Bulletin Place ===
One of a group of former warehouses whose scale and diversity is a rare surviving reminder of the undisciplined 19th-century commercial development of Sydney Cove, and gives a pleasant pedestrian character, rare in the City of Sydney, to the narrow spaces of Bulletin Place and Reiby Place.

A three-storey former warehouse of Flemish bond sandstock brick. Three-bay front, 18-pane shuttered windows with sandstone sills and brick lintels. Gabled roof with modern box gutter; facade to ground floor rendered and modernised. Window layout and floor heights suggest it may have been built with No. 6-8, with faulty render since removed. Date: before 1880.

The building was occupied by Elliot Bros Stores in 1883-4 (Sands Directory). The architectural style: 19th century. The building material is sandstock brick.

=== 16–18 Bulletin Place ===
16–18 Bulletin Place is the largest of three adjoining similarly scaled former warehouses in Bulletin Place. It is a brick building four storeys high, with a basement half a storey below street level. Structurally it is divided into four longitudinal bays and two lateral bays, with heavy timber posts, girders, joists, floors and trusses mostly still visible. The sliding timber loading doors retain their chained footplates and overhead cat-head hoist beams and pulleys; one cathead still protected by a gable. The windows have flat segmental arched heads, picked out in lined colourwash; all have sandstone sills and all but those of the top storey have iron grilles. The main walling, laid in Flemish bond, employs cream common bricks said to have been imported from Scotland. The interior, though refurbished in 1967 and the 1980s still has original timber structure and some fittings visible.

==== Detail ====
- Category: Individual Building.
- Style: Victorian Georgian.
- Storeys: Four + Basement.
- Facade: Cream Brickwork with Colourwashed Arches, Stone Sills and Timber Windows and Doors.
- Side/Rear Walls: Brick.
- Internal Walls: Modern Timber and Metal Stud Partitions with Plasterboard.
- Roof Cladding: Corrugated Metal.
- Internal Structure: Timber Posts and Girders.
- Floor: Joists, Herringbone Strutting and Flooring Boards.
- Roof: Timber King-Post Trusses.
- Ceilings: Mostly Exposed Floor Structure.
- Stairs: Timber.
- Sprinkler System: Yes.
- Lifts: None.
- General Details: The facade is articulated very cleverly, giving an effect of two overlapping elements, each comprising a central loading bay with a goods entrance at street level, flanked by paired windows. Thus the rhythm of the openings on each storey is 2-windows, 1-door, 2-windows, 1-door, 2-windows. Though described elsewhere as "in the vernacular tradition", it is a sophisticated design. The sheaves and cylinder of a hydraulic hoist survive beside the top loading doorway at the north-west end of the building.

==== Modifications and dates ====
c. 1880s (Howells, c. 1850s)

== Heritage listing ==
The Bulletin Place Warehouses were listed on the New South Wales State Heritage Register on 2 April 1999.

== See also ==
- Australian non-residential architectural styles
