= Perpetual (company) =

Australian investment fund

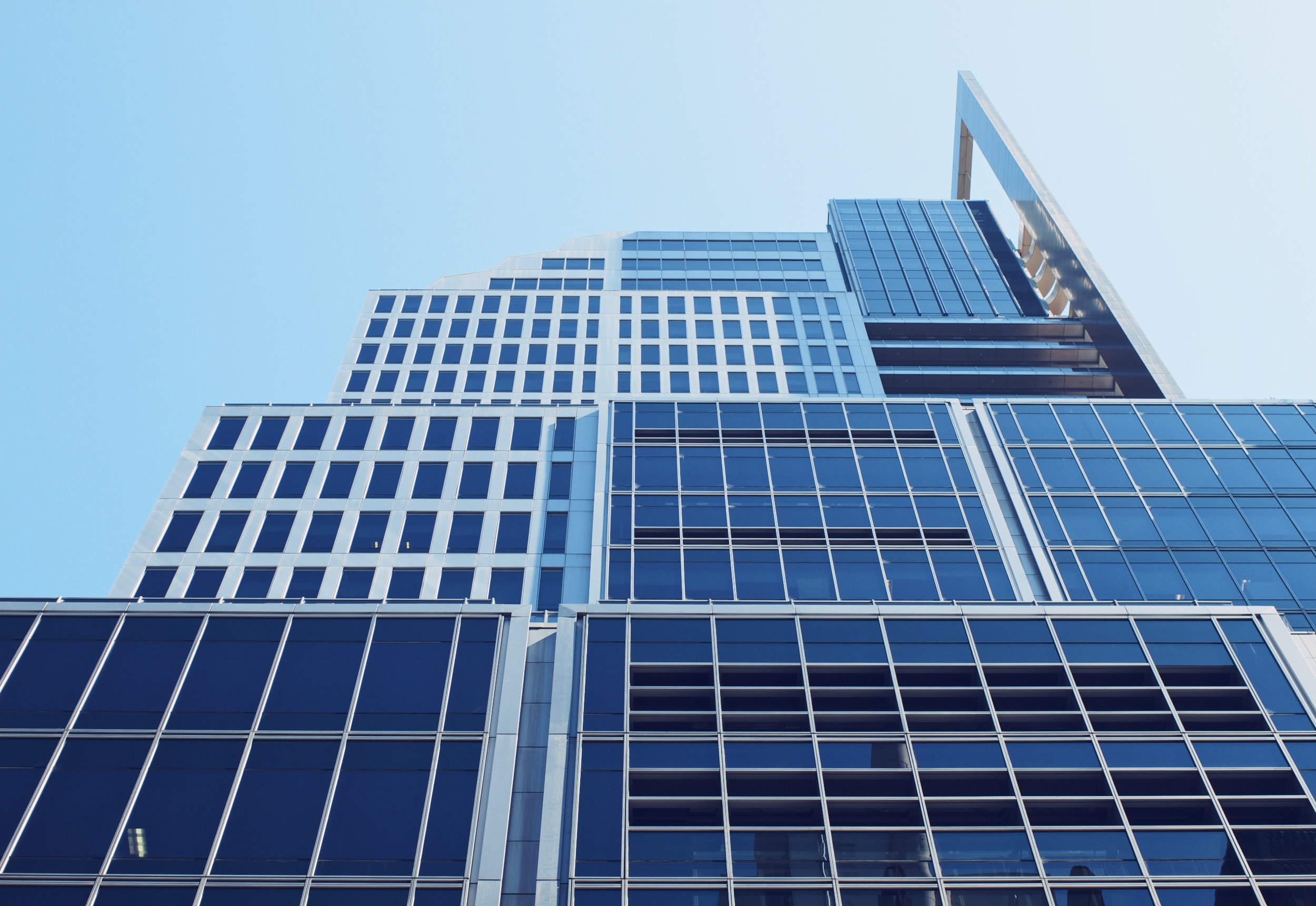
- Headquarters in Sydney
- Type: Public (ASX: PPT)
- Industry: Finance
- Founded: Sydney, Australia (1886)
- Headquarters: Sydney, Australia
- Key people: Bernard Reilly (CEO); Gregory Cooper (Chairman)
- Products: Financial services
- AUM: AU$226.8 billion (June 2025)
- Subsidiaries: Trillium Asset Management Barrow Hanley Global Investors Fordham Group Priority Life Jacaranda Financial Planning The Private Practice
- Website: http://www.perpetual.com.au

Perpetual is an Australian investment fund and trustee group in the S&P/ASX 200. The company provides investment products, financial advice, philanthropic and corporate services to individuals, families, financial advisers and organisations.

== History ==
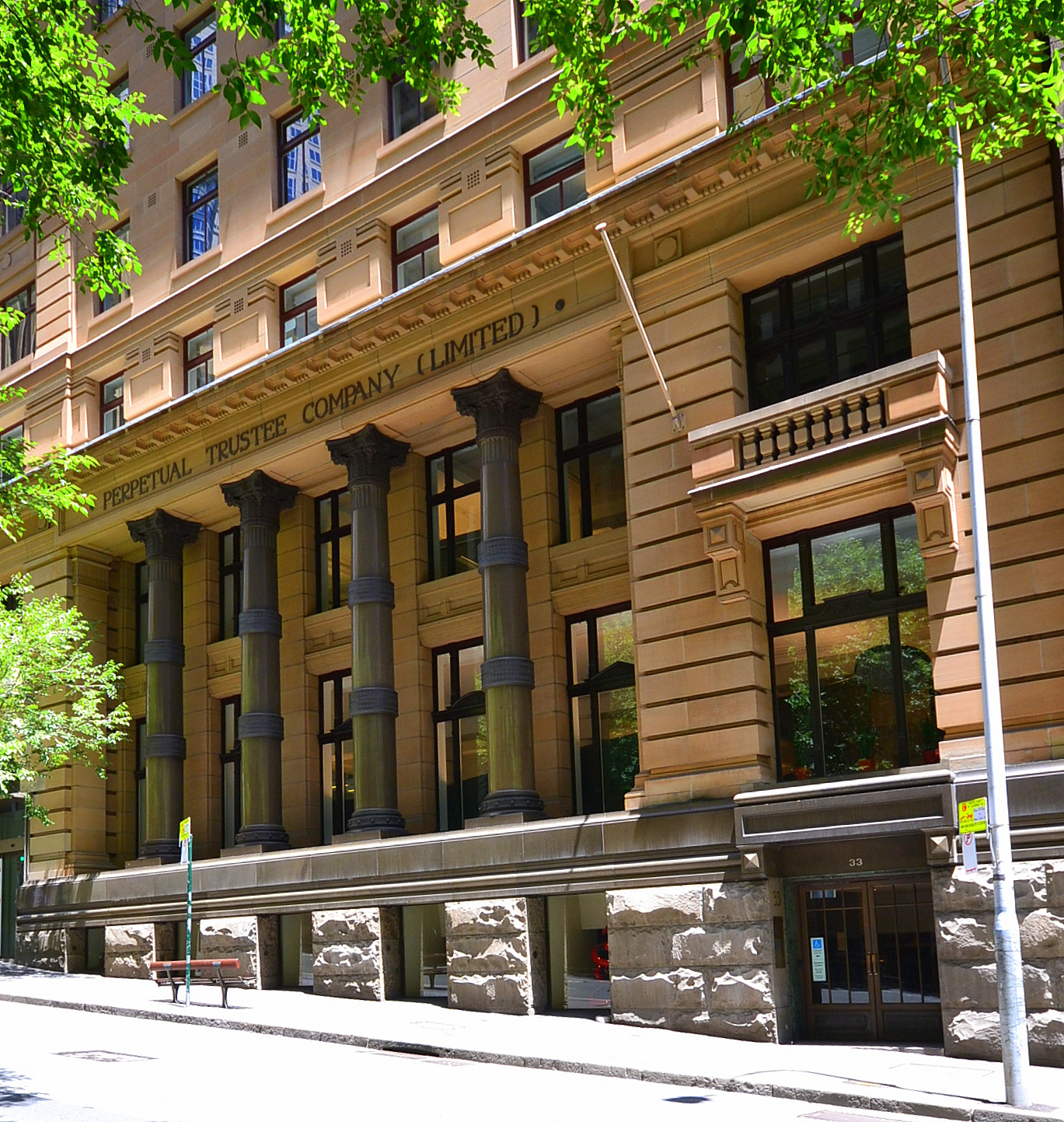
The heritage-listed Perpetual Trustee Company Building

Perpetual was conceived in 1885 by a committee of business professionals with the purpose of forming a trustee company. The committee included Edmund Barton, Australia's 1st Prime Minister, managing director John Street of the Street family and chairman James Fairfax of the Fairfax family.

The Perpetual Trustee Company (Limited) was officially formed in 1886, originally based at 105 Pitt Street, Sydney. John Pewtress, an accountant, became the first employee. In 1888, a special act was granted to Perpetual (the power) to act as a corporate executor and trustee by the NSW Legislative Assembly. An increasing number of prominent citizens appointed Perpetual as executor or trustee of their estates – in many cases for generations.

Perpetual continued to develop a strong and secure reputation throughout the First World War and The Great Depression. At that time, Perpetual Trustee Company controlled trust estates to the value of £50,000,000, making it easily Australia's largest trustee company. In 1935, all staff were required to sign an ‘Obligation of Secrecy’ book, a practice that continued until 1988.

In 1963, The Perpetual Executors & Trustees Association of Australia Ltd (Victoria) and Queensland Trustees Ltd, which had operated in their own states since the 1880s, merged with Perpetual Trustee Company Ltd (NSW). In 1964, Perpetual listed its shares on the Australian Securities Exchange, and this continues today.

During the 1980s, 1990s and 2000s (decade), Perpetual expanded beyond its traditional trustee business into the rapidly developing funds management industry. This included superannuation, financial advice, and corporate trustee and securitisation services.

In 2020, Perpetual expanded globally by acquiring two specialist asset management firms; Barrow Hanley Global Investors, a leader in global value investing, and Trillium Asset Management, an industry pioneer in environmental, social and governance (ESG) investing and shareholder advocacy.

In April 2022 Perpetual launched a takeover offer for Pendal Group. Pendal Group's shareholders accepted the offer in December 2022 with the transaction to taking effect in January 2023.

In 2024, Kohlberg Kravis Roberts was in negotiations to acquire Perpetual's wealth management and corporate trust units for AU$2.2 billion. These talks were terminated in February 2024.

== See also ==
- Perpetual Trustee Company Building
