= Hunter Street, Sydney =

Street in Sydney, Australia

Hunter Street, Sydney New South Wales
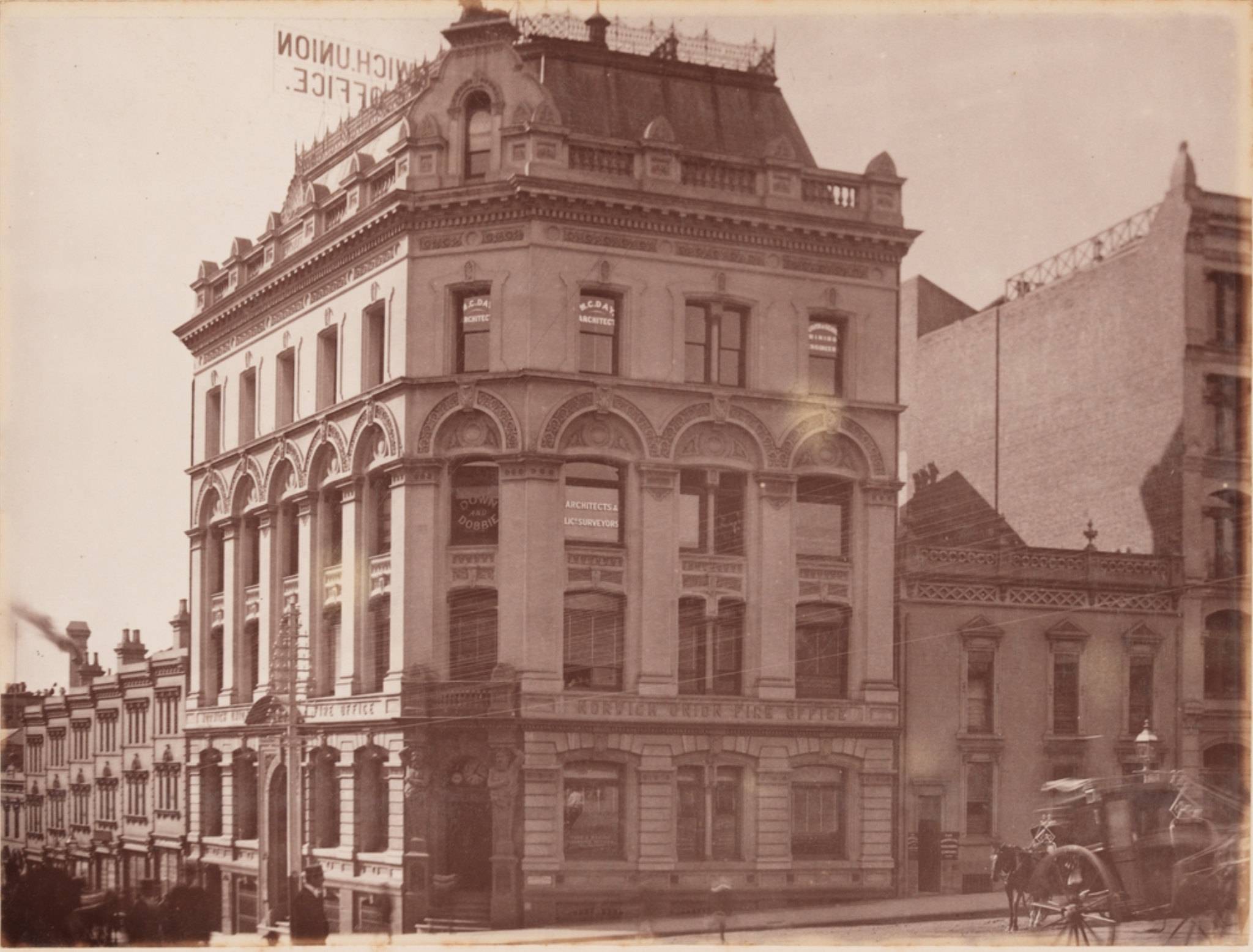
- Norwich Chambers, corner of Hunter and Bligh Streets, 1890
- Coordinates: 33°51′56″S 151°12′26″E (Western end); 33°51′59″S 151°12′44″E (Eastern end)

General information
- Type: Street
- Length: 800 m (0.5 mi)

Major junctions
- Western end: George Street; Sydney CBD
- Pitt Street; Castlereagh Street; Elizabeth Street; Phillip Street
- Eastern end: Macquarie Street; Sydney CBD

Location(s)
- LGA(s): City of Sydney
- Major suburbs: Sydney CBD

Hunter Street located in the Sydney central business district in New South Wales, Australia is one of the oldest streets in Sydney. It runs from George Street in the west to Macquarie Street in the east. The street was originally named Bell Street. It is named after Governor Hunter, the second Governor of New South Wales.

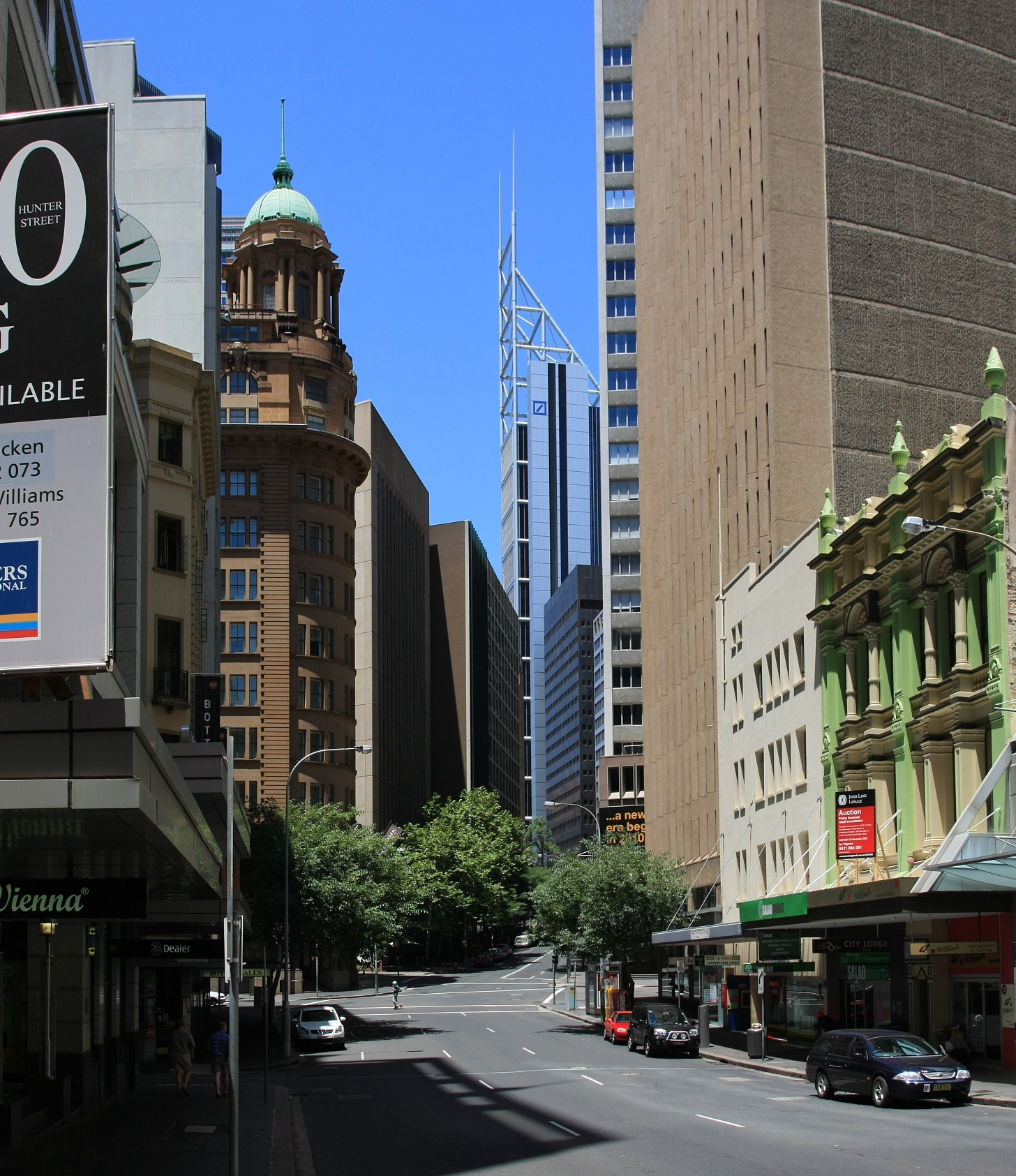
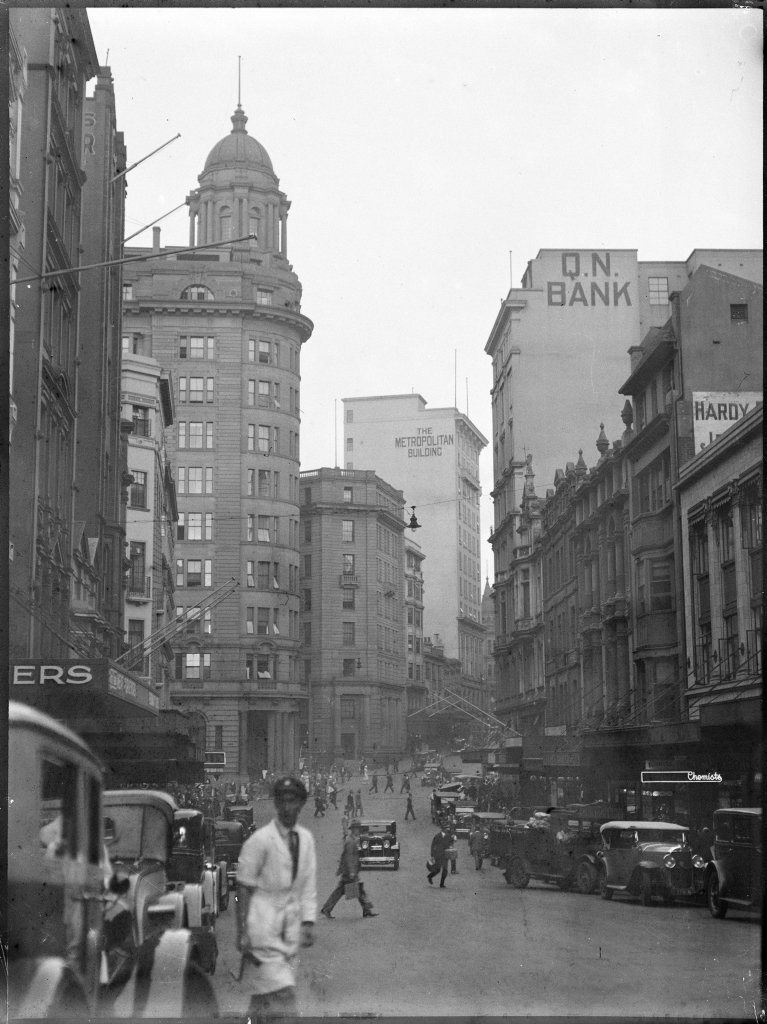
A 2010 view of Hunter Street from George Street and as it appeared in the early 1900s

In the 1860s the street housed the glove shop of 'Sharp Lewis' whose large gloved hand swung over the footpath. Next door were the 'Parrot Brothers', who supplied footwear to the people of Sydney. The site of the old Norwich Chambers on the corner of Bligh Street was once occupied by a dentist named Smythe and later was the office of the solicitor William Barker. It was built in 1886 and demolished in 1922. The heritage-listed office building Perpetual Trustee Company Building at 33–39 Hunter Street is the only example of Edwardian architecture on Hunter Street.

Originally two-way throughout, in February 1987 the Pitt to George Street section was converted to one-way in a westerly direction.

In 2032, the street will become home to metro station as part of the Metro West project.
