= The Battlers for Kelly Bush =

Australian conservation group

- Nickname: Battlers
- Formation: 27 September 1970
- Purpose: Protection of Kellys Bush Park from demolition by construction companies
- Region served: New South Wales
- Members: 13 members, all women from Hunter's Hill.

The Battlers for Kelly Bush, also known as the "Battlers" were an Australian protest group founded in 1970 consisting of 13 women who were dedicated to the protection of Kellys Bush, an area of bushland located in Hunters Hill, New South Wales. Partially due to the protection by the Battlers, Hunters Hill became the first ever "Green Ban" area in the world.

They were dedicated to protecting Kelly's Bush from demolition by construction company AVJennings. To achieve their aim of preventing the demolition the battlers enlisted the support of the Builders Labourers Federation. This shocked many conservative members of the conservative Hunters Hill Trust, as many of the Builders Labourers Federation's leaders were Communists, including most notably Jack Mundey, Bob Pringle (trade unionist), and Joe Owens.

According to the Dictionary of Sydney, the Battlers were supported by the National Trust of Australia, among many other conservation organisations.

== Names of 13 Battlers ==
Of the 13 members of the Battlers, their names were Miriam Hamilton, Chris Dawson, Betty James (President), Jo Bell, Judy Taplin, Kath Lehany (secretary), Monica Sheehan (assistant secretary), Joan Croll, Mary Farrell, Trude Kallir, Kathleen Chubb, Margaret Stobo, and Marjorie Fitzgerald.

== Legacy ==
The Battlers were successful in preventing the destruction of Kellys Bush. This set a precedent across Australia for the protection of green areas.

In 2021 Hunters Hill Council commemorated the achievements of the Battlers by publishing a short video featuring one of the original Battlers members.

== Further reading and sources ==
- Pip Kalajzich (editor). The Battlers for Kelly's Bush: Thirteen Women and the World's First Green Ban. 1996.
- Margaret Shaw. The History of the Battle to Save Kelly's Bush. 2021. Rack & Rune Publishing.
- State Library of New South Wales. Oral history interviews with Battlers for Kelly's Bush, Hunters Hill, Sydney. 1992–1994. MLOH 104.
