= Sirius Building =

Apartment complex in Sydney, Australia

Sirius
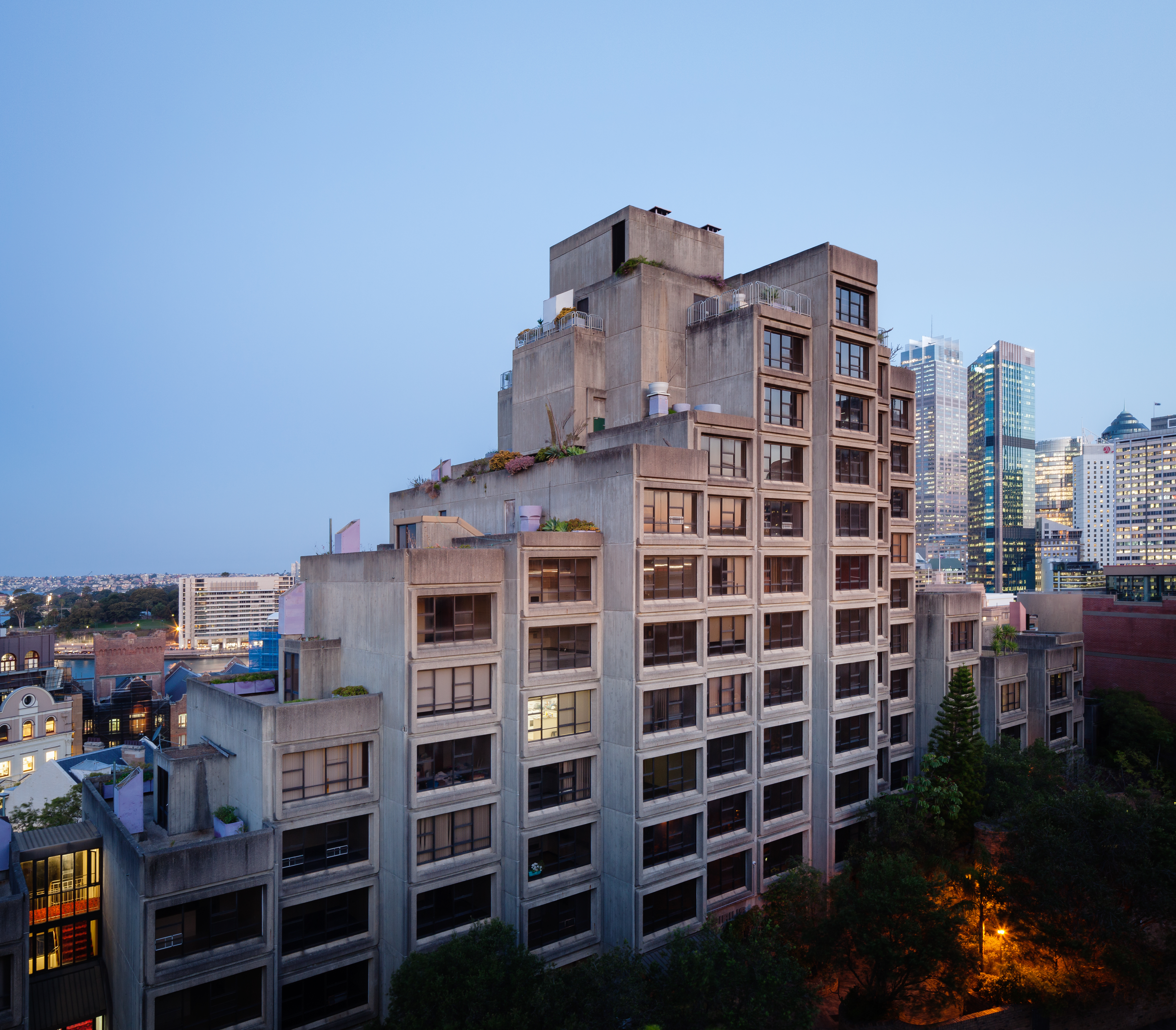
- Sirius

- Location within Sydney

General information
- Status: Completed
- Type: Housing
- Architectural style: Brutalist
- Location: 38 to 70 Cumberland Street, The Rocks, Sydney, Australia
- Coordinates: 33.8577°S 151.2079°E
- Named for: Sirius; HMS Sirius
- Completed: 1980
- Opened: 16 May 1981
- Renovated: 2022–2024
- Client: Housing Commission of NSW
- Owner: Property NSW

Height
- Height: varies from one to twelve storeys

Technical details
- Structural system: Concrete frame & precast concrete sections

Design and construction
- Architect: Theodorus (Tao) Gofers
- Awards: New South Wales Enduring Architecture Award, 2018

Other information
- Number of units: Total 79 (49 in High Rise, 30 in Low Rise); 28 x 1 Bedroom; 24 x 2 Bedroom Split Level; 14 x 2 Bedroom Single Level; 8 x 3 Bedroom Split Level; 5 x 4 Bedroom Split Level

The Sirius Building is an apartment complex in The Rocks district of Sydney, New South Wales, Australia. Designed for the Housing Commission of New South Wales in 1978–1979 by commission architect Tao Gofers, the building is a prominent example of Brutalist architecture in Australia. It also has striking repetitive geometries in reaction to the Japanese metabolist architecture movement. Notable for being the only high rise development in The Rocks, Sirius housed 79 apartments with one, two, three or four bedrooms, generally with single storey apartments to two and three storey walk ups. The complex was built to rehouse displaced public tenants after a controversial redevelopment of the Rocks during the 1960s and 70s.

From 2015, the Sirius building was at the centre of controversy over plans to remove the residents, sell off the building and possibly redevelop the site, with opponents of the plans seeking to secure its protection as a heritage building. Following the NSW Government's decision to refuse heritage listing in 2017, against the advice of the Heritage Council of New South Wales, the building was put up for sale.

In 2018, the building won the Enduring Architecture Award from NSW Australian Institute of Architects.

== Design ==
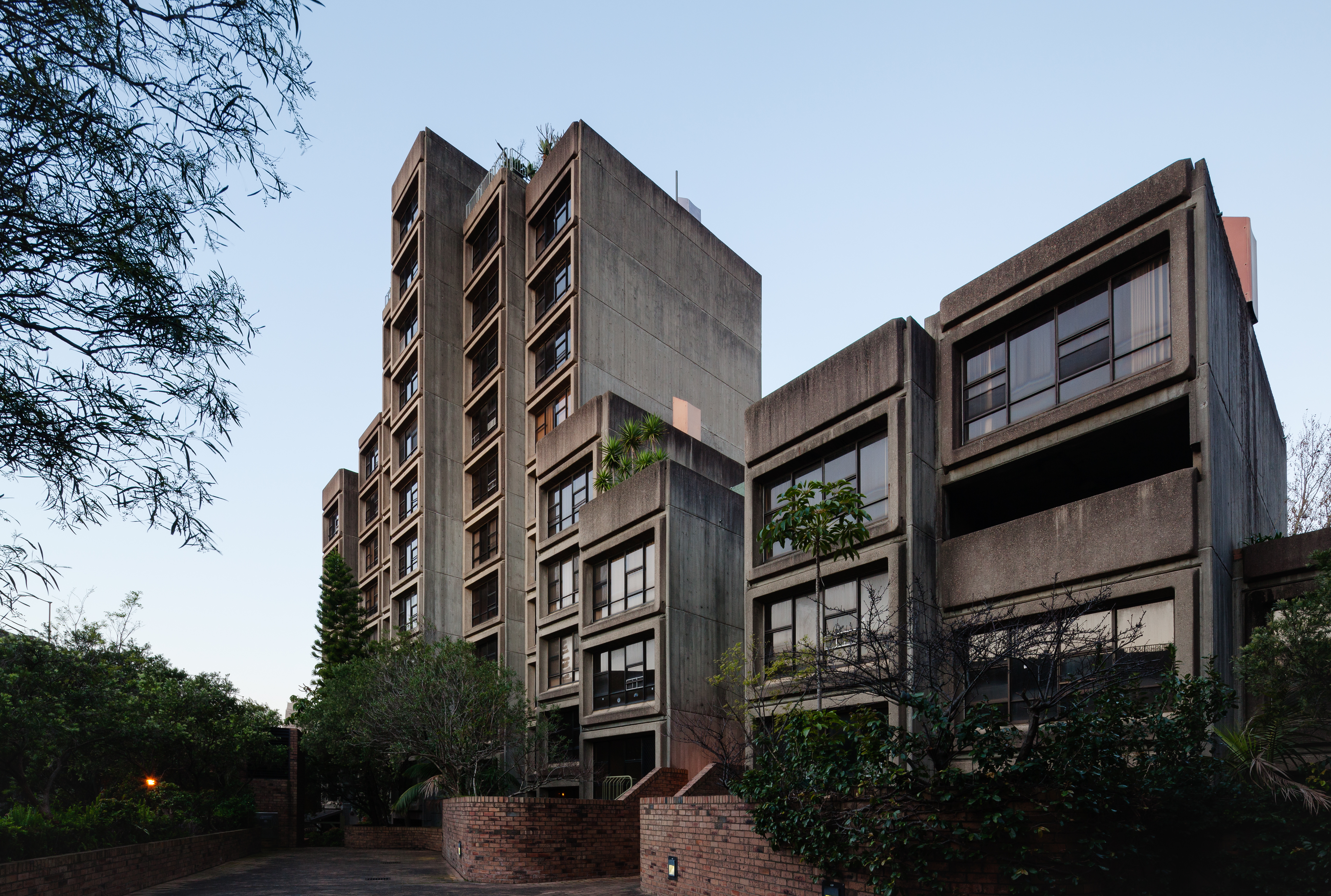
Sirius Sydney. Exterior from shared courtyard

The complex was built to rehouse public tenants who had been displaced after a controversial redevelopment of the historic Rocks suburb during the 1960s and 70s. The building housed many of the original residents who fought for their right to remain in the area during the famous Green bans, whose purpose was not to retain heritage buildings but rather to retain the working class community in The Rocks. Many of the buildings remain, but the majority of the residents were moved into the Sirius apartments in the so-called 'people's plan'. The terraces and town houses they used to call home are owned by the Sydney Harbour Foreshore Authority (SHFA), who receive rent from the tenants living in the building.

Sirius is among the few quality examples of the Brutalism style in Australia, demonstrating the style's objective of ethical design based on social concerns, as well as its focus on the truthful expression of materials, function and structure. Designed by Housing Commission architect, Tao Gofers, Sirius was based on Gofer's other major project for the Housing Commission: The Laurels, a public housing development in southern Sydney's Sans Souci. Like that development, Gofers’ original plan was to finish the building in a white colour to match the nearby Sydney Opera House, but due to budget constraints, the building was finished unpainted.

Anecdotally, unit 74 of the Sirius building became somewhat of an unofficial Sydney landmark; its sign displaying ‘One Way! Jesus’ clearly visible to Harbour Bridge commuters. The sign was in place for around 10 years, although the owner of the sign, Owen McAloon, and his motivations to spread a Christian message remained generally unknown.

The Deutsches Architekturmuseum (DAM) in Frankfurt has incorporated Sirius into #SOSBrutalism, an architectural database comprising over 700 Brutalist structures associated with an international preservation campaign. Entries highlighted in red indicate buildings facing immediate risk. While Australian representation in the database is limited, Sirius is classified among the most endangered Brutalist structures globally.

== Decisions about the building's future ==
A decision to sell the building was made in 2015 by the Baird Coalition government, thereby placing it under risk of demolition due to a lack of any heritage protection. The NSW Heritage Council recommended heritage listing for the building in 2016, but this was denied by the Heritage Minister, Mark Speakman. The Land and Environment Court of New South Wales was advised in a hearing that redevelopment would affect views of the Sydney Opera House, a World Heritage Site, as well as "impinge on the Rocks' low-rise heritage, wharves, sandstone buildings and Victorian terraces".

In July 2016 Speakman announced that the building would not be heritage listed "despite a unanimous recommendation by the Heritage Council", citing the loss of financial return as a consequence of listing as the reason. The Sirius building is included on the World Monuments Fund's 2018 list of monuments at risk, with the listing calling "on the government of New South Wales to respect the recommendation of its heritage experts and allow its citizens to maintain an important social legacy".

In July 2017, the Land and Environment Court ruled the decision by the state’s then-heritage minister Mark Speakman not to place the Sirius public housing complex on the State Heritage Register was “invalid and of no legal effect.” The court determined the government’s claim of financial loss did not constitute “financial hardship” and that the minister failed to consider the building’s heritage significance in his decision. The court ordered the Minister for Heritage (Gabrielle Upton at the time of the ruling) “to make a decision either to direct or not to direct the listing of the Sirius Apartment Building [...] according to the law". In October 2017, Upton again refused to list Sirius on the state heritage register, noting "In my view, [Sirius] is not a landmark worthy of State heritage protection."

The last remaining resident was Myra Demetriou, who in 2017 was 90 and legally blind. Efforts to move the last residents were made to accommodation described as "unsuitable". Demetriou moved out as the last resident on 1 February 2018. The Sirius building is set to welcome new residents in July 2024, five years after its contentious sale and subsequent redevelopment.

== Public support ==
The S.O.S. (Save Our Sirius Foundation) was formed by people and organisations campaigning to save Sirius and its residents and is supported by the National Trust of Australia, the Australian Institute of Architects, the Millers Point Residents Action Group, Friends of Millers Point, Millers Point Public Housing Tenants Group, Unions NSW, CFMEU, and Jack Mundey, the Green Ban campaigner who helped save The Rocks from redevelopment in the 1970s. Previous NSW chapter president of the Australian Institute of Architects, Shaun Carter, is chairman of the Save Our Sirius Foundation. Carter has argued that any decision about the building should take account of its social, cultural and environmental significance.

A set of "S.O.S." lights flashed over The Rocks and Circular Quay from the top floor of Sirius when they were first installed to coincide with the exhibition S.O.S. Save our Sirius on 2 November 2014. Resident McAloon's sign was briefly replaced by lights flashing S.O.S. to the Harbour Bridge traffic, but this was soon 'confiscated' by Housing NSW and McAloon 'relocated' by Housing NSW.

Other supporters of the building include Sydney Lord Mayor Clover Moore, state member for Sydney, Alex Greenwich, and the Australian Labor Party. Anthony Albanese described the Sirius building as "not just a place people call home, but a symbol of inclusion", while the local member for Sydney, Tanya Plibersek called the government's decision to sell "heartless". The S.O.S Foundation suggested that Sirius could be saved if Lendlease were to purchase the building and develop some of its apartments for social and affordable housing. When Lendlease announced they would not be making a bid for the building, the foundation announced its intention to assemble a bid.

Various public protests supported the inclusion of the building on the State heritage Register, including a petition, a crowd funded legal challenge, whose organisers aim to have the Minister's decision annulled; a rally; and a green ban announced by the Construction, Forestry and Maritime Employees Union (CFMEU), under which no company associated with union will be involved with any proposed demolition of the building.

== Purchase ==
On 28 June 2019, the NSW government announced that Sirius would be refurbished rather than demolished. The NSW Housing Minister, Melinda Pavey, announced that the building had been sold for A$150 million to Sirius Developments Pty Ltd, which was owned by private investment firm JDH Capital, subsequently identified as a shell company for Sirius Developments, set up for the deal by Jean-Dominique Huynh, and apparently without the requisite experience delivering a project "of a similar scale". It is intended that the building will be redeveloped into 76 apartments, plus retail and commercial spaces. The proceeds of the sale are expected to provide social housing for around 630 people. On release $435 million worth of apartments were sold by developer JDH Capital in one weekend at a rate of $118,000 per square metre.

== Redevelopment ==
The major 2022–2023 refurbishment and significant changes to the built form are being undertaken by JDH Capital, BVN Architecture (architecture and interiors), 360 Degrees Landscape Architects and Kelly Hoppen (penthouse and lobby interiors) with construction by Richard Crookes Construction. Branding and marketing collateral was prepared by Hoyne.

== Book ==
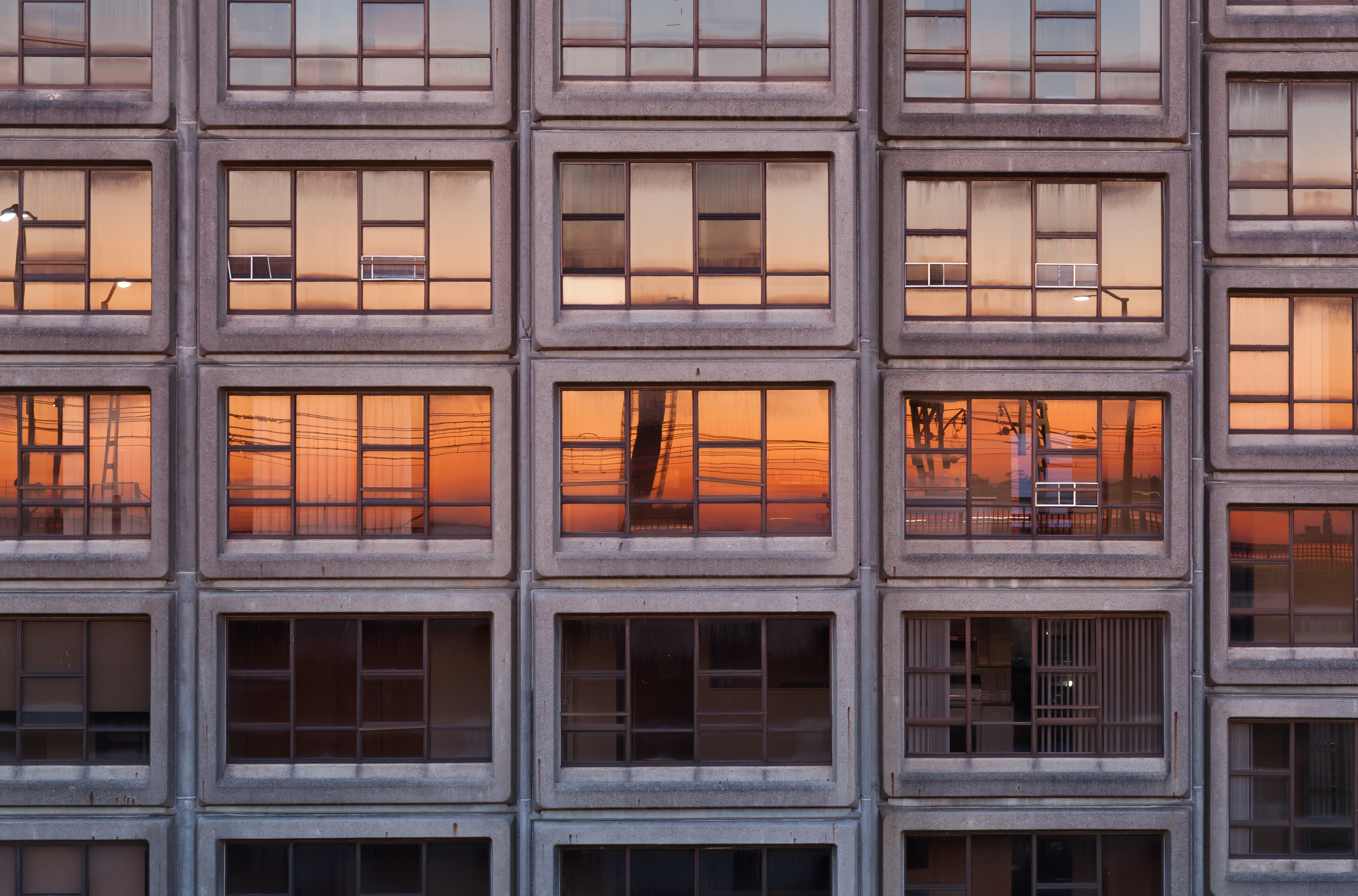
Image of Sirius facade at sunset used on the cover of Dunn, Peake, Piscopo Sirius (2017), Piper Press.

In 2017, SIRIUS the book was released. Written by John Dunn, Ben Peake and Amiera Piscopo, the book documents the story of the building and its residents. Published and reprinted by Piper Press, the cover features an image of the building's facade at sunset by Katherine Lu and images taken by many of the people who were involved in the protests and efforts to save Sirius and its community, with support coordinated under the Save Our Sirius Foundation.

The book won the 2020 Adrian Ashton Prize for Architectural Culture and Literature from the NSW Chapter of the Australian Institute of Architects. SIRIUS was also a Finalist for the National Gallery of Victoria's International Cornish Family Prize for Art and Design Publishing.

== Gallery ==
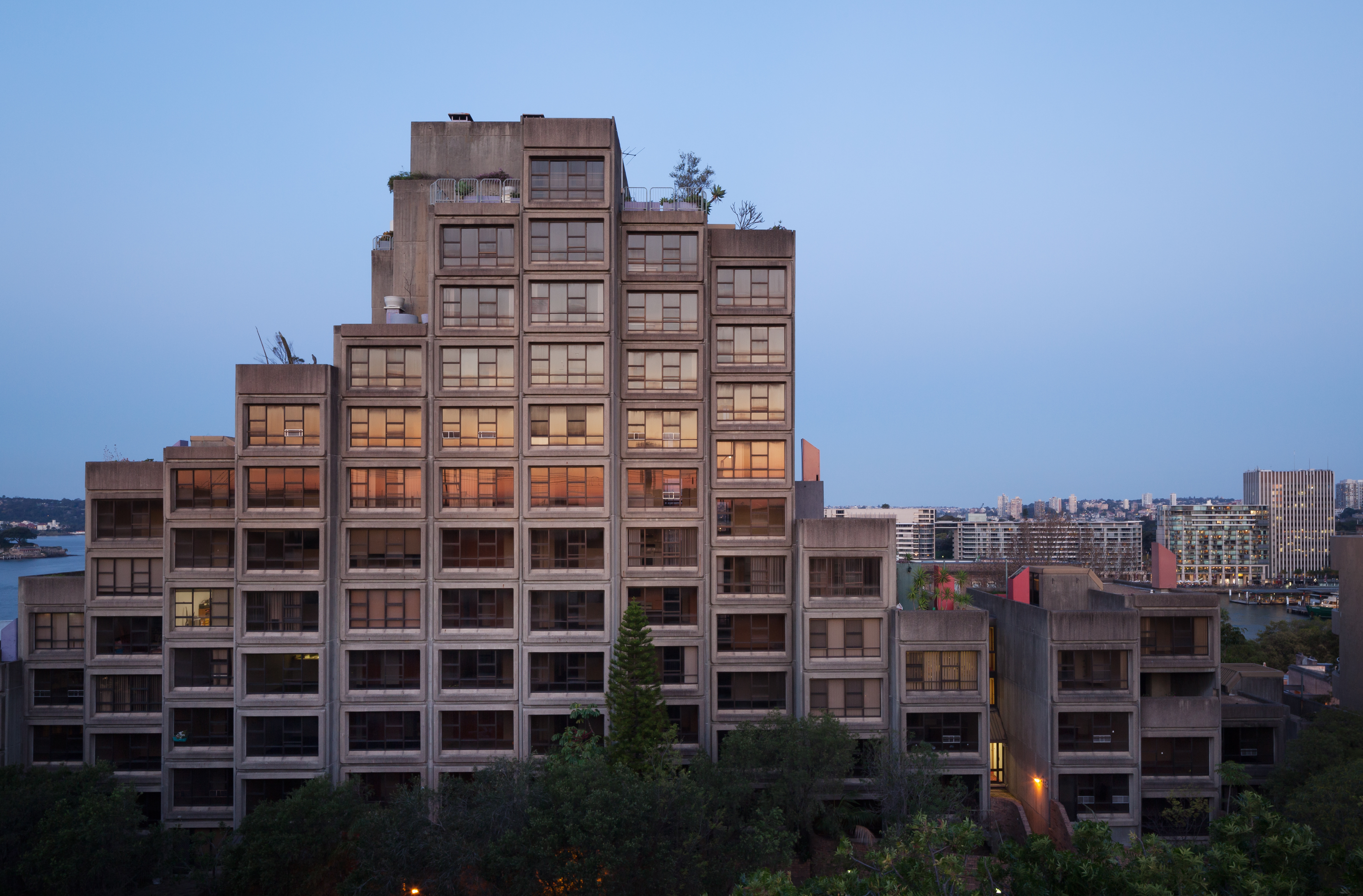
Sirius western elevation viewed from Cumberland St

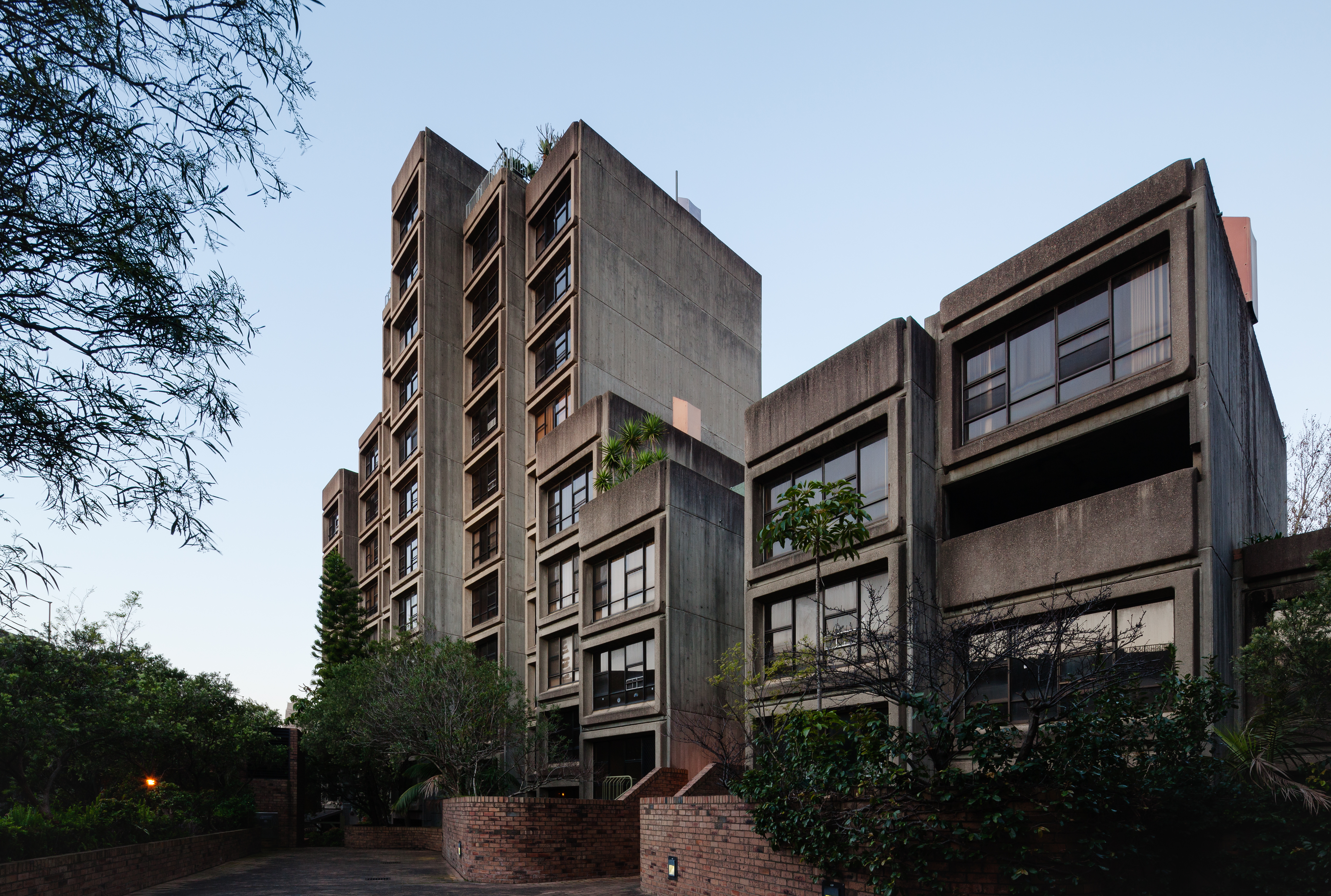
Sirius shared courtyard

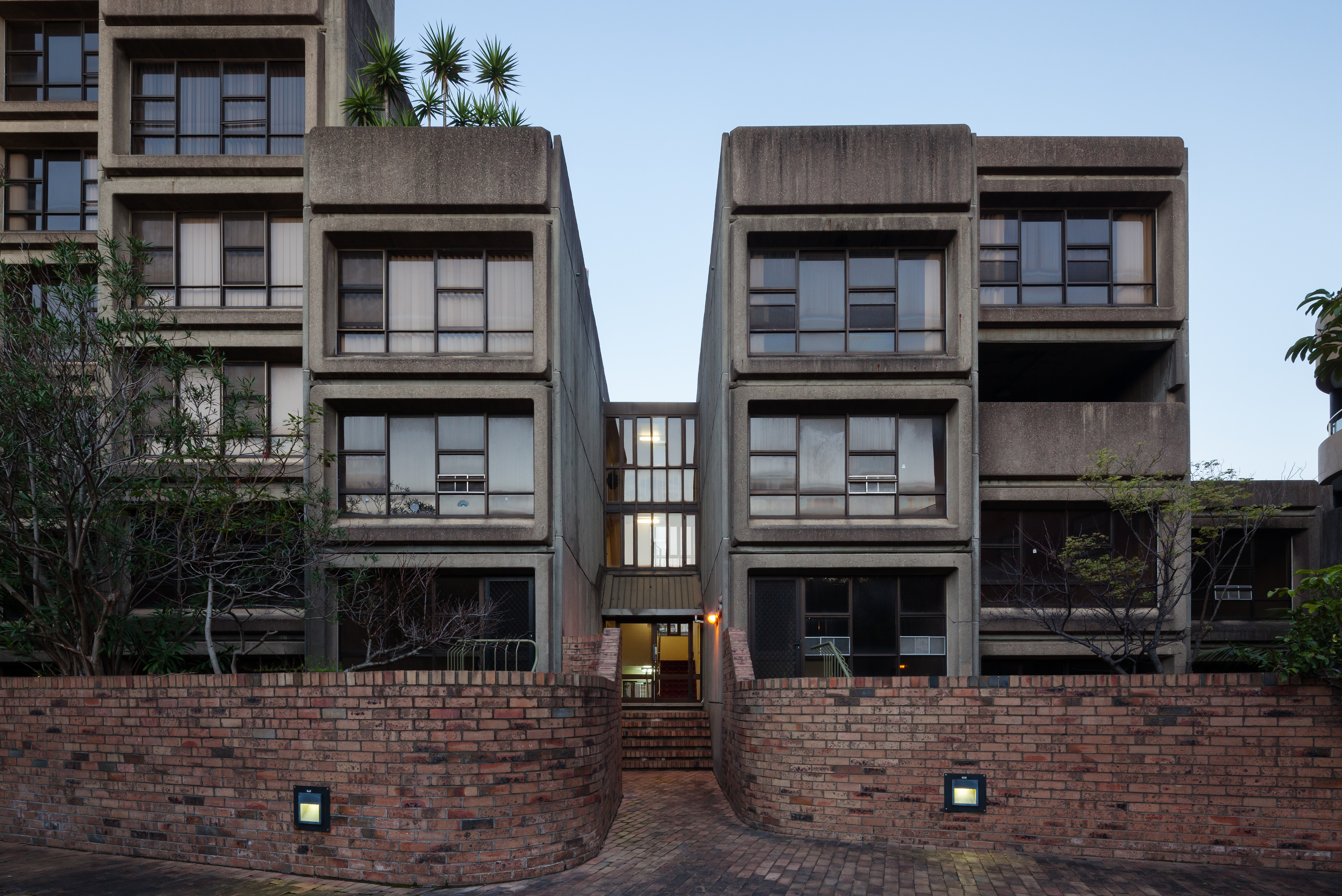
Sirius low rise entry

From Circular Quay

From Avery Terrace

From East

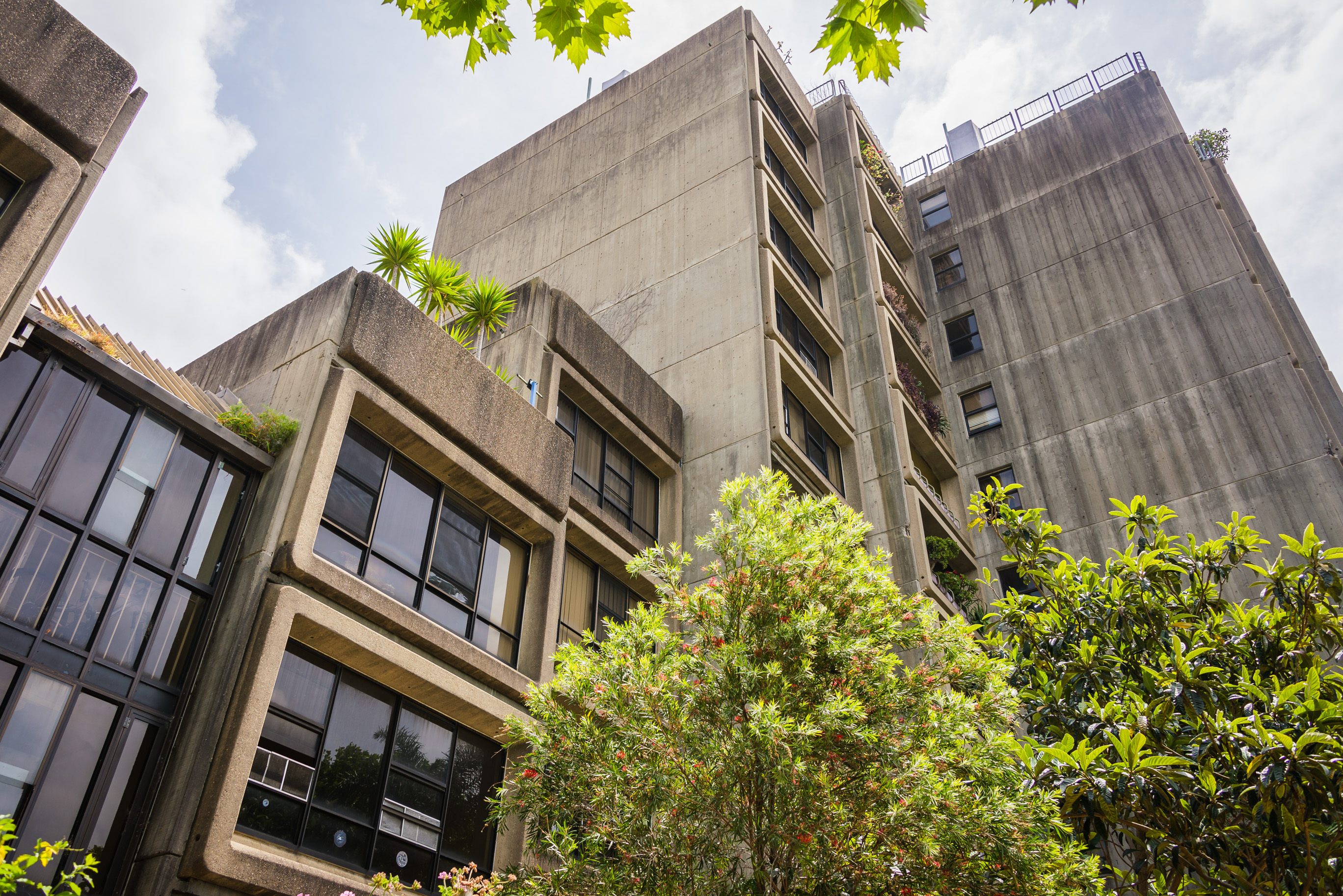

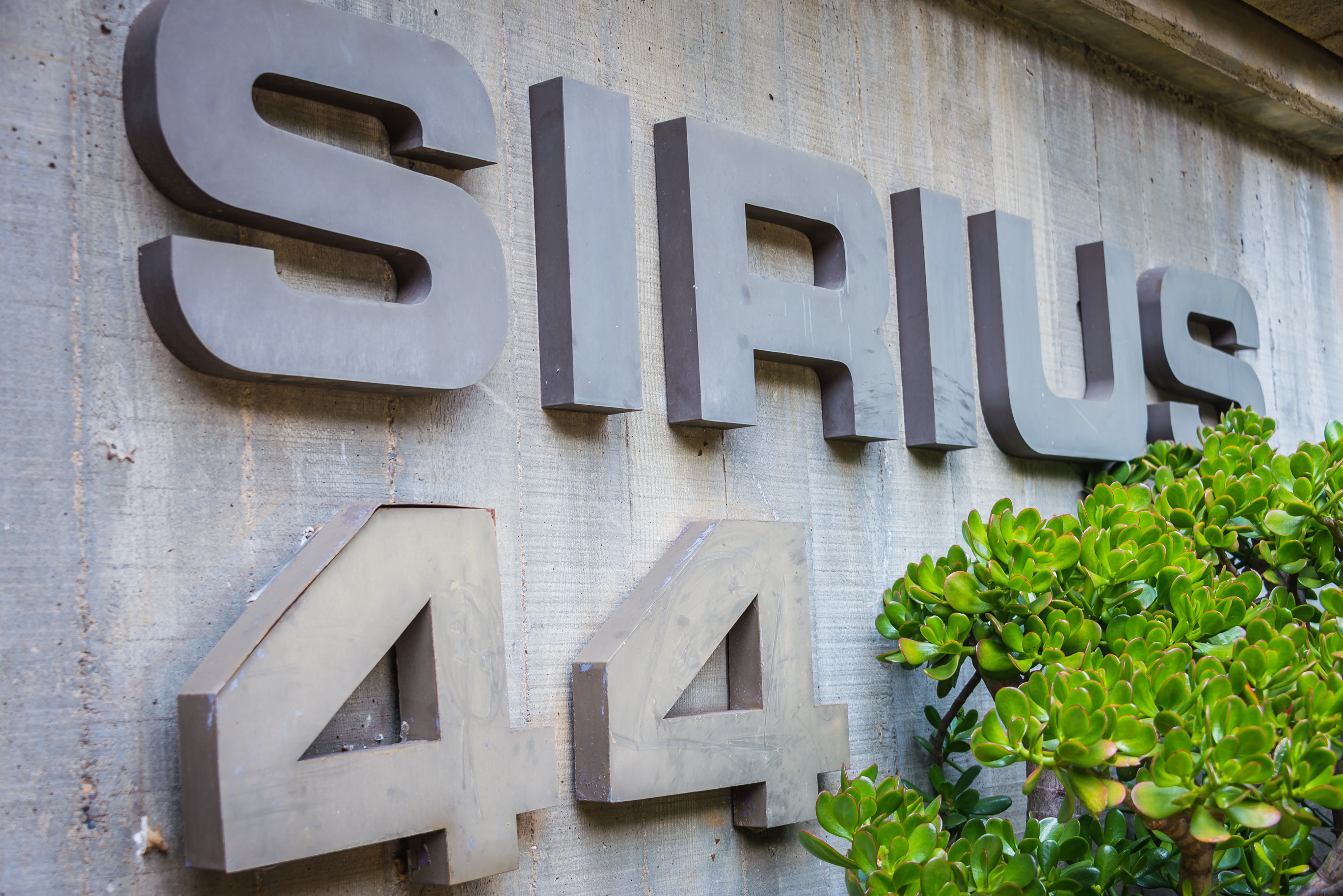
Building signage

== See also ==
- Architecture of Sydney
- Millers Point, New South Wales
- List of brutalist structures
