= City Baths, Melbourne =

Building in Melbourne, Australia

City Baths
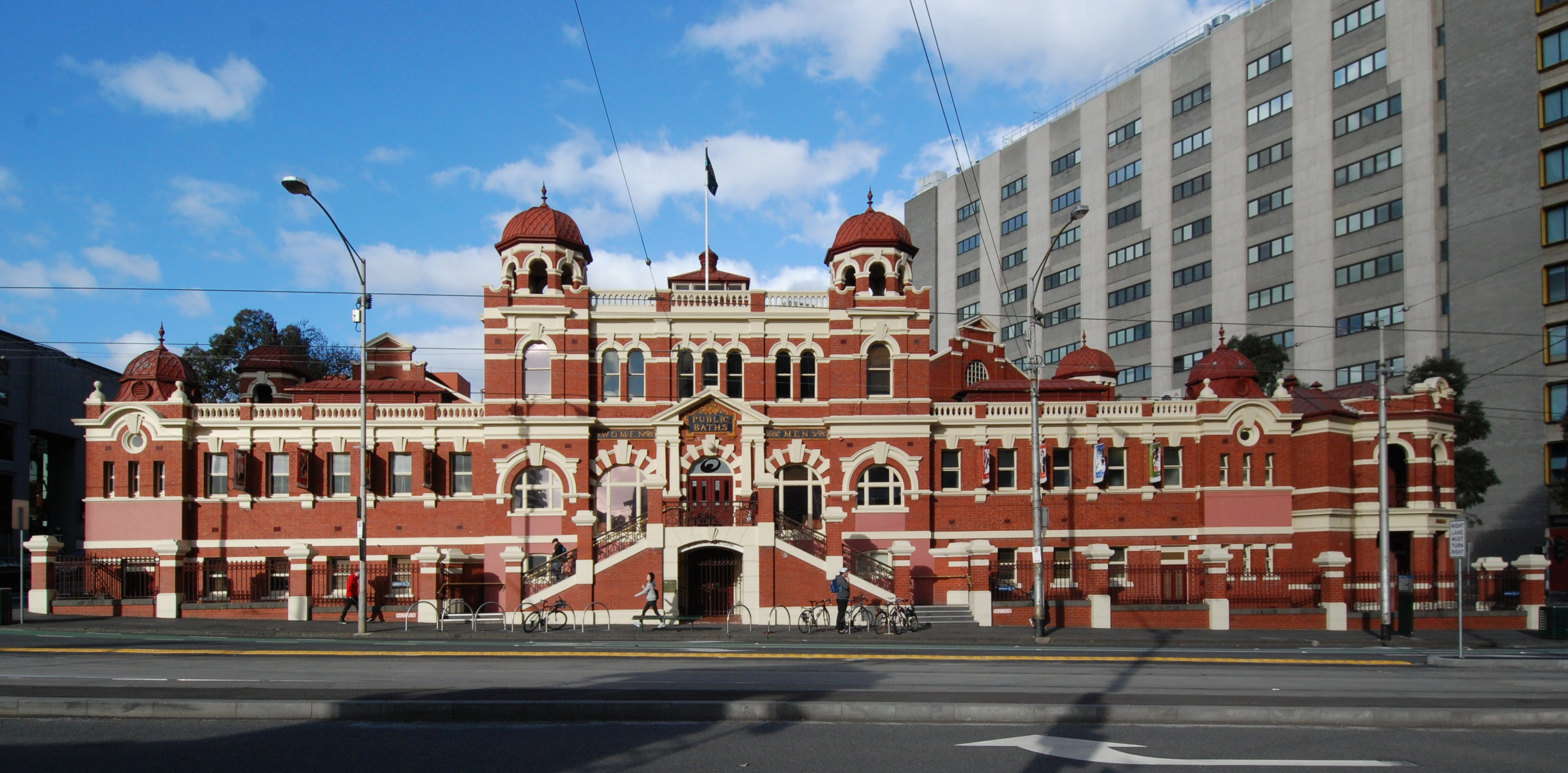

- Location within Melbourne

General information
- Type: Aquatic complex; Public baths
- Architectural style: Edwardian Baroque
- Location: 420 Swanston Street, Melbourne, Victoria, Australia
- Coordinates: 37°48′25″S 144°57′46″E
- Groundbreaking: 1903
- Completed: 23 March 1904; 122 years ago
- Owner: City of Melbourne

Design and construction
- Architects: J. J. Clark & E. J. Clark

Victorian Heritage Register
- Official name: City Baths
- Type: Registered Place
- Designated: 26 March 1980
- Reference no.: H0466
- Heritage overlay no.: HO493
- Category: Recreation and Entertainment

Register of the National Estate
- Official name: City Baths
- Type: Defunct register
- Designated: undated
- Reference no.: 5318

The City Baths is an aquatic complex located at 420 Swanston Street, Melbourne, Victoria, Australia. Opened in 1904 as public baths, with swimming pools and bathing facilities and extensively renovated in the early 1980s, it is now considered one of Melbourne's most architecturally and historically significant buildings.

The baths were added to the Victorian Heritage Register on 26 March 1980 in recognition of their architectural and historical significance; and, on an unknown date, were added to the now defunct Register of the National Estate.

== History ==
The triangular site between Swanston, Victoria and Franklin streets was reserved for a public bath facility in 1850.

Melbourne City Council opened the first City Baths on 9 January 1860, which housed public baths (three years after the opening of the London Baths). The objective was to discourage people from bathing in the Yarra River, which by the 1850s had become quite polluted and the cause of an epidemic of typhoid fever, which hit the city resulting in many deaths. However, people continued to swim and drink the water. The baths were leased to a private operator, but lack of maintenance resulted in such deterioration of the building that the Baths were closed in 1899.

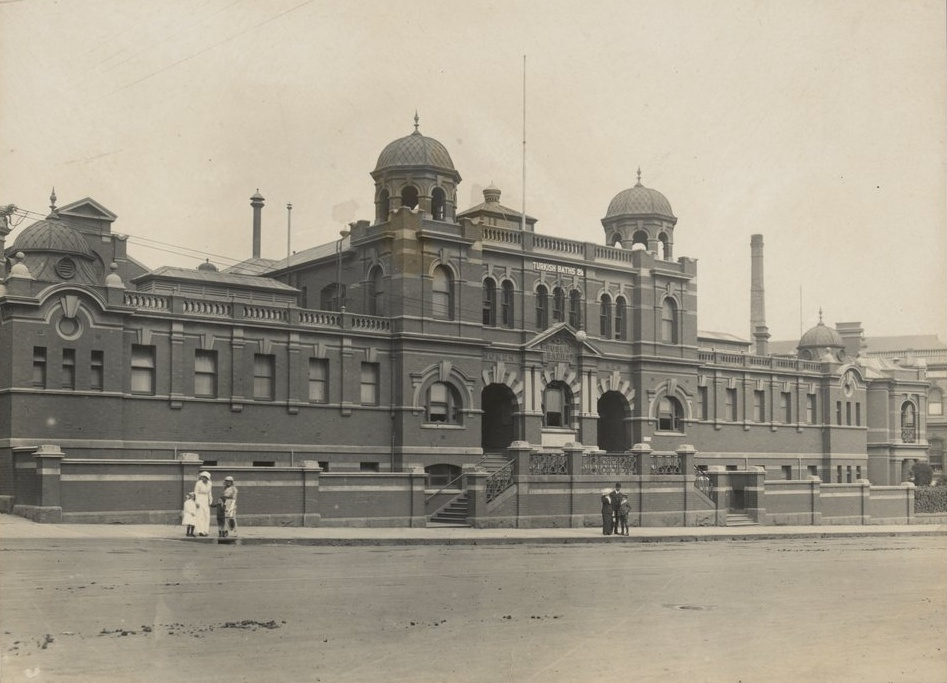
City Baths c. 1914

After a design competition was won by the prolific architect, John James Clark, working in partnership with his son, Edward James Clark, construction of this new building started in 1903, and the bath was opened on 23 March 1904.

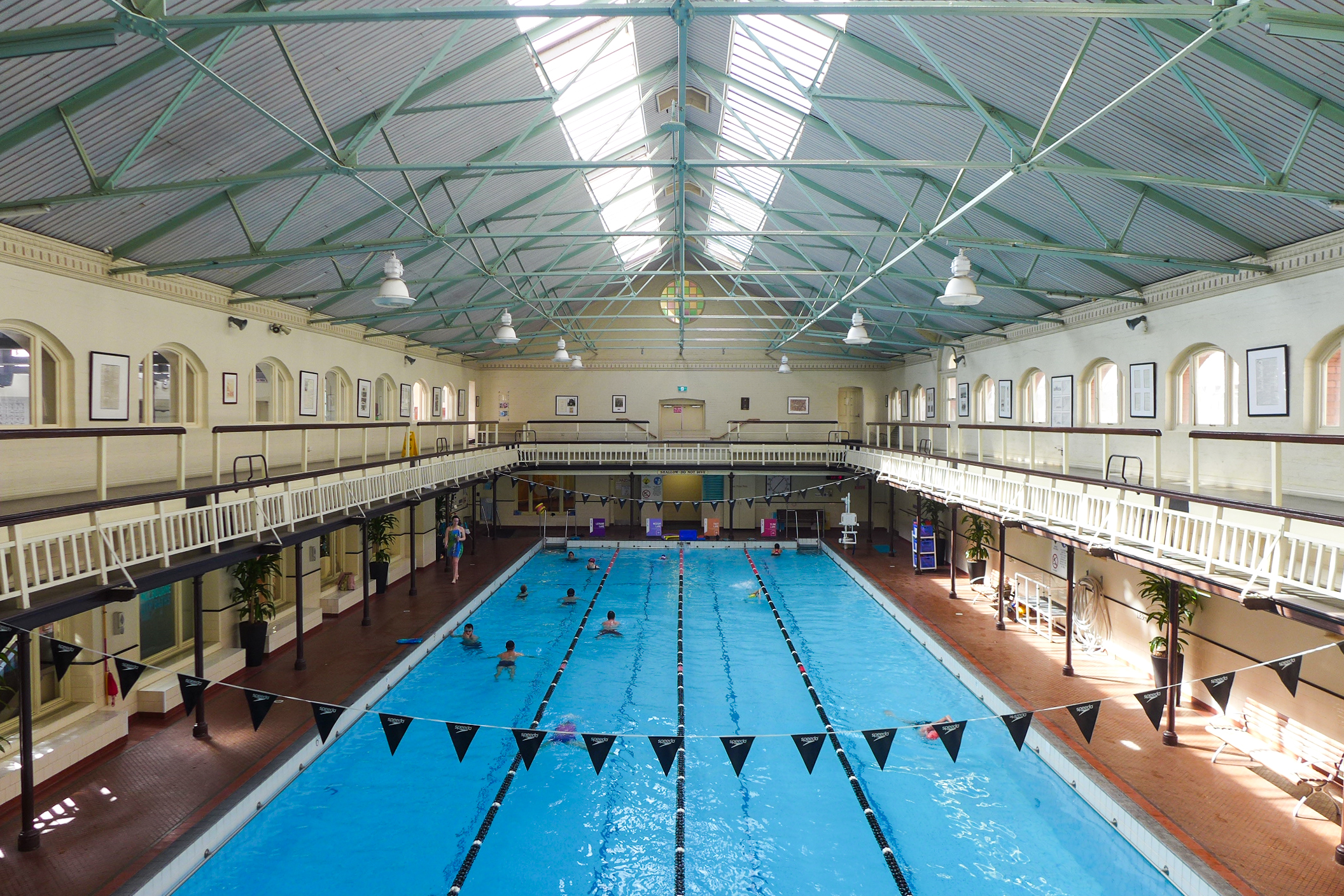
Melbourne City Baths interior

Strict separation of men and women was maintained, with separate pools (the larger 30 m [100 ft] pool was for men, with sixteen slipper baths, six spray baths and a gymnasium), and separate street entrances. Two classes of facilities were provided, with second class cubicles containing slipper baths (where one end is raised and sloped creating a more comfortable lounging position) on ground level, and "first class baths" on the main floor and a mikvah and Victorian-style Turkish baths. The popularity of the swimming pool increased with the introduction of mixed bathing in 1947, and it became the venue for swimming competitions.

After a period of decline and demolition threats in the 1970s, the building was saved by a Builders Labourers Federation green ban. Later being extensively renovated and restored in 1981–83, designed by Kevin Greenhatch with Gunn Williams & Fender. The rear furnace and caretakers cottage were replaced with squash courts and gym space in a matching red brick, the pools were restored though most of the numerous changing booths were removed, most of the bath cubicles replaced with other facilities, and a single entrance stair created. The first class ladies baths with the "mikvah bath" on the first floor were retained as the spa area.

The baths now house two swimming pools, spa, sauna, squash courts and a gymnasium. The mikveh bath was renovated in 2013. To cater for all types of swimmers, the swimming pool is divided into four lanes: an aqua play lane, a medium lane, a fast lane and a slow lane (or aquatic education, when swimming lessons are given).

The City Baths is the largest swimming pool in the city centre of Melbourne.

== Architecture ==
The City Baths is one of the most significant examples of Edwardian civic architecture in Melbourne, combining Edwardian red-brick with rich cream painted Edwardian Baroque elements, in a bold "blood and bandages" palette. The highly articulated facade wraps around the corners of the site, and the roofline is enlivened by multiple cupola-roofed belvederes, the tall pedimented gables of the pool roofs, and roof ridges and vents in red-painted corrugated iron. The three storey central entrance bay incorporates arched openings emphasised by banded voussoirs, and an open pediment on paired pilasters forming the entry, flanked by long two storey wings either side.

== See also ==
- Swimming in Australia
