= Joan Croll =

Australian physician and radiologist (1928–2022)

Joan Croll AO
- Born: Una Joan Holliday; 15 June 1928; Sydney, New South Wales, Australia
- Died: 14 February 2022 (aged 93); Sydney, New South Wales, Australia
- Education: University of Sydney

Una Joan Croll AO (née Holliday; 15 June 1928 – 14 February 2022) was an Australian physician and radiologist who specialised in ultrasound and mammography. Outside medicine, she was an environmental activist, one of the 13 women who saved Kelly's Bush in Sydney.

== Early life and education ==
Una Joan Holliday was born in Sydney, New South Wales, on 15 June 1928. As an undergraduate at the University of Sydney, she competed in rowing. After completing her medical degree in 1952, she briefly worked as a pathologist in the Northern Territory but returned to Sydney afterwards. In 1955, she married Frank James Croll, a fellow medical student who specialized in cardiology, and subsequently spent thirteen years as a full-time mother to her four children, delaying her career in medicine till she was 47 years old.

== Environmental activism ==
In the early 1970s, Croll became one of the 13 women environmental activists known as "The Battlers for Kelly's Bush", who campaigned against urban development into a parcel of native bushland by the Parramatta River in Hunters Hill, a suburb west of Sydney. Their efforts led to the first enforcement of a Green Ban. This successful preservation of Kelly's Bush paved the way for a number of similar Green-Ban actions, impacting land use and redevelopment plans in and around Sydney. With no further real estate developments permitted on site, Kelly's Bush was later purchased by the government to become public open space, to be cared for by local volunteers known as "Friends of Kelly's Bush", with Croll as the inaugural president in 1996. She later remarked that her participation in saving Kelly's Bush as "the most important thing I ever did." In 2021, she attended the 50th anniversary celebrations the year before her death.

== Career in medicine ==
In 1975, Croll was appointed to run Sydney's Breast Health Screening Program, and she became the medical director of the Sydney Square Breast Clinic in 1978. In 1994, she took a position with the Central Sydney Area Health Service, while continuing as consultant radiologist at the Sydney Square Breast Clinic. Over the years, the clinic developed into a prominent teaching centre in radiology, where Croll, as one of Australia's pioneers of mammography, promoted the introduction of breast ultrasound and mammography screening, and helped establish the national breast cancer screening program in Australia.

Croll was appointed an Officer of the Order of Australia in the 1996 Australia Day Honours for "service to medicine, particularly in the fields of mammography and ultrasound". She then retired in 1997.

== Personal life and death ==
Croll was known as a prolific writer of letters to The Sydney Morning Herald. Her letters about the environment and various other issues were regularly published by the newspaper.

Joan and Frank Croll were art collectors and the couple were members of an art-buying syndicate of Australian art connoisseurs and investors. Parts of their collection have been donated to art galleries, including a 1976 portrait of Joan painted by John Brack on display at the National Portrait Gallery in Canberra.

Joan Croll died on 14 February 2022, at the age of 93. Her husband Frank predeceased her in 2003.
