= The Pink Ban =

Industrial action

The Pink Ban was a strike action, taken by the Builders Labourers Federation (BLF), at Macquarie University due to the expulsion of a gay man from student housing.

The Pink Bans were a pivotal movement in Australian history, where labour union activism intersected with gay rights. This movement was primarily catalysed by the New South Wales branch of the Builders Labourers Federation (BLF) in 1973, responding to the expulsion of a gay student, Jeremy Fisher, from Macquarie University, Sydney.

== Background ==
During the early 1970s, Jeremy Fisher, a treasurer of the Gay Liberation club, became a prominent figure in the gay rights movement in Sydney. He joined the movement in 1972 and participated in its political ventures, among which were Zaps – a form of political protest and activism. At the time, Fisher was a linguistics student at Macquarie University, and he resided at Robert Menzies College, an institution administered by the Anglican Church.

Fisher's journey was marked by personal turmoil. He was a victim of rape, and a week following this traumatic event, he attempted suicide by overdosing on antihistamines and cutting both of his arms. Following this incident, he was admitted to Macquarie Hospital, where he faced further challenges. A psychiatric registrar interrogated him about his sexual orientation, referencing Gay Liberation badges found in his dorm room at Menzies College. During the interrogation Jeremy admitted involvement with the Gay Liberation club.

Alan Cole, the Master of Robert Menzies College, refused to allow Jeremy Fisher further residence without Jeremy seeking to change his sexuality, he was also refused a refund on his residential bond. During this difficult period, Fisher penned the poignant line, "Death is nothing but white light" in Overland.

Seeking support, Fisher reached out to influential figures such as Rod Webb, editor of Arena and a member of the Socialist Workers League (SWL), and Jeff Hayler, Chair of The Macquarie Students’ Council (MSC). The MSC, representing the student body of Macquarie University, took a firm stand against the discriminatory practices of Robert Menzies College, calling for its disaffiliation. The Staff Association of the university also condemned the college's actions, aligning with the growing sentiment against discrimination based on sexual orientation. His story gained further attention when the Australian Broadcasting Corporation (ABC) conducted an interview with him.

== The Pink Bans ==
The Builders Labourers Federation, informed of Fisher's expulsion by the Macquarie university Students' Council, voted to stop construction on all new building construction at Macquarie University until Fisher was reinstated. This decision marked a significant moment in the union movement's support for gay rights, with the BLF calling for there to be no discrimination against homosexuals. The BLF, known for supporting various social causes, made a groundbreaking move in standing up for a gay student's rights.

== Wider impact ==
The Pink Bans' influence extended beyond Fisher's case. Later in 1973, Penny Short, a teacher trainee at Macquarie University, had her scholarship revoked for publishing a lesbian poem. The BLF, along with the Teachers Federation, threatened to halt work at Macquarie University in response to the department's refusal to reinstate Short's scholarship, thereby demonstrating the growing alliance between the labour and gay liberation movements in Australia.

== See also ==
- LGBT history in Australia
- Green Ban
