= Bob Pringle (trade unionist) =

Australian trade unionist (1941-1996)

Bob Pringle (11 August 1941 – July 1996) was a left-wing activist and construction worker in the Builders Labourers Federation who was active in left-wing campaigns in the 1960s and 1970s in New South Wales.

Robert Arthur Pringle was born in Toowoomba, Queensland on 11 August 1941.

He helped the green bans, Aboriginal Tent Embassy and protests against the Springboks. He drowned while swimming in 1996. A wake was held in Harold Park Hotel, and his funeral service was held on 7 August 1996.
