= John Cummins (union organiser) =

Australian trade unionist (1948–2006)

John Cummins (1948 – 29 August 2006) was an Australian labour leader. From 1972 onwards, Cummins was involved with the Australian Building Construction Employees and Builders Labourers Federation, better known as the B.L.F.

He was the last Victorian secretary of the BLF, and then became the Federal President of the new "super-union", the CFMEU. (Construction, Forestry, Mining and Energy Union). He was twice jailed for contempt of court after ignoring court orders not to visit his members on building sites.

Cummins had a wife, Diane, and they had two sons, Mick and Shane. He died of cancer following a year of illness.
