= Paul Sharratt =

Australian entertainer, American television producer (1933–2009)

Paul William Sharratt OAM (2 August 1933 – 27 May 2009), was an English-born Australian entertainer and television personality, and later an American television producer.

== Early years ==
Born in Staffordshire, he attended St Chad's School, Wolverhampton, but left without completing his education in order to marry the first of his four wives. This marriage was annulled at the instigation of his parents on the grounds that he had lied about his age and was still a minor. He was subsequently conscripted for two years National Service in the Royal Air Force, serving as an aircraftman at RAF Cranwell.

His interest in fiction, both spoken and in writing, was to remain with him for life, and he began his theatrical career as a stagehand at the Grand Theatre, Wolverhampton. He later joined the British Government's C.S.E. (Combined Services Entertainment), working in Europe, Africa and the Middle East as part of a puppet act.

== Life in Australia ==
Sharratt moved to Australia in 1961.

His company, Starcast Productions, was set up in 1965.

Based on Queensland's Gold Coast for most of the 1970s and 1980s, he was involved in setting up the Tropicarnival.

== Awards and recognition ==
In his television career, he won twelve Logie Awards.

Sharratt was awarded the Medal of the Order of Australia (OAM) in the 1996 Australia Day Honours for "service to the arts, entertainment industry and the community".

== Later career ==
Sharratt moved to Los Angeles and was one of the owners and executive producers at Associated Television International, where he worked at various times with several actors, including Roger Moore, Robert Stack, and Lee Majors.

He died in Los Angeles in 2009 from a heart attack.
