= Madonna Staunton =

Australian artist (1938–2019)

Madonna Pearl Staunton OAM (6 October 1938– 16 December 2019) was an artist and poet who lived in Brisbane. She is known for her works on Australian Modernism.

== Background and career ==
Madonna Staunton was born in Murwillumbah on 6 October 1938 and died in Brisbane in 2019. She was the only child of book trader Albert Errol Staunton (1905-1962), and artist and poet Madge Staunton nee Jones (1917-1985). In 1951 her family moved to Brisbane where Staunton received formal art training from her mother, as well as Roy Churcher, Bronwyn Yeates (Thomas), Nevil Matthews and Jon Molvig.

Staunton is recognised for her contributions to Australian Modernism over five decades. Staunton's earlier work consisted of torn sections of Contemporary Art Society newsletter and magazines. Her art was informed by notably poetry, literature, music and Buddhism and Zen philosophy and culture Illness in 1974, forced Staunton to reconsider her method from large scale paintings to collage. In the 1980s, Staunton showed an interest in assemblage and sculpture, along with a return to painting.

Staunton is known for creating small format collages, using scrap materials and everyday items in her works such as tickets, matchboxes, piano keys, book bindings taken from urban waste and assembled in an abstract format. Her art is noted as having an intense meditative and introspective qualities, reflective of her cultural beliefs.

In the 1996 Australian Day Honours Staunton was awarded the Medal of the Order of Australia (OAM) for "service to the visual arts".

In 2012 Madonna Staunton was interviewed in a digital story and oral history for the State Library of Queensland's James C Sourris AM Collection. In the interview Staunton talks to Professor Robert Leslie Lingard about her art and life, the influences on her art including her childhood, fragile health, and poetry, the various artists and experiences that she has encountered and that which motivates and inspires her.

Staunton died on 16 December 2019. A memorial service was held at the University of Queensland Art Museum, Brisbane.

== Individual exhibitions ==
Year	Exhibition
2014 - 2015	Madonna Staunton: Out of Clear Blue Sky, Queensland Art Gallery, Brisbane
2013	Madonna Staunton: Dream Trolly, grahame galleries + editions, Brisbane
2003	Madonna Staunton retrospective, IMA, Brisbane
1999	Madonna Staunton, Metro Arts, Brisbane
1996	Patience and the Provoked, Net works – Sutton Gallery Melbourne
1995	1-6 Recent Works, Bellas Gallery, Brisbane
1994	Madonna Staunton A Survey 1966–1993, Queensland Art Gallery, Brisbane. Perc Tucker Regional Gallery, Townsville
1994	Madonna Staunton, Bellas Gallery, Brisbane
1993	Paradigms, Sutton Gallery Melbourne
1992	Iconic Images, Bellas Gallery, Brisbane
1991	Recent Works, Gary Anderson Gallery, Sydney
1989	Assemblage Collage, Bellas Gallery, Brisbane
1988	Garry Anderson Gallery, Sydney
1984	Garry Anderson Gallery, Sydney
1983	Ray Hughes Gallery, Brisbane
1980	Ray Hughes Gallery, Brisbane
1979	Institute of Modern Art Brisbane
1978	Ray Hughes Gallery, Brisbane
1977	Ray Hughes Gallery, Brisbane
1976	Ray Hughes Gallery, Brisbane

== Group exhibitions ==
Year	Exhibitions
1996	Mary Place Gallery, Sydney. Organised by Bellas/Sutton Galleries
1996	Reference Points 4, Queensland Art Gallery, Brisbane
1996	Asia-Pacific Hotel Art Fair, Brisbane
1979	European Dialogues, Biennale of Sydney, Art Gallery of New South Wales
