= 1996 Australia Day Honours =

List of Orders and Honours

The 1996 Australia Day Honours are appointments to various orders and honours to recognise and reward good works by Australian citizens. The list was announced on 26 January 1996 by the Governor General of Australia, Bill Hayden.

The Australia Day Honours are the first of the two major annual honours lists, the first announced to coincide with Australia Day (26 January), with the other being the Queen's Birthday Honours, which are announced on the second Monday in June.

== Order of Australia ==
=== Companion (AC) ===
==== General Division ====
Recipient	Citation	Notes
Dr Michael Stockton Keating AO	For service to social, economic and public sector reform, particularly as a leader in organisational and management reform	
Professor Malcolm Ian Logan	For service to education, business and the arts, particularly through raising international awareness of Australian higher education services, and for promoting cooperation between countries	

=== Officer (AO) ===
==== General Division ====
Recipient	Citation	Notes
Richard Wigram Locke Austin, OBE	For service to art and to international relations	
Dr Julie Laraine Cliff	For service to medicine and international relations as a leader in the development of community health services in Mozambique	
Dr Neil Raymond Conn	For service as Under Secretary of the Northern Territory Treasury and to the community	
Dr Joan Croll	For service to medicine, particularly in the fields of mammography and ultrasound	
Dr John Stewart Deeble	For service to community health in the fields of health economics and health insurance policy development	
Albert Coulston Evans, AM	For service to industrial relations	
John Peter Farnham	For service to the Australian music industry and to charitable and community organisations, particularly those relating to youth	
Dr Robert Henry Frater	For service to radio astronomy	
Dr Joseph Gentilli	For service to the study and teaching of geography, particularly in the areas of climatology and immigration studies	
Professor Colin Ivor Johnston	For service to medical research particularly in the areas of heart and kidney disease and to postgraduate medical education.	
Professor Graeme George Kelleher, AM	For service to environmental conservation and sustainability and the development of policy for marine parks.	
Reginald Dawson Livermore	For service to Australian theatre and drama as a performer, writer and director, and to the community	
Dr Stanley William McCarthy	For service to medicine, particularly in the field of cancer pathology	
Professor Paul John Nestel	For service to medicine, particularly in the field of research into heart disease and its prevention	
Douglas John Scott	For service to aeronautical engineering safety and performance and to international relations	
Thomas Anthony Sherman	For public service, particularly in the area of Australia law enforcement	
Emeritus Professor Richard Limon Stanton	For service to economic geology and geological research	
His Excellency The Honourable Michael Carter Tate	For service to the Australian Parliament and the community	
Professor the Honourable Evan Herbert Walker	For service to architecture, town planning and the Victorian Parliament	

==== Military Division ====
Branch	Recipient	Citation	Notes
Army	Major General Stephen Newman Gower, AM	For distinguished service to the Australian Defence Force, in Logistics and Personnel appointments and to the Army as General Officer Commanding, Training Command	
Army	Major General Francis John Hickling	For distinguished service to the Army and Australian Defence Force in the field of military training	
Air Force	Air Vice Marshal Brendan Donald O'Loghlin	For distinguished service to the Royal Australian Air Force as Air Officer Commanding, Training Command	

=== Member (AM) ===
==== General Division ====
Recipient	Citation	Notes
Associate Professor James William Baker	For service to medicine, particularly in the field of obstetrics and gynaecology	
Keith William Barnes	For service to Rugby League as a player and administrator	
Donald Reginald Blew	For service to the community, Australian Rules Football and swimming	
Ailsa Gray Bond	For service to women, particularly through the Country Women's Association	
William Napier Bonthrone, MBE	For service to the rural community, particularly through the United Grazier's Association of Queensland	
Professor Anne Elizabeth Boyd	For service as a composer and educator	
Dr Peter Brine	For service to medicine, particularly in the fields of paediatric anaesthesia and paediatric intensive care	
Timothy Burstall	For service to the Australian Film Industry as a producer, director and writer	
Stanislaus Anthony Carroll	For service to the community, particularly through the Mercy Life Centre and Compassionate Friends	
Richard McKenzie Charlton	For service to the petroleum industry and the community	
Janet Mary Conrad	For service to landscape architecture, education and international relations	
Richard John William d'Apice	For service to conservation and the environment and to the community	
The Honourable Dr Bruce Charles Eastick	For service to the South Australian Parliament, local government and the community	
Frederick Royce Edwards	For service to community health, particularly through the Australian Health Insurance Association	
Emeritus Professor Christie Jayaratnam Eliezer	For service to the Tamil community in Australia	
Dr George Durward Fielding	For service to medicine, particularly as a surgeon	
Sister Anne Marie Gardiner	For service to Aboriginal education and cultural development	
Eileen Mary Glass	For service to people with intellectual disabilities and their families, particularly through L'Arche in Australia	
Cuthbert Oswald Harry, OBE	For service to the community, particularly the welfare of veterans	
Mussolini Bangkiringu Harvey	For service to the Aboriginal community, particularly in the Northern Territory	
Stephen Phillip Haynes	For service to sport, particularly through the detection and prevention of abuse of illegal substances	
Moya Patricia Henderson	For service to music, particularly as a composer	
Professor Jennifer Ann James	For service to nurse education	
Eileen Jerga	For service to social welfare, particularly in relation to defence force families	
Henrietta Kaye	For service to the marine conservation movement particularly through project Jonah	
The Reverend Father Clement Bernard Kilby	For service to the community, particularly through Centacare family services	
Dr Kenneth Wilson Knight	For service to education, public administration and the Archives Authority of New South Wales	
Henry Krongold, CBE	For service to the community, particularly through the promotion of education, the arts, medical research and social welfare	
Jennifer Catherine Learmont	For service to community health in the fields of transfusion-transmitted infections and advocacy for the treatment of obsessive compulsive disorders	
Dr Richard Albert Letts	For service to music as an administrator and consultant	
Valerie Anne Lhuede	For service to conservation, particularly through the restoration and preservation of Yerranderie Historical Mining Village	
The Honourable Margaret Lusink	For service to the law through the Family Court of Australia, and to the community	
Michael Patrick Thomas Lynagh	For service to rugby union football	
Charles Reginald Lyne	For service to surf-lifesaving	
Ian Maclean	For service to the inauguration of the system of Australian Archives and to the development of the archival profession	
Dr David Field Mahoney	For service to veterinary science, particularly research into and the development of vaccines against serious cattle disease	
Alan John Matheson	For service to ethnic affairs, particularly in the field of industrial relations	
Erich Anton Mayer	For service to the business community and to youth, particularly through reforms in education and training programmes	
James Harold McCalman	For service to local government and to the New South Wales electricity distribution industry	
Dr Kenneth Comninos Michael	For public service and engineering, particularly through the maintenance and expansion of the main road network	
Irene Mills	For service to the advancement of health care services in the rural sector of Western Australia	
John Neville Morphett	For service to architecture, business and commerce, and the community	
John Edwin Neary, OBE	For service to the entertainment industry and the Talent Development Project	
Professor Ronald Kim Oates	For service to medicine, particularly in the field of paediatrics, and the welfare of children	
Commander Michael Avison Parker, CVO, RN (Ret'd)	For service to education, particularly through the Plain English Speaking Award Scheme, and to the community	
Professor Clive Brownley Pascoe	For service to contemporary music education	
Joan Burton Paton	For service to ornithology, education and the environment	
Anne Piaszczyk	For service to nursing, particularly in the field of oncology	
James William Riggs	For service to mental health, particularly through the Richmond Fellowship	
Mary Seah	For humanitarian and courageous service to Australian POWs incarcerated in Changi	
Robert James Searls	For service to medical research and administration, particularly through Prince Henry's Medical Research Centre, and to the mining industry	
Elsa Kay Sharp	For service to education, particularly in the field of vocational training	
Dr Peter Roger Shergold	For public service	
Keith Courtney Singh	For service to business and the community	
Dr Dale Spender	For service to the community as a writer and researcher in the field of equality of opportunity and equal status for women	
Deane Frederick Stahmann	For service to the development of the pecan nut industry and research into biological pest control	
Harold James Sternbeck	For service to conservation through the Hunter Valley Conservation Trust, and to local government	
Joyce Stevens	For service to social justice for women as an activist and writer	
John Colin Sweetman	For service to the tourism and hospitality industries, particularly in relation to education and training	
Edward Franklin Thomas	For service to the performing arts, particularly the development of Australian-made television programmes, and to the community	
Marelle Ann Thornton	For service to people with disabilities, particularly through the Spastic Centre of New South Wales	
Wyndham Treasure	For service to yachting, particularly the promotion and marketing of Australian yachting	
Percy James Trezise	For service to the preservation and interpretation of Aboriginal rock art and the study of prehistory and archaeology	
Professor Lance Thomas Twomey	For service to education, particularly in the field of physiotherapy	
Frank Burdon (Don) Webb	For service to medicine, particularly in the field of orthopaedic surgery, and to St John Ambulance in Western Australia	
Peter William Weissam	For service to the arts	
Charles Frank Westrip	For service to arts administration and the building industry	
Marjorie Georgina Joan Williams	For service to the community as a writer, particularly in the areas of peace, social equality and protection of the environment	
Beryl Muriel Wiltshire	For service in the field of social welfare	
Dr Peter Hon Jung Wong	For service to the Chinese community	
Gwenda Merle Zietsch	For service to youth	

==== Military Division ====
Branch	Recipient	Citation	Notes
Navy	Chief Petty Officer Anthony John Crocker	For service to the Royal Australian Navy, particularly as the Chief Naval Stores sailor at HMAS Platypus	
Navy	Commodore Michael Hutton Dowsett	For service to the Royal Australian Navy, particularly in the field of Naval Health Services	
Navy	Principal Chaplain Michael Thomas Holz	For exceptional service to duty and dedication to the Royal Australian Navy and chaplaincy	
Army	Brigadier Ian James Bryant	For service to the Australian Defence Force and through involvement with the ADF's Operational Role in Northern Australia	
Army	Colonel Roger James Dace	For service to Defence and to the Australian Defence Force in the field of acquisition and Logistics	
Army	Brigadier Gregory Howard Garde	For exceptional service to the Army Reserve	
Army	Brigadier Roger Anthony Powell	For exceptional service as Director of Military Education and Training at the Australian Defence Force Academy and as Commander of the 6th Brigade	
Army	Lieutenant Colonel Mark Peter Sampson	For exceptional service to the Army Reserve in the field of operations	
Army	Colonel Robert Alexander Simpson	For exceptional service to the Army and, in particular, as the Senior Medical Officer, 2nd Division	
Army	Lieutenant Colonel Alan John Sparks BEM	For exceptional service to the Army as the Chief Instructor of the Warrant Officer and Non Commissioned Officer Wing at the Land Warfare Centre	
Army	Lieutenant Colonel Rowan John Tink	For exceptional service to the Army in the field of Regional Force Surveillance	
Air Force	Warrant Officer Leslie Albert Bailey	For service to the Royal Australian Air Force in the field of aircraft logistics engineering	
Air Force	Group Captain Garry Freemantle Bates	For service to the Royal Australian Air Force in the field of resource management	
Air Force	Group Captain James Roderick Cole	For service to the Royal Australian Air Force as Commanding Officer No 34 Squadron	
Air Force	Warrant Officer Richard Newton	For exceptional service as Warrant Officer of the Royal Australian Air Force	

=== Medal (OAM) ===
==== General Division ====
Recipient	Citation	Notes
Alan Bertram Alder	For services to the community, particularly through the State Emergency Service	
Dr James Alexander, VRD	For services to youth, particularly through the scouting movement	
Enid May Angell	For service to the community	
Arthur Vey Angove	For service to the local government and the community	
Walter Bruce Annabel	For service to the newspaper industry, particularly as the editor of the Bega District news and to the community	
Herbert Hector Ashby, DCM	For service to the welfare of veterans	
Judith Marjory Ashton	For service to the Australian tourism industry	
Phyllis Evelyn Ashton	For service to the entertainment industry and charitable organisations	
Douglas Joseph Ashton	For service to the entertainment industry and charitable organisations	
Walter Howard Ashton	For service to horology	
Stephen Gordon Ballard	For service to children with disabilities, particularly through the provision of respite care services	
Elsie May Ballard	For service to children with disabilities, particularly through the provision of respite care services	
Nina Gertrude Barden-Hoffman	For service to the support and promotion of charitable organisations, particularly as a journalist.	
Harrie Sylvia Todds Barrett	For service to the community, particularly as a benefactor and supporter of charitable organisations	
Allan Beahan	For service to the community	
Conrad Geiger Beard	For service to the community through benevolent organisations	
Ralph Beckingham	For service to sailing and the Olympic movement, particularly through sports administration	
Walter Bedwell	For service to the community, particularly through the entertainment of veterans and the aged	
Doreen Daisy Bent	For service to the community	
George Tasman Benwell	For service to the community, particularly through the Westernport Safety Council	
Betty Joy Beohm	For service to the community, particularly to ex-servicemen and women	
Desmond Norman Bethke	For service to the community and local government	
James Harold Bettess	For service to the community and local government	
Phillip John Blakey	For service to youth, particularly as State Co-ordinator of 'Bridging the Gap', a job help program	
Kenneth Roy Hilton Blanch	For service to journalism	
Alan Michael Blow	For service to the arts, particularly through the Tasmanian Museum, Art Gallery and the Salamanca Arts Centre Inc	
Frederick Mervyn Bond	For service to local government and sport, particularly Leisure Australia	
Pamela Kay Borthwick	For service to the community and youth, particularly as a school councillor	
Wilma Alice Bowman	For service to social welfare and disabilities services	
Mary Therese Bowsher	For service to people with intellectual disabilities and their families	
Helen Brown	For service to nursing and veterans, particularly in the area of aged and extended care	
Wesley Edward Browne	For service to the community, particularly through ex-service welfare	
Dr Francis Harding Burns	For service to medicine in the area of diabetes care and in the prevention of drug and alcohol abuse	
Jennifer Lorraine Butt	For service to the community through the Rural Drought Relief for Women and Children Programme	
Commissioner Alistair Grant Cairns	For service to the community, particularly through the Salvation Army	
Robert Bruce Cameron	For service to vocational education and training, particularly in the automotive trades and the community	
The Reverend John Colin Campbell	For service to the Baptist Church of NSW and the community	
Tonya Roxanne Carew	For service to children, particularly through Protect All Children Today and the Pony club movement	
Irene Case	For service to the Scleroderma Association of New South Wales	
Jeffrey Alan Cheales	For service to the sport, particularly as a judge, coach and administrator	
Alan Henry Clark	For service to veterans, particularly the Australian Federation of Totally and Permanently Incapacitated ex-service personnel	
Beryl Adeline Conn	For service to the community, particularly the Caulfield Medical Centre Auxiliary	
Ellen Cook	For service to the Scout Association of Australia	
Wing Commander Geoffrey Laurence Cottee, RFD	For service to youth through the Air Training Corps	
Elisabeth Claire Cruden	For service to people with hearing disabilities, particularly through Better Hearing Australia	
Kingsley Grant Culley	For service to the water and waste water industry and the community	
Beverley Joan Davies	For service to the community	
Gordon Edwin Davison	For service to the Scout Association of Australia	
Emils Delins	For service to the Latvian community	
Lola Clair Downes	For service to sport, particularly track and field athletics	
Henryk Jan Duszynski	For service to the 'Tatry' Polish Folklore Ensemble	
Joseph Zev Eisenberg	For service to the arts, particularly as Director of the New England Regional Art Museum	
Cecil Charles Etwell	For service to the community through the Mackay Show Association	
Mavis Isabel Fagan	For service to the Alzheimer's Association of Tasmania	
Professor Kevin Stanley Fagg	For service to the development of business and management studies at Central Queensland University	
Nancy Margaret Falloon	For service to the Girl Guides Association of Australia and to the community	
Joan Heather Fisher	For service to the Nature Conservation Society of South Australia	
Sister Josephine Fitzpatrick	For service to education, particularly as Principle of the Sacred Heart School at Cunnamulla	
Joseph Leonard Forace	For service to the Maltese community	
Arnold Henry Scott Foster	For service to the community and to ballroom and old time dancing	
John Richard Francis	For service to the community	
Rodney Frank	For service to the community	
John Robert Franklin	For service to the Australian Air League	
Joan Gwenneth Freeman	For service to the community	
Jeannette Isobel Fuller	For service to the community, particularly through providing support and care for the aged	
Margaret Joyce Gaylard	For service to community health, particularly through providing support for the needs and care of the aged and the disadvantaged	
Draga Gelt	For service to the Slovenian community	
Mollie Isabella Gibson	For service to the community	
Helen Margaret Gifford	For service to music as a composer	
Trevor MacDonald Gifford	For service to the Volunteer Sea Search and Rescue Association of Western Australia and the Marine Rescue Association of Australia	
Edward Frank Godfrey	For service to the blue nursing service.	
Shirley Beatrice Gollings	For service to early childhood education.	
Alan Leslie Gordon	For service to veterans, particularly through the Holbrook Sub-Branch and Club of the Returned and Services League	
Zbigniew Grabczewski	For service to the Polish community and the taxi industry	
Aileen May Griffiths	For service to the community	
Helen Lurline Griffiths	For service to the community as an advocate for those affected by cystic fibrosis	
John Charles Griffiths	For service to youth, particularly through the Victorian branch of the Scout Association, and to the community	
Meredith Griggs	For service to early childhood education, particularly through KU Children's Services	
Mietka Irena Gruszka	For service to the Polish community and multicultural organisations	
Dr Roger Kingsley Hall	For service to paediatric dentistry	
Stewart James Harley	For service to aged people, particularly through Aged Care Tasmania	
Beverley Elizabeth Harris	For service to netball	
Neil John Harris	For service to the community, particularly through Lions Clubs International	
Charlotte Annie Hastie	For service to rural women, particularly through the Country Women's Association	
Dr Mileham Geoffrey Hayes	For service to jazz as a player, promoter and administrator	
Bryan Charles Hazell	For service to cricket as a player and administrator	
David John Clifford Heath	For service to veterans, particularly through the Naval Association, the Naval Club and the Naval Reserve Cadet Movement	
Sister Yvonne Anne Heffernan	For service to the well-being of prisoners and their families, and to homeless men through the Matthew Talbot Hostel	
Neville Joseph Henshaw	For service to surf-lifesaving at club state and national levels.	
Joseph John Hepinstall	For service to the Adelaide and suburban cricket association and wildlife conservation.	
Mildred Elizabeth Higgins	For service to the community.	
Kathleen Elsie Holmes	For service to the community health, particularly through the Glaucoma Foundation of Australia.	
The Reverend Ronald Victor Holt	For service the community through the Uniting Church in Australia	
Captain Donald Arthur Hopper	For service to maritime safety and rescue communications	
Michael Matthew Howlin	For service to veterans, particularly as treasurer of the Cabravale Ex-active Servicemen's Club.	
Patricia Delsey Ingham	For service to aged people through the League of Help for the elderly and to the Women's Royal Australian Naval Service.	
Trevor Huntley Jacobs	For service to the community.	
Shirley Anne James	For service to people with intellectual disabilities, particularly through Eurella Community Services.	
David Phillip John	For service to local government.	
Bette Jones	For service in support of the Country Fire Authority as a radio operator and to the community.	
Emeritus Professor Peter Numa Joubert	For service to road and offshore yachting safety	
Constantine George Kailis	For service to the Greek community.	
Philia Kambitsis	For service to the Greek community, particularly to aged people.	
The Reverend William Duncan Kennedy	For service to the community as a hospital chaplain	
Margaret Dawn Kidney	For service to the community particularly through the Offenders and Rehabilitation Services Auxiliary and through the Anglican Church.	
Jack Lindsay Kile	For service to local government and to the community.	
John Maxwell Knowles	For service to the community, particularly through the Lions Club International	
Irene Krastev	For service to multicultural groups, the Bulgarian community, and to the aged	
Zbigniew Tadeusz Sykstus Kwiecinski	For service to veterans	
Jacqueline Ann Lambert	For service to Aboriginal studies through the Australian Institute of Aboriginal and Torres Strait Island Studies	
Margaret Yvonne Lamond	For service to education as a teacher and advocate in the field of hearing impairment	
Marion Sau Foong Lau	For service to the Chinese community, and aged people	
Patrick Victor Lewis	For service to veterans, particularly through the Australian Legion of Ex-Servicemen and Women	
Bruce Livingstone	For service to the Motor Trades Association and related organisations in the Australian Capital Territory	
Paul John Mackett	For service to Aboriginal and Torres Strait Islander family history research	
Gloria Dawn Mansfield	For service to primary industry, particularly through the Cattlemen's Union of Australia	
Stanley Marsh	For service to local government and the community	
Barbara Mason	For service to community health organisations	
Alice Mary Mayall	For service to the community	
Heather Maureen McCabe	For service to music, particularly as musical director of the Bundaberg Symphony Orchestra	
James Ian McCoy	For service to the community	
Grace Thelma McDonald	For service to netball	
Winifred McDonell	For service to education, particularly in the field of mathematics	
Euphemia Stirling McDougall	For service to women's hockey	
Margaret Ellen McEntee	For service to women, particularly through the Catholic Women's League of Australia	
Thomas James McKean	For service to the community, particularly through the Lone Parents’ Support Service and the Corio Rotary Club	
William John McLennan	For service to the community, particularly through the Society of St Vincent de Paul and senior citizens groups	
Shirley June Meldrum	For service to the community	
Dr Olga Henrietta Mendis	For service to the Sinhalese community	
Henri Marie Joseph Meyer	For service to the trade union movement	
Alois Mikula	For service to the Scout Association of Australia, and veterans	
Peter Irvine Mitchell	For service to soccer administration	
Patricia Mitchell	For service to rural education and the arts	
Janet Moody	For service to the performing arts, particularly through the St Luke's Little Theatre Society	
Peter Edward Morriss	For service to the design and engraving of postage stamps and the engraving and development of banknotes	
Joseph Masie Mosby	For service to the community of the Torres Strait Islands	
Albert Moseley	For service to surf lifesaving	
Michael Joseph Moy	For service to the community, particularly the aged and people with disabilities, and as an administrator of horse racing	
Jeannine Seraphie Neumann	For service to the community through the Gold Coast Welfare Association	
Leslie Patrick Gilwell Newman	For service to ballroom dancing	
Lila Mary Notley	For service to the community, particularly through Life Education Centres	
Ilga Nyirady	For service to the Latvian community	
Kelvin Mahon O'Connell	For service to local government, primary industry and veterans	
Patricia Marie O'Hara	For service to people with hearing impairment	
Muriel Oehlman	For service to veterans, particularly through the Southport Sub-Branch of the Returned and Services League of Australia	
Douglas Orson Oldfield	For service to education through the Wesley College Council, and to the community	
Alexander Overett	For service to business and commerce, particularly through the Auctineers and Agents Committee	
Ruth Padgett	For service to the community through the Neighbourhood Watch Scheme	
Graeme Alston Park	For service to youth through the Scouting movement	
Anthony Joseph Parker	For service to accountancy, and the community	
Rob Parrella	For service to sport, particularly lawn bowls	
Nancy Hearne Paton	For service to the sugar industry	
Robert George Phillips	For service to local government through the Clare District Council	
Air Commodore Edward Thomas Pickerd, OBE, DFC, (Ret'd)	For service to youth through the Duke of Edinburgh's Award Scheme.	
Louis David Platus	For service to sports administration through Maccabi Australia	
Ian Stuart Armitage Power	For service to veterans, particularly through the Central Queensland district branch of the Returned and Services League of Australia	
Malcolm Rabe	For service to the community	
William Race	For service to veterans through the Sunnybank sub-branch of the Returned and Services League of Australia	
Hermine Rose Raup	For service to the German/Austrian community	
Linda Louise Lewis Reaby	For service to community health, particularly in the promotion of breast cancer awareness and research	
Hilton James Redding	For service to radio broadcasting	
Dr Beryl May Rich	For service to medicine, particularly in the areas of Aboriginal health and maternal and baby health	
Ronald Robert Rich	For service to the community, particularly as chairman of Dubbo Base Hospital	
Bruce Rindfleish	For service to local government and the community	
Charles Robertson	For service to local government, the aged, and sports administration	
Major Aylmer Campbell Robertson	For service to the community, particularly through the Toowoomba Art Gallery and the Toowoomba Chamber of Commerce	
Ian Rogers	For service to chess	
Norman John Rowland	For service to the aged through the Mount Warrigal Retirement Village	
Gustaf Frithiof Ryberg	For service to the community	
Allan William Sansom	For service to the community	
Mavis Olwin Sansom	For service to the community	
Kenneth William Scarlett	For service to the arts, particularly in the promotion of Australian sculpture	
Frederick Edmund Schipke	For service to the community through the teaching of music and as a musician	
Marjory Hannah Meredith Scurlock	For service to the community, particularly through the Anglican Church and the Western Australian Branch of the National Council for Women	
Gwen Secomb	For service to education through the South Australian Association of School Parents Clubs Inc	
Marian Nell Shand	For service to conservation through the May Gibbs Foundation and the Nutcote Trust	
Dr William Neil Shand	For service to conservation through the May Gibbs Foundation and the Nutcote Trust	
Paul William Sharratt	For service to the arts, entertainment industry and the community	
Reginald Leslie Shelswell	For service to junior cricket and rugby league football	
Dorothy Ida Shepherdson	For service to the community	
The Reverend Reginald Jack Skippen	For service to the community through the Blue Nursing Service	
Roy Frederick Smalley	For service to tennis	
Arthur James Smith	For service to veterans.	
Harold Gordon Solomon	For service to veterans, particularly merchant mariners	
Henry Edward Spicer	For service to the community, particularly through Lions International	
George Raymond Spindler	For service to veterans and the community through the Returned and Services League	
Margaret Louise Staas	For service to the community, particularly through the Australian Red Cross Society and the Lindfield Women's Bowling Club	
Madonna Pearl Staunton	For service to the visual arts	
Neil Anthony Stephens	For service to cycling	
Diana Yorke Stott	For service to aged people with disabilities	
William Arthur Henry Stoyles	For service to veterans, particularly as Appeals Director, Victorian branch of the Returned and Services League of Australia	
Rasalingam Subramaniam	For service to multicultural organisations, the Tamil community and local government	
Louie John Sukari	For service to the Lebanese community	
Kathleen Cavenagh Symes	For service to the community, particularly through the RSPCA and the Victoria League for Commonwealth Friendship	
Joyce Winifred Thiele	For service to the community, particularly through the Children's Medical Research Institute	
Barry Edward Thompson	For service to aviation, particularly as General Manager, General Aviation, of the Federal Airports Corporation	
George Ronald Thoms	For service to gynaecology and obstetrics, and hospital administration	
Angus Leith Thomson	For service to tennis as a coach and administrator	
Joan Adel Thorburn	For service to local government	
Dr Bernard James Thorley	For service to special education	
Howard James Tily	For service to the community, particularly through St John Ambulance Australia	
John Henry Tinetti	For service to aged people through the Goldfields Aged Pensioners’ Welfare Association	
Mary Evelyn (Peg) Tozer	For service to people with intellectual disabilities	
William Arthur Creswick Trethowan	For service to lawn bowls administration	
Hazel Elizabeth Treweek, MBE	For service to the arts through the teaching and encouragement of drama	
George Francis Tucker	For service to the community, and to the funeral service industry	
Patricia Margaret Tyler	For service to children with disabilities	
Ruby May Muriel Underhill	For service to the Preston and Northcote Community Hospital Auxiliary	
Lieutenant Colonel Raymond Leo Underwood, (Ret'd)	For service to the Queensland Canine Control Council	
Winifred Ellen Urch	For service to the community	
Dr Peter George Valder	For service to botany and horticulture	
Adrianus Fransiscus Casper van den Ende	For service to the community, particularly through the State Emergency Service.	
Anthony William Dean Vaughan	For service to local government and the community	
Ferenc Vig	For service to gymnastics coaching and administration, the Queensland Renal Association and the Hungarian community	
Bruce Maxwell Viney	For service to the community and local government	
Dr Floriano Francesco Volpato	For service to the community, particularly the Italian community	
William Arthur Wade	For service to the community, the New South Wales Parliament and local government	
Peter Andrew Waite	For service to the community, particularly through the Scout Association of Australia	
Brian Joseph Waldron	For service to accountancy and the community	
Judith Devine Walker	For service to community health through nutrition education	
John Walker	For service to the housing and timber manufacturing industries	
Anthony John Warrener	For service to the community through the TAFE Motor Sport Service Smash Repair Team and to athletics administration	
William Johnson Waudby	For service to the community	
Robert Sidney Weatherall	For service to the community	
Desme Heather White	For service to dance education	
Gladys Winifred Whiteside	For service to the community, particularly people with vision impairment	
Russell Trevor Whitmore	For service to surf-lifesaving	
Bettine Isabel Wild	For service to diabetes education and to people with diabetes	
Charles Alexander William G. Wilson	For service to the community of Mount Gambier, particularly through social welfare, veterans’ and learning programmes	
Peter Muir Wilson	For service to the building and construction industry	
Gregory Bruce Withnell	For service to the community, particularly through the State Emergency Service Road Accident Rescue Service	
Ross Wolfenden	For service to sports and athletics coaching and administration	
William Chon-Fang Wong	For service to the Chinese community	
Marie Therese Woods	For service to the community, particularly through the Red Cross Singers	
Roy Samuel Worfold	For service to the community, particularly through communications workshops	
Noel Clifton Zeplin	For service to the preservation of Western Australia's railway heritage	

==== Military Division ====
Branch	Recipient	Citation	Notes
Navy	Warrant Officer Peter Gregory Derby	For service to the Royal Australian Navy, particularly in the field of marine engineering in HMAS Brisbane and HMAS Perth	
Navy	Senior Chaplain Brian Ernest Rayner	For meritorious service as a chaplain in the Royal Australian Navy, particularly as a Senior Chaplain	
Navy	Commander Bryan Douglas Stapley	For meritorious service in the Royal Australian Navy, particularly as Officer-in-Charge, Technical Training Centre, HMAS Cerberus	
Army	Warrant Officer Class One Alan James Bowen	For service as the Regimental Sergeant Major of the Australian Medical Support Force Australian Contingent, United Nations Assistance Mission in Rwanda	
Army	Warrant Officer Class One Barry Keith Brown	For service to the Australian Army as Chief Driving Instructor for the Army School of Transport	
Army	Warrant Officer Class One Barry Robert Buckley	For service to the Australian Defence Force, particularly as the Chief Photographer for the Department of Defence	
Army	Warrant Officer Class One Rodney Lance Carr	For service to the Australian Army in the fields of discipline, ceremonial and personnel administration within the 13th Brigade	
Army	Sergeant Colin Rowland Matthews	For meritorious service to the Army as the Chief Dog Trainer of explosive detection dogs at the School of Military Engineering	
Army	Warrant Officer Class One Siegfried Remin	For meritorious service to the Army as an instructor with the Land Warfare Centre and as the Regimental Sergeant Major of the Land Command Battle School	
Army	Warrant Officer Class Two Bruce John Williams	For meritorious service to the Army as Sergeant Major of the Base Administrative Support Centre Enoggera Military Police Section	
Air Force	Warrant Officer Beverley Jean Blyth	For service to the Royal Australian Air Force in the field of health services clerical support	
Air Force	Warrant Officer Jeffery John Bromhead	For meritorious service to the Royal Australian Air Force in the field of administration, particularly in the Office of the Chief of the Air Staff	
Air Force	Sergeant Michael Gerard Dowling	For service to the Royal Australian Air Force in the field of Air Movements	
Air Force	Flight Sergeant Rodney William Sullivan	For meritorious service to the Royal Australian Air Force in the field of Motor Transport Fleet Database Management	
