= Norm Gallagher =

Australian trade unionist

Norman Leslie Gallagher (20 September 1931 – 26 August 1999) was a controversial Australian trade unionist, and Maoist who led the militant Builders Labourers Federation as federal Secretary and as Victorian State Secretary.

== Early life and career ==
Gallagher was raised in Melbourne and joined the Builders Labourers Federation (BLF) in 1951. By 1970, he was elected as the BLF's Victorian State Secretary and radically improved pay and conditions on building sites. His militant leadership style initially united union factions but later alienated other union leaders and the Victorian Labor Government.

Gallagher was also a high-profile member of the Communist Party of Australia (Marxist-Leninist). He stated:

Our union had a long history of concern for the environment. The Sydney union in the early seventies raised the question of the name 'green ban'. We were a bit old fashioned. We still call them 'black bans'. For instance, we were involved in the conservation issues as far back as 1940 when they were going to build a small goods factory opposite the Royal Melbourne Hospital. We put a black ban on it, said that it would destroy the environment of that area. It would have had an effect on the patients of the Royal Melbourne Hospital.

As Secretary of the union, Gallagher also acted to preserve the distinct Melbourne boulevards such as Royal Parade from development and many historic buildings from destruction including the Regent Theatre and the City Baths. A BLF black ban also protected the historic Bakery Hill site in Ballarat, where huge mass meetings were held in 1854 during the Eureka rebellion, from development.

Gallagher faced many protests when he directed the Federal union to intervene in the affairs of the New South Wales branch of the union in the mid-seventies. Many of the democratic measures installed by the NSW Branch leadership by Jack Mundey, Bob Pringle and Joe Owens and others were scrapped and many of the democratically imposed green bans were lifted. Officials of the NSW Branch eventually urged members to join the imposed branch, but were themselves blacklisted from the industry by Federal Union officials. The Federal takeover of the NSW Branch was instrumental in calling off many of the imposed green bans, and the cancellation of the union's commitment to fighting for permanence in the building industry.

Following a Royal Commission into the BLF's business affairs, it was deregistered. Gallagher was convicted of obtaining building materials from construction companies while he himself was building a house in Gippsland. This was the first trial in Victorian history in which a jury was locked up for ten days until they delivered a verdict. On appeal, the trial and verdict were declared "unsafe" and a retrial was ordered. In the retrial he was found guilty of seventeen charges and sentenced to 18 months in jail. An appeal against the conviction was dismissed.

== Later life and death ==
By 1992–1993, the officials, staff and members of the BLF were exhausted, with Gallagher himself in ill-health. Bereft of funds, the BLF was forcibly amalgamated into the CFMEU.

From 1988 up to his death in 1999, Gallagher played a vital role in the struggle to re-organise the Communist Party and was a member of the National Preparatory Committee of the Marxist-Leninist Communist Party of Australia.

Gallagher died in Melbourne on 26 August 1999.
