= Justina Williams =

Australian journalist and activist (1914–2008)

Justina Williams AM
- Born: Marjorie Georgina Joan Allen; 26 January 1916; Coolgardie, Western Australia
- Died: 21 June 2008 (aged 92); Western Australia
- Occupations: Poet; journalist
- Writing career
- Pen name: Joan Williams

Justina Williams AM (26 January 1916 – 21 June 2008) was an Australian poet, journalist, feminist and peace activist.

== Life ==
Marjorie Georgina Joan Allen was born in Coolgardie, Western Australia on 26 January 1916.

Williams was employed as a journalist by The West Australian and the Daily News in Perth and became involved with peace activism, left-wing politics and feminism. She joined the Communist Party of Australia in 1939.

In the 1950s, Williams campaigned for nuclear disarmament, while in the 1970s she was an early member of the Women's Electoral Lobby.

Williams was appointed Member of the Order of Australia in the 1996 Australia Day Honours for "service to the community as a writer, particularly in the areas of peace, social equality and protection of the environment".

Williams died in Western Australia on 21 June 2008.

== Selected works ==
=== Poetry ===
- By All the Clocks, Saturday Centre, 1975
- Poems of Protest, Lone Hand Press, 1982
- People and Peace, Lone Hand Press, 1986
- My Country, the World, Lone Hand Press, 2003

=== Fiction ===
- White River and Other Stories, Fremantle Press, 1979
- The Bird Girl, illustrated by Trevor Weekes, Kangaroo Press, 1984 (for children)
- The Edge of the Swamp, Lone Hand Press, 2003

=== Nonfiction ===
- The First Furrow, Lone Hand Press, 1976
- Trade unionism : "them bees is organised", Lothian Books, 1978
- Anger and Love: A life of struggle and commitment, Fremantle Press, 1993

=== As editor ===
- On Strenuous Wings: A half-century of selected writings from the works of Katharine Susannah Prichard, Seven Seas, 1965
- Tom Collins and His House, Tom Collins Press for Fellowship of Australian Writers, WA, 1973
