= Swimming in Australia =

- Country: Australia
- Governing body: Swimming Australia
- National team: Australia
- Nickname: Dolphins

National competitions
- Australian Swimming Championships

International competitions
- Oceania Swimming Championships; Pan Pacific Swimming Championships; Swimming at the World Aquatics Championships

Audience records
- Single match: 17,595, 16 September 2000, Sydney Olympic Park Aquatic Centre

Swimming in Australia refers to the sport of swimming played in Australia. The sport has a high level of participation in the country both recreational and professional.

== History ==
Frederick Lane was the first male Australian Olympic swimmer.He competed at the 1900 Paris Olympics, and won two gold medals in the 200m freestyle and 200m obstacle race. He was also the first person to swim 100 yards under 1 minute in 1902.

== Governing body ==
Swimming Australia is the national sporting body.

== Tournaments ==
Australian Swim Team known as The Dolphins participates in major competitions:

- Summer Olympic Games
- FINA Long Course World Championships
- FINA Short Course World Championships
- Commonwealth Games
- Pan Pacific Swimming Championships
