= Jack Mundey =

Australian trade unionist (1929–2020)

Jack Mundey AO
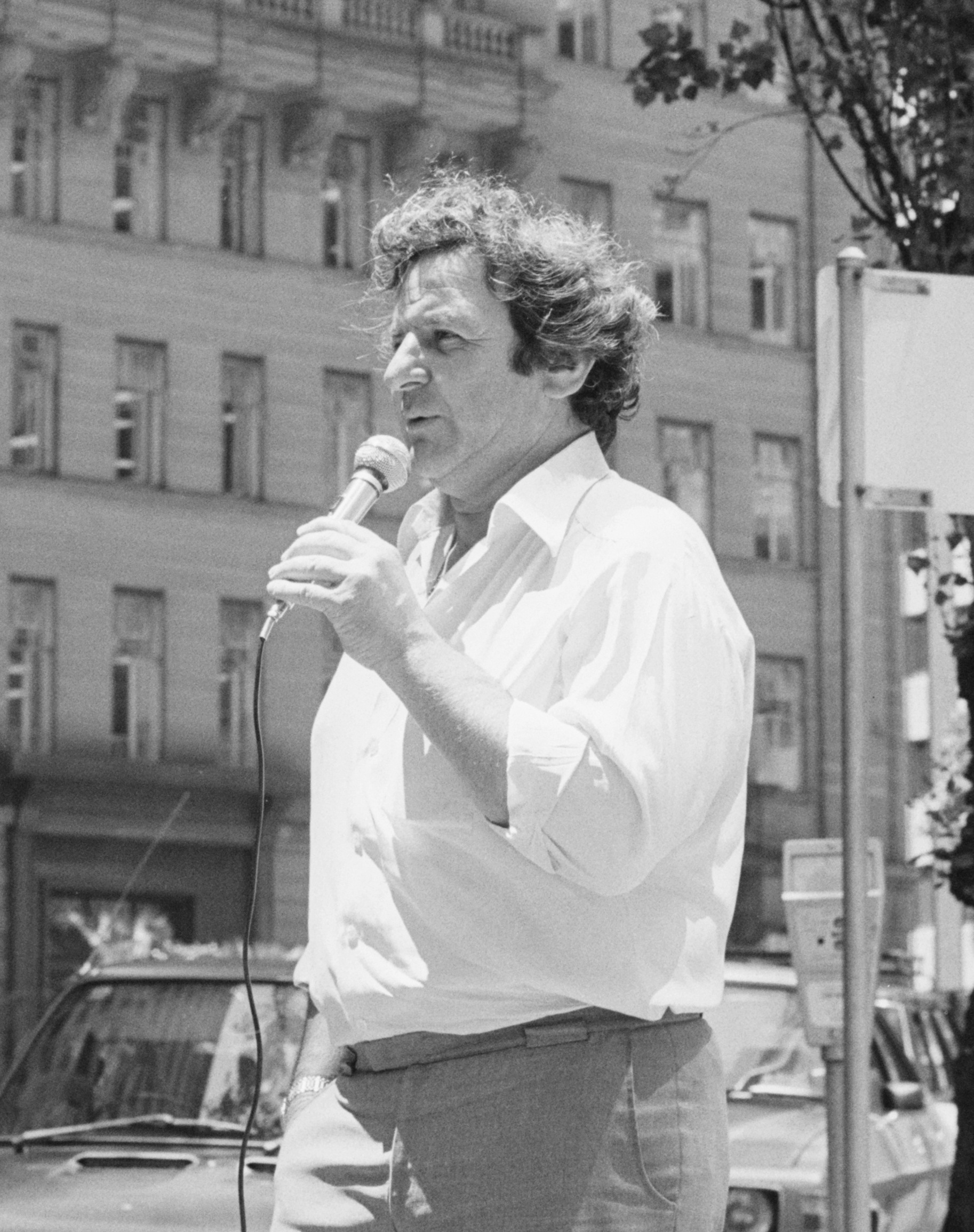
- Sydney, 1977

Councillor for the City of Sydney
- In office 1984–1987

Personal details
- Born: John Bernard Mundey; 17 October 1929 Malanda, Queensland, Australia
- Died: 10 May 2020 (aged 90)
- Party: Communist Party (1957-1991)
- Other political affiliations: New Left Party; Greens (2003-2020)
- Known for: Builders Labourers Federation's, green bans

John Bernard "Jack" Mundey AO (17 October 1929 – 10 May 2020) was an Australian communist, trade unionist and environmental activist. He came to prominence during the 1970s for leading the New South Wales Builders' Labourers Federation (BLF) in the famous green bans, whereby the BLF led a successful campaign to protect the built and natural environment of Sydney from excessive and inappropriate development. Mundey was the patron of the Historic Houses Association of Australia.

== Early years ==
John Bernard "Jack" Mundey was born on 17 October 1929 in Malanda, Queensland on the Johnstone River in the Atherton Tablelands, some 100 km west of Cairns. He was one of five siblings born to Catholic parents of Irish descent. His father was a lifetime Labor voter. His mother died when he was six. He was educated at Malanda Primary School and at St Augustine's, Cairns. He ran away from the latter due to its "authoritarian methods" of discipline.

Mundey moved to Sydney when he was 19, and became a metalworker and later a builder's labourer, joining successively the Federated Ironworkers' Association and the Builders Labourers Federation. He also played rugby league for Parramatta under Vic Hey for three years. He joined the Communist Party of Australia (CPA) in 1957.

The CPA at this time was Eurocommunist. Mundey was a follower of the Italian communist theorist Antonio Gramsci. He expounded the theory of "workers' control" which was based on the Gramscian theory of workers control; by working together people were supposed to emancipate themselves from their ideological delusions.

Mundey's first wife was Stephanie Lennon; the couple had a son, Michael. 15 months after her son's birth, Stephanie Mundey died at a young age from a brain tumour. Mundey remarried, in 1965, to Judith Ann Willcocks, known as Judy Mundey. Michael, Mundey's only child, was killed in a car accident at age 22.

During the 1960s, Mundey was a crusading unionist and an advocate on a wide range of issues from safety reforms on building sites to wider issues such as feminism, gay rights and international politics. Mundey considered all these matters appropriate targets for union activism. His second wife, Judy, joined him in these campaigns and later rose to become national president of the CPA.

== Green bans ==
In 1968, Mundey was elected secretary of the NSW Builders' Labourers Federation (BLF). From this position, he became a highly visible individual who, with his union and supportive community members, was responsible for the green bans that saved much of Sydney's heritage and built environment. He insisted that the priorities of development be reversed such that the open community spaces and heritage buildings be preserved and that affordable public housing was more important than accumulating empty or underused commercial buildings.

In 1975, Mundey and other New South Wales leaders of the BLF were expelled from the union by the federal leadership under Norm Gallagher, who was later to be convicted of corrupt dealings with developers.

According to Senator Bob Brown, former parliamentary leader of the Australian Greens the use of the term "Green" as a political category actually derives from the green bans, by way of Petra Kelly's visit to Sydney in 1977.

Mundey's autobiography, Green Bans and Beyond, was published in 1981. In 1981 Mundey joined the Quayhole Committee in their effort to save the landing site of the First Fleet at Circular Quay.

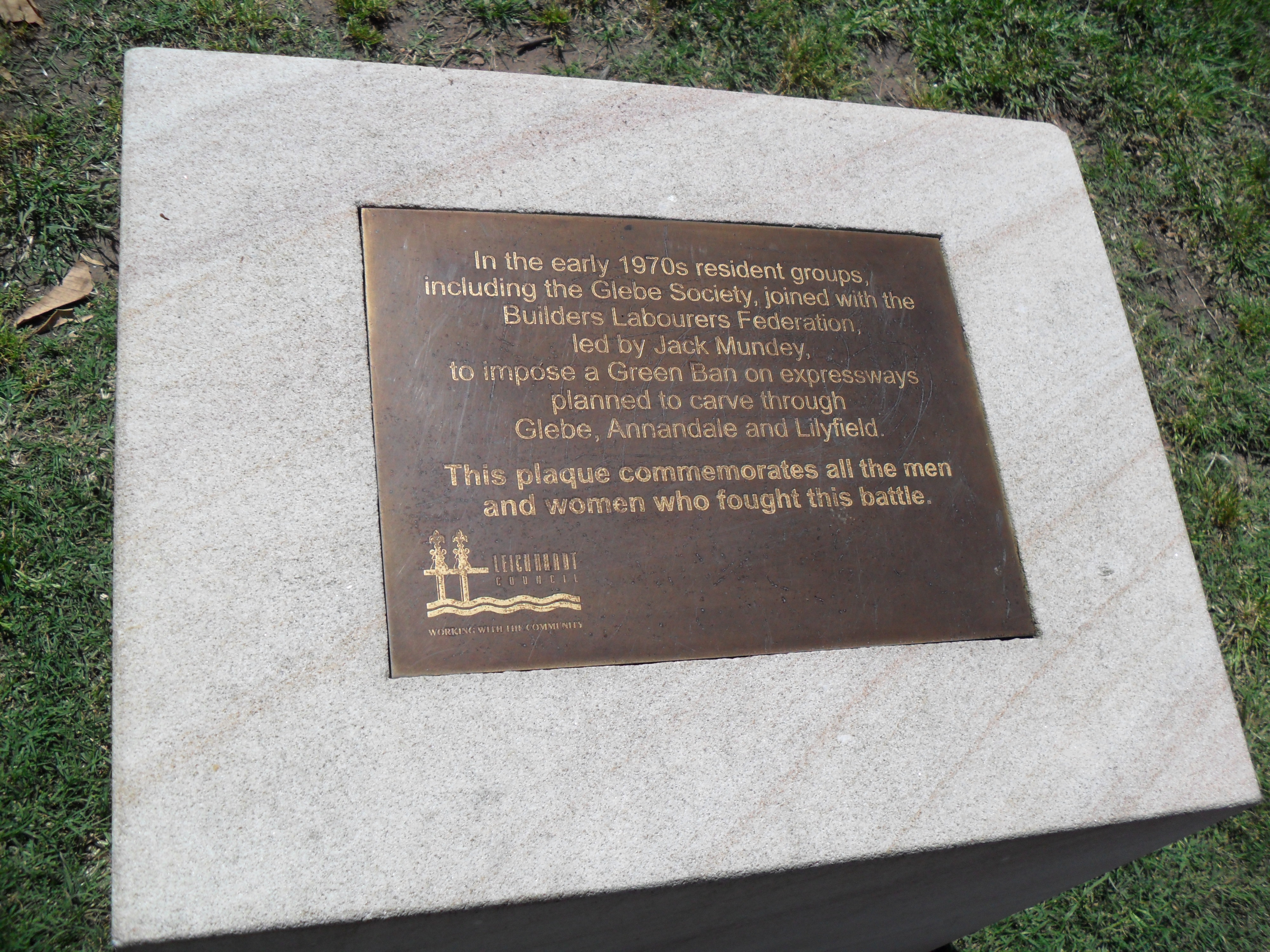
A plaque in Annandale commemorating the work of Mundey and the union

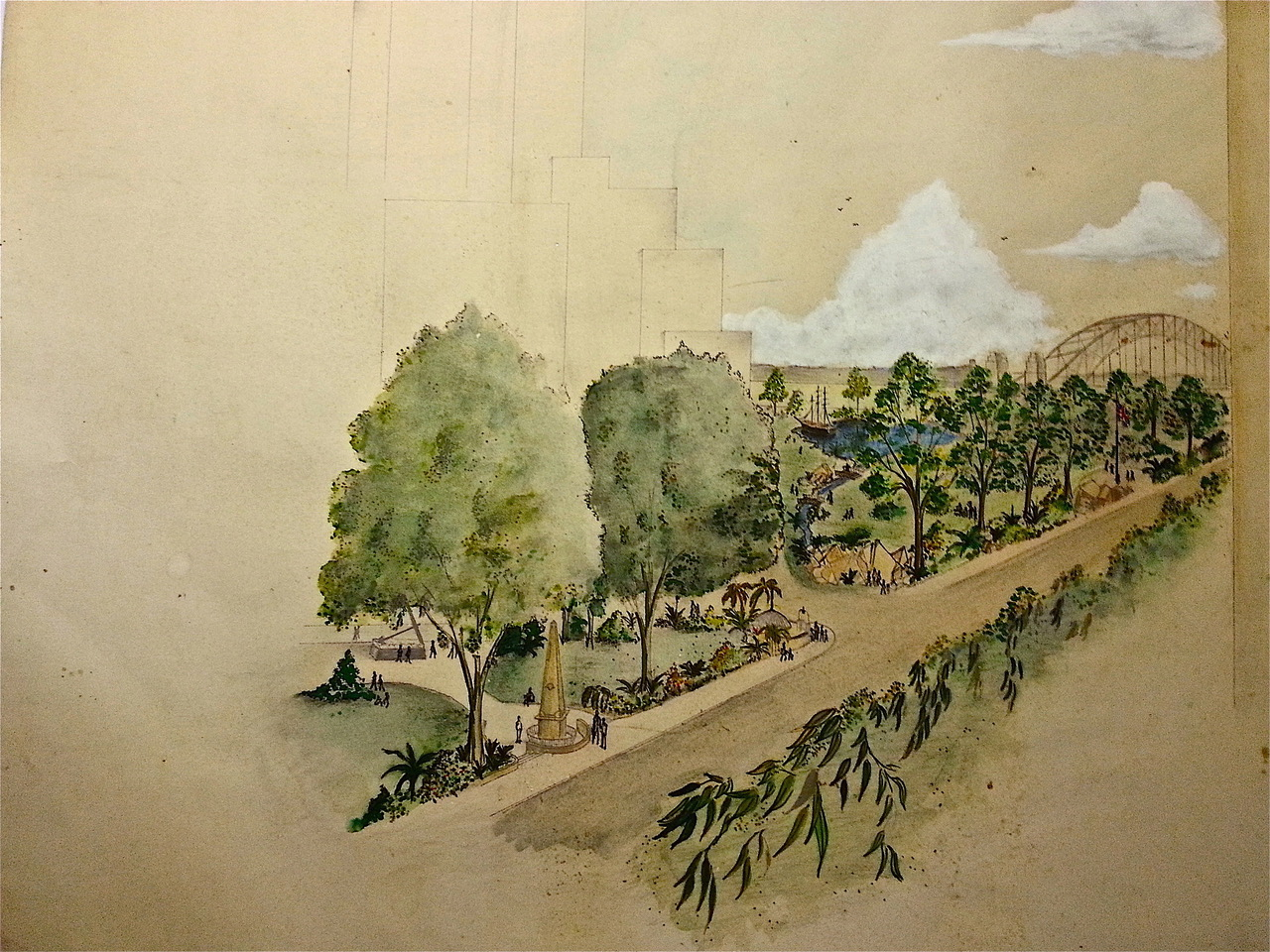
Watercolour Drawing of Memorial Park proposal for the First Fleet Landing Site (The Gateway Site) at Circular Quay.

== Politics ==
Mundey was the lead Legislative Council candidate of the Communist Party of Australia at the 1978 New South Wales state election. His party polled almost 80,000 votes – 2.9 per cent of the statewide total – and outpolled the Australian Democrats. Mundey came close to winning a seat, and was the last candidate excluded from the count.

Mundey served as an alderman on the City of Sydney council from 1984 to 1987. He was chairman of the planning committee of Sydney City Council from May 1984 to September 1985.

He ran as the NSW Greens 4th Senate candidate for the 2007 federal election.

== Later life ==
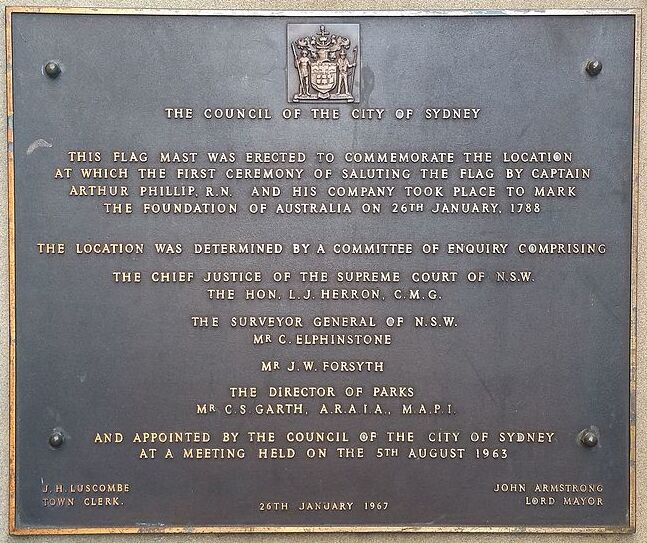
Foundation of Australia plaque, Loftus Street, Circular Quay

In 1988, the University of Western Sydney made Mundey an honorary Doctor of Letters and an honorary Doctor of Science in recognition of his service to the environment for the previous 30 years.

Mundey was made a life member of the Australian Conservation Foundation in the 1990s. In 1995, in keeping with his continued interest in Sydney and the state's urban environment and heritage, he was appointed chair of the Historic Houses Trust of New South Wales, and he was also the patron of the Historic Houses Association of Australia.

In 2003, Mundey joined the Australian Greens, citing their opposition to the Iraq War and their environmental stance. He remained a member until his death.

In February 2007, the Geographical Names Board of New South Wales renamed a portion of Argyle Street in The Rocks "Jack Mundey Place" in recognition of his leadership "in the fight to preserve such significant sites in the historic Rocks area."

During mid 2009, the NSW State Labor Government headed by Premier Nathan Rees, announced the now cancelled CBD Metro rail project for Sydney. Mundey would once again enter the fray to help fight the demolition of historic buildings and space, this time in Sydney's Pyrmont and Rozelle. The government had planned to build a metro style railway between the existing city circle, over to Rozelle. This involved demolishing numerous buildings and businesses along the way. Ultimately, the CBD Metro project was cancelled, after a storm of protest.

In 2014, Mundey was named Patron of the Friends of Millers Point as he joined the fight to save the Sirius building which was built for the people of The Rocks when the green bans saved them from eviction and The Rocks from demolition forty years earlier. In 2012, he joined the action to preserve Windsor Bridge from further development. In 2017, he was awarded the NSW President's Prize at the NSW Architecture Awards.

In 2021, the year after Mundey's death, Eastlakes Reserve was renamed Jack Mundey Reserve at the request of Bayside Council.
