= Jeremy Fisher (author) =

Australian writer

Jeremy Fisher (born 9 November 1954 in Te Ahora, New Zealand) is an Australian author who was Executive Director of the Australian Society of Authors (ASA). He is a writer and worked in publishing for 30 years. His best-known novel is Perfect Timing.

== Career ==
Fisher is openly gay and has been an advocate for gay rights in Australia since 1973. In 1973 he became the centre point of The Pink Ban.

By 1978 he was a member of the New South Wales Labor Party in the Glebe branch.

He was awarded the inaugural medal of the Australian Society of Indexers for his index to the fourth edition of the Australian Encyclopaedia in 1984.

He was appointed President of the NSW Society of Editors in 1986.

In 2007, Fisher was awarded a grant by the Literature Board of the Australia Council for the Arts to develop a work of literary non-fiction. In 2008 he was shortlisted for the Calibre Prize for Best Essay offered by Australian Book Review. The ASA is the peak body representing Australia's literary creators. As an advocate for authors, Fisher was instrumental in the establishment of the Prime Minister's Literature Prizes by the new Labor government of Kevin Rudd in December 2007.

Fisher has been a judge for the Walkley Awards non-fiction book in 2006, 2007 and 2008.

== Bibliography ==
- "On Joni Mitchell" (article), GLP: A journal of sexual politics, Sydney, Spring, 1975, pp. 62–69
- "Interface: Medicine and homosexuality in Australia", Gay Information (Sydney), Summer 1982–1983, pp. 44–48
- "Shock an indexer: Notice him", The Sydney Morning Herald, 1983, 15 January
- Mathematics: A Philosophical Treatise, self-published, Sydney, 1984 ISBN 0-9590350-0-1
- Diversions from Routine, Fat Frog books, Sydney, 1985 ISBN 0-9590350-1-X
- The Erko cookbook: principles and practice of cookery in Erskineville: the present, Fat Frog Books, Sydney, 1991 ISBN 0-9590350-2-8
- Perfect Timing, Harcourt Brace & Co, Sydney, 1993 ISBN 0-7295-1017-4
- "By permission of G.M. Glaskin," Overland, no. 169, Summer, 2002, pp 55–58 ISSN 0030-7416
- "Heritage restoration", Australian Author, vol. 36, no. 1, April 2004, pp. 8–13
- "Poll dancing", Australian Author, vol. 36, no. 2, August 2004, pp. 32–33.
- "Cuddling the wrong characters: reading, writing and gay self-identity", Overland, 176 Spring 2004, pp. 61–66.
- "Who is right about their rights?" Art + Law, September, 2004: 6-7
- "Have we lost the plot?" Australian Author, 2004, vol. 36, no. 3, December: 32-32
- "The circle game", Australian Author, 2005, vol. 37, no. 1, April, pp. 32–33
- "Ban on the run", Australian Author, 2005, vol. 37, no. 2, August: 32-33
- "A Google googly", Australian Author, 2005, vol. 37, no.3, December, pp. 32–33
- "The Professional Author: Researching creativity and reality", Text, 10, 1, April 2006 (This paper was delivered on 25 November 2005 as a Plenary Address at Alchemy: Blending Research and Creativity, the Tenth Annual Conference of the Australian Association of Writing Programs, Curtin University of Technology, Perth, 25–27 November 2005)
- "Distributing woes", Australian Author, 2006, vol. 38, no.1, April, pp. 32–33
- "It's Not Over until the Fat Author Sings!", Australian Author, vol.38, no.3, December 2006, pp. 32–33
- "Books Alive: an affront to Australian authors", Southern Write, September 2005, p. 4
- Current Publishing Practice, The Australian Society of Authors (ASA), Sydney, 2005
- "In Praise of (Gay) Pulp", Journal of Publishing, vol.1, no.1, October 2005, pp. 78–96
- "The Publishing Pie: Who Gets What?", Southern Write, August 2005, p. 4
- "Writing in a Time of Terror", ACTWrite: The ACT Writers' Centre Magazine, no.167 March 2007, pp. 4–5
- "Australian Author: Moron or Oxymoron?", Australian Author, vol.39, no.1 April 2007. pp. 32–33
- "Status of Books Not Worth a Can of Beans", The Sydney Morning Herald, 11–12 August 2007, p. 7
- "Compelling Reviewers Exposed!", Australian Author, vol.39, no.2, August 2007, pp. 32–33
- "Professional Authorship: The Key to Living from Writing", Australian Author, vol.39, no.3 December 2007, pp. 32–33
- "Into the Light" (autobiography), Overland, no.191, Winter 2008, pp. 52–56
- "How to tell your father to drop dead", Southerly, vol. 68, no. 2, 2008, pp. 114–124
- "So you want the truth" [fiction vs non-fiction], Australian Author, vol. 40, no. 1, April 2008, pp. 32–33
- "A sharp pencil and a questioning mind" [editorial rigour], Australian Author, vol. 40, no. 2, August 2008, pp. 32–33
- "Secret book business" [book publishing statistics], Australian Author, vol. 40, no. 3, December 2008, pp. 32–33
- "Sticky fingers: The Google generation", Australian Author, vol. 41, no. 1, April 2009, pp. 32–33
- Music from another Country, Fat Frog Books, Sydney, 2009, ISBN 978-1-4092-8416-1 ISBN 978-0-9590350-3-2
- Co may dung lac, Nha Xuat Ban Van Hoc (Literature Publishing House), Hanoi, 2009, no ISBN
- Fisher, Jeremy (March 2012). "Wrestling with a dilemma". Australian Author. 44 (1): 5–7.

=== Fiction ===
- Fisher, Jeremy (January–February 1975). "Fragments". GLP: A Journal of Sexual Politics. 6: 62–67.
- "The man who watched the coast" (short story), Arena (Sydney, Macquarie University), 21 June 1976, p. 21
- "The poofter's dog" (short story), Overland, no. 177, Summer, 2004, pp. 48–51
- "Winter Afternoon" (short story), Overland, no.189 Summer 2007, pp. 49–55

=== Poetry ===
- Three poems "Words 32", "You are not my master, baby", and "Whoresong" in Edge City on two different plans, book ed. D. Sargent, G. Dunne, L Wakeling and M. Bradstock, InVersions, 1983, Sydney, pp. 88–89 ISBN 0-949876-01-1
- "Road Closed" (poetry), Overland, no.187 Winter 2007, p. 77
