= Green ban =

Environment-related strike action

A green ban is a form of strike action, usually taken by a trade union or other organised labour group, which is conducted for environmentalist or conservationist purposes. They mainly took place in Australia during the 1970s, led by the Builders Labourers Federation (BLF) and used to protect parkland, low-income housing and buildings with historical significance. At times, industrial action was used in relation to other issues, such as when a "pink ban" was placed on Macquarie University due to the expulsion of Jeremy Fisher, a gay man, from student housing.

== History ==
Green bans were first conducted in Australia in the 1970s by the New South Wales Builders Labourers Federation (BLF). Green bans were never instigated unilaterally by the BLF, all green bans were at the request of, and in support of, residents' groups. The first green ban was put in place to protect Kelly's Bush, the last remaining undeveloped bushland in the Sydney suburb of Hunters Hill. A group of local women who had already appealed to the local council, mayor, and the Premier of New South Wales, approached the BLF for help. The BLF asked the women to call a public meeting, which was attended by 600 residents, and formally asked the BLF to prevent construction on the site. The developer, A V Jennings, announced that they would use non-union labour as strikebreakers. In response, BLF members on other A V Jennings construction projects stopped work. A V Jennings eventually abandoned all plans to develop Kelly's Bush. Jack Mundey summarised the philosophy of the Green Bans as such:

Yes, we want to build. However, we prefer to build urgently-required hospitals, schools, other public utilities, high-quality flats, units and houses, provided they are designed with adequate concern for the environment, than to build ugly unimaginative architecturally-bankrupt blocks of concrete and glass offices... Though we want all our members employed, we will not just become robots directed by developer-builders who value the dollar at the expense of the environment. More and more, we are going to determine which buildings we will build... The environmental interests of three million people are at stake and cannot be left to developers and building employers whose main concern is making profit. Progressive unions, like ours, therefore have a very useful social role to play in the citizens' interest, and we intend to play it.

The BLF was involved in many more green bans. Not only did the BLF represent all unionised builders' labourers in the construction industry; but the BLF also influenced the opinion of other unionised construction workers, and acted as a political leadership of the construction unions in the era. Fifty-four bans were imposed in NSW between 1971 and 1974. Green bans helped to protect historic nineteenth century buildings in The Rocks from being demolished to make way for office towers, and prevented the Royal Botanic Gardens from being turned into a carpark for the Sydney Opera House. The BLF stopped conducting green bans in 1974 after the federal leadership under Norm Gallagher dismissed the leaders of the New South Wales branch.

Although green bans have been implemented on a number of occasions since the 1970s, they have not been so prevalent, nor so comprehensive in their effect. One estimate of the effect of the BLF's green bans puts the amount of development prevented at A$3 billion between 1971 and 1974 (approximately A$25 billion in 2018 money).

=== Victoria Street ===
One of the last bans to be removed was to prevent development of Victoria Street in the suburb of Potts Point. This ban involved hundreds of residents, trade union members, and other activists and was successful for a number of years, despite facing a well-connected developer who employed thugs to harass residents. Arthur King, the head of the residents' action group, was kidnapped in 1973. It was suspected, though never proved, that the men who kidnapped him had been hired by the property developer, Frank Theeman. The New South Wales Police collaborated with Theeman and his employees during the ban and eventually carried out a forced mass eviction of squatters and residents, which saw squatters barricade themselves in a siege for two days. In 1973 mysterious arson attacks happened across Victoria Street, which killed 23 year old Esther George. The green ban was broken in 1974 when the conservative federal leadership of the BLF, under pressure from New South Wales politicians, dismissed the leaders of the New South Wales branch, and replaced them with more conservative people who did not support the ban. Activists, led by activist, resident, and journalist Juanita Nielsen, then convinced another union, the Water Board Employees Union, to impose a ban which was continued for some time. Nielsen was then kidnapped and murdered in 1975. The struggle ended with a stand-off in 1977. The developer had been forced to alter his plans, but the residents had been forced out.

== Outcomes and impacts ==
In February 1973, Jack Mundey coined the term "green ban" to distinguish them from the traditional union "black bans". Mundey argued that the term "green ban" was more appropriate as they were in defence of the environment. Green bans saved many vital urban spaces and over 100 buildings were considered by the National Trust to be worthy of preservation.

Another example of a green ban in Sydney was the proposed North-Western Expressway that was planned by the Department of Main Roads in the early 1970s. The expressway would have cut through the working class residential areas of Ultimo, Glebe, Annandale, Rozelle and Leichhardt. In July 1972, the Save Lyndhurst Committee requested a green ban from the Builders Labourers' Federation to prevent the destruction of historic Lyndhurst (built 1833–1835) in Darghan Street, Glebe. Many battles with police took place, including a confrontation between police and squatters on 18 August 1972. The Federal Labor Whitlam government purchased the Glebe estate in 1973 from the Anglican Diocese of Glebe to preserve the area. In 1978, the Wran-Labor Government decided to abandon much of the inner-urban expressway link and the 19th century character of Glebe remains intact.

=== Local legacies: New South Wales ===
Green bans influenced local NSW planning structures as well as national planning systems. "The Green ban movement in Sydney and Melbourne of the early 1970s, led by the Builder Labourers Federation, was the most profound external indication of the need for planning reform." In 1977 an editorial from the Australian quoted "bans were an inevitable result of official attitudes which regarded people as irrelevant factors to development". He also indicated that the decision-making process then was devoid of appropriate involvement by relevant communities and individuals.

During the movement infamous redevelopment projects were discarded or scale down, and the planning reform finally began. The previously confined approach to land use planning, due to a "paradigm meltdown", started to incorporate concerns from community. On one hand, new historical buildings legislations were founded in the 1970s across several states, and on the other the ground legislation of the current planning system

=== National reforms and Legacy: Australia ===
The green bans in the 1970s initiated a democratic National and State planning systems in which heritage as well as environmentally significant sites became a part of a development proposal. 'In 1997 the Director of the Urban Research Unit of the Australian National University, stated that the green bans of the New South Wales Builders Labourers' Federation (NSW BLF) had a "subtle influence" in transforming the culture of urban planning in ways that now evince greater sensitivity to environmental concerns, better appreciation of heritage, the need to publicise proposed developments well in advance and to seek approval from the people affected'. Similar union bans were started in other cities in Australia including Brisbane, Adelaide, Melbourne, Canberra and Hobart however to a lesser level than Sydney. The green ban movement became a powerful tool of influencing city developments by involving the wider community to sign petitions in order to prevent destruction of a heritage or environmentally significant sites. Ultimately, the green bans led to the Wran government introducing two acts, firstly the Heritage legislation- The Heritage Act 1977, and secondly the Environmental Planning and Assessment Act (EP&A) 1979.

The Greens New South Wales (and by extension the federal party) in part draws its name from the Green Bans, and the New South Wales branch evolved out of the Green ban movement. Jack Mundey would later Join the Greens in the early 1990s

=== International influences ===
Although green bans were conducted for only three to four years in Australia, they influenced international politics significantly because this movement is considered to have contributed to the integration of the word "green" into the world's political idioms.

The German politician Petra Kelly came to Australia around the middle of the 1970s and witnessed green bans opposing undesirable development in Sydney by the cooperation between the BLF and local citizens. She was very impressed with this movement, the connection accomplished between environmentalists and the BLF, and the success they made in many campaigns. It is also known that she often stated that green bans had a great impact on both herself and her philosophy. Subsequently, she brought back the idea of green bans as well as the terminology "green" to Germany, and established the German Green Party in 1979. This is regarded as the point at which the word "green" was first applied to politics in Europe. Petra Kelly acknowledged that Australian green bans broadened the possibilities of the environmental movement as well as gave it a new dimension, and they made it possible to involve a much broader range of the population in environmental groups and ecological actions. Therefore, green bans in Australia were significant events not only locally and nationally but also internationally.

== Notable green bans ==
=== Adelaide ===
- Highbury Park
- Norwood Velodrome
- Unley Road Shops

=== Brisbane ===
- Bellevue Hotel
- Queensland Club
- The Mansions

=== Canberra ===
- Black Mountain Tower
- Googong Dam
- Reid House

=== Melbourne ===
- 61 Spring Street/7 Collins Street
- Arthurs Seat
- ANZ Banking Museum
- Blanche Terrace
- Beaurepaire Pool
- Carlton
- CBA Bank Building/333 Collins Street
- City Baths
- Emerald Hill
- Flinders Street station
- Gordon House
- Hardy-Gallagher Reserve
- Hotel Windsor
- Mac's Hotel
- Mordialloc Coles
- Newport Power Station
- Old Treasury Building
- Parkville
- Princess Theatre
- Queen Victoria Market
- Regent Theatre
- Royal Botanical Gardens
- Royal Parade
- St Patrick's Cathedral
- Tasma Terrace

=== Newcastle ===
- East End
- Newcastle Motorway

=== Perth ===
- Fremantle
- Palace Hotel
- Victoria Hall

=== Sydney ===
- ANZ Branch, Martin Place
- Balmain
- Botany
- Burwood
- Centennial Park
- Centennial Parklands
- Colonial Mutual Building
- CML Building – Martin Place
- Darlinghurst
- Diethnes Greek Restaurant
- Eastern Freeway
- Eastern Hill
- Eastlakes
- Glebe
- Kellys Bush
- Kings Cross
- Lyndhurst
- Macquarie University
- Mascot
- Merrylands
- Mount Druitt
- National Mutual Building - Martin Place
- Newcastle Hotel
- New Doctors Dwellings
- North Newtown Education Complex
- North Western Expressway
- Pitt Street Uniting Church
- Pyrmont
- Redfern Aboriginal Centre
- Regent Theatre
- Rileys Island
- Royal Australasian College of Physicians
- Royal Botanic Gardens
- Ryde
- Soldiers Garden Village
- South Sydney
- St George Area
- St John's Park
- Sydney University
- Theatre Royal
- The Rocks
- Ultimo
- Victoria Street
- Waimea House
- Waterloo
- Woolloomooloo

=== Wollongong ===
- Port Kembla
- East Woonona
- Keiraville

=== Other cities ===
- Battery Point, Hobart
- Dr. Busby's Cottage, Bathurst
- Port Macquarie
- Yallourn

== See also ==
- Black Armada
- The Pink Ban
- 1938 Dalfram dispute
- Earth Strike
- Eco-socialism
- 1971 Harco work-In
- Juanita Nielsen
- Red–green alliance
- NIMBY
- Workers' control

== Notes ==
1. "A perspective on Sydney's Green ban Campaign, 1970-74". Teaching Heritage. Archived from the original on 18 June 2005.
