= Builders Labourers Federation =

Australian trade union

BLFQ
- Builders Labourers Federation Queensland
- Merged into: Construction, Forestry, Mining and Energy Union
- Founded: 1910
- Dissolved: 1986
- Headquarters: Brisbane, Queensland
- Location: Australia
- Key people: David Hanna (State Secretary), Kane Pearson (State Assistant Secretary).
- Affiliations: Australian Labor Party

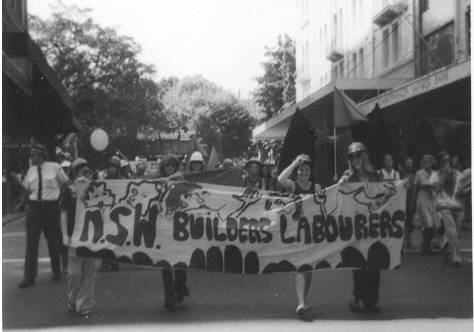
Female members of the NSW Builders Labourers Federation march on International Women's Day in Sydney in 1975

The Builders Labourers Federation (BLF) was an Australian trade union that existed from 1911 until 1972, and from 1976 until 1986, when it was deregistered in various Australian states by the Hawke Government and some state governments of the time. This occurred in the wake of a Royal Commission into corruption by the union. About the same time, BLF federal secretary Norm Gallagher was jailed for corrupt dealings after receiving bribes from building companies that he used to build a beach house.

== Social and economic justice ==
The BLF fought successful campaigns which became known as the green bans against development projects which it viewed as harmful to the built and natural environment of Sydney and Melbourne. These campaigns included blocking plans to redevelop The Rocks area, Kelly's Bush in Hunters Hill, Centennial Park, the City Baths, Flinders Street station, Victoria Street in Potts Point, and the Hotel Windsor. The green bans are now commonly recognised as directly responsible for saving areas of Sydney and Melbourne with substantial heritage value. Victoria Hall in Fremantle, Western Australia was also saved from demolition by a green ban, in 1974.

They also took up other causes, such as Aboriginal rights, anti-war campaigns and support for pensioners. In NSW the union engaged in 'pink bans', halting work at universities to support gay students facing expulsion and discrimination. The BLF had a long-standing programme on radio station 3CR, "The Concrete Gang", which is now presented by the Construction, Forestry, Mining and Energy Union. One of the original announcers for the BLF was John Cummins.

=== Work-ins ===
The BLF also helped organise a number of "work-ins" across Australia, where workers would take over a site for a few weeks and run it under workers' control. Some notable examples include:

- 1972: Sydney Opera House
- 1974: Wyong Plaza

== NSW branch intervention ==
The federal union under Norm Gallagher faced many protests initially when it intervened in the affairs of the NSW branch of the union in the mid-seventies. Many of the democratic measures installed by the NSW branch leadership by Jack Mundey, Bob Pringle, Joe Owens and others were scrapped and many of the democratically imposed green bans were lifted. Officials of the NSW branch eventually urged members to join the imposed branch, but were themselves blacklisted from the industry by federal union officials. The federal takeover of the NSW branch was instrumental in calling off many of the imposed green bans and the cancellation of the union's commitment to fighting for permanence in the building industry.

== BLF in Queensland ==
The BLF existed in Queensland as a state registered union (known as the Australian Building Construction Employees and Builders' Labourers' Federation (Queensland Branch) Union of Employees). The Queensland BLF was a part of the national BLF prior to the de-registration and was not as radical or militant as the branches in Victoria and New South Wales were perceived to be.

Whilst the BLF is usually associated with the left of the political spectrum, the Queensland BLF was historically aligned with the right faction of the Australian Labor Party. The Queensland BLF was a member of the Labor Unity faction which is sometimes referred to as the Old Guard. The Labor Unity Faction often votes with the "right" faction (also known as the AWU or Forum faction) at state Labor conferences.

On 16 October 2013, at the CFMEU Construction National Conference in Cairns, BLF secretary David Hanna and left-wing CFMEU Queensland (Construction Division) secretary Michael Ravbar announced the two unions would be merging. The merger was finalised in 2014.
