= Railways in Sydney =

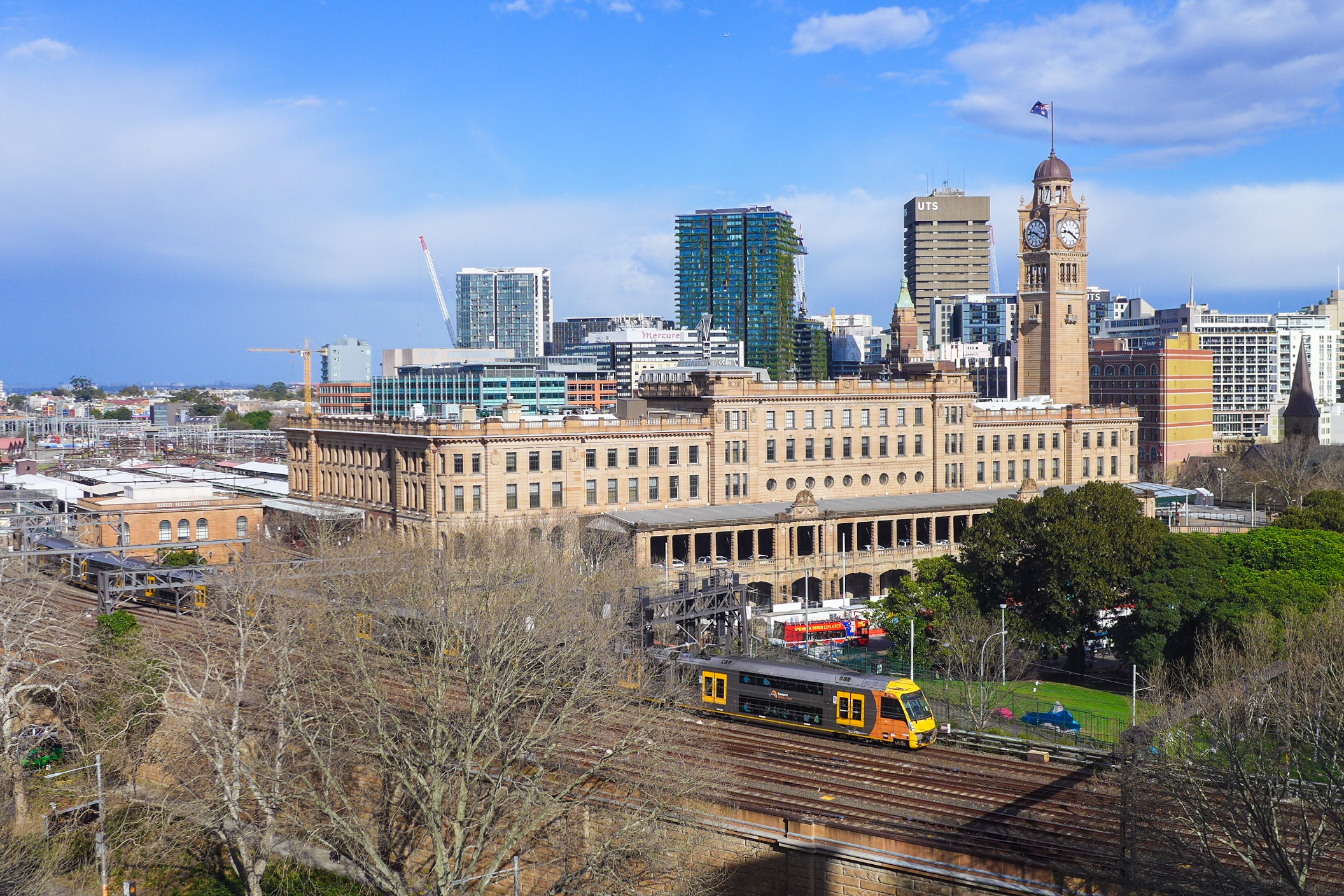
- Central railway station, Sydney

Overview
- Owner: Transport Asset Manager of New South Wales; Transport for NSW
- Locale: Sydney, New South Wales
- Transit type: Suburban rail Metro; Light rail Goods

Operation
- Began operation: 1855

Technical
- Track gauge: 1,435 mm (4 ft 8 1/2 in) standard gauge

Sydney, the largest city in Australia, has an extensive network of passenger and goods railways. The first railway line in Sydney opened in 1855, becoming part of the Main Suburban railway line and laying the foundation for future expansion.

An extensive suburban railway network is operated by Sydney Trains. A metro system began operation in 2019. Sydney's light rail system opened in 1996; it has reutilised former heavy rail corridors. A dedicated goods network also exists.

Central station is the main interchange for Sydney Trains suburban and intercity services, also serving NSW TrainLink’s regional, long distance and interstate trains, Sydney Metro and the light rail network. Journey Beyond's transcontinental Indian Pacific to Perth also departs from Central.

Sydney's suburban rail network is the busiest in Australia, with over 359 million journeys made in the 2017–18 financial year.

== Passenger services ==
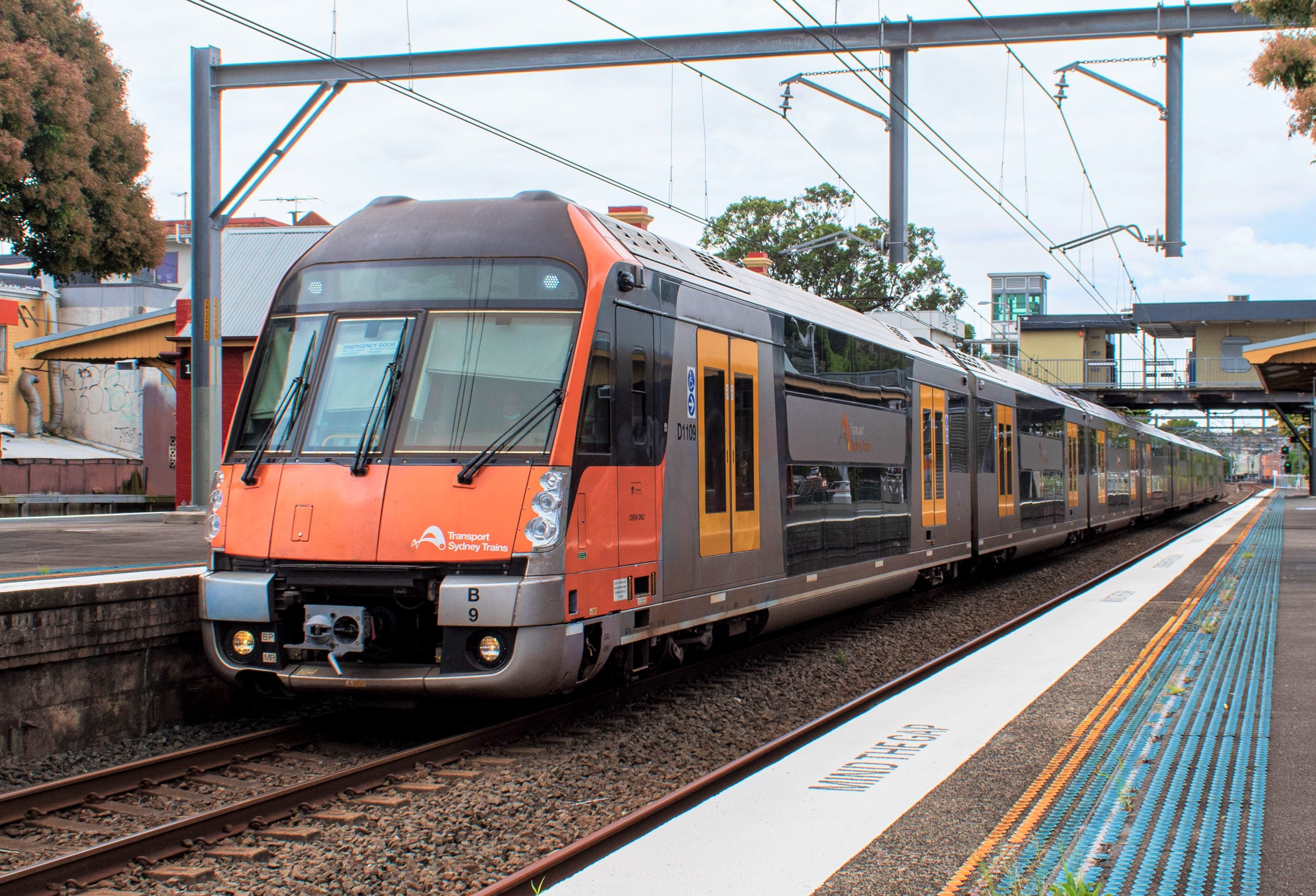
Sydney Trains

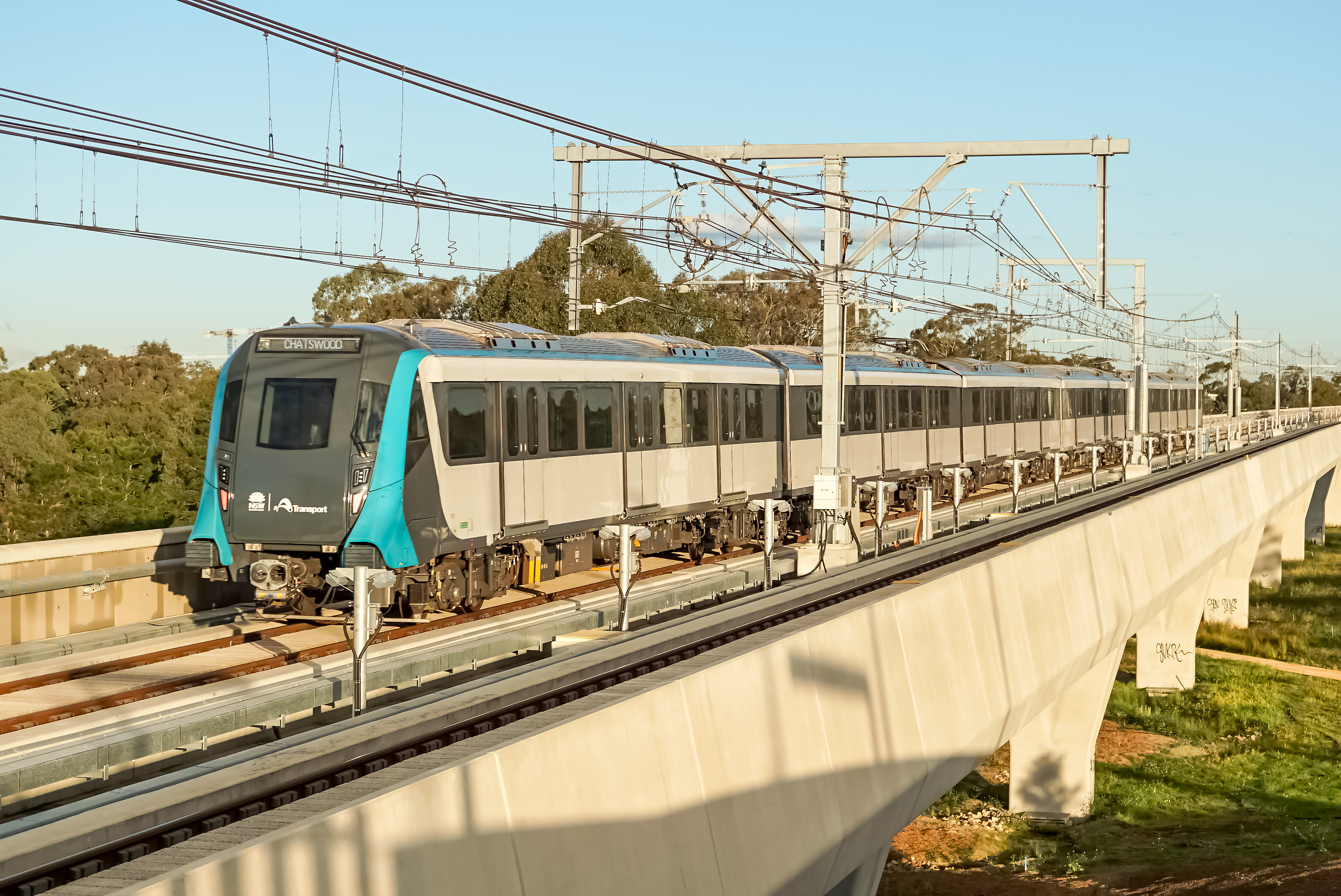
Sydney Metro

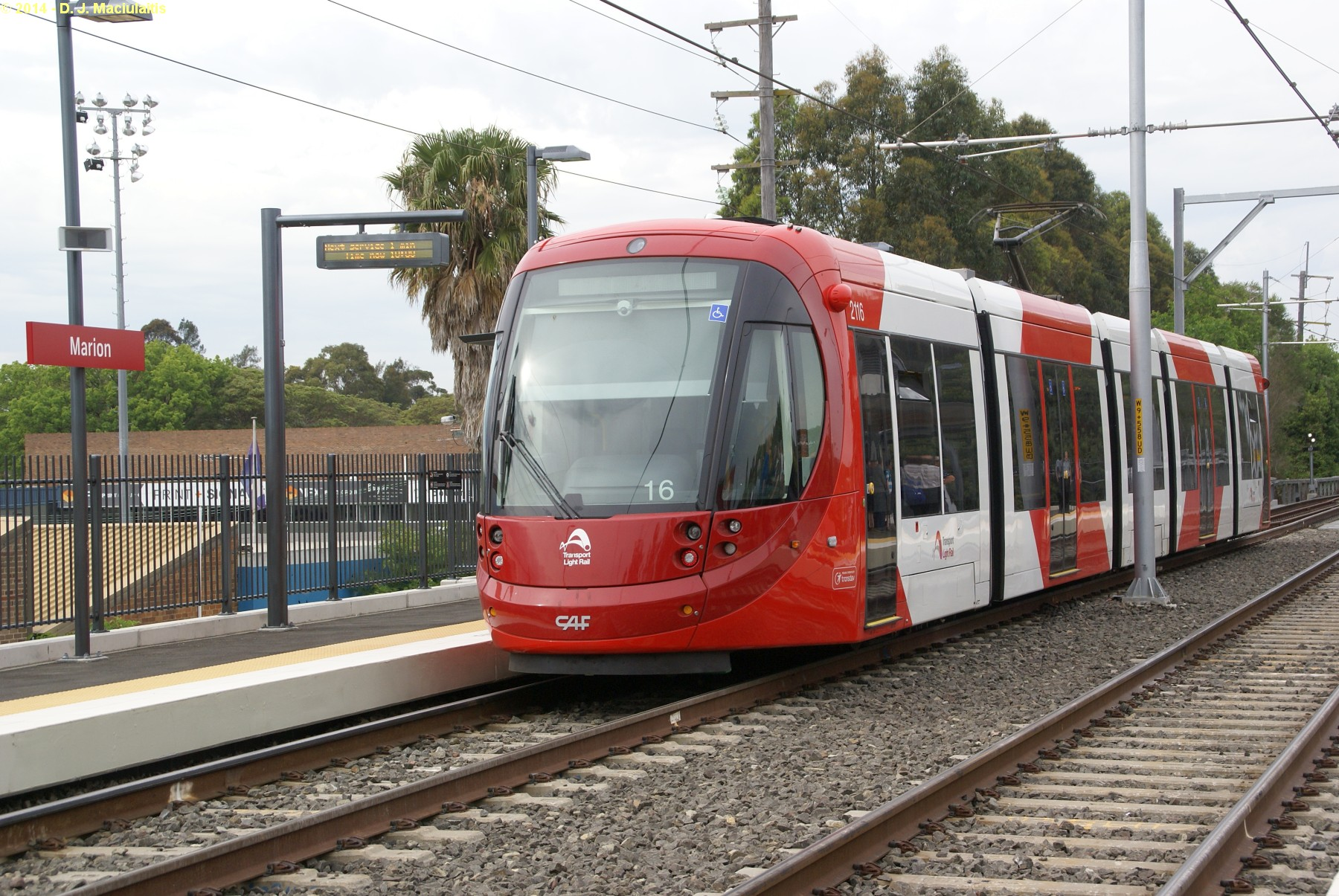
Sydney Light Rail

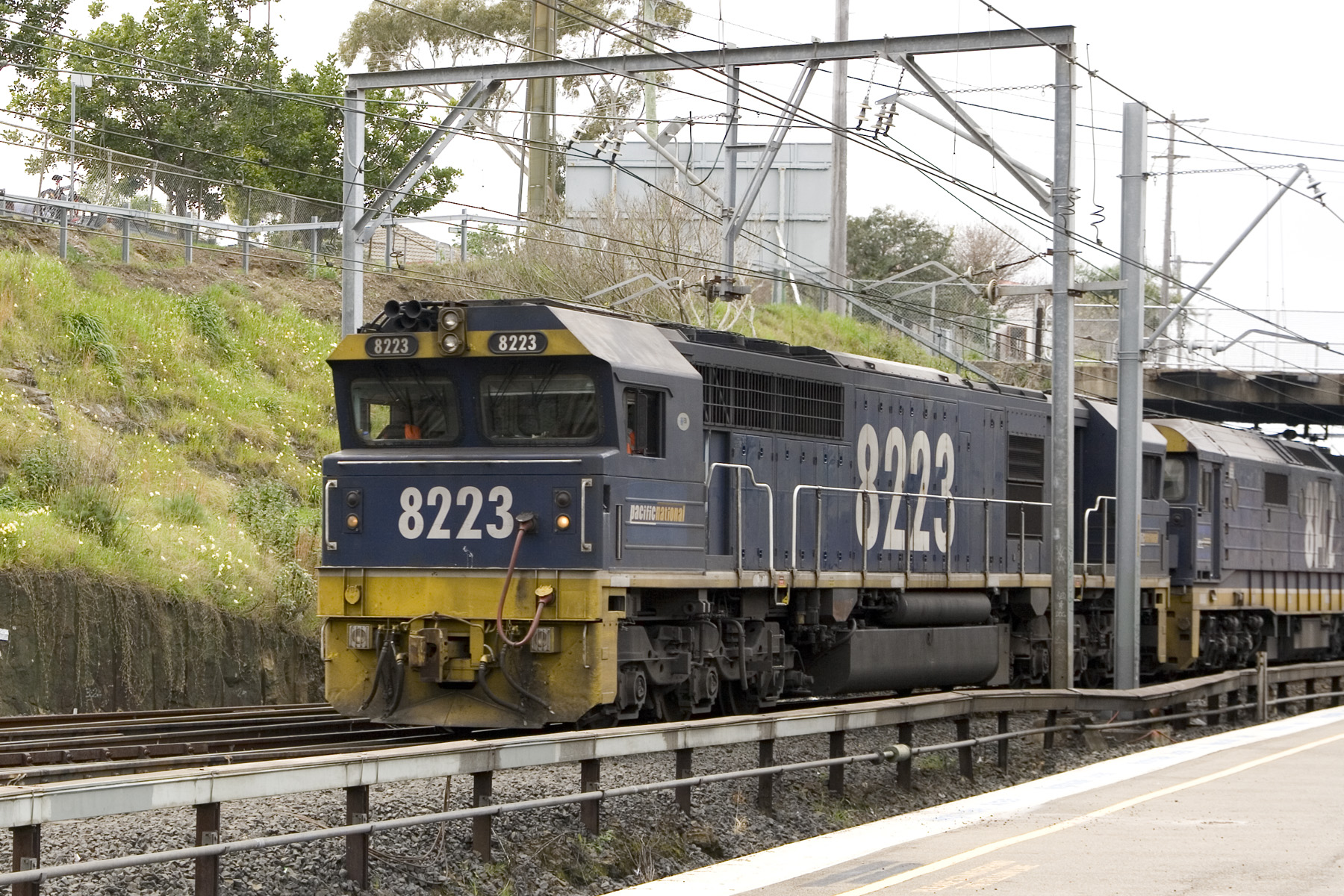
Sydney Freight Network

The Sydney Trains passenger rail network.

Suburban rail services in Sydney have been operated since 2013 by Sydney Trains. Over 1 million weekday passenger journeys are made, with 46,000 timetabled stops per weekday over 1,800 km (1,100 mi) of track and through 297 stations (including intercity lines). Most trains do not operate between midnight and 4.30am, with NightRide buses substituting for suburban services during this time. Suburban services operate along the portions of the main lines from Sydney to the north, west, south and south-west, and also along several dedicated suburban lines. All of these lines are electrified at overhead 1500 V DC, electrification having started in 1926. Some of the suburban stations are also served by the intercity and regional trains operated by NSW TrainLink, while some stations in the city centre and (imminently) Western Sydney provide interchanges with light rail.

Most suburban services operate through central Sydney via the underground City Circle (a two-way loop extending under the CBD from Central station), the Eastern Suburbs line, or over the Harbour Bridge. The Metro North West & Bankstown Line travels below the harbour and through the city centre.

Timetables are published for all lines, and most lines run on minimum frequencies of every 15 minutes from early morning to midnight, 7 days a week. Frequencies are higher during peak periods and over shared routes.

=== Rolling stock ===
All suburban passenger trains in Sydney are electric multiple units.

Upon electrification in the 1920s Sydney operated single-deck multiple units, but these were progressively withdrawn from the 1960s until their demise in 1993. Single-deck automatic trains are utilised by the Sydney Metro, which opened in May 2019.

Double-deck trailer carriages were delivered to the NSW Government Railways in the 1960s, and incorporated into sets with single-deck power cars. When coupled with the double decker trailer carriages, they formed the world's second double decker electric multiple unit trains after the unsuccessful trial of the 4DD on British Rail’s Southern Region.

=== Depots ===
Suburban trains are maintained at depots at Hornsby in the northern suburbs, Mortdale in the southern suburbs, and Flemington in the western suburbs. A depot at Punchbowl in the southwest closed in 1994 and has since been demolished. These four depots were all built and opened with the opening of electrified services in the 1920s.

Heavy maintenance of passenger cars was carried out at the Electric Carriage Workshops, Chullora and Suburban Car Workshops, Redfern. Heavy maintenance is now contracted out to Maintrain, a UGL Rail subsidiary, with workshops at Clyde.

== Freight services ==
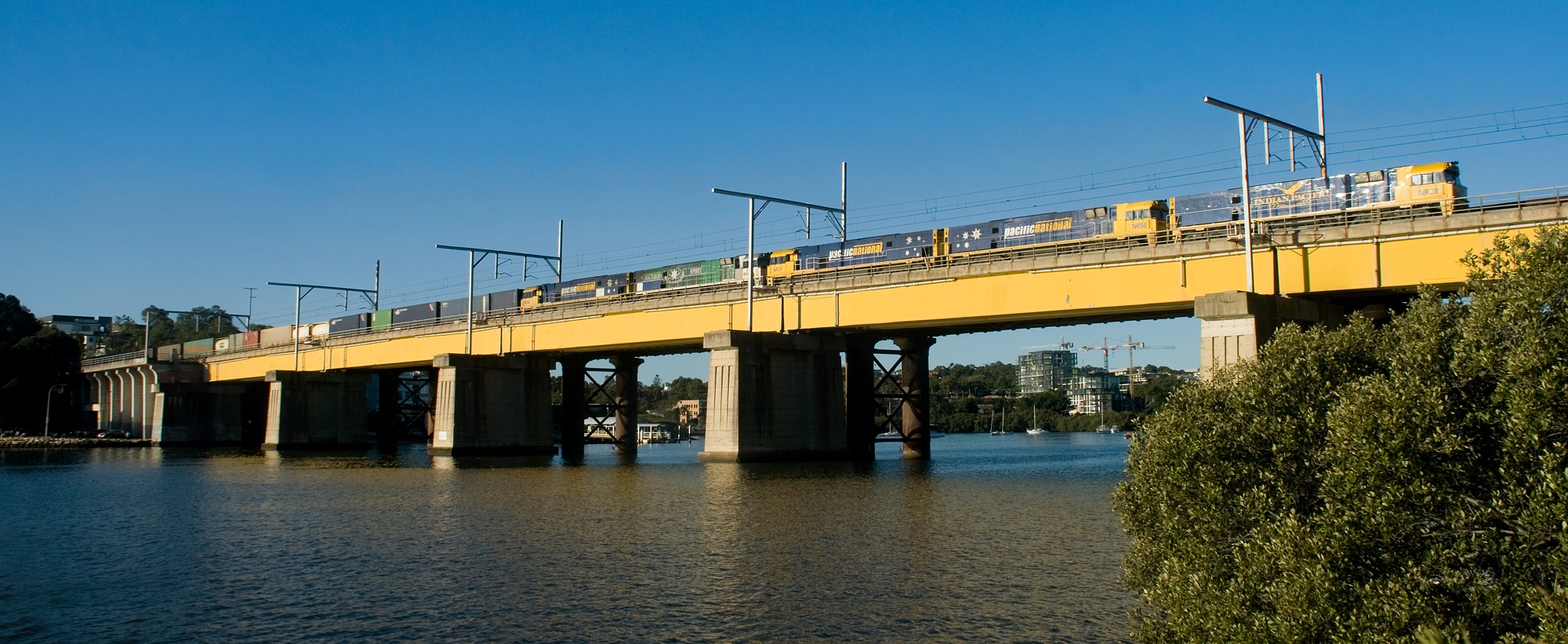
A goods train crossing the Meadowbank Bridge on shared tracks

Freight services operate over most of the suburban railway lines in Sydney, however due to the high frequency of passenger services and the lack of freight only tracks, there is a curfew on freight movements during peak hours.

The major interstate freight routes are the Main Southern and Main North lines, with the Illawarra and Main Western lines serving lineside industries and as alternate interstate routes. In the inner city area the Metropolitan Goods lines connects major freight terminals to the main passenger lines and the Southern Sydney Freight Line which runs parallel to the Main South line from the western end of the Metropolitan Goods lines to a point beyond the end of suburban services. The Northern Sydney Freight Corridor project along the Main Northern line between Sydney and Newcastle aimed at increasing the number of freight trains operating along the route, by separating passenger and freight traffic.

The main traffic is containerised freight. The main intermodal terminal are at Sydney Freight Terminal Chullora. Leightonfield, Yennora and Minto. Interstate trains to Sydney terminals are up to 1,500 metres (4,900 ft) long, while short-haul container trains from the terminals to the Port Botany seaport are around 600 metres (2,000 ft) long. Coal services to Port Kembla are another major traffic. Freight operators include Crawfords Freightlines, Pacific National, Qube Holdings and SCT Logistics.

== History ==
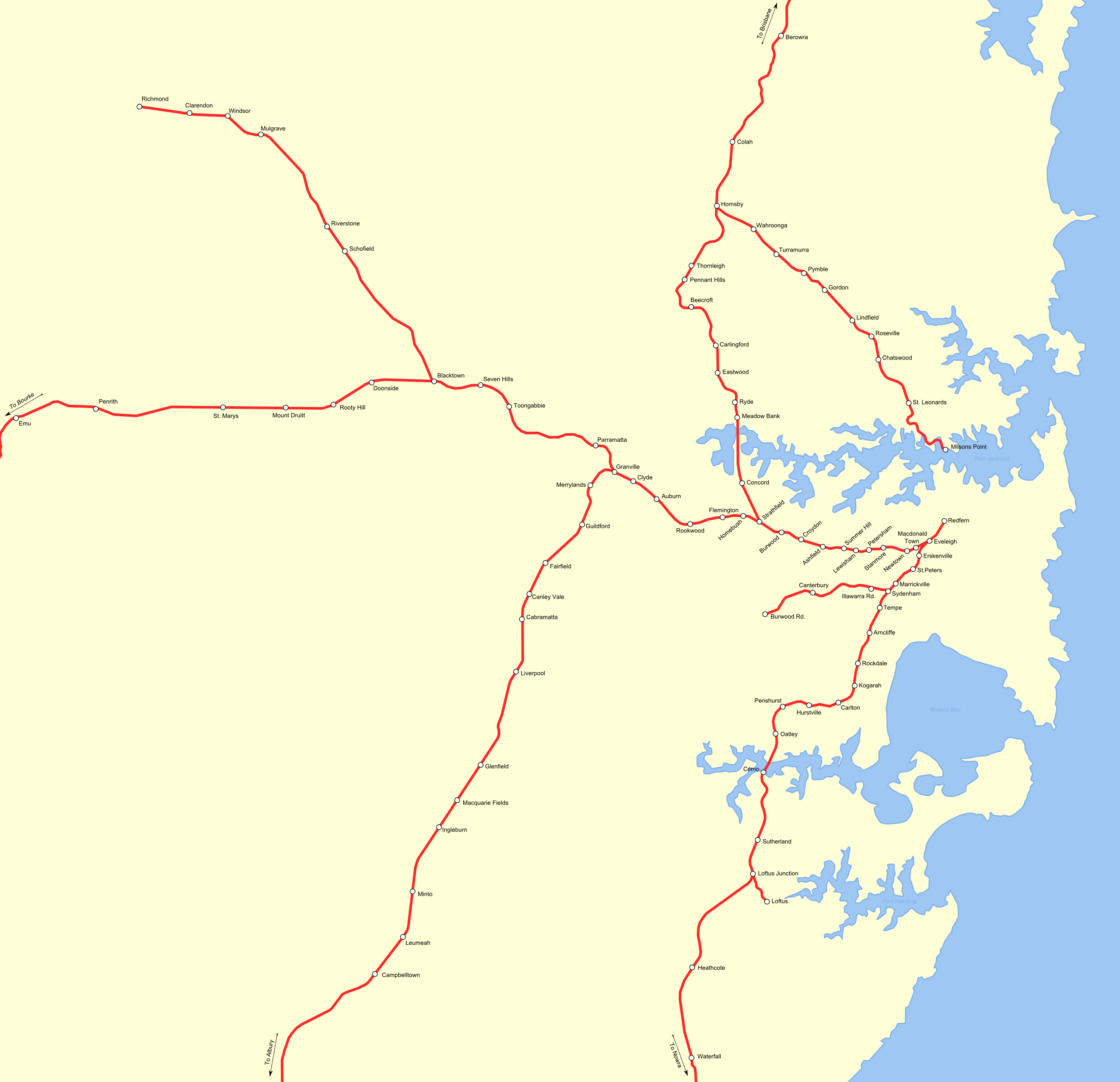
Sydney's rail system in 1894.

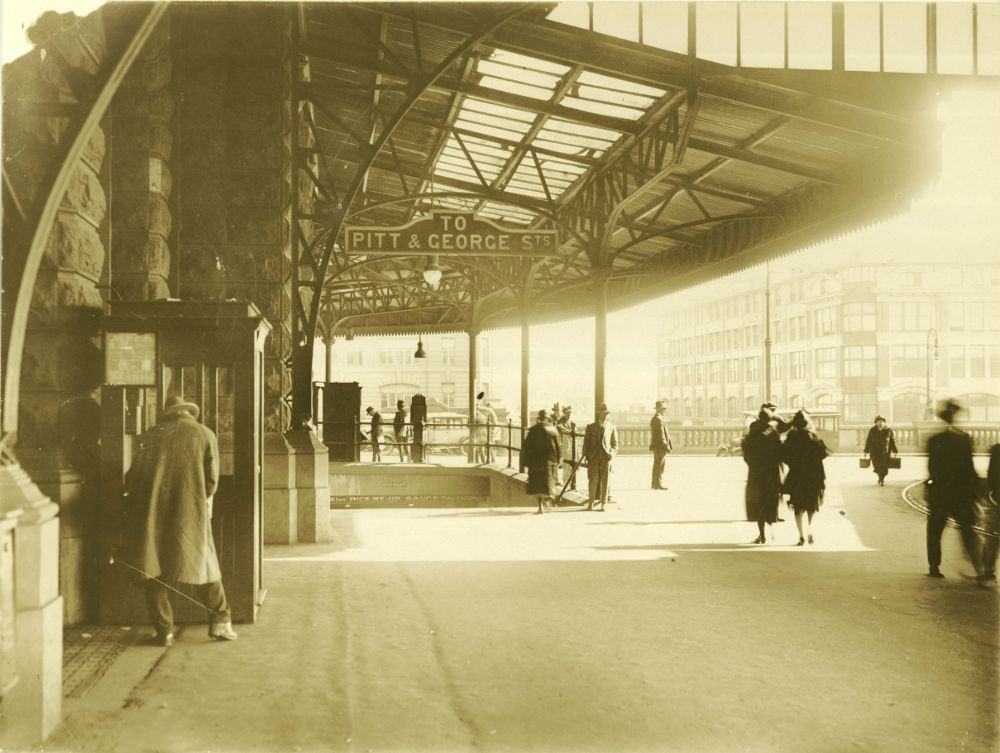
Central railway station in 1924. The Inner West Light Rail platform now exists here.

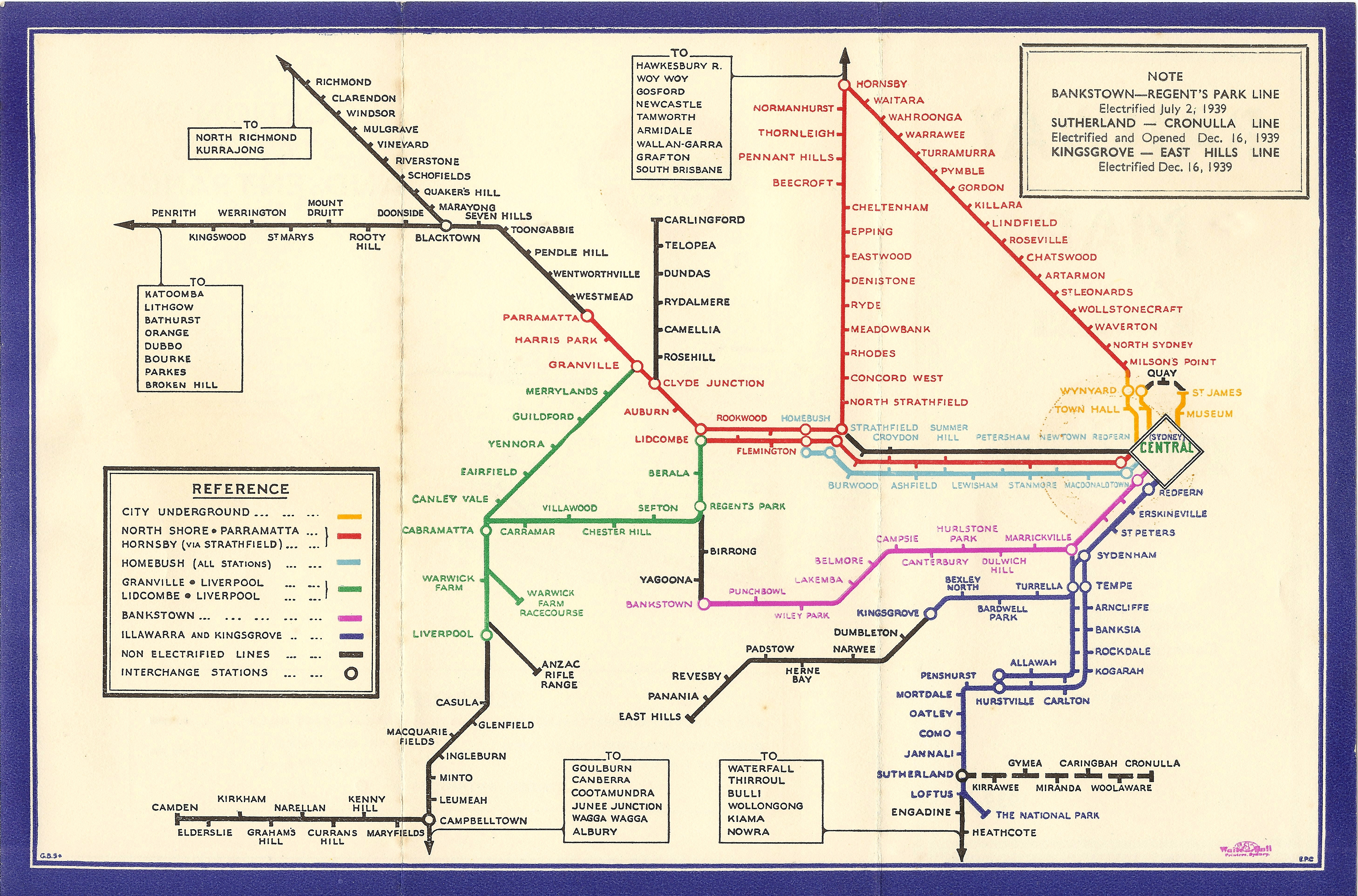
1939 network map

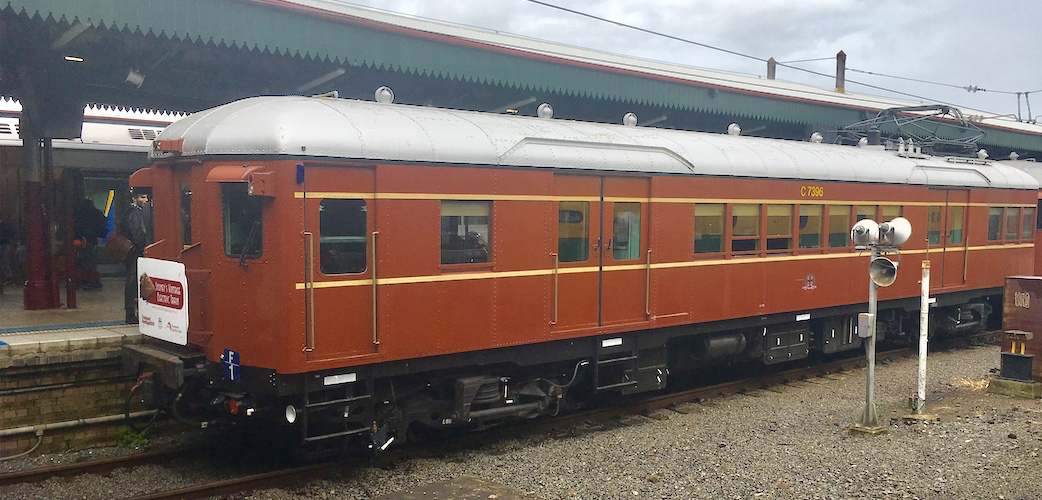
Set F1, a preserved pre-war Standard stock "Red Rattler".

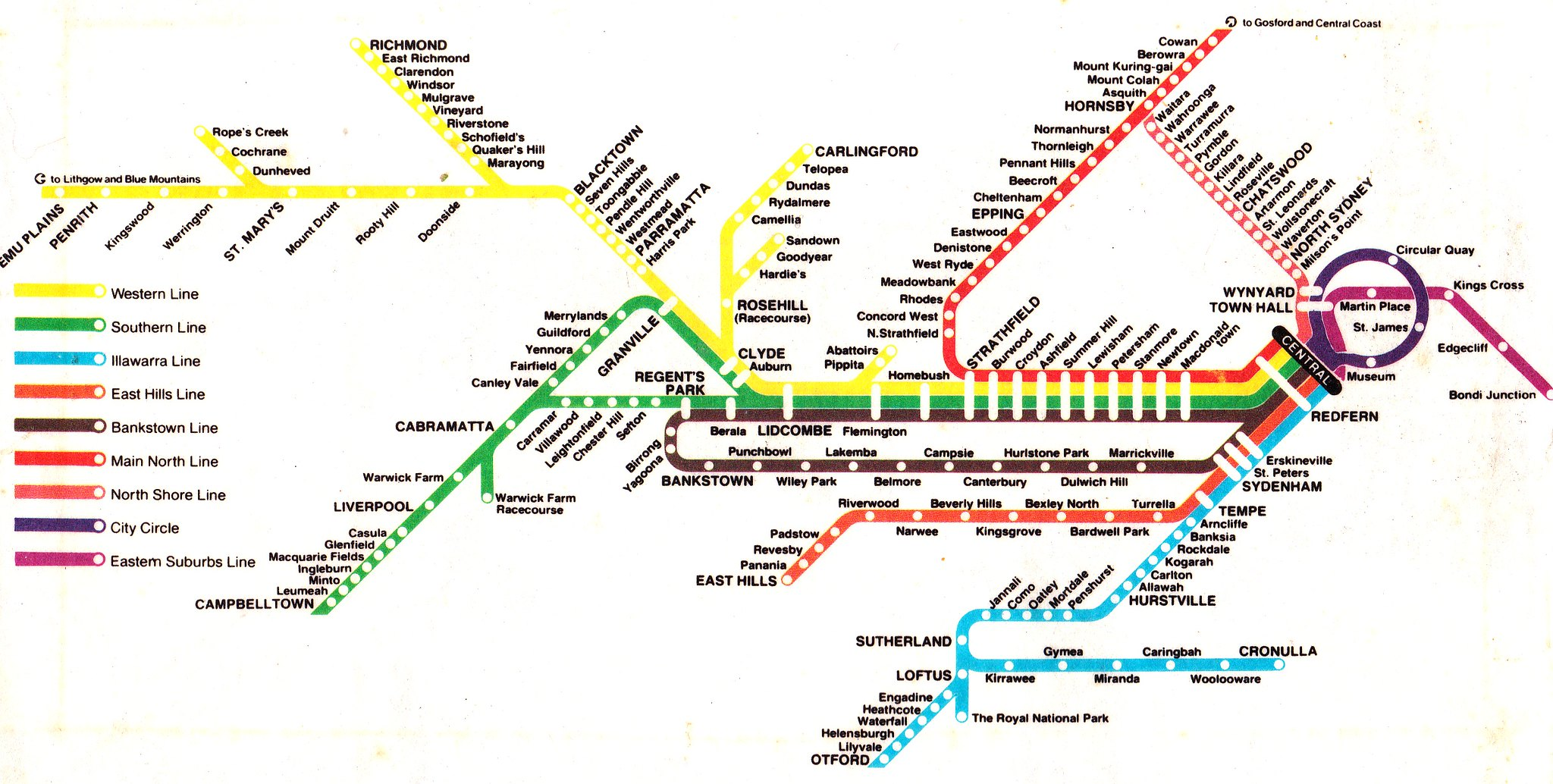
Sydney's suburban rail network map from the 1980s

The first railway in Sydney was opened in 1855 between Sydney and Granville, now a suburb of Sydney but then a major agricultural centre. The railway formed the basis of the New South Wales Government Railways. Passenger and freight services were operated from the beginning.

In 1886, the railway opened from Strathfield to Hornsby. The North Shore line opened in 1890 to St Leonards and then in 1893 to a harbour-side station at Milsons Point. More lines were being built at this time, and the suburban network expanded dramatically.

The railway system as it exists today is really the result of the vision and foresight of John Bradfield, one of Australia's most respected and famous civil engineers. He was involved in the design and construction of Sydney underground railways in the 1920s and 1930s, but he is more famous for the associated design and construction of the Sydney Harbour Bridge. Bradfield's vision for metro-style subways in Sydney was inspired by the metros London and New York City.

=== Electrification ===
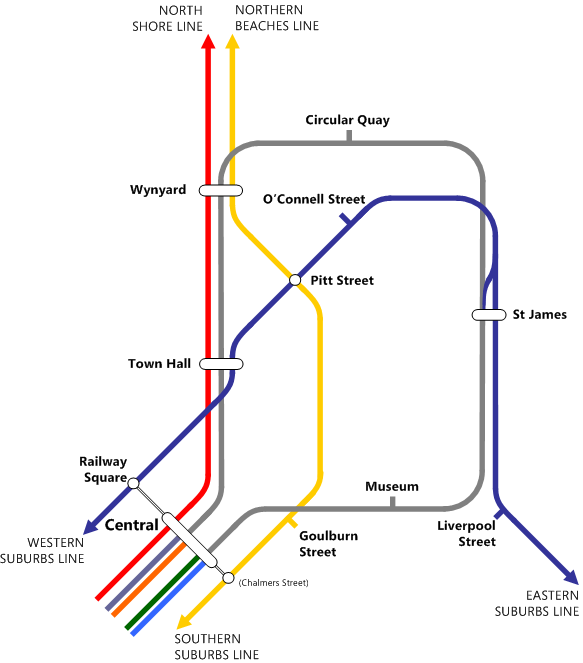
The original railway network for Sydney CBD planned by John Bradfield.

New South Wales uses an overhead electrification system at 1,500 volts direct current. Whilst inferior to and more expensive than modern single phase alternating current equipment, it was in vogue during the 1920s, having been used in Melbourne since 1919 and is generally sufficient for the operation of electric multiple unit trains. However, the introduction of powerful electric locomotives in the 1950s, followed by the Millennium train in 2002, revealed drawbacks in this antiquated system of electrification. As the voltage is relatively low, high currents are required to supply a given amount of power, which necessitates the use of very heavy duty cabling and substation equipment. Until the retirement of electric locomotives from freight service in the 1990s, it was often necessary to observe a "power margin" to ensure that substations were not overloaded. This situation was similar to that which applied to the Milwaukee Road's 3,000 VDC electrification. Plans to electrify the Hunter Valley at 25 kV alternating current were abandoned in the 1990s.

Electrification came to Sydney's suburbs on 9 December 1926 with the first suburban electric service running between Central station and Oatley on the Illawarra line. In the same year, the first underground railway was constructed north from Central station to St James in Sydney's central business district. Beginning on December 20, 1926, at 4:54 in the morning, the first underground railway service began in Australia. Electric trains that had previously terminated at Central station continued north, diving underground at the Goulburn Street tunnel portal, stopping at Museum station and then terminating at St James. Other lines were soon electrified. Also, in conjunction with the construction of the Sydney Harbour Bridge which opened in 1932, an additional four-track underground line was constructed from Central station to Town Hall and Wynyard. Two of the tracks continued over the Harbour Bridge connecting to the North Shore line.

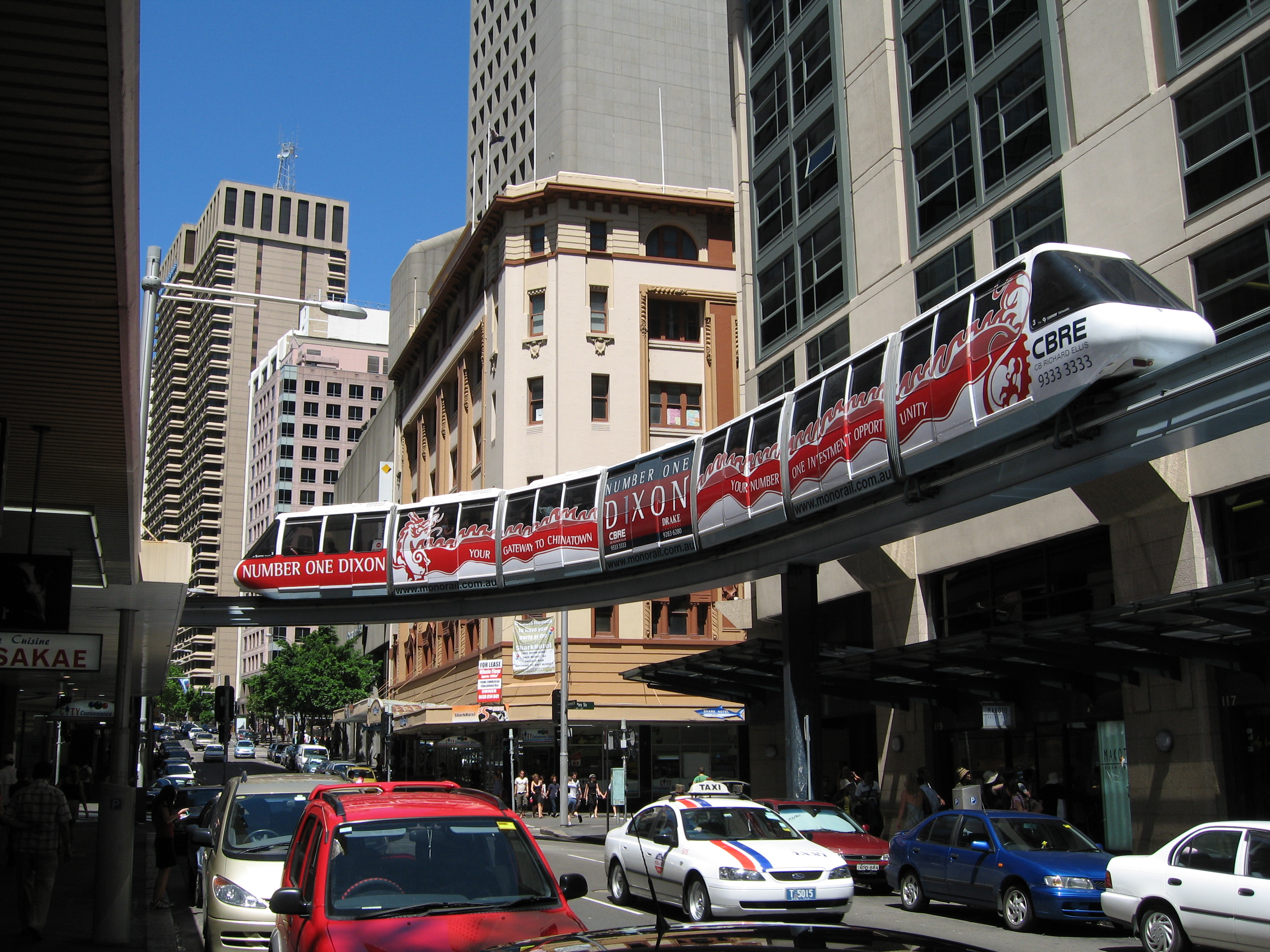
The Sydney Monorail. The monorail was shut down in 2013.

It was only in 1956 that the two tracks terminating at Wynyard were linked to the line terminating at St James via the Circular Quay viaduct. This new arrangement, dubbed the City Circle, allowed services to make a continuous run through the city and return to the suburbs without having to terminate.

==== Electrification timeline ====
Electrification of heavy rail lines proceeded as follows:

- 1926 – Illawarra line to Royal National Park, Bankstown line, City Circle
- 1927 – North Shore line
- 1929 – Western line to Parramatta
- 1929 – Northern line (Strathfield to Hornsby)
- 1929 – South line to Liverpool
- 1936 – Carlingford line from Clyde to Rosehill
- 1955 – Parramatta to Penrith
- 1957 – Penrith to Lithgow
- 1959 – Rosehill to Carlingford
- 1959 – Hornsby to Cowan
- 1960 – Cowan to Gosford
- 1968 – Liverpool to Campbelltown
- 1975 – Blacktown to Riverstone
- 1980 – Loftus to Waterfall
- 1982 – Gosford to Wyong
- 1984 – Wyong to Newcastle
- 1985 – Waterfall to Port Kembla.
- 1985 – Macarthur station opened
- 1991 – Riverstone to Richmond
- 1996 – Coniston to Dapto
- 2002 – Dapto to Kiama

New electrified suburban and metro lines were built:

- 1926 – line from Central to St James station and Museum opened
- 1931 – line opened to East Hills
- 1932 – line from Central to Town Hall, Wynyard, the Sydney Harbour Bridge, Milsons Point station and North Sydney station opened
- 1939 – Line to Cronulla built and connected with the Illawarra line at Sutherland
- 1956 – Circular Quay station opened completing the City Circle
- 1979 – Eastern Suburbs railway completed to Bondi Junction
- 1987 – East Hills – Glenfield line opened
- 1996 – Y-link built between Harris Park and Merrylands allowing the introduction of Cumberland Line services from Campbelltown to Blacktown
- 1998 – line from Flemington and Lidcombe to Olympic Park.
- 2000 – line to Sydney Airport and Wolli Creek built as a public-private partnership by the Airport Link Company
- 2009 – Epping to Chatswood railway line opened
- 2015 – South West Rail Link opened
- 2019 – Sydney Metro Northwest opened
- 2024 – Sydney Metro City opened

=== 21st century ===
The 2010s saw substantial investment in Sydney's railways. New suburban, metro and light rail lines have been constructed in the 2010s and 2020s, and a new focus emerged on urban rail in Australia. The Carlingford line and the Epping to Chatswood Rail Link, former parts of the suburban network, were subsumed by the Parramatta Light Rail and Metro North West & Bankstown Line respectively. Conversely, the Sydney Monorail was closed in 2013. In 2020, transport minister Andrew Constance stated that Sydney had become a “train city, it wouldn’t matter if it was light rail, metro or the inter-city trains.”

The goods system has also been expanded. The Southern Sydney Freight Line, an extension to the dedicated freight network from the end of the Metropolitan Goods line at Sefton to Macarthur, opened in 2013. The Northern Sydney Freight Corridor program saw the loop between North Strathfield and Rhodes duplicated with an underpass, opened in 2015, whilst a third track between Epping and Thornleigh was opened in 2016.

== Organisation ==
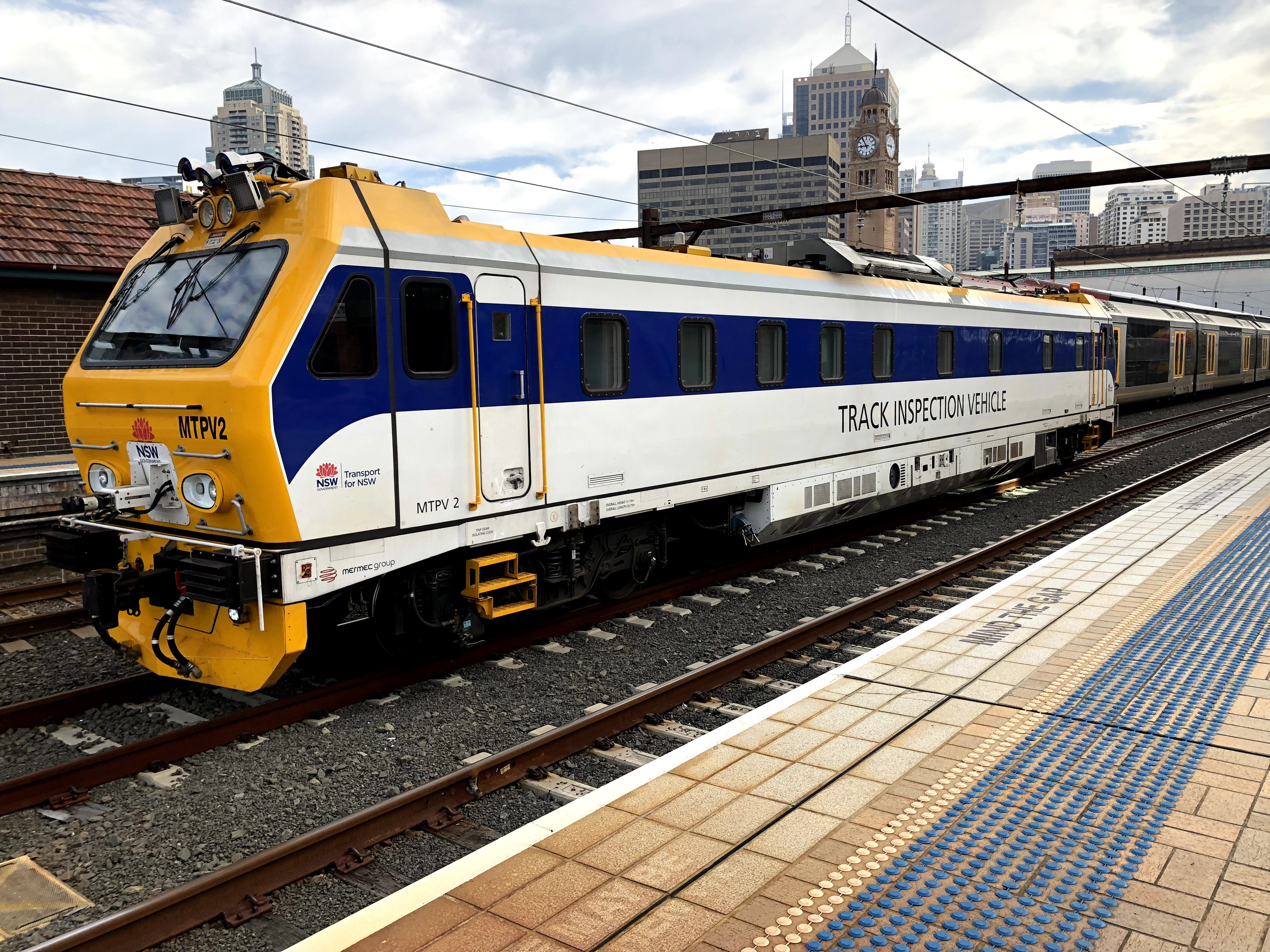
A track inspection train

The rail network in the metropolitan area of Sydney is owned, maintained and operated by Transport Asset Manager of New South Wales, a NSW State Government owned corporation. Third party access to their tracks by other freight operators is allowed under an open-access arrangement. Track outside the Sydney metropolitan area is operated and maintained by the Australian Rail Track Corporation. Suburban passenger trains within Sydney and intercity trains are operated by Sydney Trains, while regional trains that run through Sydney to and from farther destinations are operated by NSW TrainLink.

RailCorp was formed on 1 January 2004 by the merger of the State Rail Authority (SRA) and the metropolitan functions of the Rail Infrastructure Corporation (RIC). Until 1972, railways in NSW were operated by the Department of Railways New South Wales until this department was replaced by the Public Transport Commission (PTC), which was also responsible for bus and ferry services. In 1980 the PTC was broken up into the SRA, responsible for rail services, and the Urban Transit Authority (UTA), responsible for bus and ferry services. The UTA later became the State Transit Authority in 1989.

In 2001, the SRA had its 'above track' operations separated from its track ownership and maintenance operations. The track maintenance operations and track ownership were moved to the new RIC. However this separation into a horizontally operated rail system was criticised for the passing of blame for rail delays and accidents between authorities, and in 2004 railways in Sydney became a vertically operated system again with the creation of RailCorp, a fusion of the SRA and the urban sections of the RIC.

In July 2013, RailCorp was reduced to become the owner of the infrastructure and rolling stock, with the service provision that it operated under the CityRail and CountryLink brands transferred to Sydney Trains and NSW TrainLink.

== Gauge ==
With limited exceptions, all outside of Sydney, trains in New South Wales use standard gauge, with a distance of 1,435 mm (4 ft 8 1/2 in) between the rails.

== Terminology ==
The railways in Australia generally use British-derived terminology. 'Up' and 'down' mean towards and away from Central station respectively. 'TfNSW' refers to Transport for NSW, the public transportation body.

== Railway lines ==
=== Mainlines ===
Four main 'trunk' lines radiate from Sydney to the north, west, southwest and south:

- The Main Northern railway line (Great Northern Railway) from Strathfield to Armidale
- The Main Western railway line (Great Western Railway) from Granville to Dubbo
- The Main Southern railway line (Great Southern Railway) from Lidcombe to Albury
- The South Coast railway line from Illawarra Junction to Bomaderry

=== Other suburban lines ===
Other passenger lines branch from or interconnect with the four main lines:

- The Main Suburban railway line, from Redfern to Granville
- The Airport Link, an underground line linking the airport to the city
- The Bankstown railway line, from Bankstown to Lidcombe
- The City Circle, a mostly underground loop in central Sydney
- The Cronulla railway line, from Sutherland to Cronulla
- The East Hills railway line, from Tempe to Glenfield via East Hills
- The Eastern Suburbs railway line, a mostly underground line from Central to Bondi Junction
- The North Shore railway line, from Central to Hornsby via the Harbour Bridge
- The Old Main South railway line, from Granville to Cabramatta
- The Olympic Park railway line, a balloon loop line between Lidcombe and Olympic Park
- The Richmond railway line, from Blacktown to Richmond
- The South West Rail Link, from Glenfield to Leppington

=== Rapid transit lines ===
- The Metro North West & Bankstown Line, presently operating from Tallawong to Sydenham
  - Includes the converted Epping to Chatswood rail link, an underground line connecting the North Shore and Main Northern lines, and serving the Macquarie Park employment area

=== Light rail lines ===
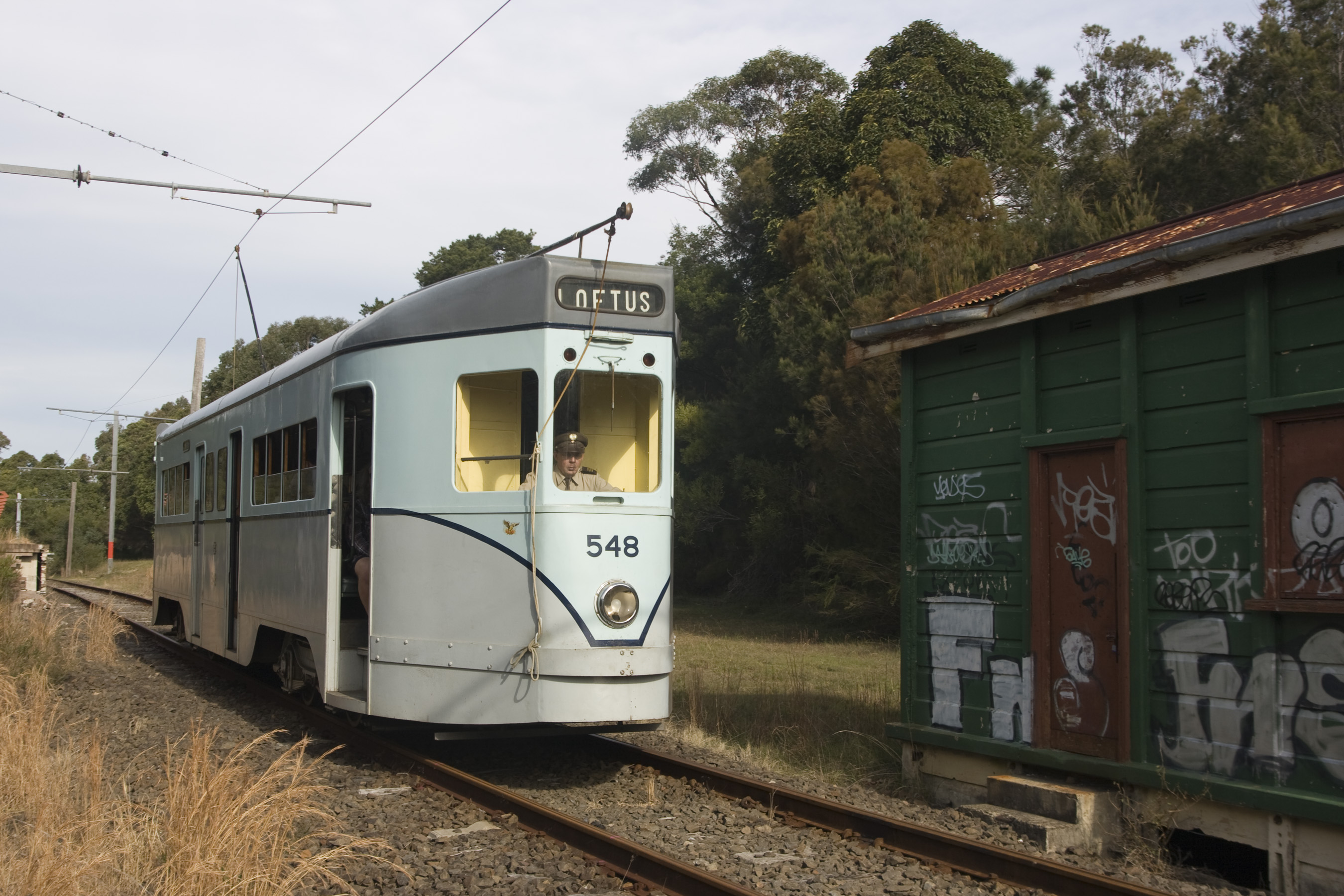
A former Brisbane tram departing Royal National Park station for the Sydney Tramway Museum in Loftus

Lines with light rail specifications:

- The Inner West Light Rail, from Central to Dulwich Hill
  - Mostly runs along the former Rozelle–Darling Harbour Goods Line
- CBD and South East Light Rail, from Circular Quay to Randwick and Kingsford
- The Parramatta Light Rail, from Westmead to Carlingford and in future to Sydney Olympic Park
  - Reutilises the Carlingford and Sandown railway lines
- The Royal National Park line, operated by the Sydney Tramway Museum, terminating at Royal National Park railway station. Previously operated as part of the South Coast railway line

=== Goods lines ===
Several railway lines carry goods only:

- The Metropolitan Goods Railway from Flemington/Sefton to Port Botany
- The Southern Sydney Freight Line between Macarthur and Sefton, where it connects with the Metropolitan Goods Line.

=== Closed lines ===
There are several closed lines in Sydney:

- The Camden railway line, from Campbelltown to Camden.
- The Carlingford railway line, from Clyde to Carlingford.
- The Holsworthy railway line from Liverpool to Holsworthy Barracks.
- The Potts Hill railway line in Potts Hill.
- The Richmond–Kurrajong railway line from Richmond to Kurrajong.
- The Rogans Hill railway line from Westmead to Rogans Hill.
- The Rookwood Cemetery railway line serving Rookwood Cemetery.
- The Ropes Creek railway line from St Marys to Ropes Creek.
- The Warwick Farm Racecourse line from Warwick Farm to Warwick Farm Racecourse.

Some former heavy rail lines, as mentioned above, have been converted to light rail.

=== Proposed and under construction ===
The following lines are under construction:

- Sydney Metro Western Sydney Airport, between St Marys and Western Sydney Airport.
- Sydney Metro West, between the Sydney CBD and Westmead via Inner West suburbs.

=== Underground sections ===
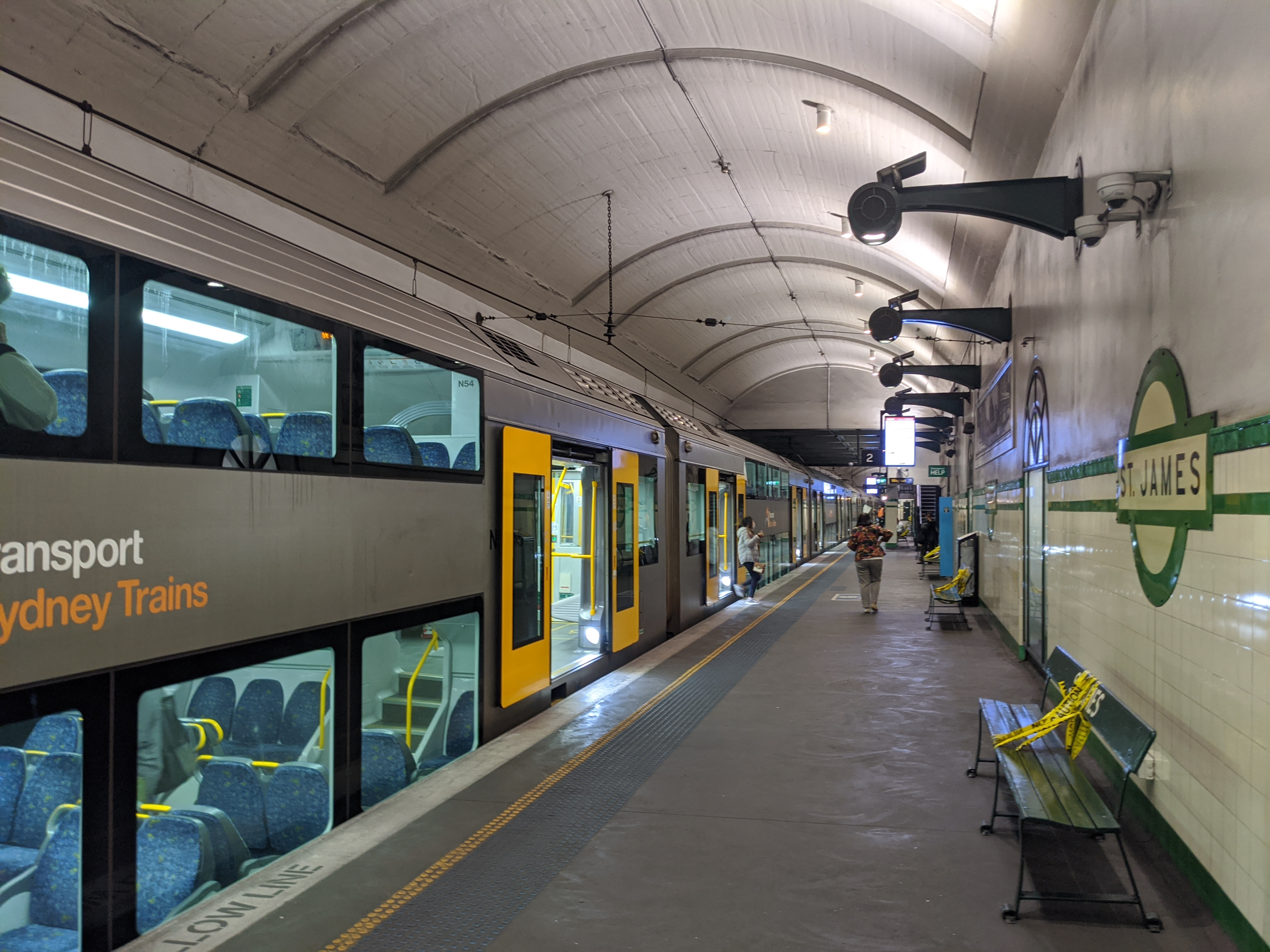
Platform 2 at St James station on the City Circle

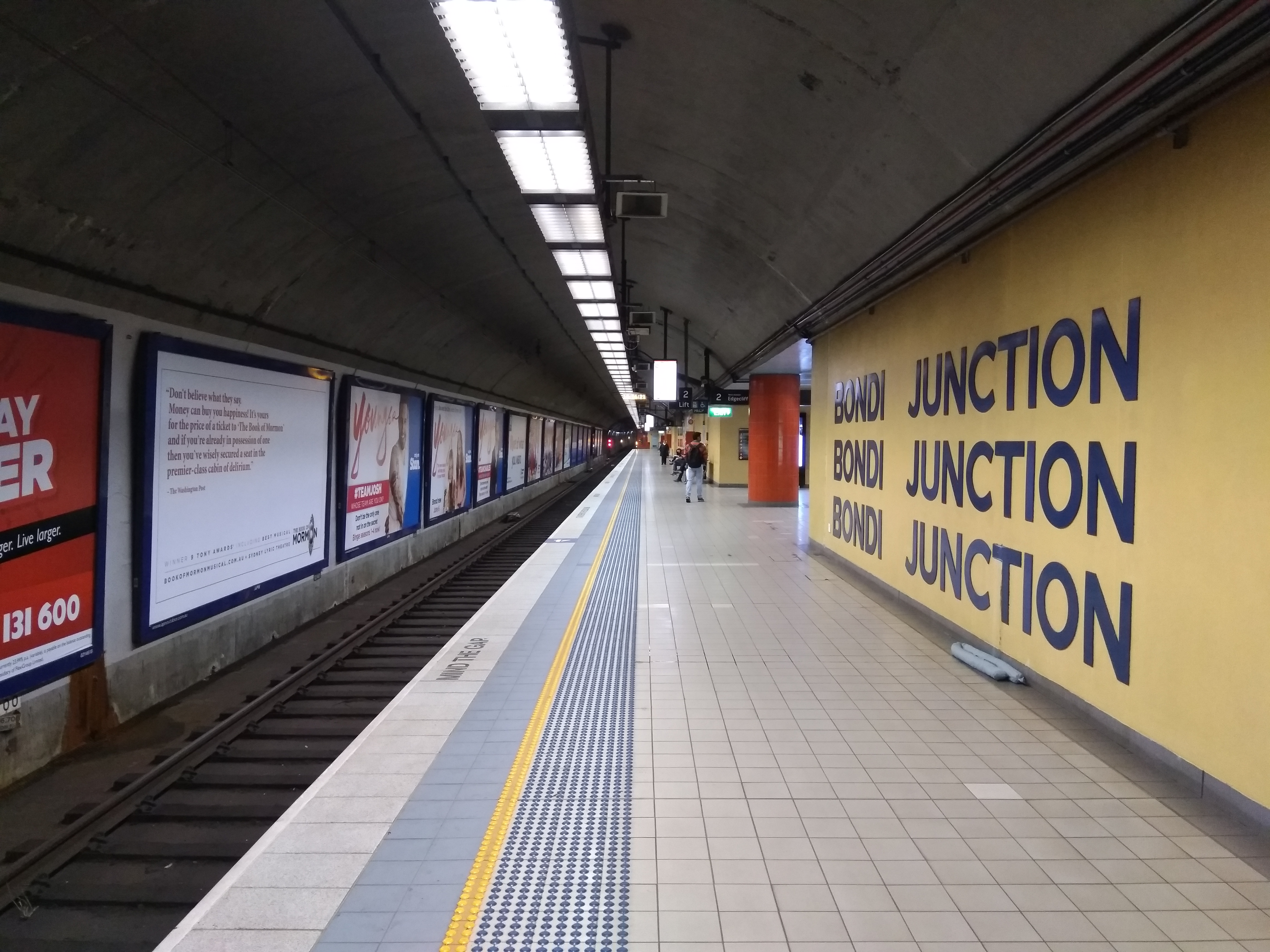
Bondi Junction station on the Eastern Suburbs line.

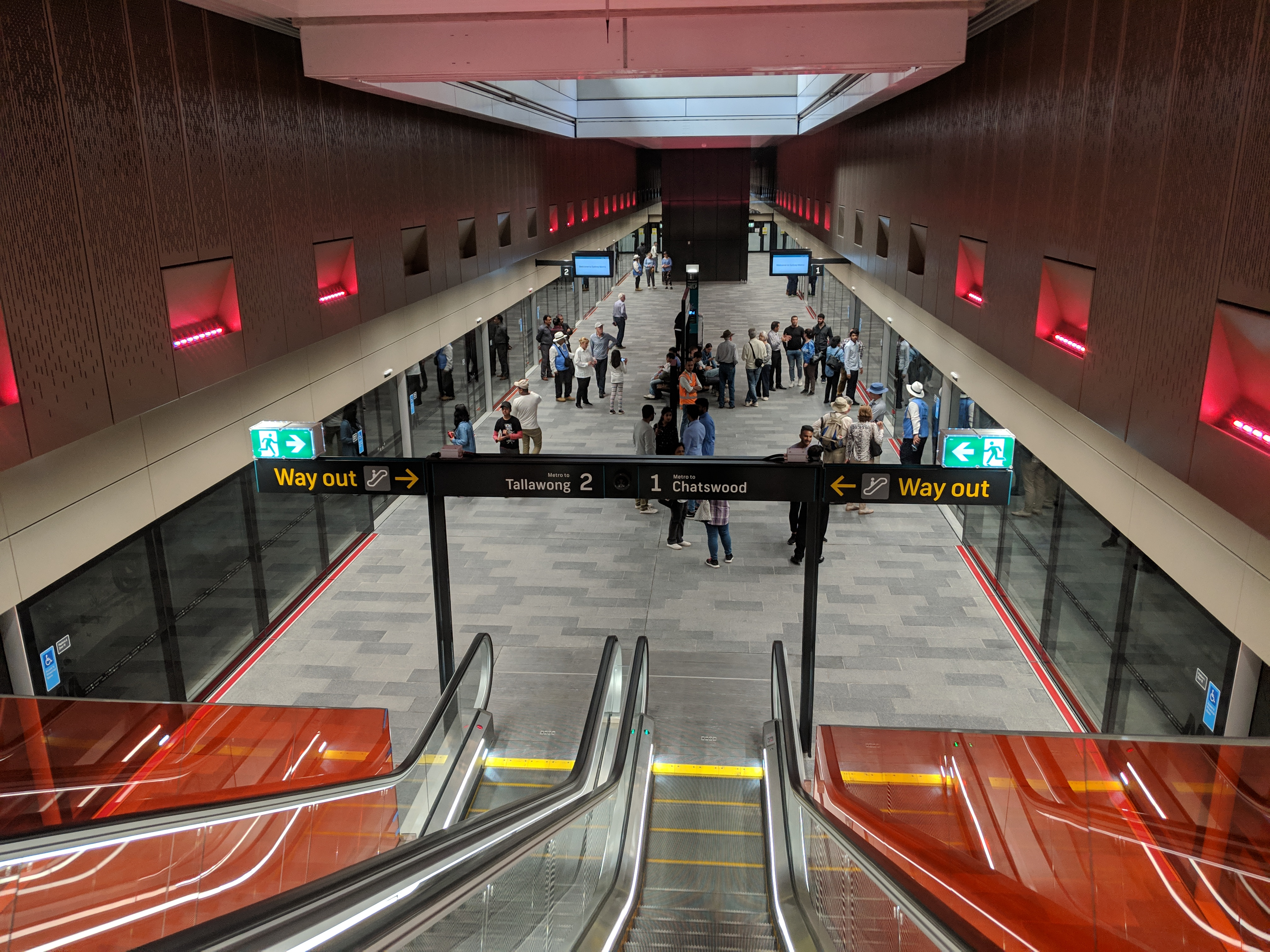
Hills Showground station on the Sydney Metro Northwest line.

Sydney has five underground lines. Three of these sections of railway are extensions of suburban main line commuter services, while two are part of a completely segregated metro system. The underground sections, especially the City Circle, typically have frequent services. Sydney Metro forms the largest part of Sydney's underground railways and the first true Metro system in an Australian city. Sydney Metro is atypical compared to classic metro systems such as the London Underground or the Paris Metro in that its stations are widely spaced, up to 6km apart, and it extends out of the inner urban area into less dense, suburban areas.

==== City Circle ====
The oldest underground line is the main city loop, the City Circle, which runs between Central, Town Hall, Wynyard, Circular Quay, St James and Museum stations. Central and Circular Quay are above-ground stations (Circular Quay is elevated, directly underneath the Cahill Expressway), while the remainder are below ground, meaning the underground segment of the City Circle consists of two branches, meeting at the approach to Central before surfacing. The line to St James station and Museum was opened in 1926, while the "western branch" of the City Circle through Town Hall and Wynyard opened in 1932, in conjunction with the opening of the Sydney Harbour Bridge. Circular Quay remained a "missing link" until 1956, when it connected the ends of the two underground branches via an elevated track.

The North Shore railway line runs underground adjacent to the City Circle between Central and Wynyard, then runs over the Sydney Harbour Bridge.

==== Eastern Suburbs line ====
The Eastern Suburbs line opened in 1979. It runs between Redfern, Central, Town Hall, Martin Place, Kings Cross, Edgecliff, Woollahra (Unused Platforms) and Bondi Junction stations. All these are underground, but there are three above-ground sections, two on viaduct and one in cutting, with four separate tunnel sections, the main section extending from before Redfern to after Martin Place, while the other three are centred on each of the three Eastern Suburbs stations. Most of the platforms at Redfern and Central stations are above ground, including the platforms for the City Circle, but the Eastern Suburbs line is underground. At the time of its construction, the line had been intended to finish at Kingsford but it was curtailed at Bondi Junction for political and financial reasons. In the late 1990s, there were plans to extend the line to Bondi Beach, but these have since fallen through.

==== Airport line ====
The Airport line opened in 2000, prior to the Sydney Olympics. This serves Central, Green Square, Mascot, Domestic Airport (underneath the Domestic terminals), International Airport (underneath International terminal at Sydney Airport), and Wolli Creek. After Wolli Creek it joins the above-ground East Hills line at Turrella.

==== Metro Northwest ====
The fourth underground line is a part of Sydney Metro Northwest, which was built in two stages. The first stage was originally constructed as part of the suburban rail system as the Epping to Chatswood rail link, opened in 2009. It links the centre above ground platforms at Chatswood to new underground platforms at Epping, via new underground stations at Macquarie University, Macquarie Park and North Ryde. The line as-built surfaced after Epping to connect to the Northern line, and was intended to continue from Epping to Parramatta, incorporating the existing Carlingford line, but this section was postponed during the railway's construction because of financial reasons. Stub tunnels were constructed at the northern end of Epping station in the event that work on the remainder of the line ever resumed. These stubs were instead used to connect to new tunnels for the Northwest Metro, which opened in 2019, ending the possibility of extending the railway to Parramatta as a commuter rail line. The Epping to Chatswood Rail Link was converted for operation as an automated rapid transit system, with the links to the suburban system at Chatswood and Epping removed. The new tunnels are made up of two segments, extending from Epping to the above ground Cherrybrook station, and from Cherrybrook to the above ground Bella Vista station, via underground stations at Castle Hill, Hills Showground, and Norwest. The line continues past Bella Vista above ground and by viaduct.

==== Metro City ====
The fifth underground line is a part of Sydney Metro City & Southwest, with the tunnelled section from Chatswood to Sydenham opening in 2024. These tunnels, which pass under Sydney Harbour, connect the above ground Metro platforms at Chatswood and Sydenham via underground stations/platforms at Crows Nest, Victoria Cross, Barangaroo, Martin Place, Gadigal, Central, and Waterloo.

==== Future underground lines ====
Two underground lines are under construction as part of Sydney Metro as of 2024.

- The Metro Western Sydney Airport line will consist of two underground sections, one from underground platforms at St Marys station to the above ground Orchard Hills station, and the other from after Airport Business Park to the underground Bradfield station, via the underground station at Airport Terminal.
- The full length of the 24 kilometre Metro West line will be underground, with underground stations at Hunter Street, Pyrmont, Five Dock, Burwood North, North Strathfield, Olympic Park, Parramatta Square and Westmead.

==== Disused tunnels ====
Sydney has several disused tunnels. The best known of these are those leading out of St James station. There are also several disused tunnels and platforms on the Eastern Suburbs line, which like St James station provided for the possibility of four tunnels even though only two are in use. There is a stub tunnel at North Sydney railway station, north of platform 2, for a never constructed Manly to Mona Vale line.

From the top of the northern stairs to platform 10 at Redfern station it is possible to view the unfinished structure for the low-level "up" (toward Central) Southern Suburbs platforms. The associated never-used tunnels are quite complex. Immediately to the left is the (surface level) stub tunnel for the "down" Southern Suburbs track. This short tunnel exits on the northern side of Lawson Street road bridge. There are at least nine railway tunnels under the suburb of Redfern: some in use, some never used.

What was originally intended to be Platforms 26 and 27 at Central was constructed as part of the Eastern Suburbs Railway. Lying above the active Eastern Suburbs platforms, they have never been used for trains, and they now house communications and power rooms for the deeper Sydney Metro platforms, which took their numbering as platforms 26 and 27. Like St James station, the abandoned platforms at Redfern and Central have stub tunnels, although they are much shorter.

There are several tunnels on the old Rozelle–Darling Harbour Goods Line, most of which are now used by the Inner West Light Rail. One runs underneath Railway Square, near the Central station railway yards. For a time, this section of the line was used to service the Powerhouse Museum. The corridor adjacent to the tunnel is now a pedestrian pathway, the tunnel itself is disused. A pair of tunnels run underneath Pyrmont and Glebe and are now part of the light rail line. The third tunnel was created in 2000 when an extension to the City West Link Road through Leichhardt was built on top of a cutting. This is also now used by the light rail.

== See also ==
- Rail transport in New South Wales
  - Rail rollingstock in New South Wales
  - Proposed railways in Sydney
- Trams in Sydney
- Rail transport in Australia
