= Ultimo Road railway underbridge =

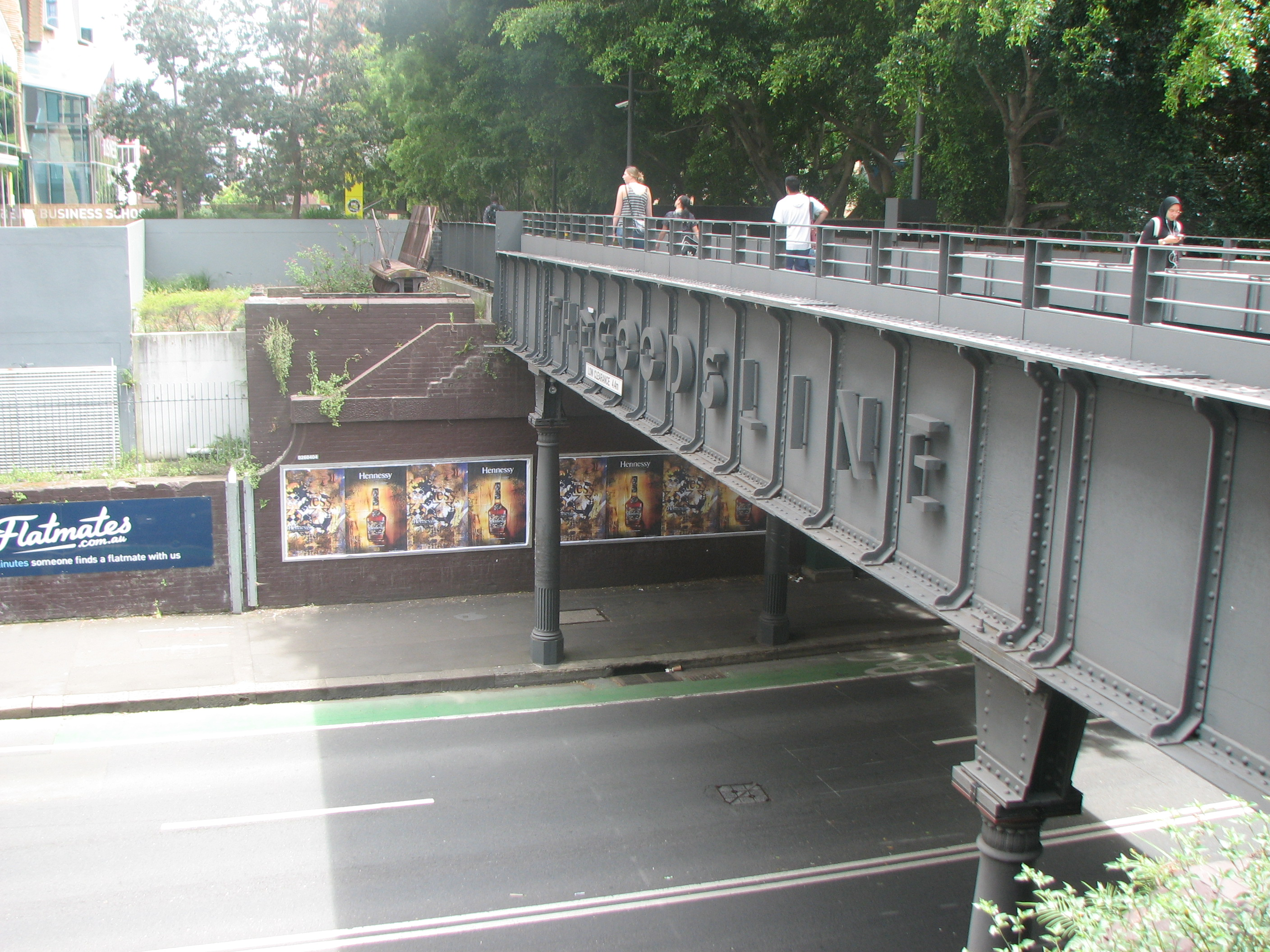
- Ultimo Road railway underbridge
- Coordinates: 33°52′52″S 151°12′06″E
- Carries: Darling Harbour goods railway (1879–1996); The Goods Line (since 2005)
- Crosses: Ultimo Road
- Locale: Ultimo, City of Sydney, New South Wales, Australia
- Owner: Transport Asset Manager of New South Wales

Characteristics
- Design: Girder bridge
- Material: Wrought iron
- Pier construction: Cast iron
- Total length: 21.64 metres (71 ft)
- Longest span: 13.72 metres (45 ft)
- No. of spans: 3
- Clearance below: 4.4 metres (14 ft)

Rail characteristics
- No. of tracks: Two (covered over with steel plates)
- Track gauge: 4 ft 8 1/2 in (1,435 mm) standard gauge

History
- Engineering design by: New South Wales Government Railways
- Constructed by: NSW Public Works Department
- Construction end: 1879
- Closed: 1996 (regular traffic); 2005 (repurposed for pedestrian use as The Goods Line)

New South Wales Heritage Register
- Official name: Ultimo Road Railway Underbridge
- Type: State heritage (built)
- Designated: 2 April 1999
- Reference no.: 1062
- Type: Railway Bridge/Viaduct
- Category: Transport – Rail

Location
- Interactive map of Ultimo Road railway underbridge

The Ultimo Road railway underbridge is a heritage-listed former railway bridge located on the former Darling Harbour goods railway line in the inner city Sydney suburb of Ultimo in the City of Sydney local government area of New South Wales, Australia. It was designed by engineering staff in the Existing Lines branch of the New South Wales Public Works Department and built in 1879. The property is owned by Transport Asset Manager of New South Wales, an agency of the Government of New South Wales. It was added to the New South Wales State Heritage Register on 2 April 1999.

The underbridge now forms part of The Goods Line, a pedestrian walkway which runs from Central station to the corner of Sussex and Hay Streets, Sydney.

== History ==
The original rail access to the Darling Harbour area was completed as a single line in September 1855 via a tunnel-like construction called the "Darling Harbour Dive" ('diving' under George Street). The line crossed over Ultimo Road on a timber beam bridge. This construction was completed before John Whitton arrived in 1856 to become the long-serving Engineer-in-Chief for railways in NSW. Since the line was an existing, operating line, it became the responsibility of the Existing Lines branch, Public Works Department.

By the 1870s goods traffic had increased so much that duplication of the line was planned. This work was completed in 1874 and replacing the timber bridge with a wrought-iron girder bridge followed in 1879 under the direction of George Cowdery, Chief Engineer, Existing Lines branch.

The arrangement of main girders is unusual. Whereas a double-track bridge conventionally has two outer main girders with cross-girders to carry both tracks, Cowdery's designer chose to use an additional main girder between the tracks such that the bridge looks like two single-track bridges sharing a common centre main girder. It is a triple-girder, plate-web girder bridge.

However, the design was inadequate to accommodate the ever-increasing weights of locomotives and rolling stock, so rather than install a new, stronger bridge, the span was reduced c. 1900 by inserting cast-iron columns on the kerb lines of Ultimo Road.

The line continued to be the main access to Darling Harbour but frequent traffic congestion at the Cleveland Street tunnel led to the building of the Metropolitan Goods Lines network, which reached the northern end of Darling Harbour in 1922 (hence much less traffic used the Darling Harbour Dive).

Sixty years later the Darling Harbour Goods Yard was closed and the area underwent a major redevelopment. The northern railway was made available to the light railway and the southern connection was reverted to a single line to give access to the Powerhouse Museum. The 1879 wrought-iron girder bridge has continued in service throughout these changes. The bridge is no longer in use, having been closed to service in c. 2005.

== Description ==
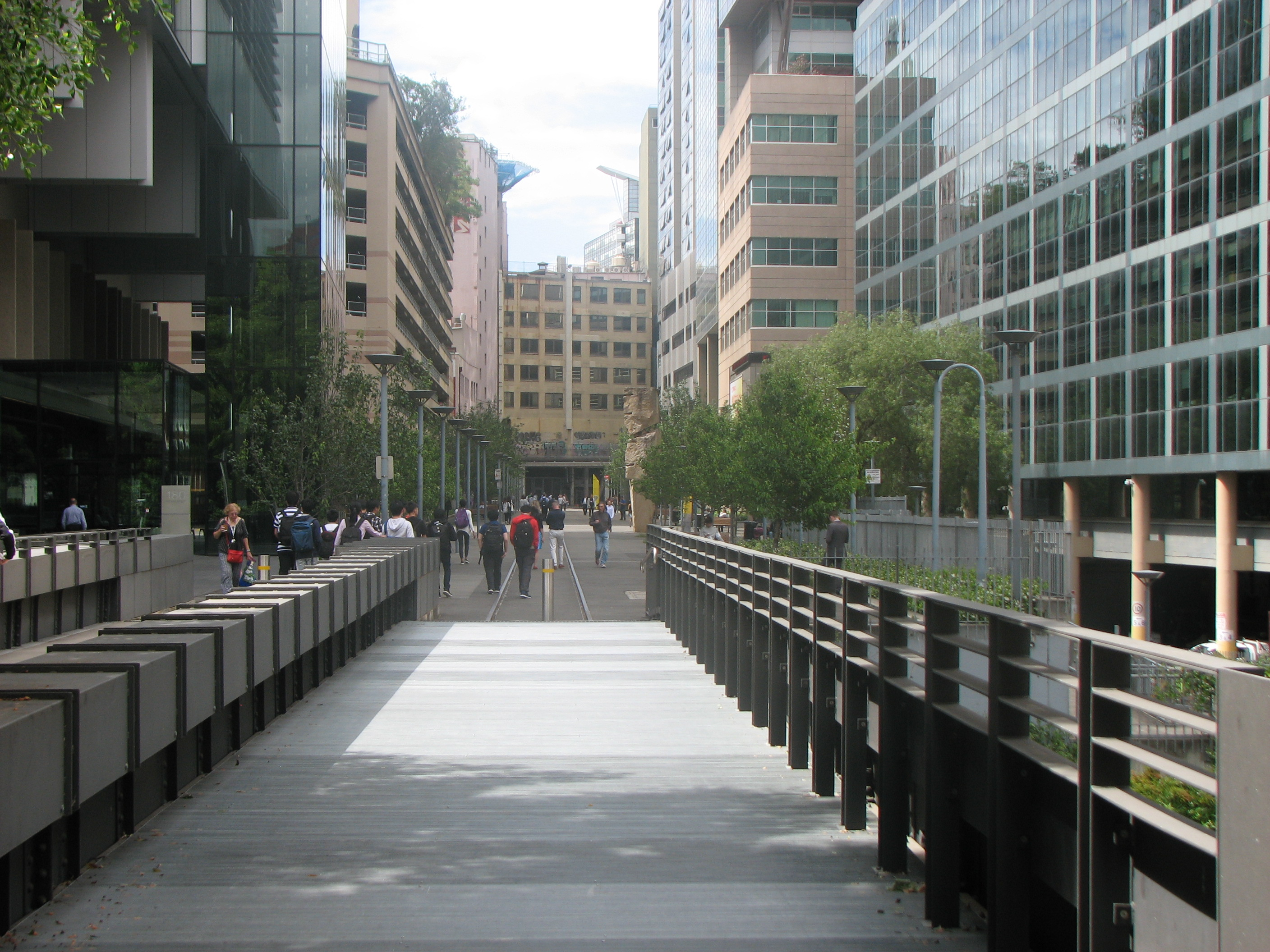
Pedestrians walk along the bridge as part of The Goods Line.

The 1879 underbridge over Ultimo Road consists of cast-iron columns supporting wrought iron riveted plate web girders and wrought iron cross beams. Structurally it is a half-through, triple-girder bridge, the centre girder is located between the two tracks. Brick abutments are located on the north and south side of Ultimo Road and add extra support to the underbridge.

Originally a single span of 21.64 metres (71 ft), cast iron columns were added on the kerb lines to give three spans, 3.96 metres (13 ft) over each footpath and a centre span of 13.72 metres (45 ft).

=== Condition ===
Moderate condition with rust appearing on column heads and on underside cross beams and girders. The running surface and tracks have been covered with a steel cover plate which is rusted through in places. There is some graffiti on the plate web girder.

On 8 January 2012 the underbridge was assessed as being in a moderate condition with rust appearing on column heads and on underside cross beams and girders. The running surface and tracks have been covered with a steel cover plate which is rusted through in places. There is some graffiti on the plate web girder. On 31 March 2010 a structural assessment was undertaken to advise whether the bridge can be used for pedestrian and cycle use. The conclusion is that this is possible providing the existing deteriorated deck is replaced by one of lightweight construction and that the public are not allowed on the eastern side of the bridge whilst the western side is being trafficked by locomotives. The Roads and Traffic Authority advised that safety screens which help prevent objects being dropped onto traffic below, will be required for the bridge and various arrangements of these are suggested. The high voltage cables will need to be protected, at present their protection is insufficient for areas subject to public access. Godden Mackay Logan have provided heritage advice which has guided recommendations.

Much of the original 1879 fabric exists including the c. 1900 cast-iron columns which changed the structure from a single-span to a triple-span bridge.

=== Modifications and dates ===
- c. 1900: The span was reduced so as to be able to carry heavier rail traffic by inserting cast-iron columns on the kerb lines of Ultimo Road.
- c. 1996: The line was closed to regular traffic
- 2005: steel cover plates put over remaining track and running surface when it was closed to all traffic.

== Heritage listing ==
As at 9 November 2010, the Ultimo Road underbridge has state significance as the oldest remaining wrought-iron underbridge and a rare triple-girder, plate-web girder bridge on the NSW Railway system. It is a tangible remaining piece of the earliest goods line structures on the NSW railway system and a longstanding piece of the industrial fabric of the Ultimo area. The 1874 bridge represents the first phase of duplication on the NSW system to accommodate increased traffic and increasing adaptation and development to cope with growing loads of larger trains in the early twentieth century as represented by the addition of cast iron columns in 1900.

Ultimo Road Railway Underbridge was listed on the New South Wales State Heritage Register on 2 April 1999 having satisfied the following criteria.

The place is important in demonstrating the course, or pattern, of cultural or natural history in New South Wales.

The Ultimo Road railway underbridge is historically significant at a state level for its association with the history of the Darling Harbour area for 120 years. It formed an integral part of the oldest line in NSW (opened the same day as the first passenger line) and is a rare example of a triple-girder wrought-iron bridge on the NSW system.

The place has a strong or special association with a person, or group of persons, of importance of cultural or natural history of New South Wales's history.

The Ultimo Road underbridge is associated with the first major upgrade of rail infrastructure in the 1870s and the transition from timber bridges to iron bridges.

The place is important in demonstrating aesthetic characteristics and/or a high degree of creative or technical achievement in New South Wales.

The Ultimo Road underbridge has aesthetic significance as a distinctive landmark feature across Ultimo Road. Its wrought-iron columns are fine examples of nineteenth-century decorative ironwork for an industrial structure.

The place has potential to yield information that will contribute to an understanding of the cultural or natural history of New South Wales.

The bridge is technically unusual and interesting as a wrought-iron, triple-girder, plate-web underbridge. It is the oldest plate-web girder in the New South Wales railway system.

The place possesses uncommon, rare or endangered aspects of the cultural or natural history of New South Wales.

The bridge appears to be the only surviving wrought-iron triple-girder structure on the NSW system.

== See also ==
- Ultimo Tram Depot
- Railway Square road overbridge
