= The Goods Line =

Pathway in Ultimo, Sydney, Australia

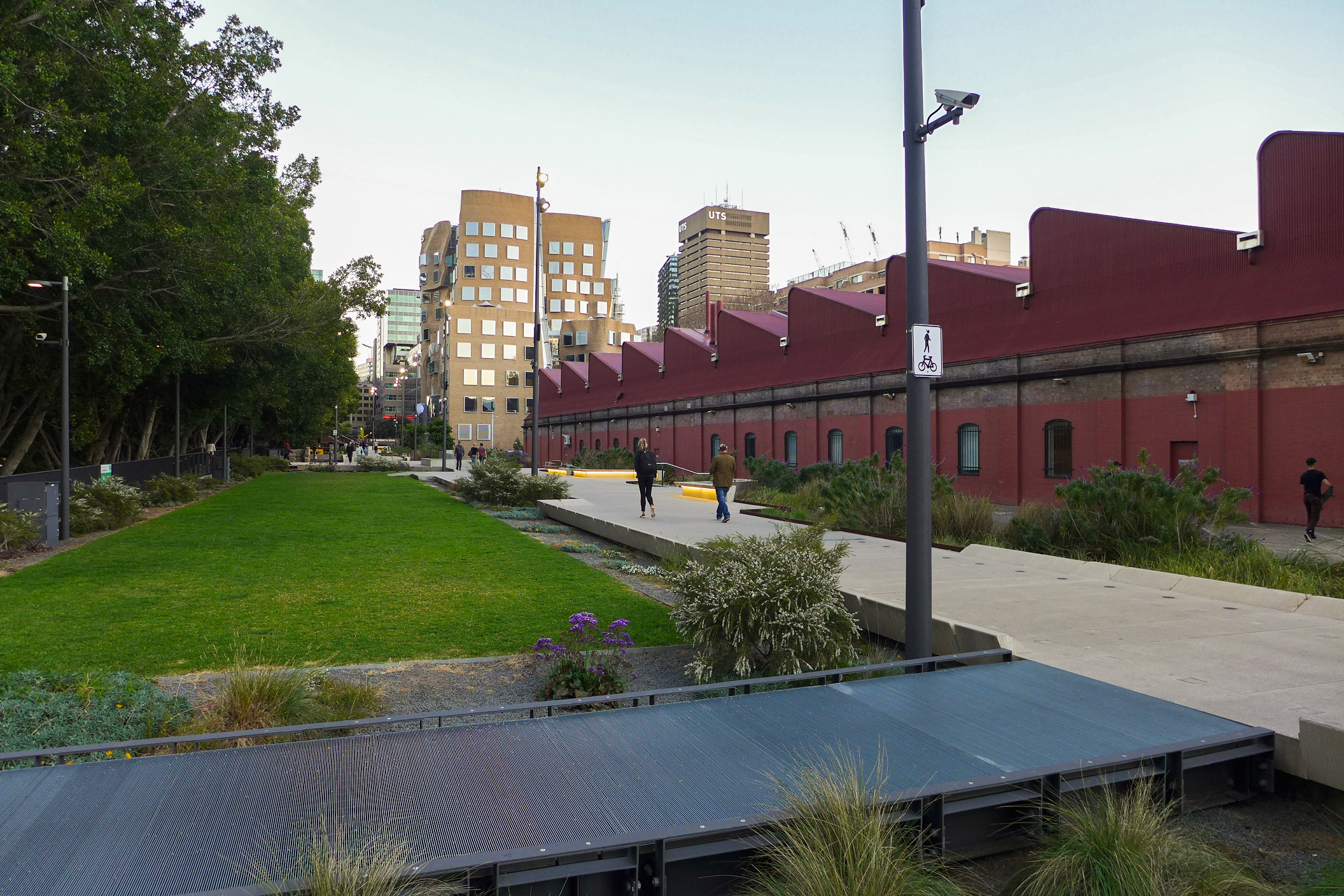
- The Goods Line in August 2017
- Interactive map of The Goods Line
- Type: Urban linear park; public park
- Location: Sydney (Map)
- Coordinates: 33°52′57″S 151°12′09″E
- Area: 800 m (2,625 ft) long
- Created: 2012
- Operator: Property NSW
- Status: Open

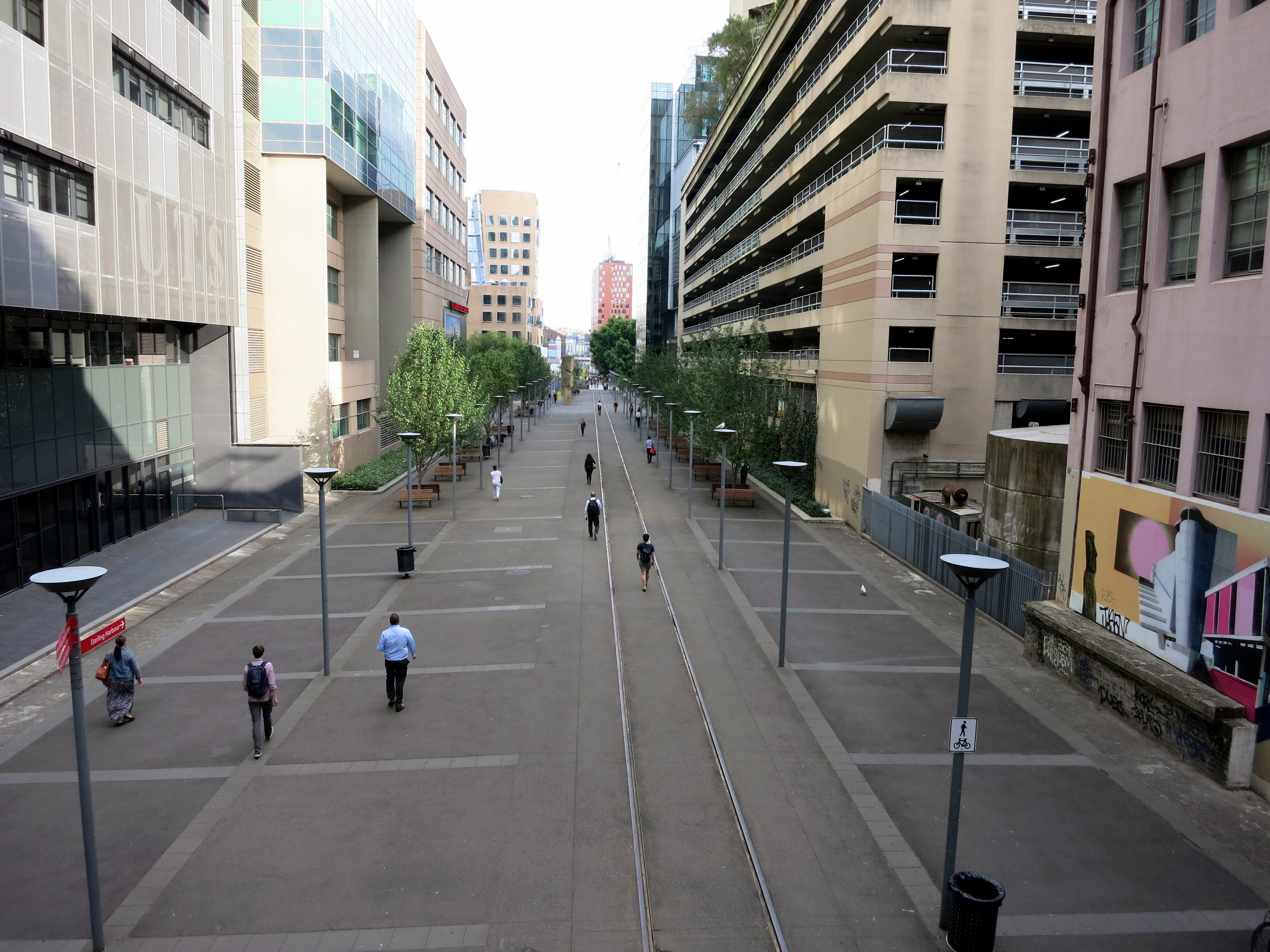
The original section of The Goods Line in November 2016

The Goods Line is an 800 m-long (2,625 ft) linear park and shared pedestrian pathway and cycleway in the suburb of Ultimo, in the City of Sydney, New South Wales, Australia. The corridor connects Railway Square to Darling Harbour in the south and passes both the University of Technology Sydney Broadway campus and the Sydney head office of the Australian Broadcasting Corporation. The Goods Line terminates in the north at the corner of Sussex and Hay Streets, in the Sydney central business district.

== Description ==
From the southern end, the Goods Line walkway commences at the southern end of Central station at the beginning of the Devonshire Street Tunnel. The tunnel is a 300 m-long (984 ft) pedestrian tunnel that was opened in 1906, joining Devonshire Street with Lee Street. From the exit of the tunnel one enters Henry Deane Plaza, which sits slightly below the level of Lee Street and descends a ramp at the other end of the Plaza to enter the extension tunnel beneath Lee Street. The extension tunnel continues under Lee Street, Railway Square and George Street and, at each of these points, the extension tunnel can be exited or entered by stairs and escalators; there are no entry/exit points to the tunnel via any buildings.

The extension tunnel then continues under the TAFE Marcus Clark Building. The Marcus Clark Building was formerly owned by Marcus Clark & Co., a nine-storey department store was constructed in 1913 at 827–837 George Street, Railway Square. Marcus Clark & Co. originally served as a furniture showroom and an extension of the flagship store located at the corner of Pitt and George Streets. This building was remodelled in 1928 to become the company’s main store. The store ceased operations in 1965, and the building was acquired by the Sydney Institute of Technology the following year, in 1966. The extension tunnel opens behind the Wembley House at 841 George Street.

To the west of the end of the extension tunnel, two steel rails appear from under a pair of large gates. The gates block entry to the northern end of the Railway Square road overbridge, which in the past provided access for trains using the railway line to Darling Harbour. From this point, the Goods Line walkway makes use of the former railway's infrastructure, including the Ultimo Road railway underbridge. The walkway exits the rail corridor near the Powerhouse Museum, crosses Darling Drive and terminates at the corner of Sussex and Hay Streets.

== Background ==
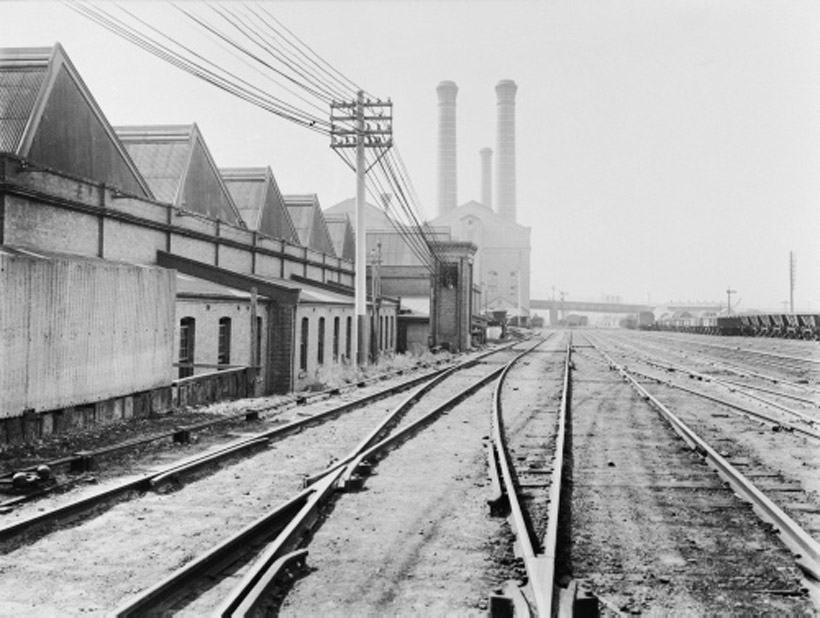
The western edge of Darling Harbour yard. The back of the Ultimo Tram Depot and tramway power station – now the Powerhouse Museum – can be seen. The Goods Line passes by the tram depot and ends at the museum.

The Goods Line runs along the route of a former freight railway line that connected Sydney Yard and the Sydney–Parramatta railway line to the shipping port of Darling Harbour.

=== Historical background ===
The railway line opened in 1855 and was extended to Dulwich Hill in 1922, providing a way for freight trains to access Darling Harbour without interfering with passenger trains. A short branch from Lilyfield to Rozelle served another goods terminal.

=== Transition and decline of freight use (1980s) ===
The port facilities at Darling Harbour closed down and the precinct was extensively redeveloped in the 1980s. In the following years, the Lilyfield – Sydney Yard section became disused and with the Inner West Light Rail that opened between Pyrmont and Central station in 1997 using part of its alignment. The light rail leaves the former railway corridor at Hay Street, leaving a short section of the corridor disused.

=== Redevelopment into The Goods Line (2012) ===
The section of the former goods line corridor from the northern end of the Devonshire Street Tunnel to Ultimo Road was converted into a pedestrian pathway and was originally called the Ultimo Pedestrian Network until it was renamed The Goods Line in 2012. Plans were then announced to expand the pathway through to Hay Street; this second section opened on 30 August 2015. The adjacent Dr Chau Chak Wing Building opened earlier in 2015; an entrance to the building is provided from The Goods Line.

== Design ==
The Goods Line was designed by ASPECT Studios and CHROFI. Design features include grassy lawns, dining tables, table tennis tables, study pods and a children's water play area with a sand pit. The design choices also took cues from the railways, and the designers suggested that instead of transporting materials and produce, the corridor now transports commodities of the modern economy: ideas, people, social and cultural interactions. Several rail artefacts have been preserved, including the Ultimo Road railway underbridge, built in 1879, and a lever frame from the Ultimo Street Signal Box. The design won a 2014 Australia Award for Urban Design in the Policies, Programs and Concepts – Small Scale category.

== Future ==
The original section, from Railway Square to Ultimo Road, will be upgraded. Transport for NSW is conducting a feasibility study on an extension towards the disused Regent Street railway station using the rail tunnel under Railway Square.

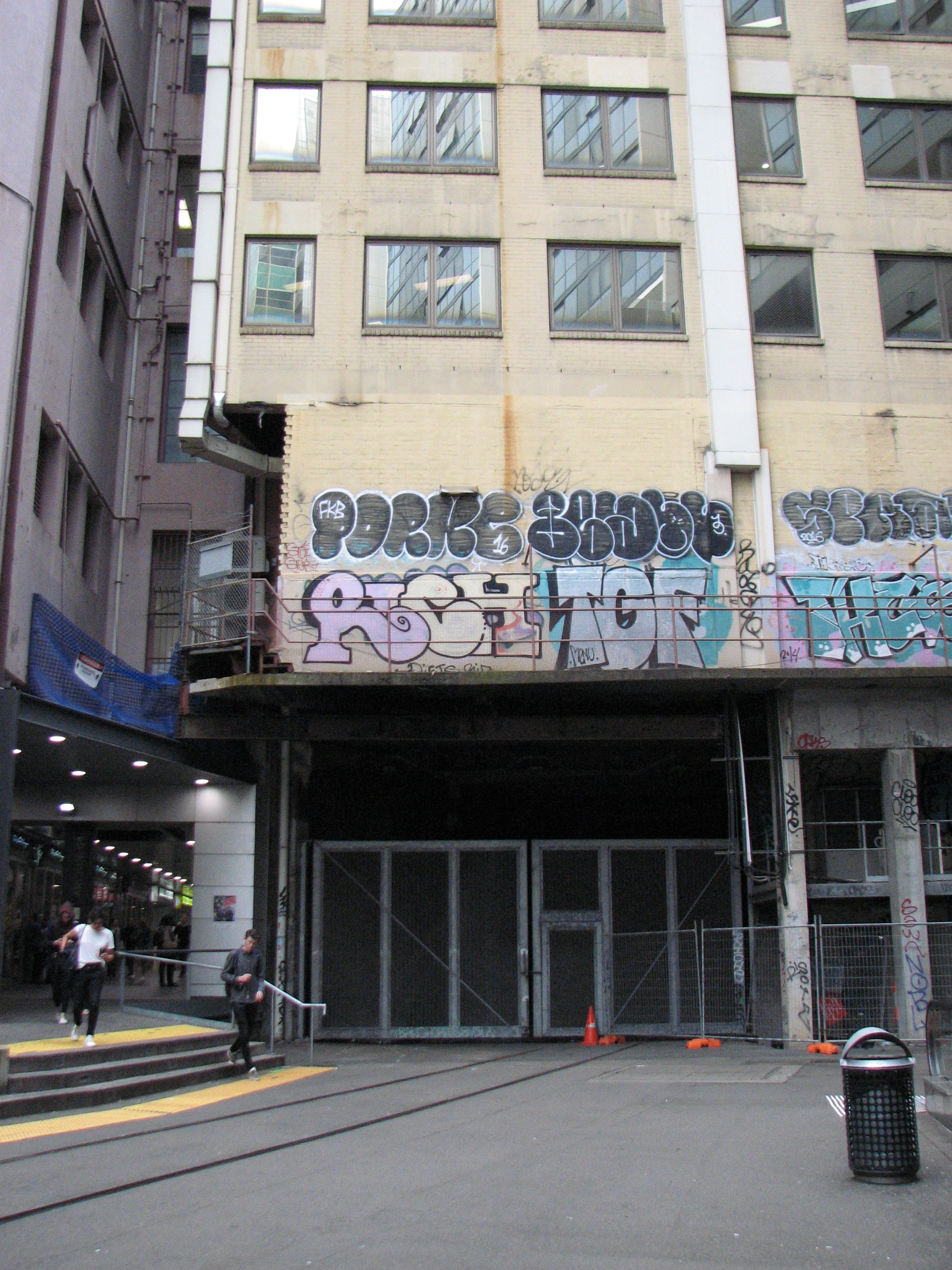
North-western exit of the underbridge, with the pedestrian walkway to the left.

== See also ==
- Map of the Central Station precinct
