= Railway Square =

Public space and transport interchange

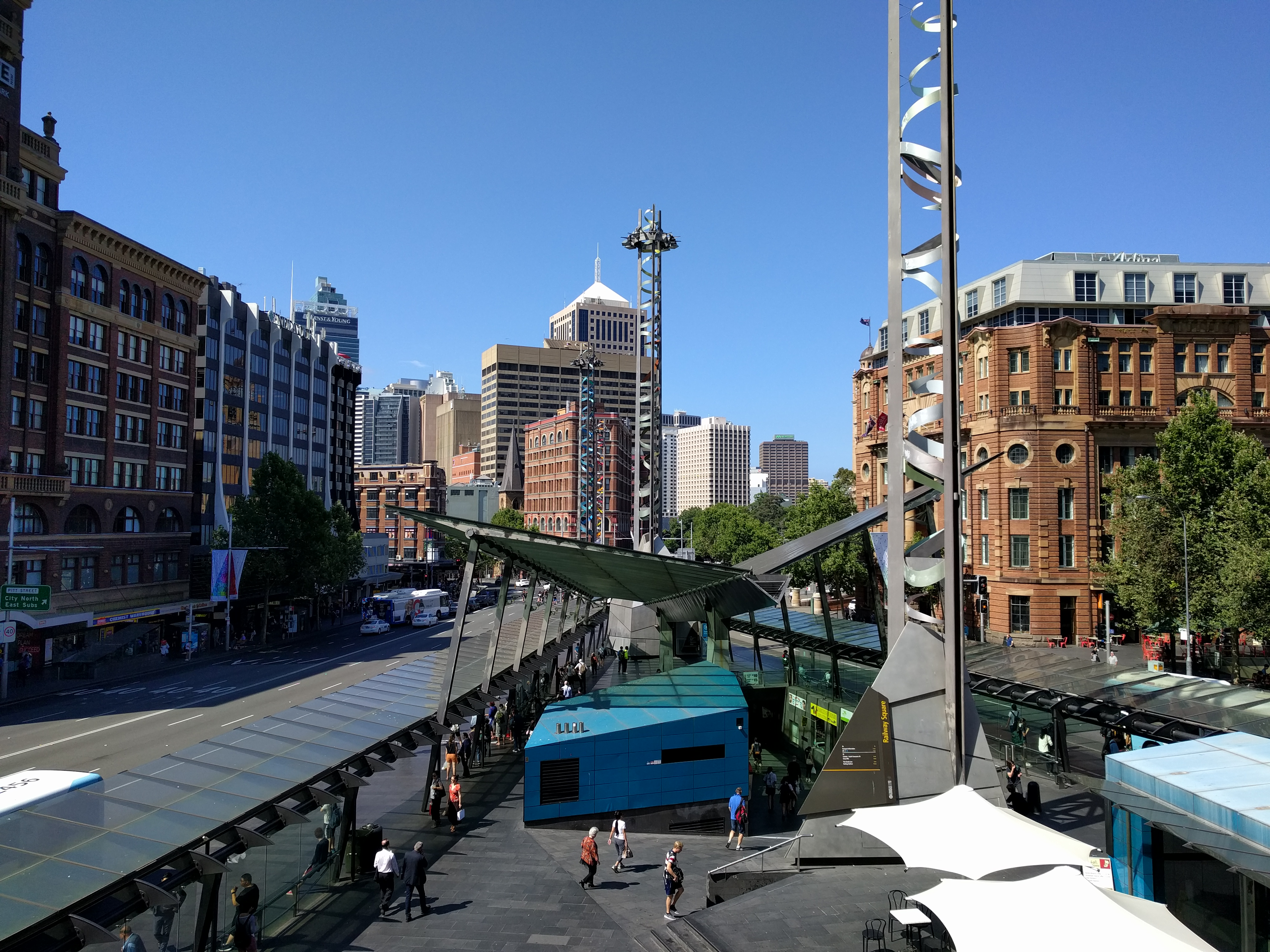
- Railway Square
- Interactive map of Railway Square
- Coordinates: 33.8829°S 151.2042°E
- Country: Australia
- State: New South Wales
- City: Sydney
- LGA: City of Sydney

Area
  - Total: 0.014 km^{2} (0.0054 sq mi)
Localities around Railway Square
Sydney CBD	Sydney CBD	Sydney CBD
Haymarket	Railway Square	Surry Hills
Ultimo	Broadway	Chippendale

Railway Square is a public space and locality at the southern end of the Sydney central business district, New South Wales, Australia, formed by the confluence of George Street, Lee Street, Quay Street and Pitt Street. The square is named for its proximity to the railway at Central Station, Sydney's and Australia's largest and busiest station. The square itself is a very busy intersection for vehicles and pedestrians and the site of a major Sydney bus interchange managed by Transport for NSW. The University of Technology, Chinatown, Haymarket and Central Park, Sydney are all in close proximity to Railway Square.

== History ==
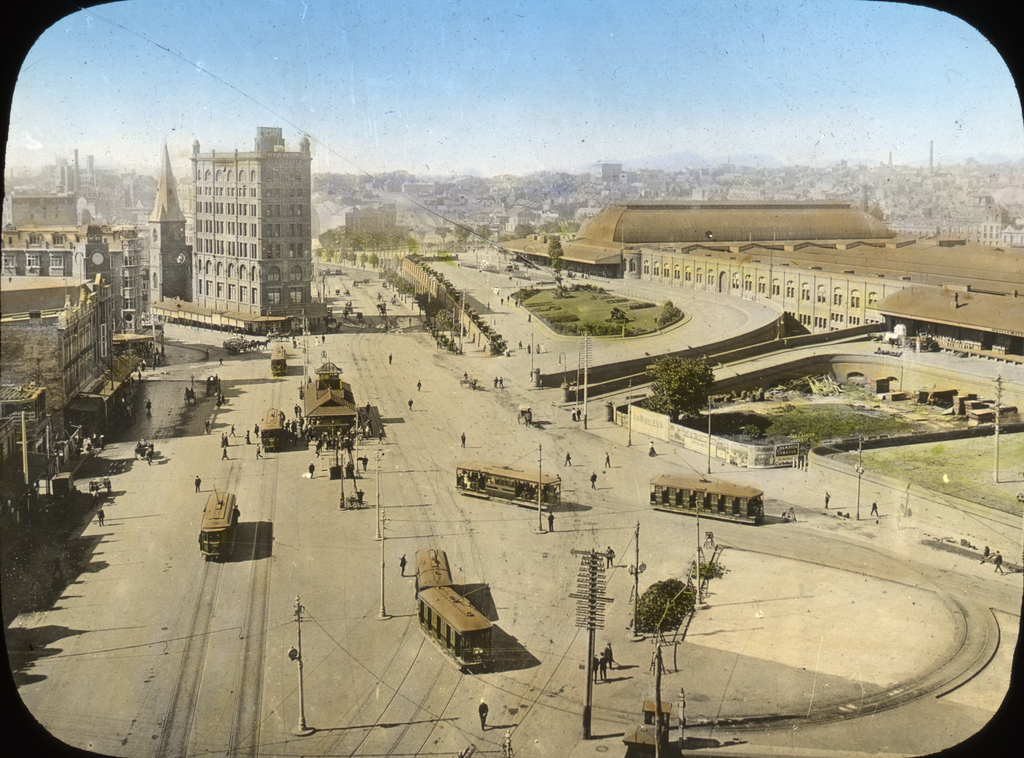
Railway Square in 1910

Railway Square was originally known as Central Square. In the 19th century and early 20th century, Central Square was the heart of the city's modern retail district, enhanced by the presence of Central railway station and its adjacent hotels, erected to serve country visitors arriving in Sydney by train. The Marcus Clark department stores were located in a number of buildings at Central Square. The Parcel Post Office in Lee Street was built in 1913, having been designed by George McRae, the government architect. It was later restored and converted to the Medina Hotel.

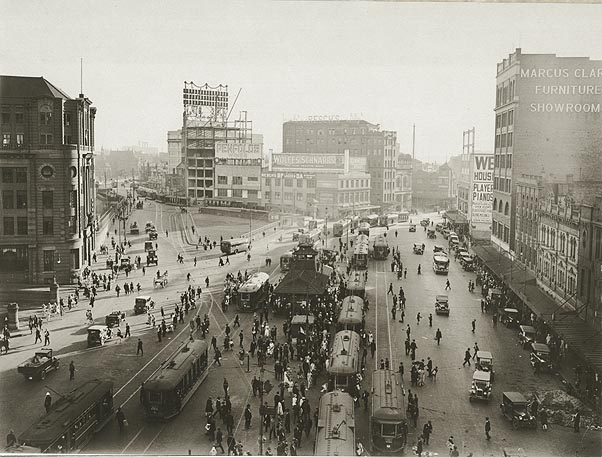
Railway Square tram interchange in 1927

The area was previously a busy nexus for the electric tramways of Sydney until the system's closure in the late 1950s. Until the 1990s, Railway Square had a three-platform bus terminal in its centre. The platforms were connected to one another, as well as the opposite sides of Lee Street and Broadway, by an extension of the Devonshire Street Tunnel.

The 1907 built tramway shelter was removed in June 1973 and re-erected at the Sydney Tramway Museum in Loftus.

On 14 August 1975, a new pedestrian subway and bus station opened with two platforms in the square, one for Public Transport Commission buses to the Eastern Suburbs and one for Inner West services.

On 22 May 1999, a redeveloped bus station with two platforms, lifts, a cafe and access to the University of Technology opened. The site was fitted with public artwork created by Merilyn Fairskye, including murals, illuminated wall panels and four towers with coloured steel ribbons inside, representing the four elements (Air, Water, Earth and Fire). Railway Square is defined by the rising glass and steel bus terminal structures, and by four sculptural light towers. The area is now an interchange for Busways and Transit Systems bus routes.

== Rail tunnel ==
Railway Square is not only traversed underneath by the extension of the Devonshire Street pedestrian tunnel, but also by a railway tunnel that runs underneath at the southern end of the square. The tunnel was part of the Metropolitan Goods line linking the main lines south from Central with Darling Harbour. This tunnel is the oldest railway tunnel in New South Wales and is now disused. The section of the rail line between the tunnel and the Powerhouse Museum is now a park and pedestrian pathway called The Goods Line. The section beyond the Powerhouse Museum has been converted to light rail.
