= Railway Square road overbridge =

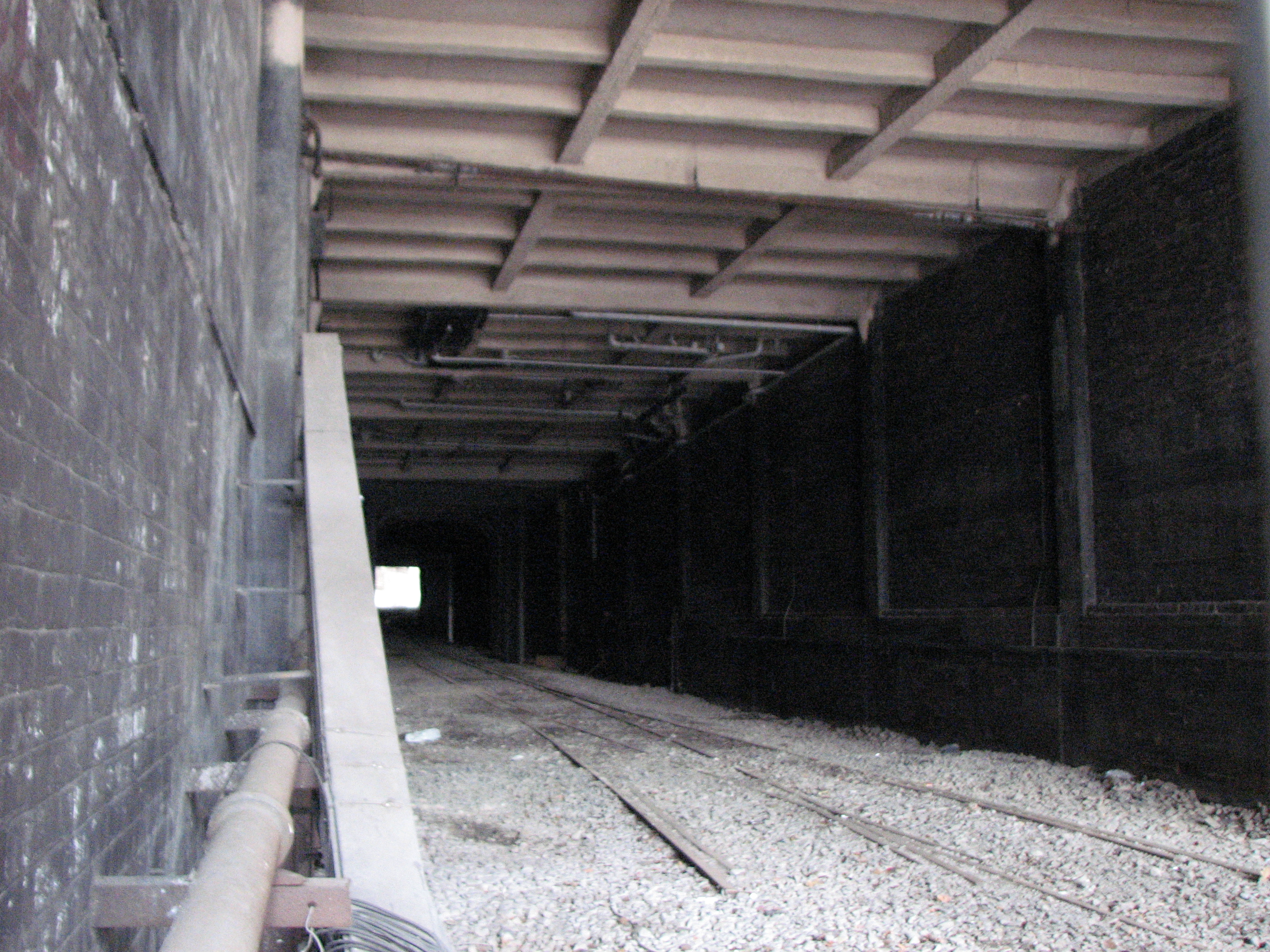
- The overbridge under George, Lee and Regent Streets, and Railway Square
- Coordinates: 33°53′02″S 151°12′12″E
- Carries: George, Lee and Regent Streets (from 1855); The Goods Line (pedestrians, since 2012)
- Crosses: Rozelle–Darling Harbour Goods Line
- Locale: Railway Square, Sydney central business district, New South Wales, Australia
- Begins: Central station (east)
- Ends: George Street (north-western side)
- Owner: Transport Asset Manager of New South Wales

Characteristics
- Design: Arched overbridge
- Material: Sydney sandstone, brick, concrete
- Width: 18.3 metres (60 ft) (1855); c. 62 metres (203 ft) (1880)

Rail characteristics
- No. of tracks: Two
- Track gauge: 4 ft 8 1/2 in (1,435 mm) standard gauge
- Electrified: 1956

History
- Constructed by: Sydney Railway Company
- Opened: 1855

New South Wales Heritage Register
- Official name: Railway Square road overbridge
- Type: State heritage (built)
- Designated: 2 April 1999
- Reference no.: 1232
- Type: Railway Bridge/Viaduct
- Category: Transport – Rail

Location
- Interactive map of Railway Square road overbridge

The Railway Square road overbridge is a heritage-listed road overbridge carrying George Street over the former Rozelle–Darling Harbour Goods Line at Railway Square in the Sydney central business district, Australia.

== History ==
=== Beginnings of rail in New South Wales (1855) ===
On 26 September 1855, the day of the opening of the first passenger rail line between Sydney and Parramatta, the direct goods line from the Sydney Yard to the Darling Harbour wharves and goods yard was also opened. As part of this line the tracks ran under Parramatta Road through a sandstone arched overbridge designed by the engineer William Randle. The day marked the beginning of the railway in colonial New South Wales, and represented its two main functions: transporting people and transporting goods. The interaction of the railway and the shipping at Darling Harbour was an important factor in expanding the available markets for agricultural and manufactured goods for both import and export trade. It allowed for goods to be brought from ever-further parts of NSW as the rail network expanded. These goods could then be loaded directly onto ships for intrastate, interstate and international markets.

In, 1854 the private company was taken over by the government, due largely to a lack of funds and increasing political pressure to complete the first sections as promised.

The original sections of the overbridge at Railway Square are the oldest remaining pieces of railway infrastructure on the NSW system and the last large-scale (possibly only) pieces of infrastructure built by the Sydney Railway Company. The overbridge also remains as one of few tangible reminders of the original Sydney Station complex.

=== Changes and adaptations (1940s–1990s) ===
Aerial photographs from 1943 show that the goods line tunnel (it was becoming a tunnel as overbridges were added and extended) was open for a section in Railway Square between Lee Street and George Street South. This is still apparent on City of Sydney plans from 1955, but it has not been established when it was finally closed over (c. 1970s). The double lines through the tunnel were gauntleted to deal with the lack of clearance when they were electrified in 1956.

The most recent sections of the tunnel are concrete and were constructed c. 1990s when the new Department of Immigration office tower was built in Lee Street.

=== Closure, repurposing and legacy (1986–2012) ===
In 1986, the Darling Harbour goods yard was closed and Darling Harbour was rebuilt as an entertainment and conference facility. The line remained open to allow trains to run through to the Rozelle Yard which itself was closed in 1997. Part of the line from the Sydney Yard was kept open to allow heritage trains access through to the Powerhouse Museum, but this was also closed in c. 2005, bringing to an end 150 years of railway use of the Railway Square overbridge and tunnel. Parts of the tunnel extensions (the brick-vaulted sections) have since been propped using steel frames and braces to support the increasing weight of the road traffic above.

Subsequently, a pedestrian pathway was created, using a section of the railway track, from where the track exited the tunnel of the overbridge, at the north-western end. In 2012 this pathway was named The Goods Line.

== Description ==
The arched overbridge was constructed using Sydney sandstone and was built with a 7.55-metre (24.8 ft) span and a width of 18.3 metres (60 ft). The centre arch was 5 metres (16 ft) above the rail level and has a radius of 4.9 metres (16 ft). It was constructed by the Sydney Railway Company, the private interest group that formed in 1848 with the backing of the New South Wales Legislative Council. William Randle, who had arrived in 1852 with the company's new Engineer-in-Chief, James Wallace, was placed in charge of construction.

The first section of the Railway Square overbridge completed was an arched sandstone overbridge, which remains in the centre of the current tunnel. To the east and west the first extensions included sandstone walls with a brick vaulted ceiling. Later extensions to the east and west were completed in brick and concrete. The approach from the southeast is via a brick-lined cutting which dates from pre-1885. The two brick vaulted sections are propped with steel bracing frames. The first section was completed in 1855, the west extension c. 1880, the southeast extension c. 1990s, and steel bracing added to support the original stone section c. 2005.

During the 1880s Parramatta Road was widened and so the overbridge was also widened to the west by approximately 44 metres (144 ft). In c. 1909 George Street South was extended to join Regent Street. The new section was named Lee Street and necessitated the extension of the overbridge to the east. Both these extensions were constructed using sandstone for the walls and vaulted arched brickwork.

The tunnel and original overbridge are in good to moderate condition. There is evidence of damp and some cracking of masonry. Mortar is missing from the portions of the original sandstone section. The roofs of the two immediately adjacent sections, being the brick vaulted extensions, are braced with steel framing.

== Significance ==
The Ultimo (Railway Square) overbridge is of state significance as the oldest surviving structure on the NSW railway system and possibly the only surviving example of the work of the Sydney Railway Company. Opened in 1855, it has a direct and tangible link to the first phase of railway construction in NSW and to the Darling Harbour Goods Yard. The overbridge is associated with William Randle, the first engineer in charge of construction on the NSW railways. The various extensions to the overbridge which together form the current tunnel demonstrate the changing technologies and designs used in railway engineering. The sandstone ceilings blackened from the soot and steam of the steam trains that used it are an evocative reminder of the steam era. The overbridge has a strong connection to the original Sydney Station and is a rare example of the first phase of railway construction in NSW.

== Heritage listing ==
Railway Square road overbridge was listed on the New South Wales State Heritage Register on 2 April 1999.

== Gauntlet track ==
Insufficient clearances for overhead wires of 1500V DC electrification in the 1950s required the double track under this bridge to be singled as gauntlet track. This required no turnouts.

== Gallery ==
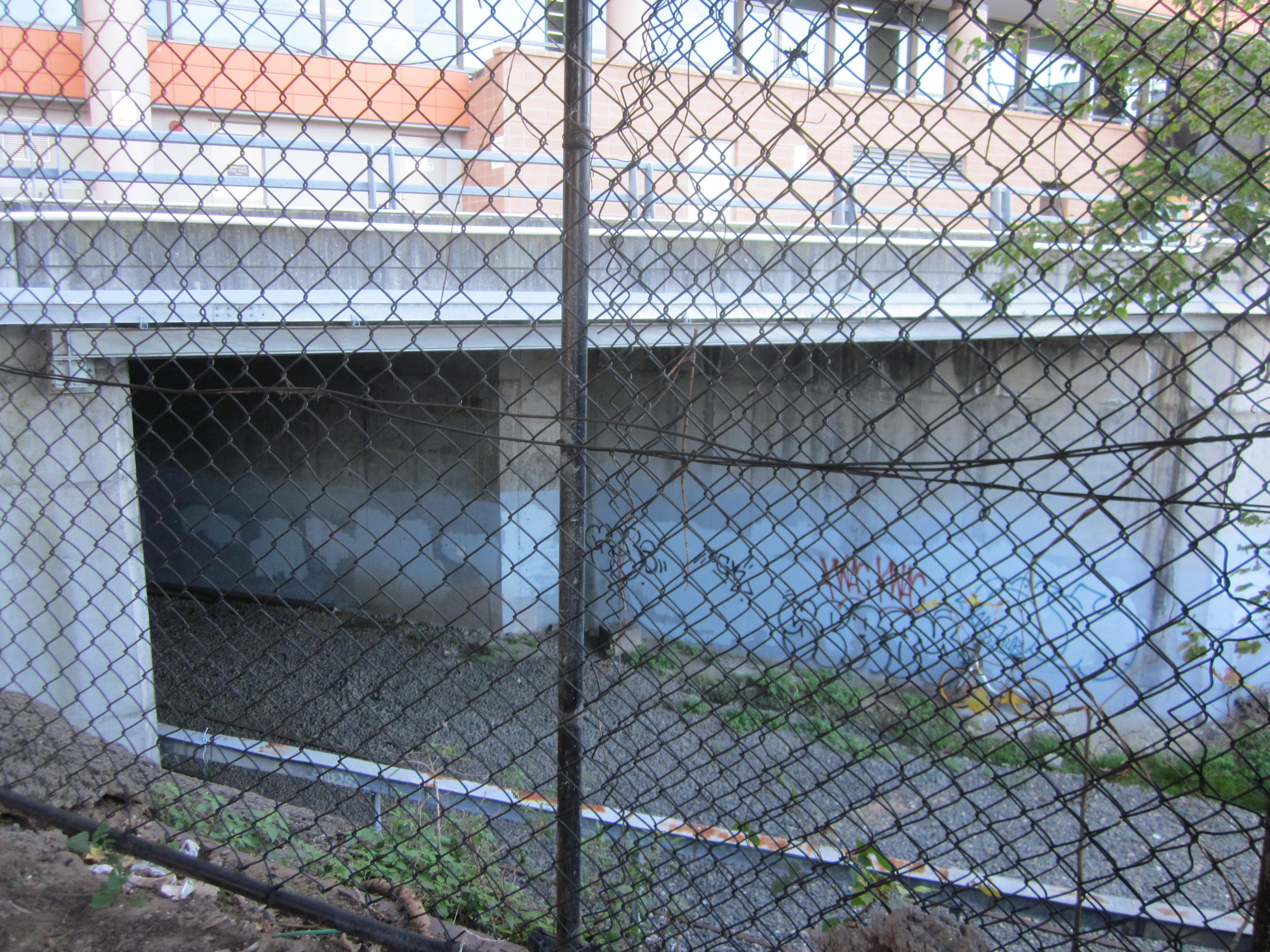
The south eastern entrance to the overbridge, under the building at 26 Lee Street.

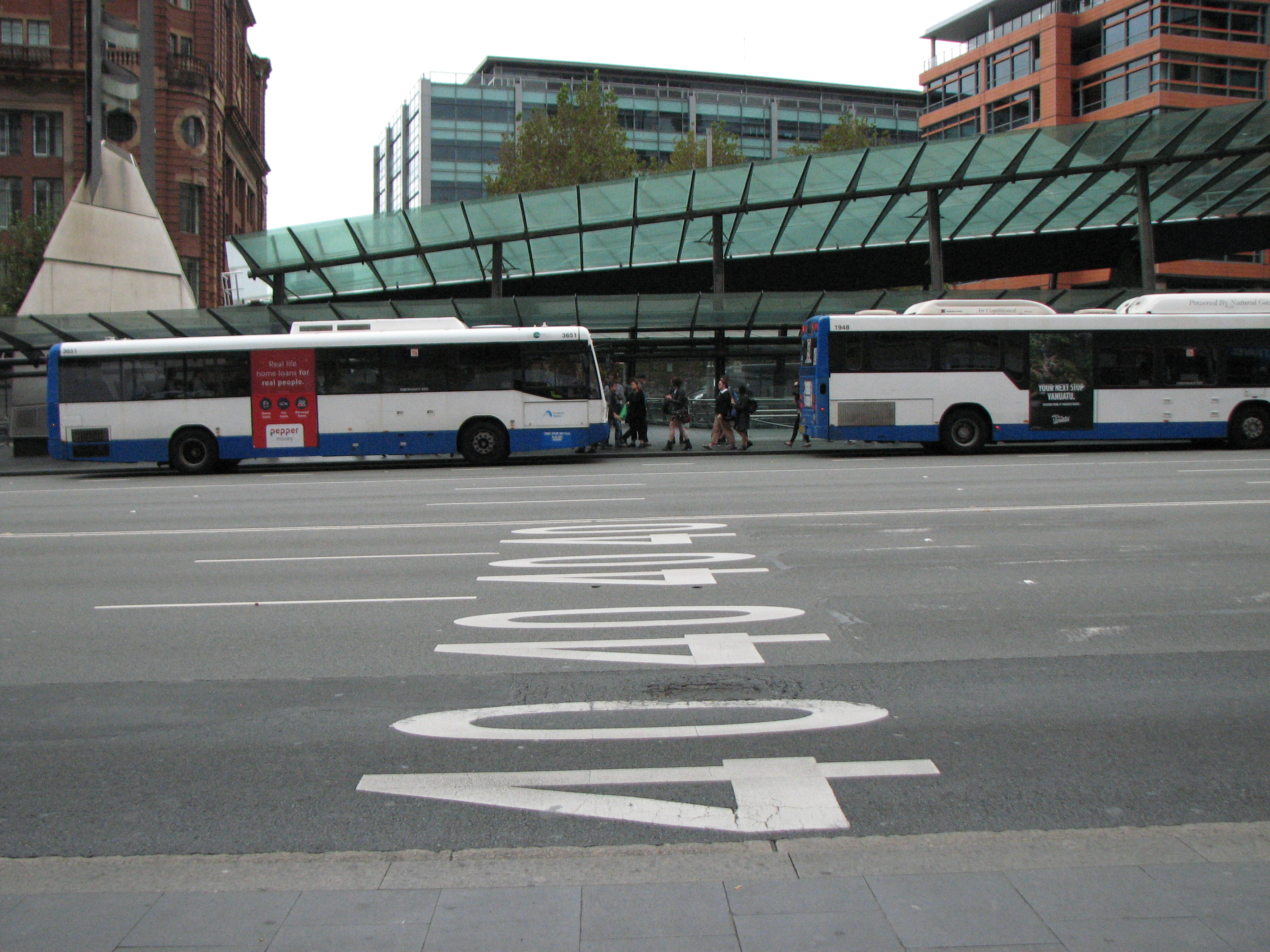
Looking from west to south-east, across George Street, with the overbridge below.

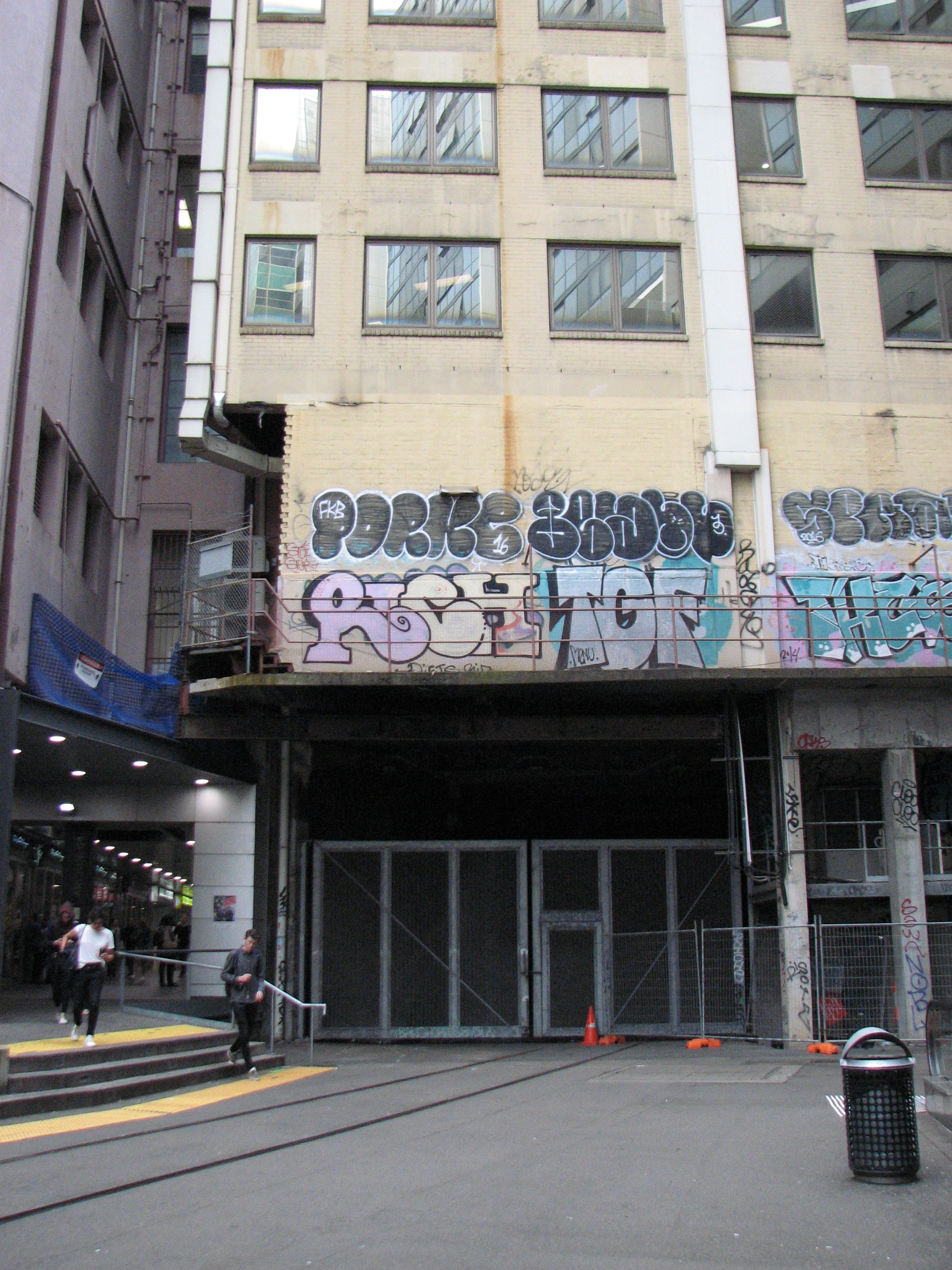
North-western exit of the underbridge, with the pedestrian walkway to the left.
