= Light rail in Sydney =

Australian modern light rail system

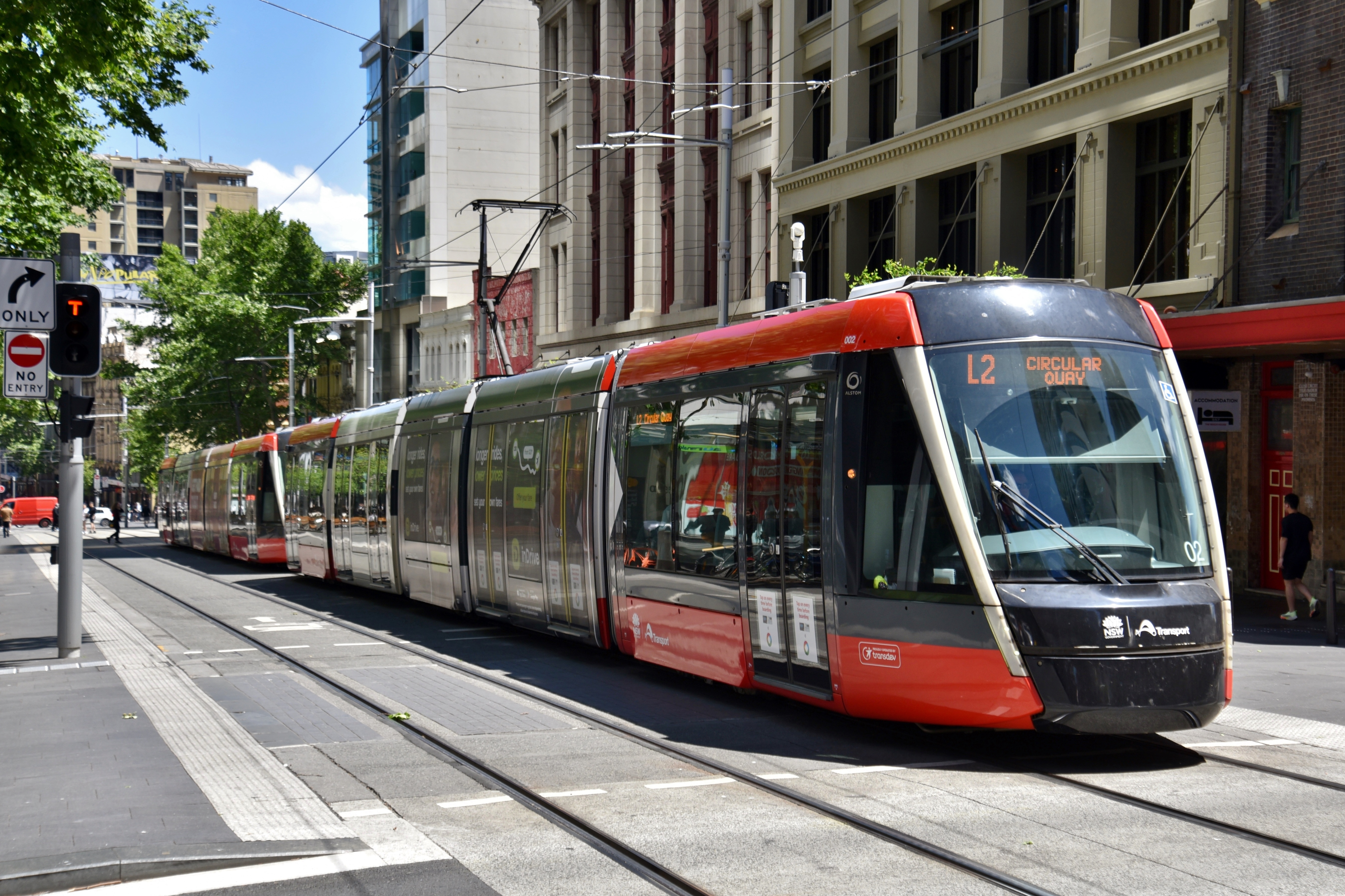
- An Alstom Citadis 305 on George Street

- Roundel

Overview
- Owner: Transport for NSW
- Locale: Sydney, New South Wales
- Transit type: Light rail
- Number of lines: 4
- Number of stops: 58
- Annual ridership: 47.7 million (2025/26)
- Website: TfNSW Light Rail

Operation
- Began operation: 31 August 1997; 29 years ago
- Operators: Transdev Sydney; Great River City Light Rail
- Number of vehicles: 60 Alstom Citadis 305; 17 Urbos 100; 12 CAF Urbos 3

Technical
- System length: 48.8 km (30 mi)
- Track gauge: 1,435 mm (4 ft 8 1/2 in) standard gauge
- Electrification: 750 V DC from overhead catenary APS power supply between Town Hall and Circular Quay; CAF ACR at Westmead
- Top speed: 70 km/h (43 mph)

The Sydney light rail network is a light rail system serving the city of Sydney, New South Wales, Australia. There are four passenger routes across two physically separate parts of the network: the inner-city Sydney Light Rail L1 Dulwich Hill, L2 Randwick, and L3 Kingsford Lines, and the Parramatta Light Rail L4 Westmead & Carlingford Line. The total network comprises 58 stops and a length of approximately 48.8 km (30.3 mi), making it the second largest light rail network in Australia behind the tram system in Melbourne, Victoria.

The network is managed by Transport for NSW, with day-to-day operations contracted to Transdev. In the 2025–26 financial year, 47.7 million passenger journeys were made on the network, equating to over 110,000 journeys per day.

== History ==
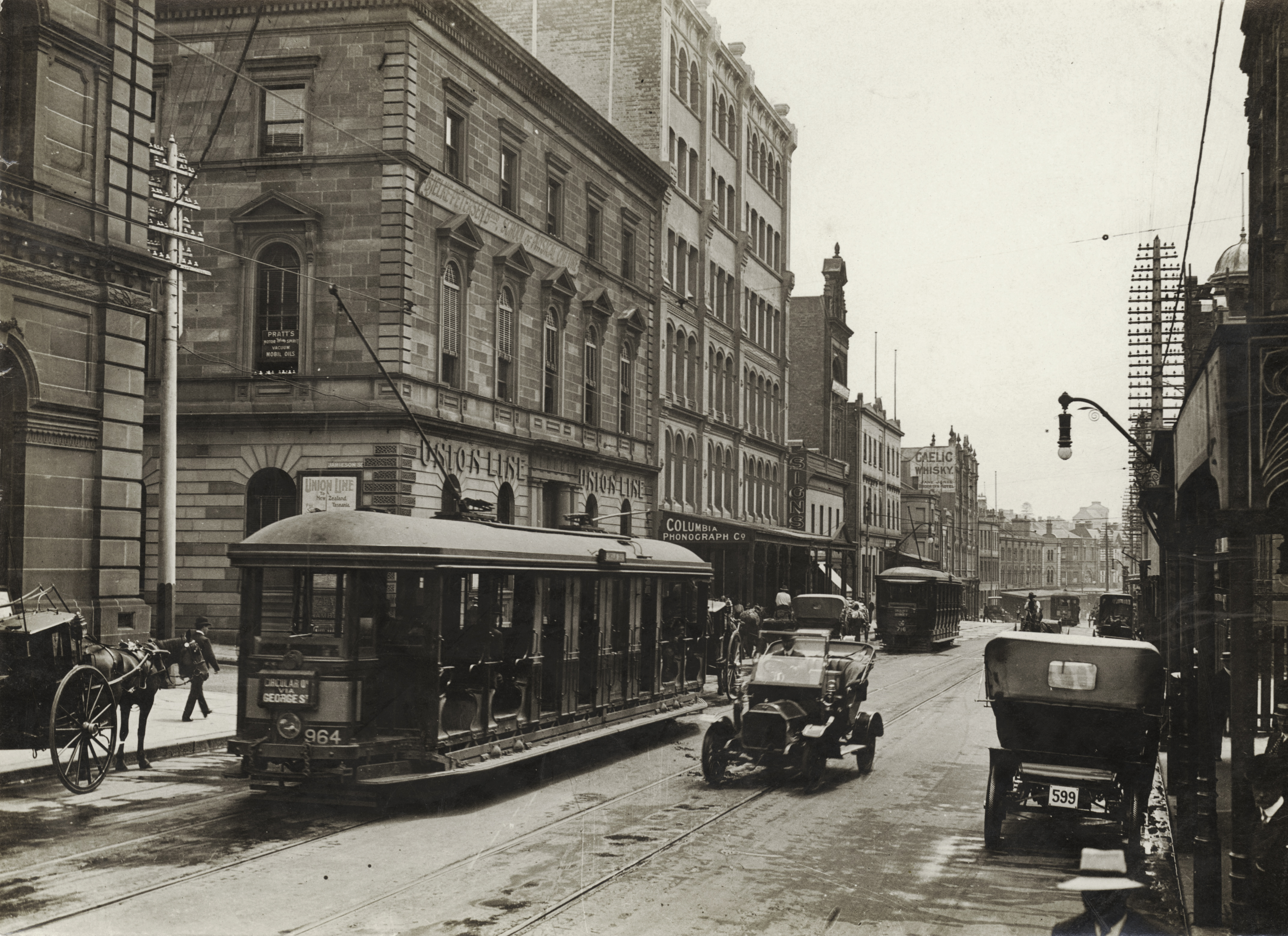
Trams on George Street in 1920

In the 19th and 20th centuries, Sydney developed an extensive tram network, which grew to be the second largest in the Southern Hemisphere and second largest in the Commonwealth after London. The increasing rate of private car ownership, the perception that trams contributed to traffic congestion and the general rundown conditions of the network due to the lack of funding after World War II led to the progressive replacement of tram services with buses, with the final section of the tram network closing on 25 February 1961.

In the 1980s and 1990s, the inner city areas of Darling Harbour and Pyrmont were the subject of an urban renewal program. In 1988 the Sydney Monorail opened, connecting Darling Harbour to the city centre. With poor integration between the monorail and other transport modes and the increasing redevelopment of the Pyrmont peninsula – including the establishment of Sydney's first legal casino – it was decided to convert a disused section of the Metropolitan Goods railway line into a light rail line. A section of track between Pyrmont and Haymarket was upgraded and a new on-street section was built to link the line to Central station. The line was set up as a public-private partnership. It opened in August 1997, running between Central Station and Wentworth Park, Pyrmont.

In 1991, the Coalition for Urban Transport Planning (CUTS) group organised a rally in 1991 titled The Battle for the Bridge. The CUTS group sought to promote integrated transport and land use planning. (Note: CUTS Minutes, Letters, Articles, Media Releases, Briefing Papers from 1986–1995 are held by the NSW State Library)

The private owner soon made proposals for a western extension continuing along the disused goods line, plus a new line through the city centre from Central to Circular Quay. The western extension opened in 2000, terminating at Lilyfield, but a new line through the city centre was not built in this decade.

By contrast, the 2010s saw significant investment in the light rail system. This included the announcement and delivery of multiple new infrastructure projects, integration of ticketing with the city's other transport modes, the introduction of new trams and the transfer of the network to full public ownership. The boon coincided with a period of investment in urban railways across Sydney and Australia; the state transport minister in 2020 labelled Sydney a "train city" in reference to its various rail modes.

=== Ownership and operation ===
==== Public-private partnership ====
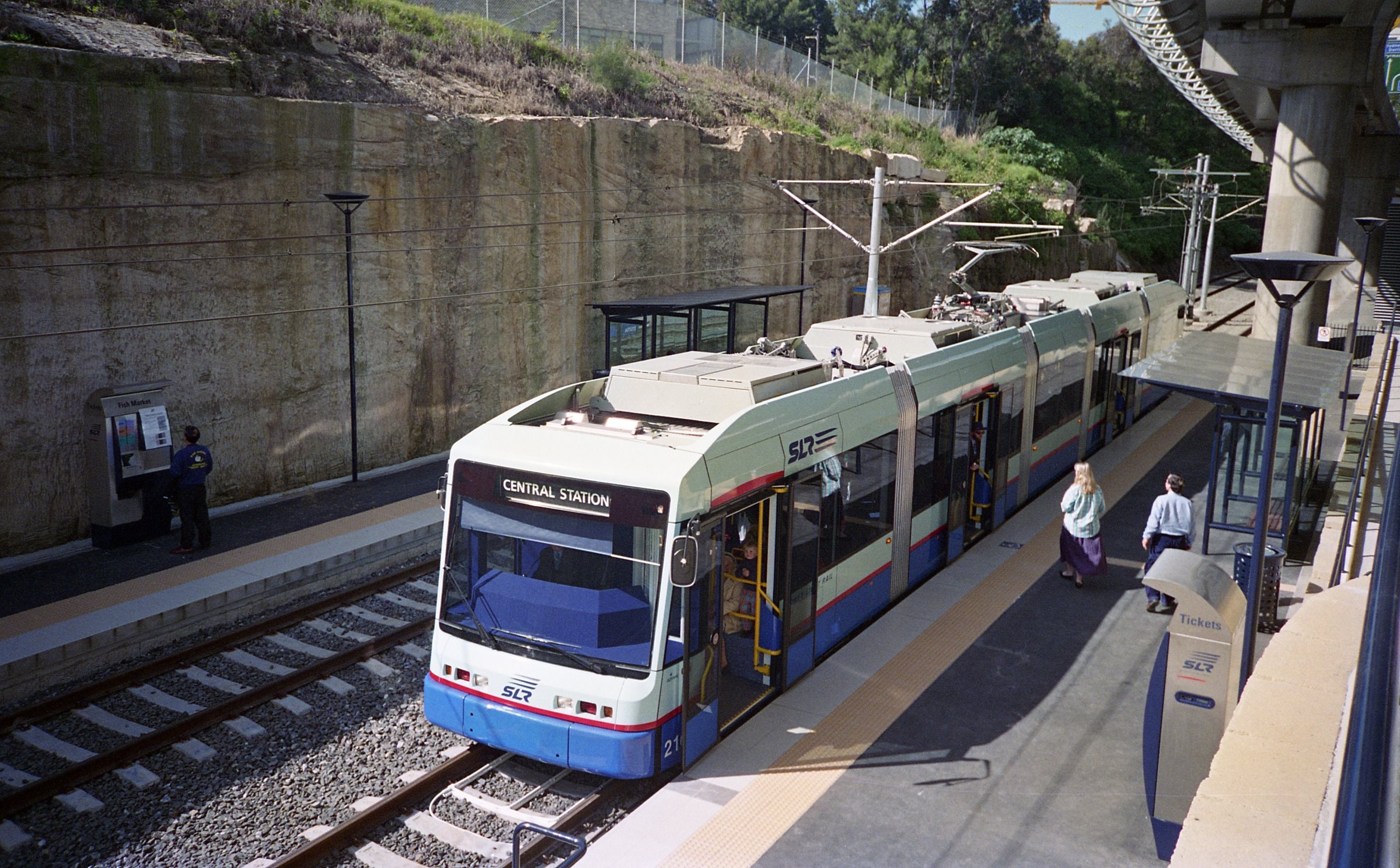
A Sydney Light Rail service in 1997 at Fish Market

In March 1994, the Sydney Light Rail Company (SLRC) was formed. SLRC was awarded a 30-year concession to operate the light rail system until February 2028 when ownership would pass to the New South Wales Government. The contract gave the company significant control over the commercial arrangements relating to future extensions or interconnecting lines. Operation of the line was contracted to TNT Transit Systems, which also owned the Sydney Monorail.

In August 1998, the SLRC purchased TNT Transit Systems as part of a joint venture with CGEA Transport. This resulted in CGEA Transport taking over the light rail operating contract. CGEA Transport and its successors have operated the inner city light rail network ever since.

In early 2001, Connex, renamed from CGEA Transport in 1999, sold its share of the monorail to the SLRC, bringing the monorail and light rail under unified ownership and leading to the formation of Metro Transport Sydney.

In March 2012, the New South Wales Government purchased Metro Transport Sydney, and the company was placed under the control of Transport for NSW. The purchase removed the contractual restrictions on expanding the light rail system and allowed the government to dismantle the monorail, assisting its plans to redevelop the Sydney Convention & Exhibition Centre.

==== Government ownership ====
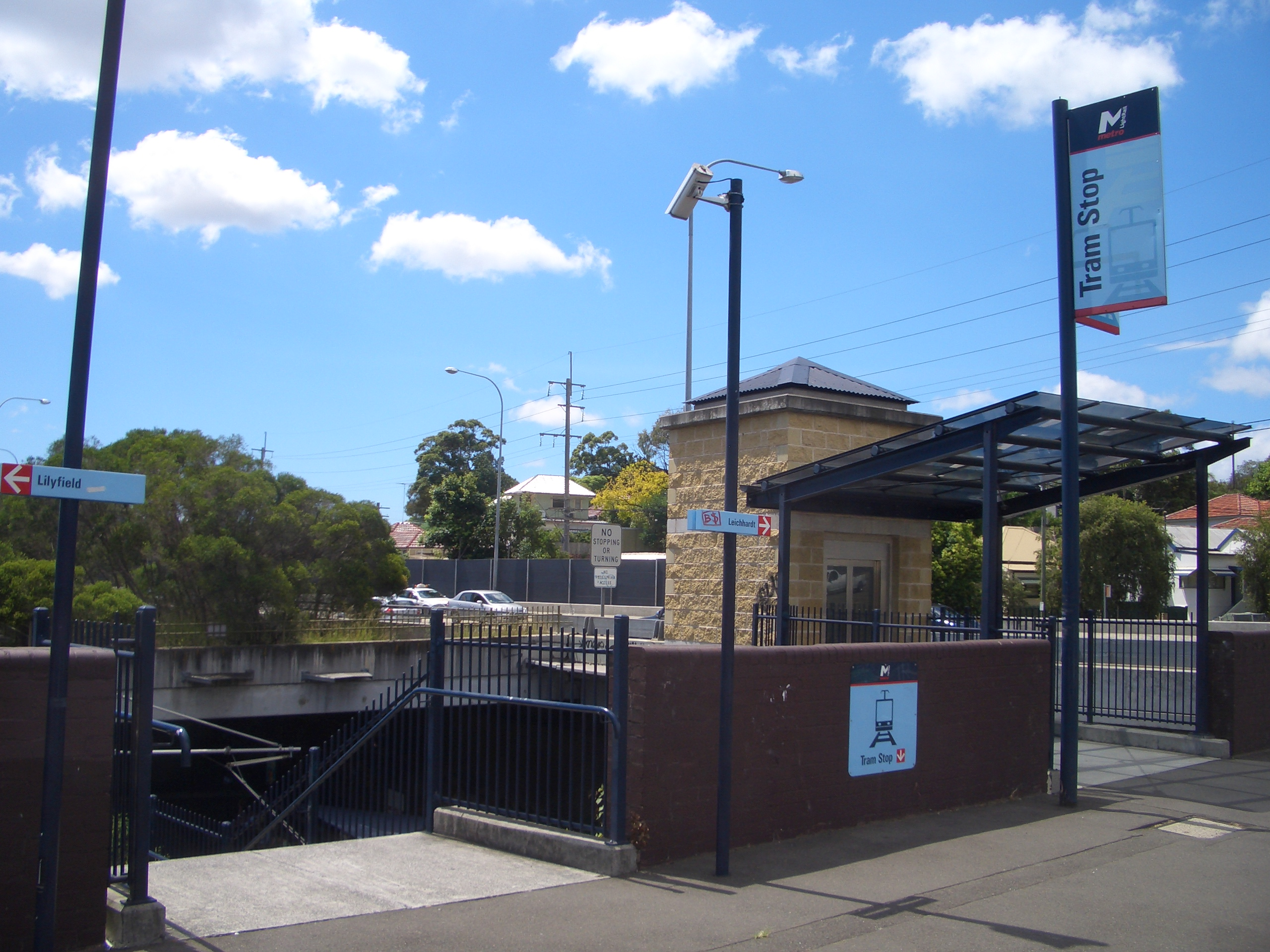
Metro Transport Sydney signage

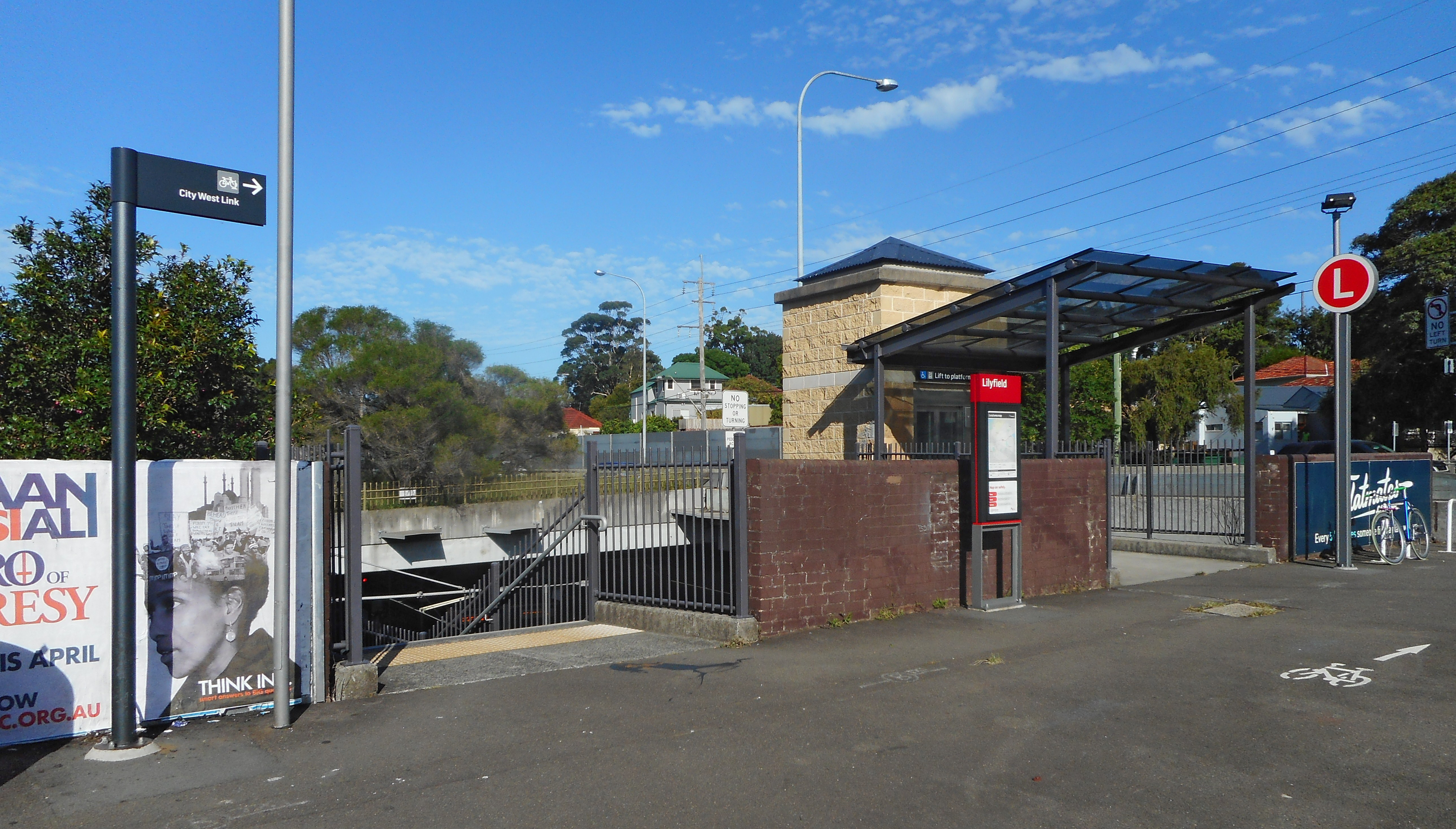
Transport for NSW signage

The entrance to the Lilyfield stop before and after the New South Wales Government takeover.

From July 2013, the Metro Light Rail brand was phased out as part of a broader rebranding and reorganisation of public transport services in New South Wales. In September 2014, the process of shutting down Metro Transport Sydney and transferring assets to Transport for NSW was completed.

The former private owners had set their own fares, which were typically higher than those applied to buses. Light rail fares were originally based on a two-zone geographic zonal fare structure. After the government bought MTS, light rail fares were aligned with bus fares, using a distance-based fare structure, when the Opal card ticketing system was extended to light rail, in December 2014. The extension of Opal to cover light rail also ended the need for on-board paper ticket sales by customer service officers.

Following the announcement of the CBD and South East Light Rail, the government decided to group the contract covering the construction of the new line with the operation and maintenance of both lines of the inner city network. In December 2014, Transport for NSW awarded the contract to the ALTRAC Light Rail consortium. This saw Transdev Sydney, the operator under the previous contract, continue to operate and maintain the network as part of the consortium. The operating contract commenced on 1 July 2015 and runs until 2034.

After taking control of the Inner West Light Rail and announcing the CBD and South East Light Rail, the government moved to establish a separate network centred around the Western Sydney suburb of Parramatta. Transdev was contracted to operate the Parramatta network as part of the Great River City Light Rail consortium. This contract runs for eight years from construction completion, with a possible extension of up to an additional ten years.

In 2026, six trams caught fire within four months. This followed a program that was intended to reduce the occurrence of these issues by installing safer batteries on the trams. The Office of Transport Safety Investigations is undertaking an investigation into these issues.

== Operations ==
=== Lines ===
Sydney's light rail network consists of:

- Inner West Light Rail – serviced by L1 Dulwich Hill Line
- CBD and South East Light Rail – serviced by L2 Randwick Line and L3 Kingsford Line
- Parramatta Light Rail – serviced by L4 Westmead and Carlingford Line

Line		Termini	via	Full length
	Dulwich Hill Line	Central & Dulwich Hill	Haymarket – Pyrmont – Glebe – Lilyfield – Leichhardt – Haberfield – Lewisham	12.8 km (8.0 mi)
CBD and South East Light Rail	Randwick Line	Circular Quay & Randwick	City – Haymarket – Surry Hills – Moore Park – Randwick	12 km (7.5 mi)
CBD and South East Light Rail	Kingsford Line	Circular Quay & Kingsford	City – Haymarket – Surry Hills – Moore Park – Kensington	12 km (7.5 mi)
Parramatta Light Rail	Westmead and Carlingford Line	Westmead & Carlingford	North Parramatta – Parramatta – Rydalmere – Dundas – Telopea	12 km (7.5 mi)

The light rail lines of Sydney: the Inner West Light Rail, CBD and South East Light Rail, and stage 1 of the Parramatta Light Rail

==== L1 Dulwich Hill Line ====
L1 Dulwich Hill Line

The L1 Dulwich Hill Line is the network's original passenger route, which first commenced in August 1997. It operates along the 12.8-kilometre (8 mi) Inner West Light Rail between Central Station and Dulwich Hill, stopping at 23 stops along the route. It connects Sydney's Inner West with the Pyrmont peninsula, Darling Harbour and the southern end of the city centre.

The majority of the Inner West Light Rail line is along the alignment of a former freight railway line, with a short on-street section at the city end. The line opened between Central railway station in the city and Wentworth Park, Pyrmont on 11 August 1997, then extended west to Lilyfield in August 2000, and then southwest to Dulwich Hill in March 2014.

From late October 2021 to February 2022, services were replaced by buses after major cracks were found in all 12 Urbos 3 trams serving the line. Limited service was then restored with borrowed Citadis trams from the CBD and South East Light Rail.

==== L2 Randwick & L3 Kingsford Lines ====
L2 Randwick Line and L3 Kingsford Line

L2 Randwick Line services commenced on 14 December 2019, while L3 Kingsford Line services commenced operations on 3 April 2020. They operate on the CBD and South East Light Rail, between Circular Quay at the northern end of the city centre to Central Station at the southern end, then continuing to the south-eastern suburbs.

CBD and South East Light Rail were built to reduce bus congestion in the CBD and provide higher capacity public transport to the Sydney Football Stadium, Sydney Cricket Ground, Randwick Racecourse and the University of New South Wales, which were previously served only by buses. In contrast to the Inner West Light Rail, the line is mostly on-street and follows a similar path to routes used by the former tramway network. Major construction began in October 2015.

==== L4 Westmead and Carlingford line ====
The Parramatta Light Rail. Route and stops of stage 1 and indicative route of stage 2.

Parramatta Light Rail is the name given to two lines that converge on the Western Sydney centre of Parramatta. These lines will have no connection to the Inner West or CBD and South East lines.

The first line runs from Carlingford to Westmead via the Parramatta CBD. It includes the conversion of most of the former heavy rail Carlingford line to light rail standards. Construction began in 2018 and was opened to the public on 20 December 2024.

The preferred route for the second line was announced in October 2017. This line branches from the first line at Rydalmere and travels through Ermington, Melrose Park, Wentworth Point and on to the Sydney Olympic Park events precinct.

==== Under construction ====
In February 2024, Stage 2 of the Parramatta Light Rail linking Parramatta to Sydney Olympic Park via Rydalmere, Melrose Park and Wentworth Point received planning approval after the New South Wales Government invested $200 million to expedite planning processes for the project in its 2023–24 state budget.

== Rolling stock ==
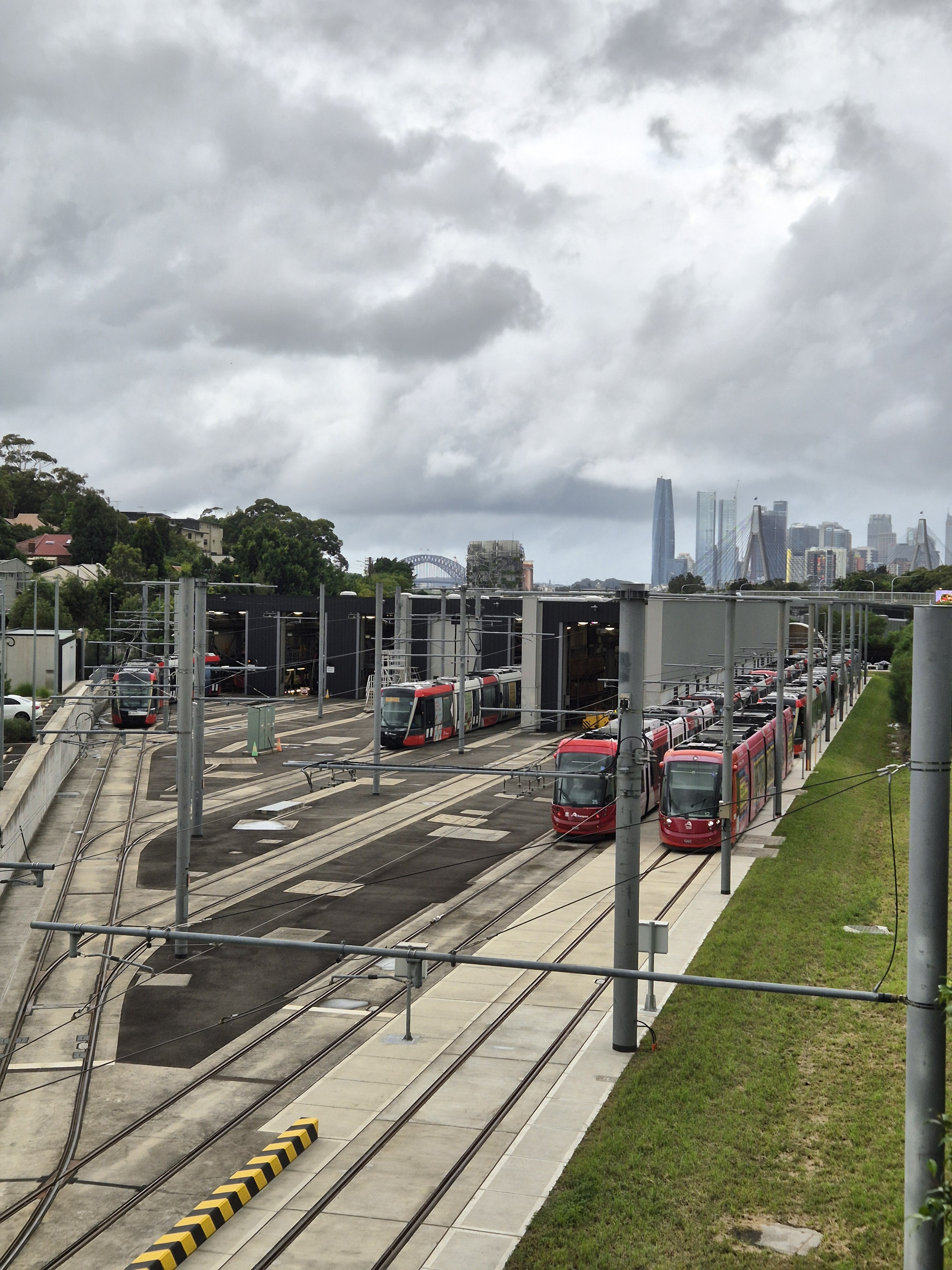
Lilyfield Maintenance Depot, on the site of the former Rozelle Yard.

All services on the Inner West Light Rail were previously operated by a single class of tram. A second class was introduced to operate services on the CBD and South East Light Rail. All vehicles to have operated on the system have been articulated, low floor and bi-directional. The system uses standard gauge track and 750 volt direct current electrification.

Both lines use different specifications on a range of measures including gaps between platforms and carriages, height and width of the actual track, clearances between the track corridor and its surrounds, and distance between the back wheels of the trams. As a result, Urbos 3 trams used on the Inner West Light Rail (L1 Dulwich Hill) line are unable to serve on the CBD and South East Light Rail (L2 Randwick and L3 Kingsford) lines However, Citadis 305 trams used on the CBD and South East Light Rail are able to run on the Inner West Light Rail as the vehicles are narrower. This was to allow the fleet to access the Lilyfield maintenance centre via the Inner West Light Rail. This also allowed for Citadis trams to be used for L1 Dulwich Hill services on the Inner West Light Rail.

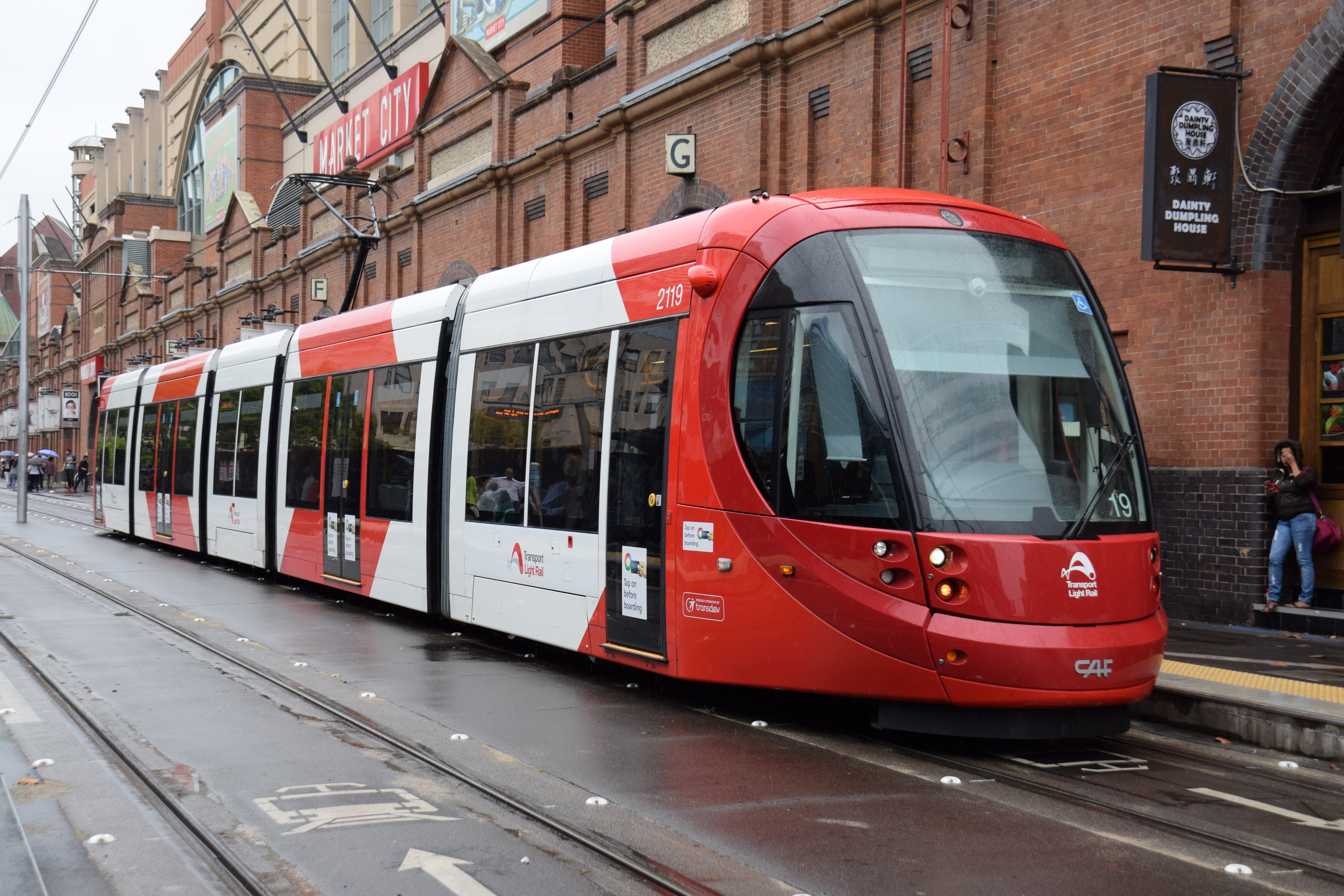
Urbos 3

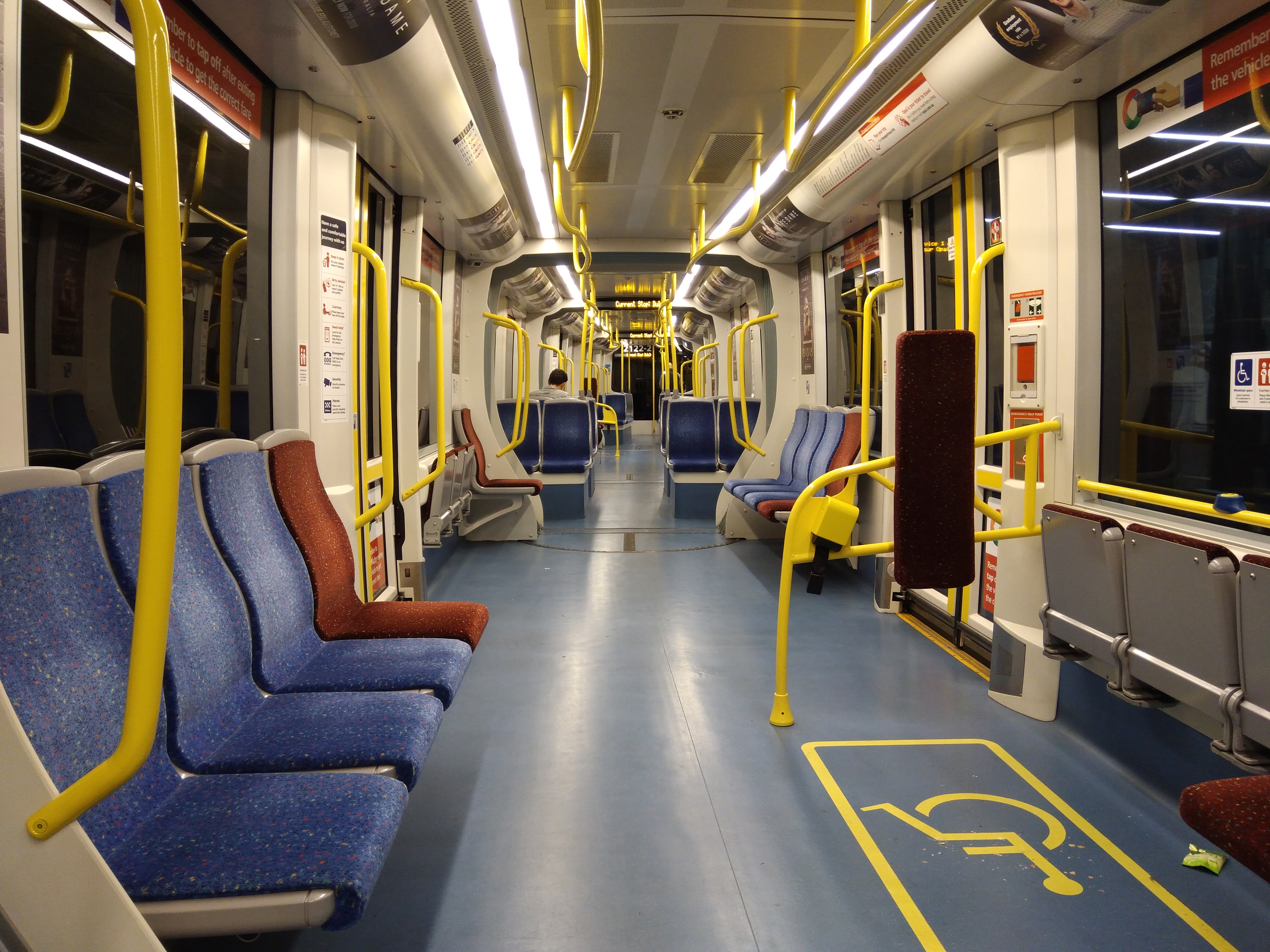
Interior

=== Urbos 3 and Urbos 100 ===
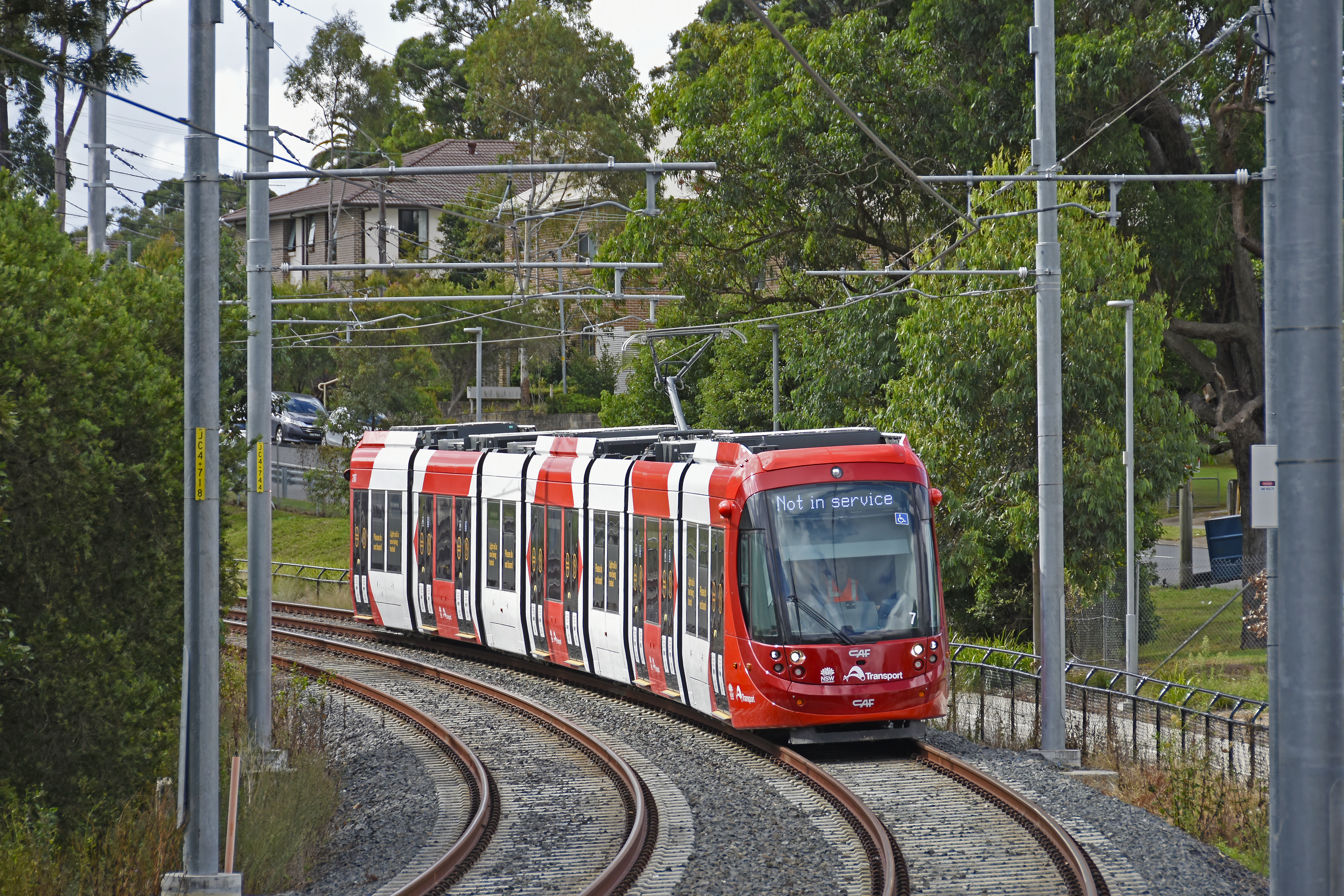
Urbos 100 on the Parramatta Light Rail

==== Inner West Light Rail ====
Following the 5.6 km (3.5 mi) extension of the Inner West Light Rail to Dulwich Hill, more rolling stock was needed to support services and run alongside the Variotrams that had been providing services on the line since the first section opened in 1997. A tender for six Urbos 3s was awarded to Construcciones y Auxiliar de Ferrocarriles (CAF) in August 2012. The first unit arrived in Sydney on 19 December 2013 and entered service on 24 July 2014. All were in service by August, allowing the leased Urbos 2s to be returned to Spain.

On 11 October 2013, the Government announced an order for six additional Urbos 3s to replace the Variotrams. All Urbos 3s from the additional order had entered service by the end of June 2015.

The Urbos 3s are approximately 33 metres (108 ft) long and feature two double and two single doors on each side. The seats on the first batch are generally in the transverse configuration – at 90 degrees to the sides of the vehicle. The second batch replace some of the transverse seats with longitudinal seating, providing more standing room. Digital voice announcements and internal dot-matrix displays provide information about the next stop. They have a standard capacity of 206 passengers and a crush capacity of 272. The vehicles are numbered 2112, 2114–2124. 2113 was skipped due to superstition, particularly among the Chinese who travel to the Star casino by light rail, about numbers ending in 13.

In June 2021, a contract with CAF for four Urbos 100 (a variant on the Urbos 3) five-module unit was secured.

On 28 October 2021, service was suspended on the Inner West Light Rail after cracking in welds was discovered in some of the Urbos 3 vehicles during routine inspections.

==== Parramatta Light Rail ====
Thirteen Urbos 100 carriages were procured for the first stage of the Parramatta Light Rail. Each tram is 45 metres (148 ft) long and consist of seven modules. These vehicles will support wire-free operation using batteries, which will be utilised on the on-street sections of the line around Parramatta and Westmead.

=== Citadis 305 ===
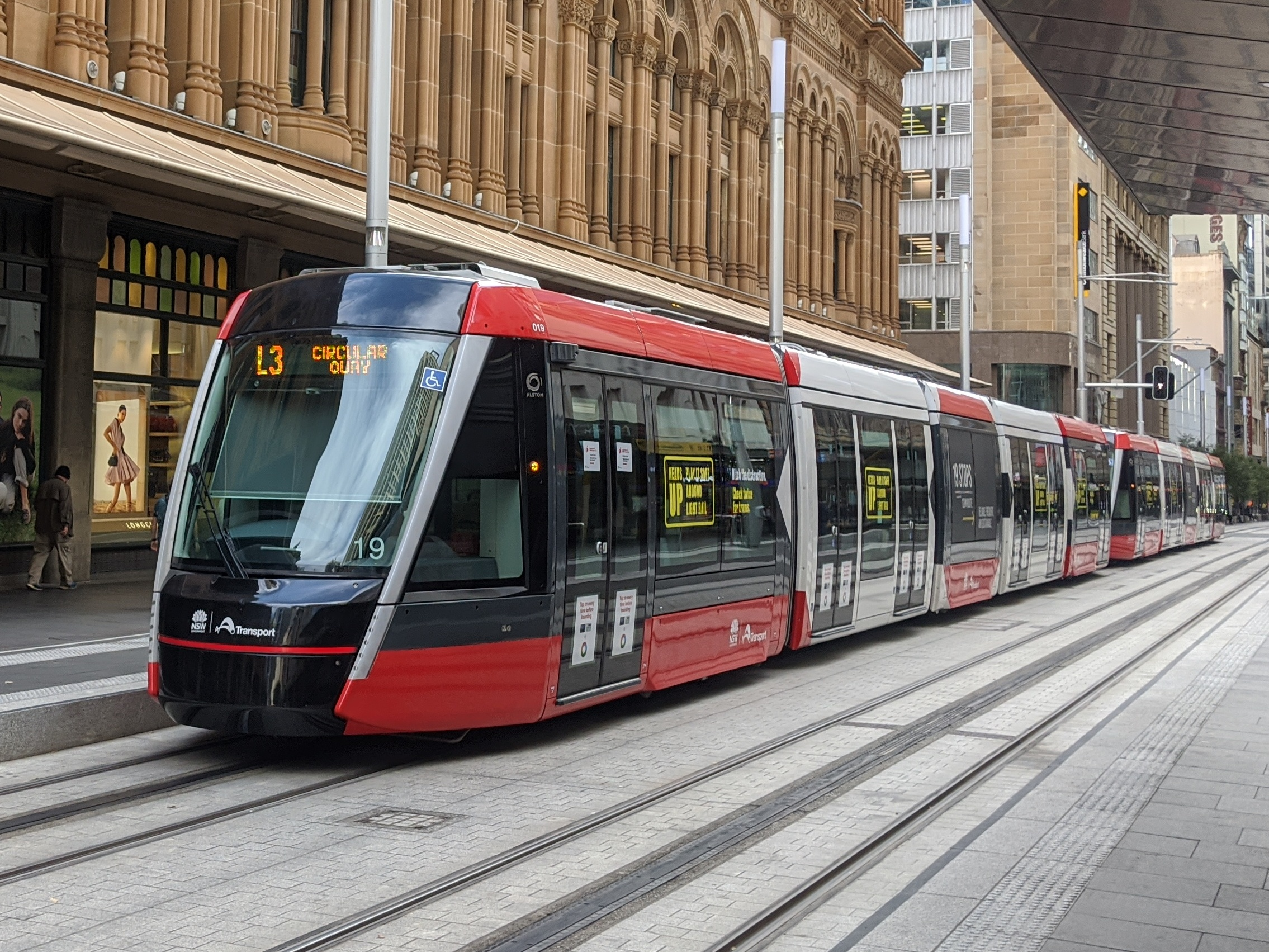
Citadis 305

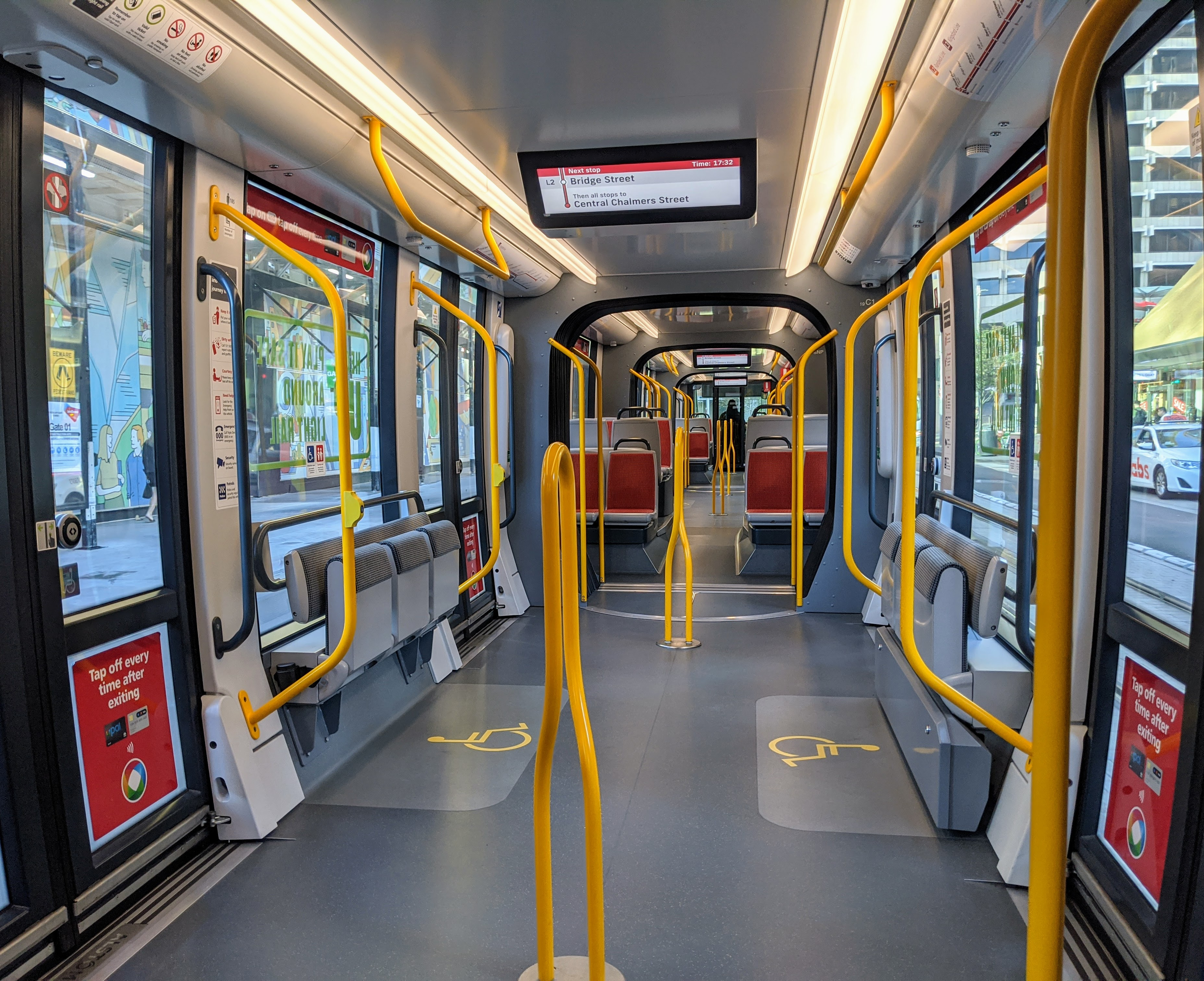
Interior

As part of the winning consortium to build and operate the CBD and South East Light Rail, Alstom supplied sixty Citadis 305 trams. Each vehicle consists of five sections, and they are coupled together to operate in pairs. Original plans for the line intended for the trams to be approximately 45 metres (148 ft) long and operate as single units. Wire-free operation in a section of George Street between Bathurst Street and Circular Quay was to be achieved via battery storage. In December 2014, it was announced that Alstom's proprietary APS technology would be used in place of batteries. The length of the trams would also be reduced, but they would now operate in pairs, giving each pair a total length of approximately 67 metres (220 ft).

The first unit was completed in May 2017. The first six were manufactured in La Rochelle, France, the remaining 54 in Barcelona, Spain. They are numbered 001–060.

After the entire Urbos 3 fleet of the Inner West Light Rail was withdrawn for repairs in November 2021, Citadis trams were borrowed from the CBD and South East Light Rail and tested on the Inner West Light Rail from December 2021. The Citadis vehicles began services on the Inner West Light Rail on 12 February 2022 on a temporary basis until the Urbos 3 fleet could be repaired and brought back into service. They continue to operate following the reintroduction of the Urbos 3s.

=== Withdrawn ===
==== Variotram ====
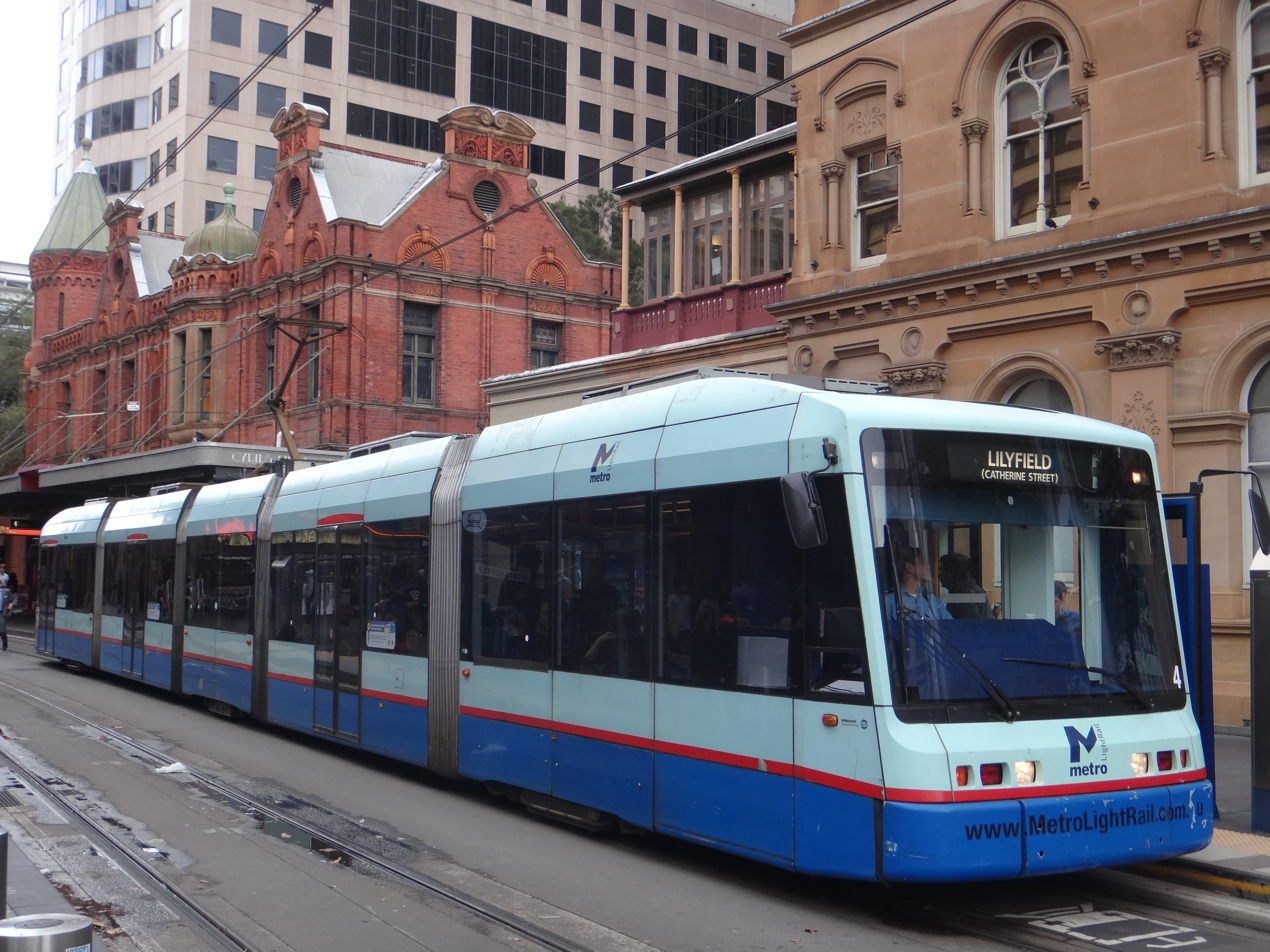
Variotram in Metro Light Rail livery

The network's original rolling stock was the Variotram which was introduced with the opening of the first section of the Inner West Light Rail in 1997. Seven German-designed vehicles were manufactured by Adtranz in Dandenong. The Variotram design is modular and was extended for the Sydney system. The capacity of the vehicles was 217 passengers, of which 74 were seated. The first was damaged in an accident near Tarcutta while on its delivery run and had to be returned to Melbourne for repairs. On tests up to three trams were coupled together allowing a maximum capacity of 600 passengers if required.

The vehicles had a floor-to-rail height of 30 centimetres (12 in) and the bogies had no axles between the wheels and were powered by hub motors. The design weight was reduced to compensate for the addition of climate-control air-conditioning equipment. Each was fitted with three double doors on each side which had enhanced safety systems with obstacle detection interlocked with the traction system. Seats were generally in the transverse configuration – at 90 degrees to the sides of the vehicle. In 2014, the original external destination rolls were replaced with dot-matrix displays and digital voice announcements were installed. There were no internal displays. The last Variotram was withdrawn from service after operating overnight between Central and The Star on 27/28 May 2015.

After sustaining damage in a derailment at Glebe on 7 October 2013, Variotram number 2106 was scrapped. The remaining six Variotrams were placed into storage in Penrith during the first half of 2015. Having been retained by Transport Heritage NSW, in October 2018, 2107 was placed in the custody of the Sydney Tramway Museum, Loftus. The remaining five (2101–2105) were scrapped in early 2018.

==== Urbos 2 ====
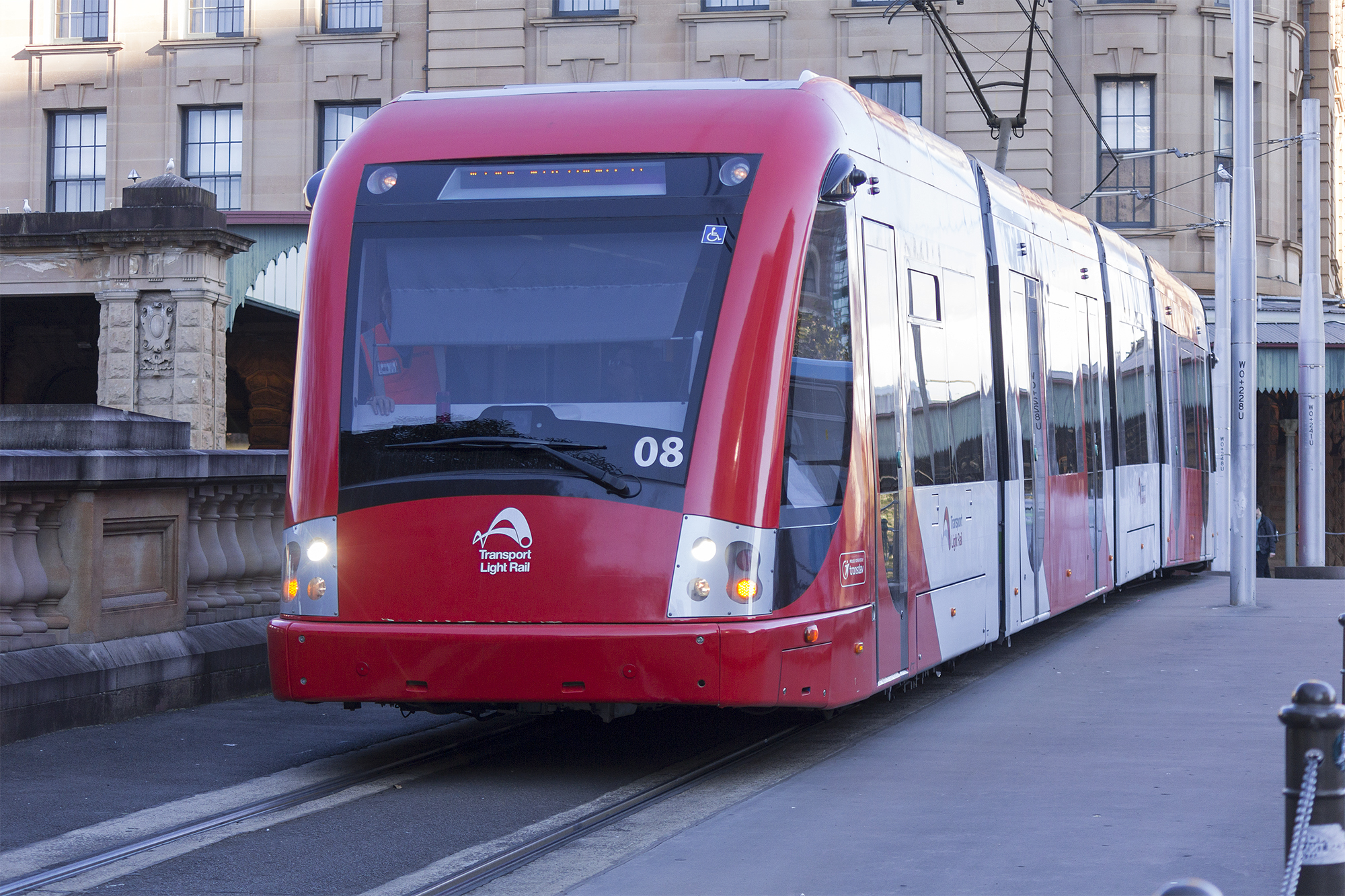
CAF Urbos 2

Four leased CAF Urbos 2 trams were introduced on the Inner West Light Rail in 2014. They entered service to coincide with the extension of the line to Dulwich Hill, supplementing the Variotrams and ensuring service frequencies on the line could be maintained. The four trams had previously operated in Spain. Three units (2108–2110) were from Vélez-Málaga, where they operated between 2006 and 2012. The other tram (2111) was from Seville. The first Urbos 2 arrived in Sydney on 4 September 2013. Delivery was completed in November. The trams entered service on 22 March 2014, five days before the opening of the extension to Dulwich Hill. Following the introduction of the Urbos 3 trams in July 2014, the Urbos 2s were withdrawn and returned to Spain. The Urbos 2s were unpopular with passengers and attracted complaints.

The trams featured four double and two single doors on each side. The seats were unpadded and were generally built in the longitudinal seating configuration – running parallel to the sides of the vehicle's body. Digital voice announcements and internal dot-matrix displays provided information about the next stop.

== Patronage ==
The following table lists patronage figures for the network during the corresponding financial year. Australia's financial years start on 1 July and end on 30 June. Major events that affected the number of journeys made or how patronage is measured are included as notes.

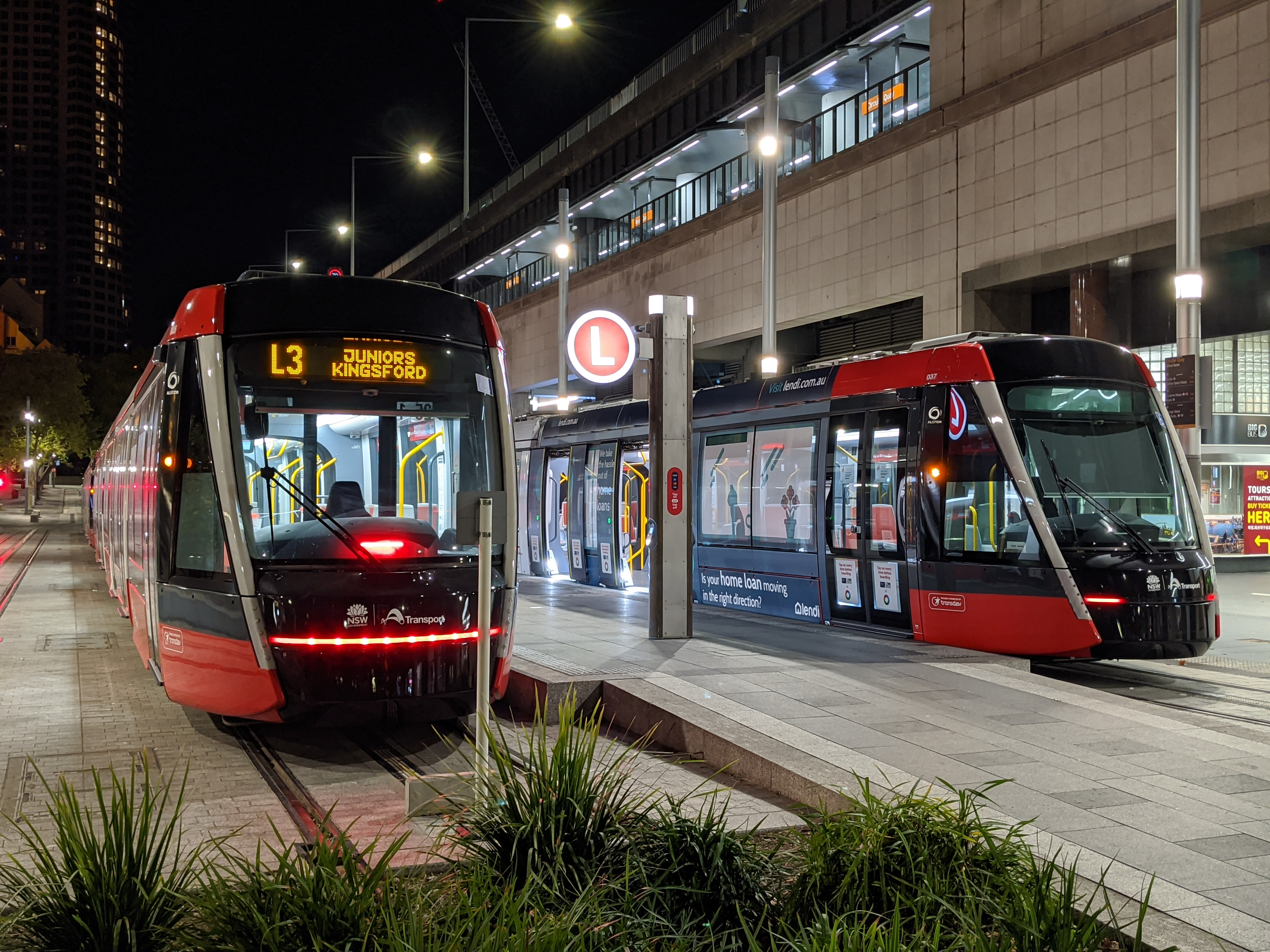
Terminating trams at Circular Quay

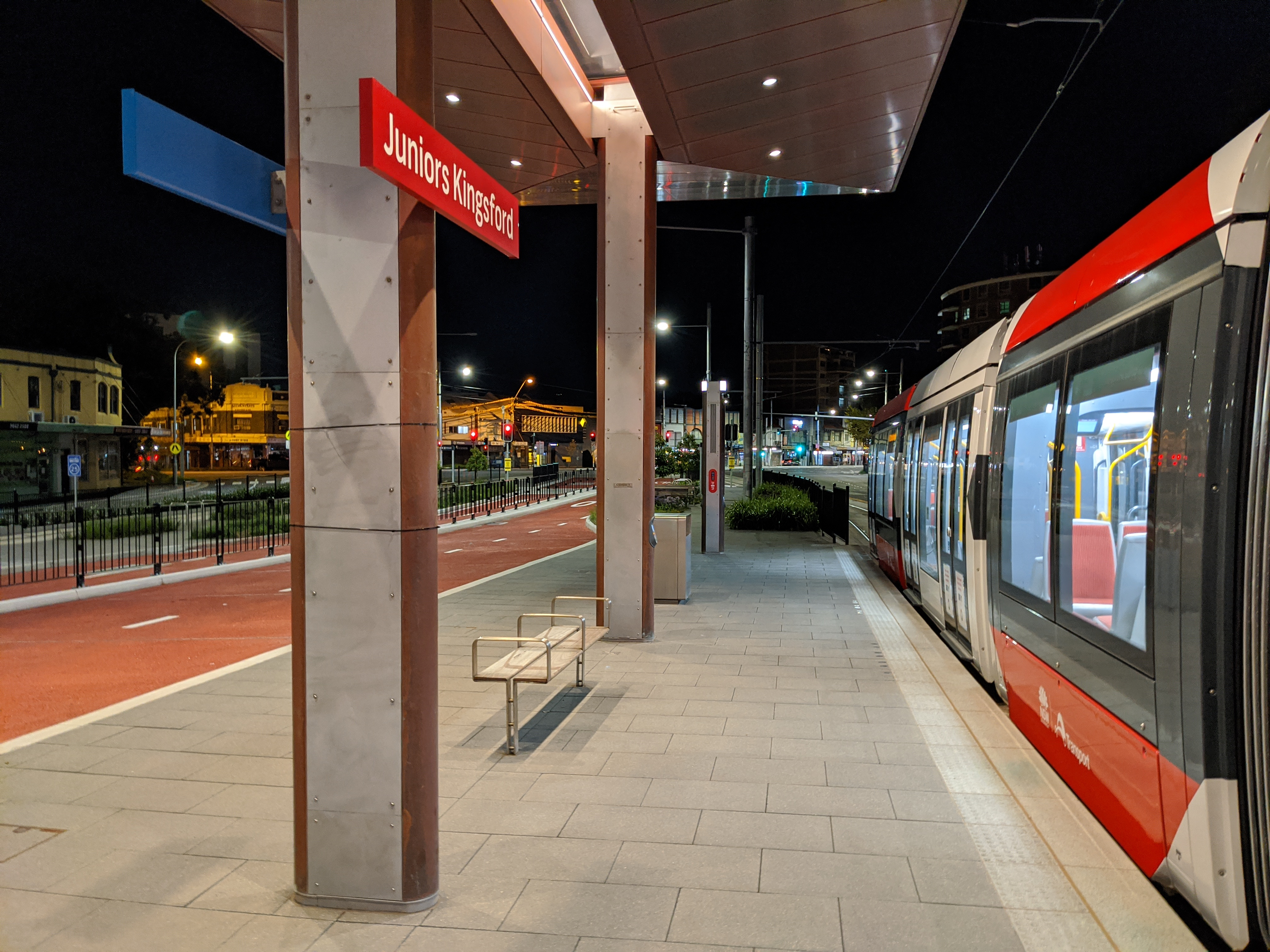
The Kingsford branch terminus, Juniors Kingsford

Sydney light rail patronage by financial year
Year	2010–11	2011–12	2012–13	2013–14	2014–15	2015–16	2016–17	2017–18	2018–19	2019–20	2020–21	2021–22	2022–23
Patronage (millions)	2.7 (Note: Partial integration with main Sydney ticketing system in June 2011)	4.0	4.2	3.9 (Note: Services suspended for much of October 2013 after double derailment) (Note: Dulwich Hill extension opened in March 2014)	6.1 (Note: Opal introduced in December 2014)	9.7	10.0 (Note: Non-Opal tickets discontinued in August 2016)	10.3	11.1	14.4 (Note: L2 Randwick Line opened in December 2019 and L3 Kingsford Line opened in April 2020. Patronage was lower than anticipated due to people staying at home and not taking public transport to school or work during the COVID-19 pandemic)	17.0	14.9	32.5
References													

2025-26 Sydney light rail patronage by line (Note: Figures based on Opal tap on and tap off data.)
Inner West Light Rail	9,105,671
CBD and South East Light Rail	16,253,187
CBD and South East Light Rail	16,928,200
Parramatta Light Rail	4,239,605

2025 Transport for NSW patronage in Sydney by mode
Mode	Patronage	% of total
Metro	71,956,399	10.82
Train	284,972,638	42.84
Bus	242,983,455	36.53
Ferry	18,633,461	2.80
Light rail	46,640,237	7.01
Total	665,186,190	100.00

=== Ticketing and fares ===
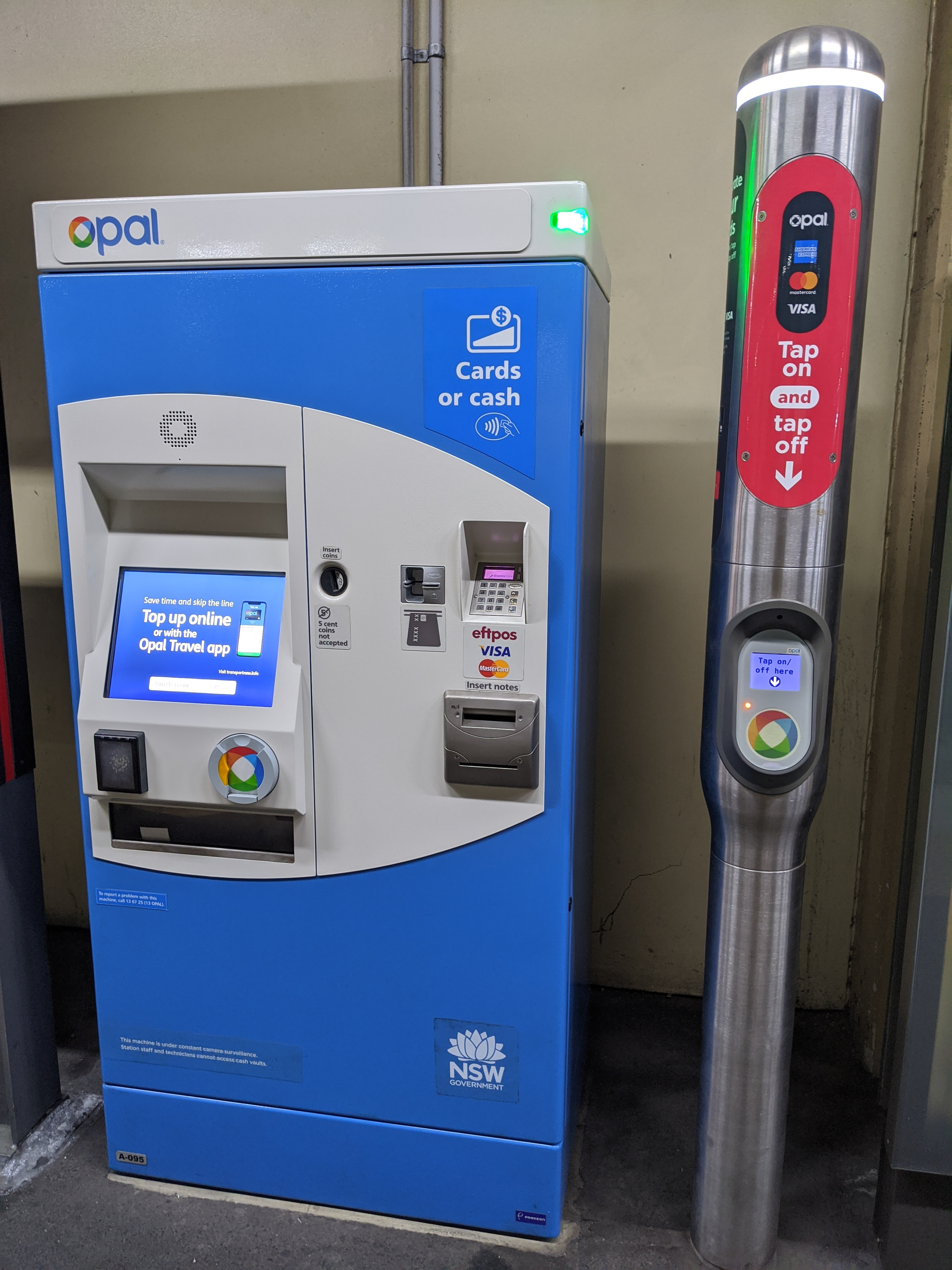
An Opal ticket machine and an Opal reader at Pyrmont Bay

The smartcard-based Opal card ticketing system, which was introduced to the network on 1 December 2014, is valid on metro, train, bus, ferry and light rail services. Different fares apply for these modes, except that the same fares apply to light rail and buses. However, they are treated as separate modes for patronage counting purposes. Light rail stops feature Opal top up machines that also sell Opal single trip tickets. The single trip tickets are more expensive than the standard Opal fare. They are only valid for travel on light rail and must be used on the day of purchase. The following table lists Opal fares for reusable smartcards and single trip tickets.

Bus or light rail
As of 14 July 2025	0–3 km	3–8 km	>8 km
Adult cards & contactless (peak)	$3.30	$4.49	$5.77
Adult cards & contactless (off-peak)	$2.31	$3.14	$4.03
Other cards (peak)	$1.65	$2.24	$2.88^
Other cards (off-peak)	$1.15	$1.56	$2.01
Adult single trip	$4.00	$5.40	$6.90
Child/Youth single trip	$2.00	$2.70	$3.40

^ = $2.50 for Senior/Pensioner cardholders

Fares are calculated using a straight line distance between the origin and destination stops. No two stops on the existing line are located more than 8 kilometres (5.0 mi) from each other using this method, so the >8 km (5.0 mi) band does not apply to light rail services.

When it first opened, the Inner West Light Rail used its paper-based ticketing system. Paper tickets were originally sold from ticket machines on stop platforms but were later issued by conductors on board. During the 2010s, this system gradually merged with the broader Sydney ticketing system, culminating in the introduction of Opal and the withdrawal of all other tickets. This process was completed on 1 August 2016.

== Potential extensions ==
Several transport corridors have significant potential to allow for the growth of the network beyond its current route structure.

=== Anzac Parade ===
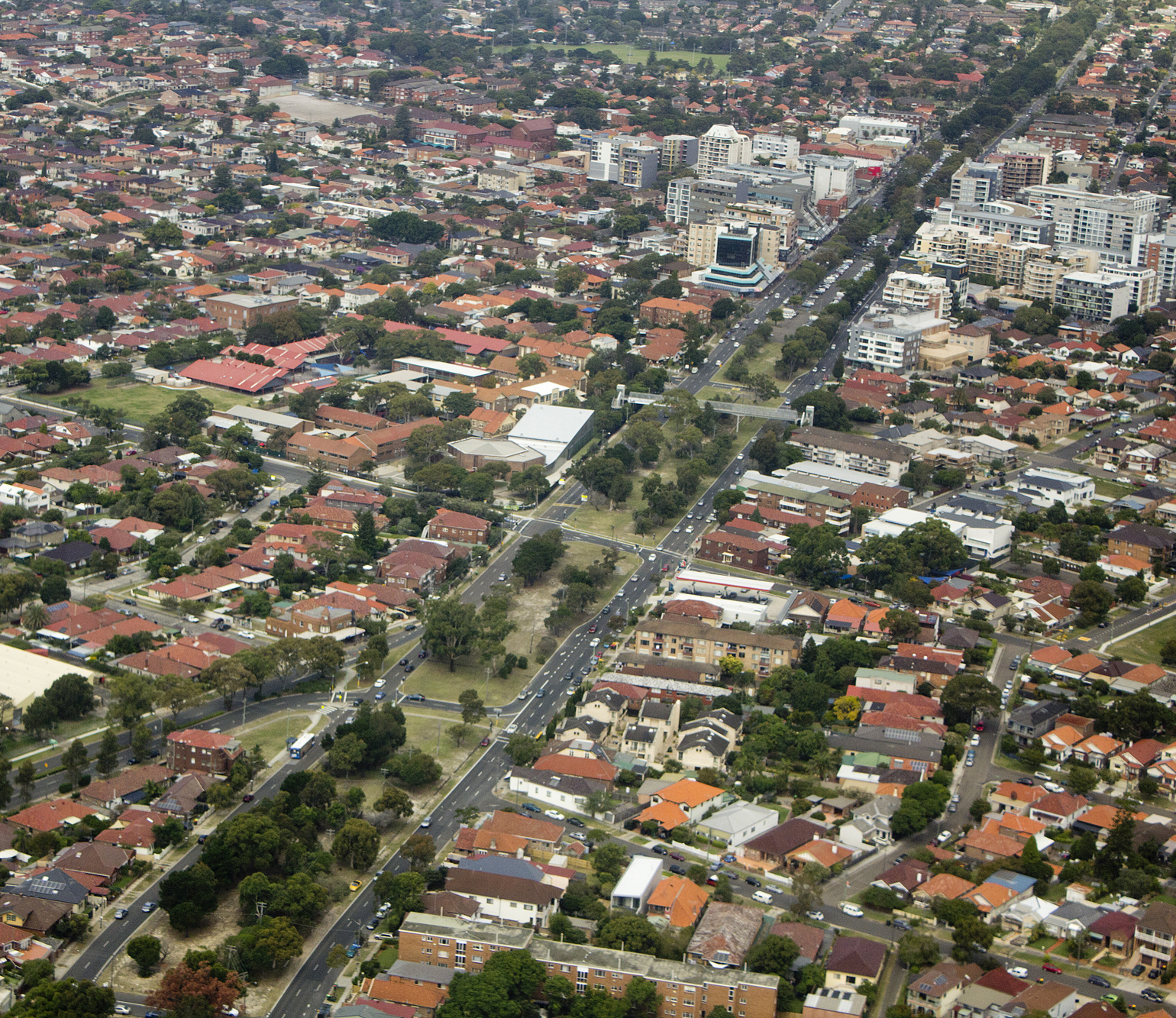
Anzac Parade and Maroubra Junction as seen from the air. There have been numerous proposals to utilise the large median strip as a tram corridor.

The New South Wales Government's 2012 policy document entitled Sydney's Light Rail Future proposed investigating an extension of the CBD and South East Light Rail along the southern Anzac Parade corridor.

By 2014, an initial investigation had commenced. Three potential options were examined; a 1.9-kilometre (1.2 mi) extension to Maroubra Junction, a 5.1-kilometre (3.2 mi) extension to Malabar and an 8.2-kilometre (5.1 mi) extension to La Perouse.

The government's 2018 Greater Sydney Services and Infrastructure Plan included a proposal for an extension to Maroubra Junction. The extension would however not be developed for at least 10 years.

In 2026, Randwick City Council proposed a project to build bike paths along the median of Anzac Parade, which would utilise the tramway corridor if built.

=== The Bays Precinct ===
The Bays Precinct is a large waterfront area to the west of the Sydney CBD being proposed for urban renewal by the New South Wales Government. The southern part of the precinct is served by the existing Inner West Light Rail. A planning document released by the government in October 2015 suggested light rail could be extended to the northern part of the precinct, possibly using the Glebe Island Bridge.

The government's 2018 Greater Sydney Services and Infrastructure Plan included a proposal for a new line from Leichhardt North to Pyrmont via The Bays Precinct and the Glebe Island Bridge. It would connect with the existing Inner West Light Rail at both ends. The line would not be developed for at least 10 years.

=== Parramatta Light Rail extensions ===
The New South Wales Government's 2012 policy document entitled Sydney's Light Rail Future proposed investigating a Western Sydney light rail network. This led to several corridors being investigated in the early planning stages of the Parramatta Light Rail project. The final corridors selected for development were announced in 2015.

In early 2017, Transport for NSW had begun an investigation into an extension of the Parramatta Light Rail from Carlingford to Epping.

The government's 2018 Greater Sydney Services and Infrastructure Plan proposed investigating unspecified extensions to the network. The extensions would not be developed for at least 10 years.

In 2024, the NSW Legislative Council Inquiry into Current and future public transport needs in Western Sydney recommended "that the Government urgently investigate extending Stage 2 of the Parramatta Light Rail project so that the line no longer terminates at the Carter Street precinct but continues from there to terminate at Lidcombe railway station". This recommendation has been endorsed by Cumberland Council and public transport advocacy groups such as EcoTransit Sydney.

In September 2024, the Minns Labor Government committed $2.1 billion to stage two of Parramatta Light Rail to be routed through Melrose Park and Wentworth Point with stops in Sydney Olympic Park, Rydalmere, Ermington and Camellia.

=== Parramatta Road and Green Square ===
There have been a number of attempts to redevelop Parramatta Road. Many of these plans, but not all, include a light rail component. Some plans include a line continuing to Green Square.

As of 2026, ALTRAC Light Rail have proposed that a light rail corridor between Parramatta Road and Green Square be developed. The ALTRAC Light Rail consortium was previously named Connecting Sydney and includes Transdev, Alstom and Acciona. ALTRAC is 95% owned by John Laing Group and 5% owned by Acciona Concesiones.

=== Bondi ===
In 2011, Waverley Council advocated for the extension of the light rail network to link the current infrastructure to Bondi Junction and Bondi Beach. The council commissioned AECOM to undertake a feasibility assessment of the reintroduction of light rail on the corridor between Bondi Beach and Bondi Junction (Stage 1) and onto the CBD (Stage 2) to achieve mass transit of passengers and requested Transport for NSW consider the CBD to Bondi Beach corridor as a priority route in the Sydney Light Rail Plan.

== See also ==
- Railways in Sydney
- Public transport in Sydney
- Newcastle Light Rail
- List of tram and light-rail transit systems
