= Sydney Monorail =

Monorail in Australia (1988–2013)

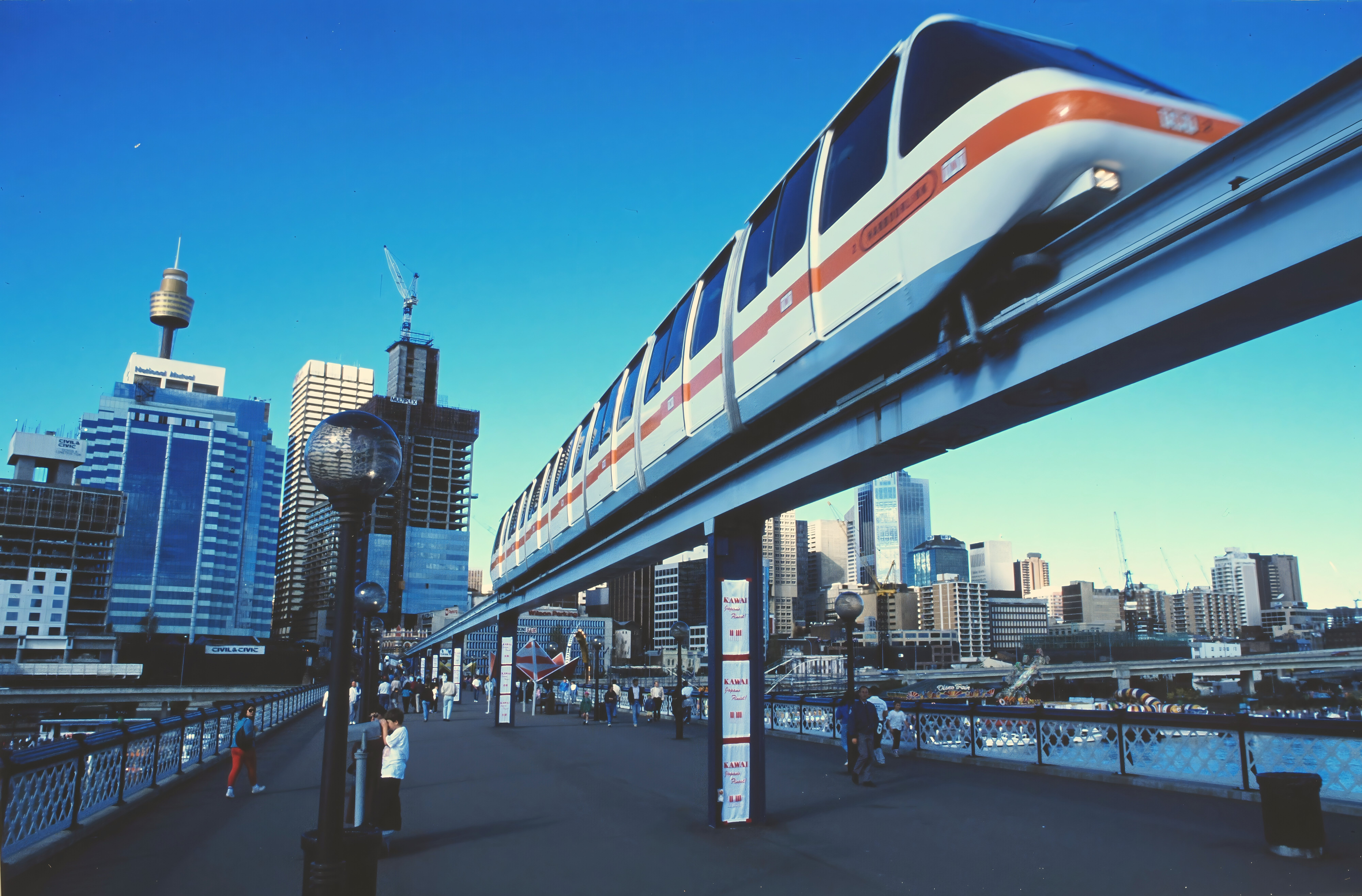
- The monorail crossing Pyrmont Bridge (1990)

Overview
- Status: Dismantled
- Owner: Metro Transport Sydney
- Locale: Sydney, New South Wales, Australia
- Stations: 8

Service
- Type: Straddle-beam Monorail loop
- Operator: Veolia Transport Sydney
- Rolling stock: Von Roll Mk III

History
- Opened: 21 July 1988
- Closed: 30 June 2013

Technical
- Line length: 3.6 km (2.2 mi)
- Electrification: 500 V 50 Hz 3-phase AC third rail

The Sydney Monorail (originally TNT Harbourlink and later Metro Monorail) was a single-loop monorail in Sydney, that connected Darling Harbour, Chinatown and the Sydney central business and shopping districts. It opened on 21 July 1988 and closed on 30 June 2013.

There were eight stations on the 3.6-kilometre (2.237 mi) loop, with up to six trains operating simultaneously. It served major attractions and facilities such as the Powerhouse Museum, Sydney Aquarium and Sydney Convention & Exhibition Centre. The system was operated by Veolia Transport Sydney, a former subsidiary of Veolia Transport and a subsidiary of Veolia Transdev at the time of cessation.

== History ==
As part of the redevelopment of 50 ha (123.553 acres) of land at Darling Harbour, it was proposed to build a transport link to the Sydney central business district. Sydney City Council preferred a light rail line, however in November 1985 Transport Minister Laurie Brereton announced a monorail would be built.

Before November 1984, the consultants Pak-Poy & Kneebone Pty. Ltd. were engaged by the Ministry of Transport and the Public Works Department "to assess the physical and financial feasibility of new light rail systems in the Sydney Central Business District". The assessment was "with particular application to the Darling Harbour Re-Development" but included possible extension to other locations.

In "early 1985" the Darling Harbour Authority received more than 20 expressions of interest for a proposed people mover. The monorail was hinted at in the August 1985 Glebe Island Arterial (Anzac Bridge) Environmental Impact Statement before the public announcement. It stated a "people mover" was being considered at Darling Harbour, but that details were not available at the time of writing. Other options under consideration included new ferry services and a shuttle rail service to a new passenger station near the Powerhouse Museum. TNT's monorail proposal won formal cabinet selection in October 1985.

The first test services ran in October 1987 on a 500-metre section at Darling Harbour. Initially operated by TNT Harbourlink, the monorail opened on 21 July 1988 after a construction period of 26 months. The monorail was originally due to be completed by January 1988, to celebrate the Australian Bicentenary. TNT Harbourlink was awarded a 50-year concession until 2038.

The original operation hours were to be 06:00 to midnight, but after two years of operation patronage counts were half those expected, and planned stations at Market Street (to be named Casino, as part of the gaming venue planned to be built on the site) and Harbour Street (to be named Gardenside) were not built for some time.

=== Metro Transport Sydney ownership ===
After TNT was purchased by PTT in January 1997 and merged to form TNT Post Group in 1998, TNT decided to dispose of its businesses not centred on mail and logistics services, including the Sydney monorail. On 10 August 1998, TNT sold the monorail to CGEA Transport Sydney, which was owned by CGEA Transport (later renamed Connex, then Veolia Transport) (51%) and Australian Infrastructure Fund (19%), Utilities Trust of Australia (19%) and Legal & General (11%). The latter three also owned the Sydney Light Rail Company (SLRC), which owned the Metro Light Rail (now Sydney Light Rail) on a 30.5 year concession since 1997 by the Government of New South Wales. Connex (renamed from CGEA Transport in 1999) sold its share of the monorail in early 2001 to the SLRC, but remained as the operator of the monorail. As a result, SLRC owned both the monorail and light rail and combined with CGEA Transport to form Metro Transport Sydney.

The monorail operator was renamed to Veolia Transport Sydney in 2005 as part of the global Veolia rebranding from Connex to Veolia Transport. In 2011, Veolia Transport globally merged with the old Transdev to form Veolia Transdev, and Veolia Transport Sydney became a subsidiary of Veolia Transdev (now Transdev).

=== Government takeover and cessation ===
The Government of New South Wales bought both the monorail and the light rail service from Metro Transport Sydney on 23 March 2012 to enable it to extend the light rail system without having to negotiate with the private owners, and to remove the monorail from the area near Haymarket required for the expanded Sydney Convention & Exhibition Centre. Veolia Transport Sydney continued to operate the light rail and monorail after the government takeover.

The monorail ceased operating on 30 June 2013 and all sections of track and some of the stations have been dismantled. Around 70 million passenger journeys were made on the line during its lifetime. Two carriages and 10 metres of track have been preserved at the Powerhouse Museum. Two carriages are being used as meeting rooms at Google's Pyrmont offices.

== Ticketing and concessions ==
Front and Back of the last two generation of payment cards

Payment for single journeys was made by tokens inserted into the turnstile. For multiple journeys, customers could purchase pre-paid cards. TNT launched the Harbourlink card shortly after the monorail opened. The next card type was introduced when CGEA Transport (later Metro Transport Sydney) took over monorail operations. This card was based on magnetic stripe technology and called the METROCard. Shortly before the closure of the Monorail, a new contactless card was introduced called smart.

== Technology ==
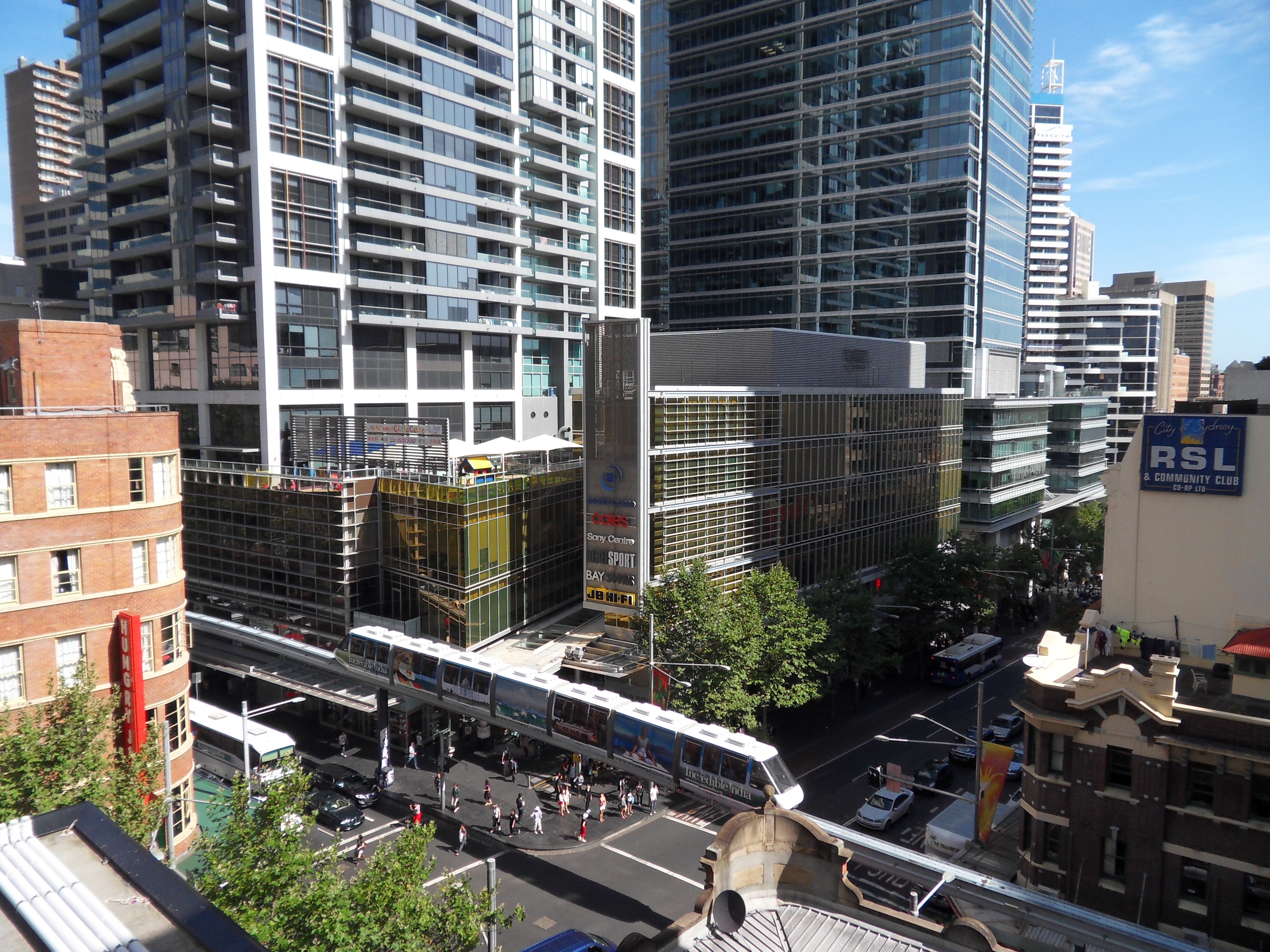
The Monorail crossing George Street in 2010

The track was a steel box girder of 94 centimetres (37 in) width, raised at a minimum height of 5.5 metres (18 ft) from ground level on steel columns 20 to 40 metres (66 to 131 ft) apart. The minimum curve radius was 20 metres (66 ft), and the maximum gradient 4.4% uphill and 6.5% downhill.

Power was supplied at 500 V 50 Hz 3-phase AC to power the train, via a sheathed conductor below the running plate of the track. A control rail was also provided for train control, and a generator provided to clear trains from the track in emergencies. The train control and maintenance facility was located between Convention and Paddy's Market stations, where a traverser moved trains in and out of service.

Each station stop took 40 seconds, including the time to decelerate, board passengers, and accelerate again. A complete circuit of the route took 12 minutes. It was originally intended for the system to operate automatically, but after a number of breakdowns soon after opening, it was decided to retain drivers, who occupied the first car of each train.

== Rolling stock ==
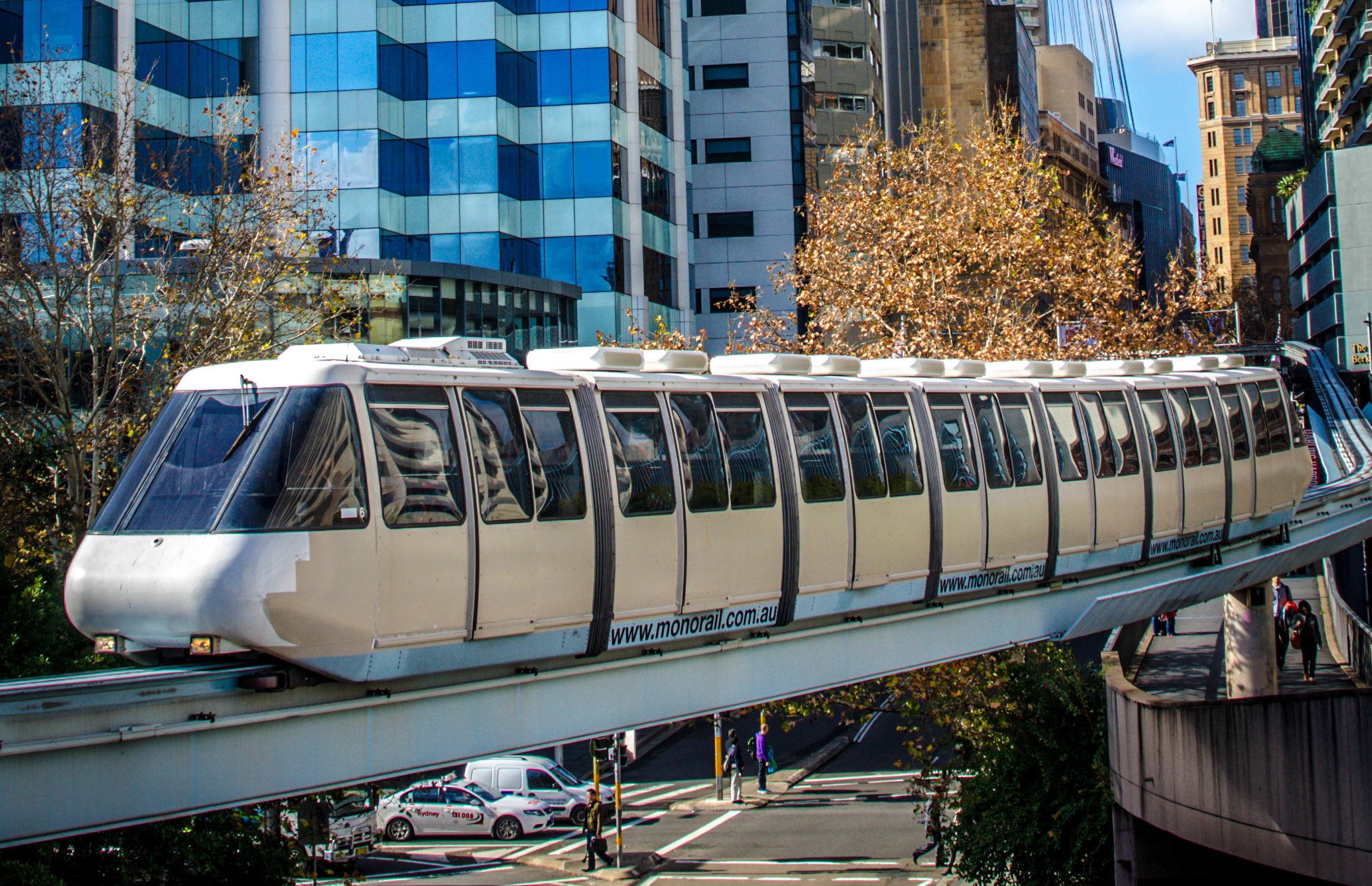
The Von Roll Mk III monorail cars

Delivered in 1987, six trains of seven carriages were built by Von Roll Holding to the Mk III specification. Each seated 48 passengers, with the driver occupying the leading carriage. (They were designed to seat 56, using all seven carriages.) The first was displayed at the Trans Public Show in Geneva, Switzerland in May 1987.

The monorail trains ran on rubber wheels, and each seven-car train had six 37-kilowatt (50 hp) traction motors, permitting a normal operating speed of 33 km/h (21 mph). The doors of each car were automatic, and the floor level was self-adjusting via an automatic suspension system. Each train was 32.12 metres (105.4 ft) long, 2.06 metres (6 ft 9 in) wide, and 2.6 metres (8 ft 6 in) high.

Set 1 was stored following a significant collision between it and Set 4 in early 2010. The last carriage in Set 1 was removed from the set, and used to replace the damaged last carriage in Set 4. When operations ceased in June 2013, sets 2 – 6 were operational.

== Stations ==
The monorail operated in a single anticlockwise loop with stops at the following stations (in order):

| Name | Image | Notes |
|---|---|---|
| City Centre | City Centre Station | A temporary station existed until mid-1989, during construction of the City Centre Shopping Arcade, the temporary station was partially suspended above Pitt Street |
| Darling Park | Darling Park Station | Originally planned to be named Casino, but Sydney's casino was eventually built in Pyrmont |
| Harbourside | Harbourside Station | Located adjacent to the Harbourside Shopping Centre at the western end of the Pyrmont Bridge, demolished in June 2023 |
| Convention | Convention Station | Served the Sydney Convention & Exhibition Centre |
| Exhibition | | During the 1990s and early 2000s, there was also a station at the former Sydney Exhibition Centre complex where the current light rail station (opened 1997) stops. |
| Paddy's Markets | Paddy's Markets Station | Formerly named Powerhouse Museum, and originally Haymarket |
| Chinatown | Chinatown Station | Located inside the One Dixon Street shopping centre, opened in 2001 as Garden Plaza it closed on 26 July 2004, and then reopened as Chinatown station on 18 December 2006 By 2012 the station was unstaffed and only open between 07:00 and 09:00 on weekdays only, with the station entrance locked outside these hours |
| World Square | World Square Station | Temporary station in operation until 2005, when the station was rebuilt and incorporated into the new adjacent building |
| The Galeries Victoria | Galleries Victoria Station | Originally named Park Plaza. The temporary entrance provided until 2000, when the station was incorporated into the new adjacent building. Now a Fitness First gym, which reuses some of the monorail station's original functions and features. |

== Maintenance and control facilities ==
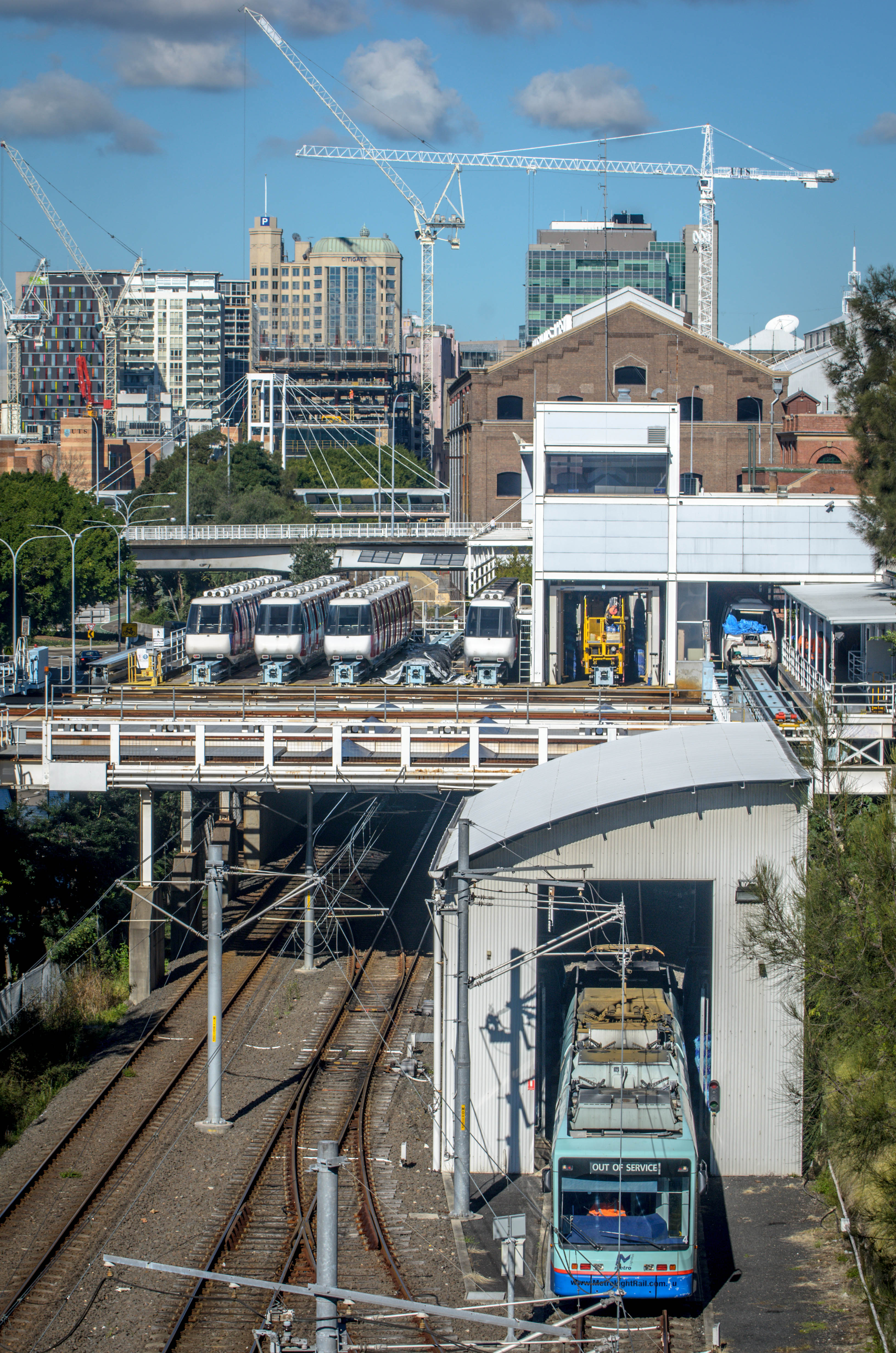
Traverser and maintenance & control facilities with the Inner West Light Rail passing underneath in July 2013

The six monorail units were maintained in a purpose-built facility in Pyrmont. A traverser allowed monorail cars to be removed from the main track for maintenance or stabling. Maintenance of track and stations was conducted at night with two special vehicles, named "Buggy" and "Mule".

The facility also housed the control room (located above the maintenance area), as well as administration and staff amenities.

== Criticism ==
The decision to build the monorail over other forms of public transport such as light rail was seen as a political decision. The government enacted legislation to exempt the project from certain sections of the Environmental Planning and Assessment Act 1979, and an environmental impact study was refused.

The activist group Sydney Citizens Against the Proposed Monorail (SCAPM) was formed in 1985, which organised rallies against the monorail project during and before its construction. Former Sydney City Council alderman Jack Mundey was an active leader of SCAPM who scrutinised the government's handling of the project. The monorail was also condemned by the Royal Australian Institute of Architects, the Royal Australian Planning Institute, and Liberal opposition leader Nick Greiner, who would inherit the project in the following 1988 state election.

== Incidents ==
On 28 July 1988, an electrical fault caused the system to cease operating. Fifty passengers were stranded in carriages for two hours between 3:50 and 5:50 pm. TNT Harbourlink was criticised for failing to call emergency services until 5:40; by the time the fire brigade arrived at the scene, the passengers were en route to disembarking at a station.

On 7 July 1992, monorail services were suspended due to a fire in a wool store building which caused a wall to collapse 'within metres' of TNT Harbourlink's central control room offices.

On 27 February 2010, at approximately 16:00, two monorail trains collided at the Darling Park station resulting in hospitalisation of four people.

On 24 September 2012, just before 14:00, an Ausgrid failure in a local underground cable led to a complete shutdown of the system resulting in the need for cherry-pickers to come to rescue approximately 100 stranded passengers, a process which took several hours. It was the first time since 2000 that Fire & Rescue New South Wales had to be called to help people from the line.

== Removal ==
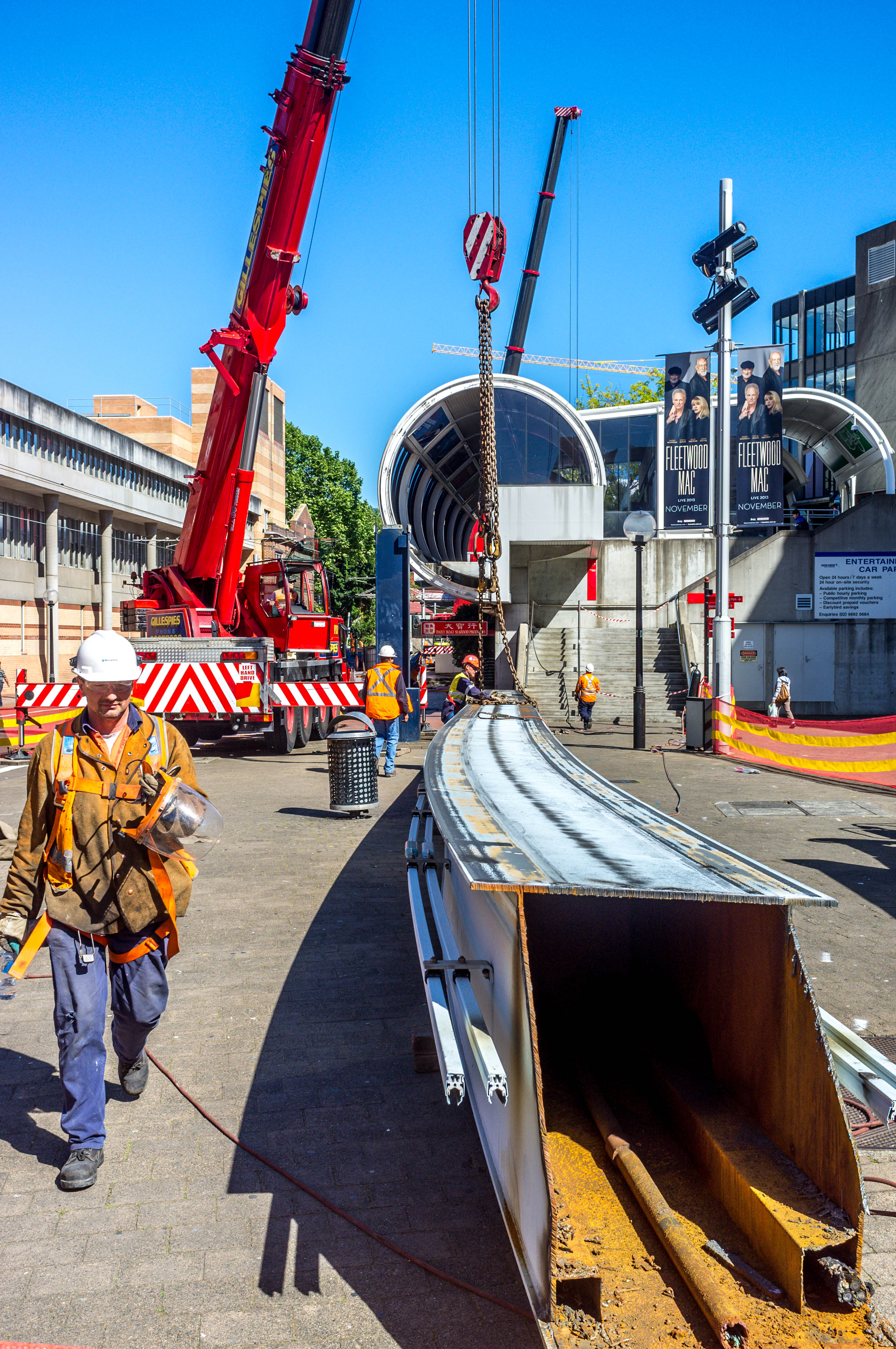
Track being dismantled at Paddy's Markets in September 2013

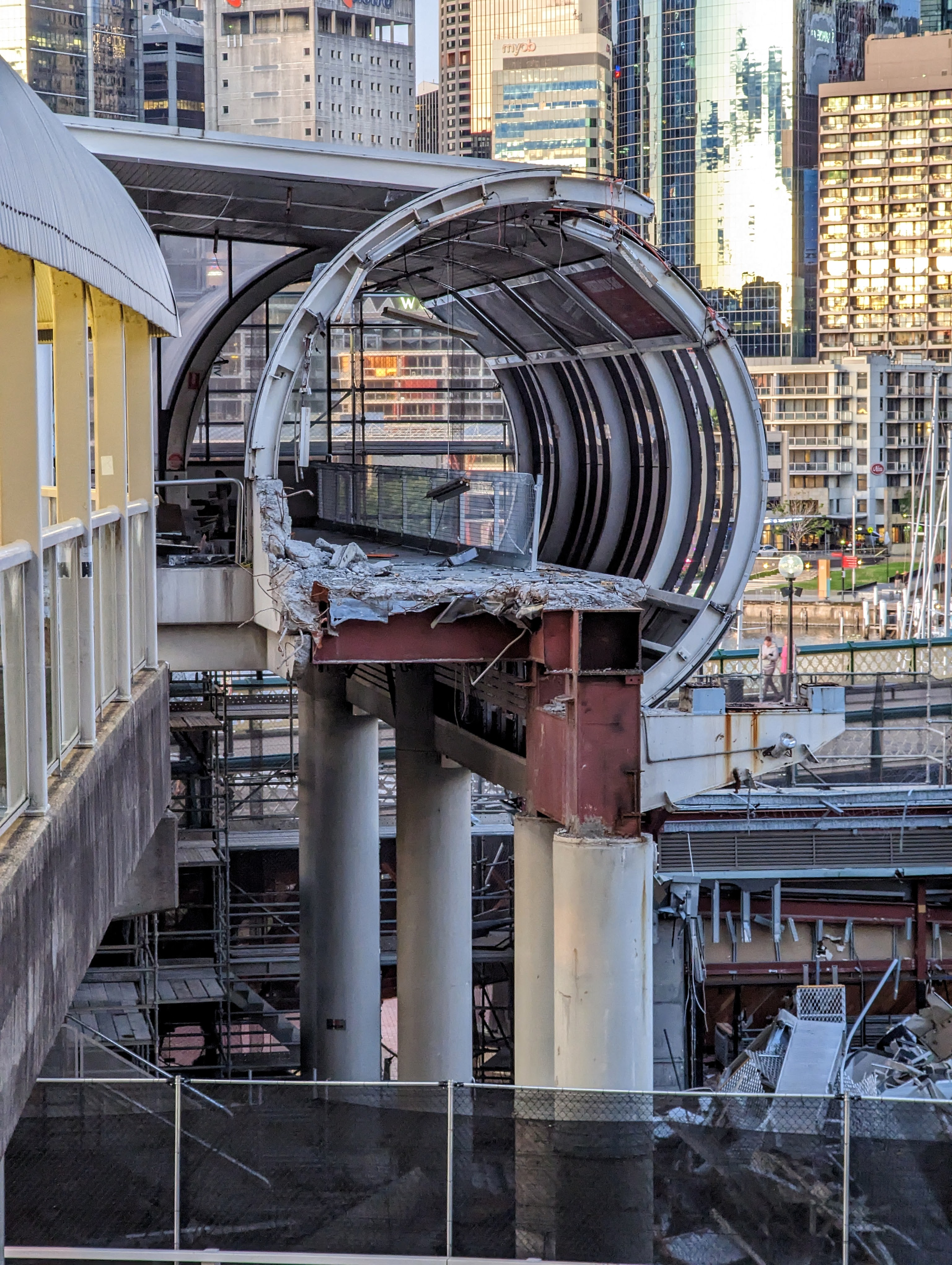
Harbourside monorail station under demolition, May 2023

Transport for New South Wales released a document called "Monorail Removal Project Interpretation Strategy" in July 2013. Premier Barry O'Farrell said on 23 March 2012 regarding its removal:

This is good news for Sydney – it delivers certainty for business wanting to invest in the Darling Harbour precinct and allows the efficient development of the light rail network. [...] The monorail is not integrated with Sydney's wider public transport network and has never been truly embraced by the community. While it has been a controversial part of Sydney's history for more than 20 years, the monorail is reaching the end of its economic life and the NSW Government cannot justify costly upgrades like the purchase of new vehicles required to keep it running. [...] This decision paves the way for the development of a world class Sydney International Convention, Exhibition and Entertainment Precinct as the NSW Government gets on with the job of making NSW number one again.

Deputy Mayor of Hobart, Alderman, Ron Christie unsuccessfully asked the NSW government to donate the monorail to Hobart to allow it to be used on a route from the CBD to the northern suburbs. Google purchased two carriages for use as meeting rooms at its Pyrmont office.

The monorail was demolished in 2013. Sixty steel beams were recycled to build a temporary bridge to take Brookhollow Avenue over Norwest station during its construction between 2014 and 2017. The temporary bridge allowed the station to be dug underneath Brookhollow Avenue, allowing the road to be closed for only a few months instead of three years as originally proposed. The bridge was dismantled in 2017 as the final station structure was being built.

In January 2015, 22 carriages were put up for sale on Gumtree at $3,000 per carriage. Many of these carriages were subsequently sold to an Australian expatriate now living in Taiwan. One was sold to a pair of radio hosts. Four, which comprise the only set of carriages preserved with all running gear that includes both a front and a rear carriage as well as middle carriages, other than the full train preserved by the Sydney Electric Train Society, were sold to a Sydney resident who plans to restore them to running condition.

Three Monorail stations remain: Darling Park, Chinatown, and World Square. The Convention and Galeries Victoria stations were demolished just after the monorail closed, Paddys Market was demolished in 2015, City Centre was demolished in 2019, and Harbourside was demolished in 2023.

== Preservation ==
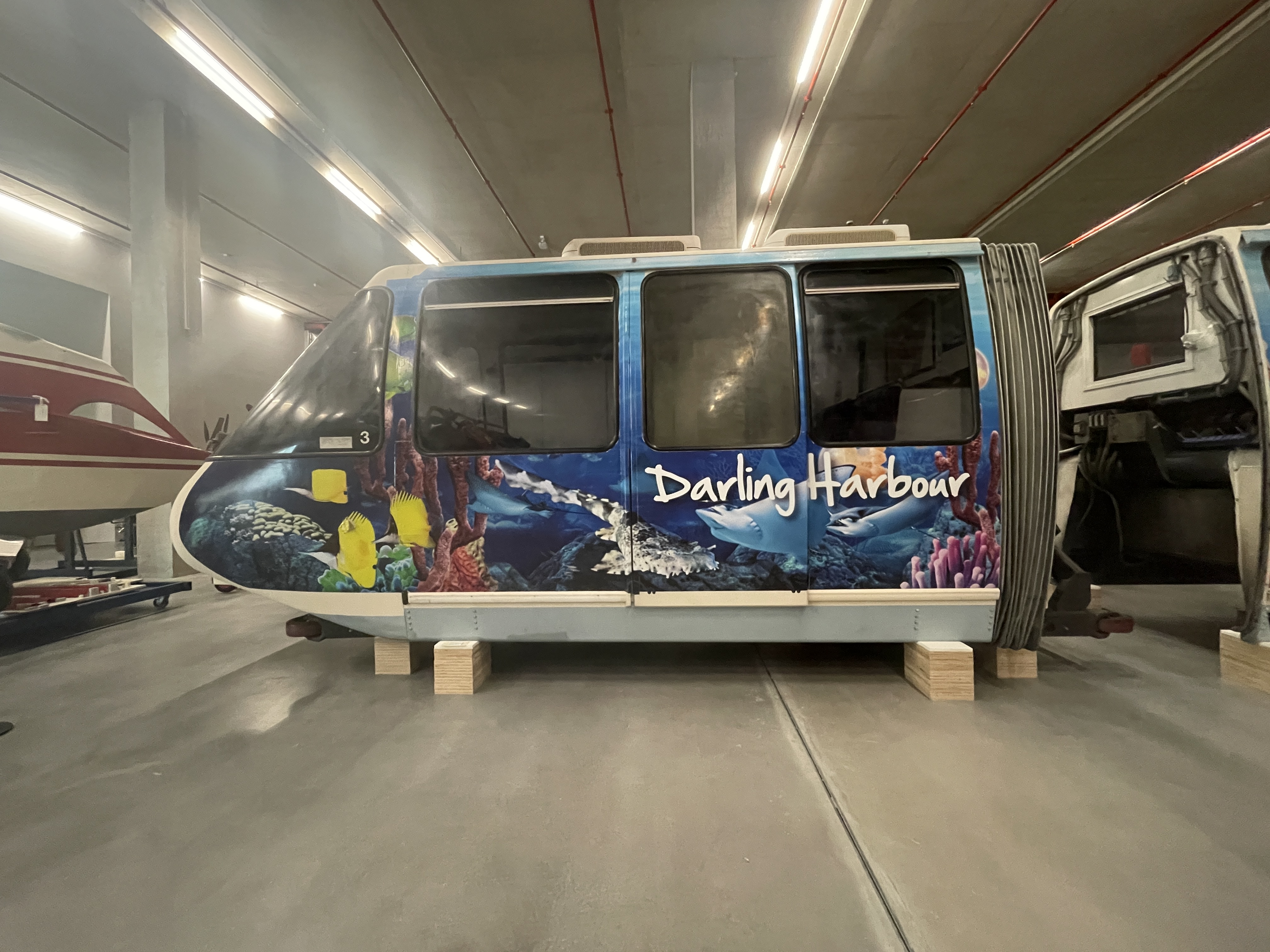
On display at the Powerhouse Museum in Castle Hill

Eleven carriages from three of the six monorail trains have been preserved and two carriages converted..

Monorail Cars
| Set # | Cars preserved | Organisation | Location | Status | Ref |
|---|---|---|---|---|---|
| 2 | 1+3 | National Transport Museum | Inverell | static display |
| 3 | 1+2 | Powerhouse Museum | Castle Hill | stored |
| 3 | 6+7 | Google | Pyrmont | office meeting room |
| 4 | Full set | Sydney Electric Train Society | Sydney | future powered display |

== In popular culture ==
The Monorail system was used for scenes in The Saint: Fear in Fun Park and Mighty Morphin Power Rangers: The Movie, where one train set had "Angel Grove" painted on it. It was also briefly featured in the 1995 Australian film Napoleon and the 1999 Australian cult film Two Hands.

The monorail is featured in the songs "Riding My Train" from the Muppets video Muppets on Wheels and Jaane Kyon from the 2001 Bollywood movie Dil Chahta Hai.

Clive James, in his 1991 Postcard from Sydney television special said, "Feted to break even the day hell freezes over, the monorail runs from the middle of downtown Sydney, to the middle of downtown Sydney, after circumnavigating the middle of downtown Sydney".
