= Metro Transport Sydney =

Former operator of Sydney Light Rail and Sydney Monorail

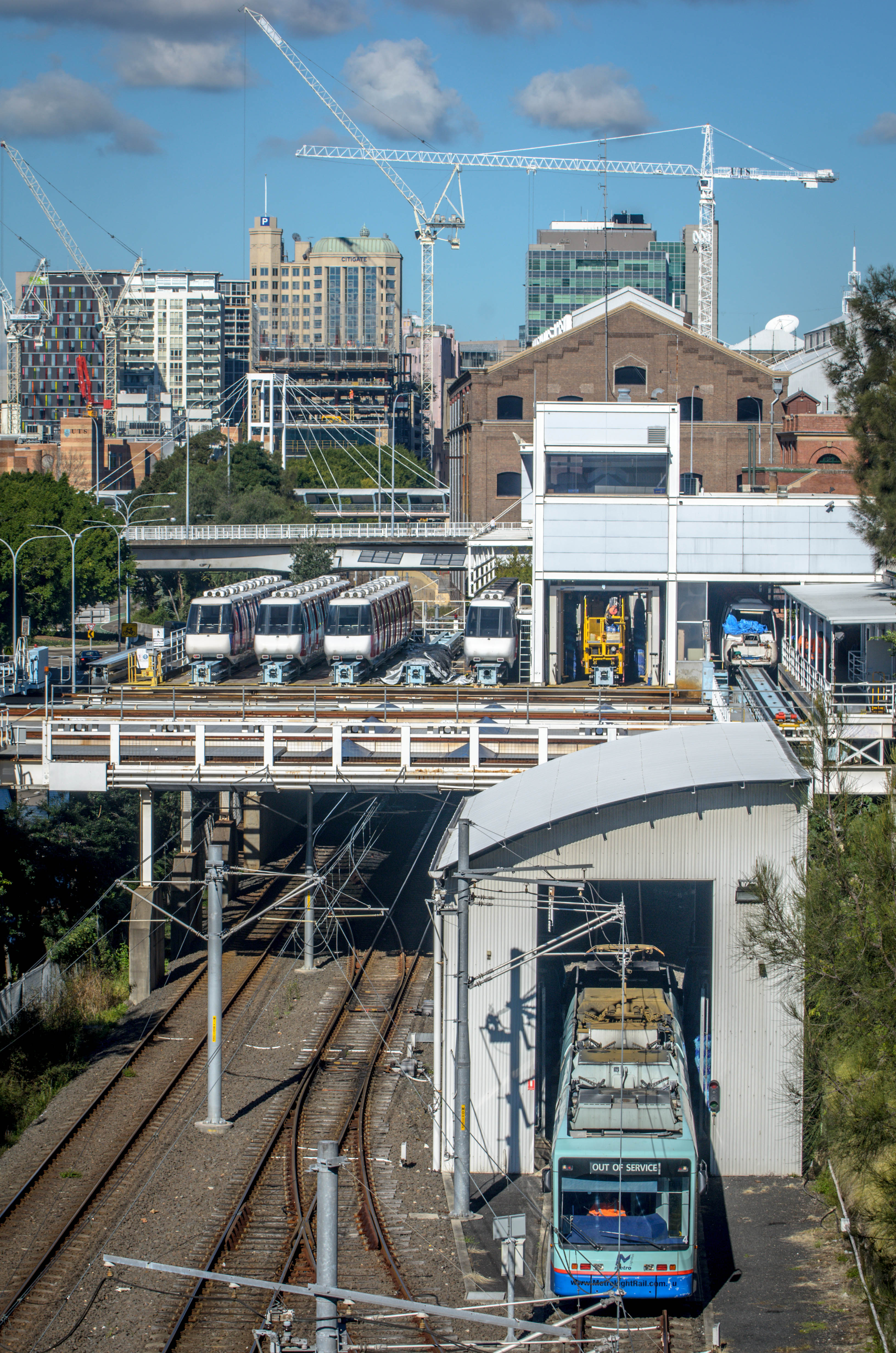
- The Inner West Light Rail passing below the depot of the now-closed Sydney Monorail (both owned by Metro until 2013)
- Industry: Transport
- Predecessor: Sydney Light Rail Company; CGEA Transport Sydney; TNT Transit Systems
- Founded: 1994 (Sydney Light Rail Company); 1998 (CGEA Transport Sydney); 2001 (Metro Transport Sydney)
- Defunct: July 2013
- Headquarters: Sydney, Australia
- Products: Public transport
- Owner: Australia Infrastructure Fund; Utilities Trust of Australia; Colonial First State
- Divisions: Sydney Monorail; Metro Light Rail
- Website: www.metrotransport.com.au/index.php/

Metro Transport Sydney (MTS) was the owner of the now-demolished Sydney Monorail and the former owner of the Inner West Light Rail in Sydney, New South Wales. Established in 2001, it replaced the Sydney Light Rail Company (SLRC), the previous owner of the light rail, and CGEA Transport Sydney, the previous owner of the monorail. It was bought by the New South Wales Government in 2012. The Metro Transport Sydney brand was discontinued from 1 July 2013, and the SLRC and Metro Transport Sydney were deregistered later that month.

Metro Transport Sydney contracted the day-to-day operations of the monorail and light rail to Veolia Transport Sydney, a subsidiary of Veolia Transdev, who operated them since 1998. After the government takeover of Metro Transport Sydney, Veolia Transport Sydney remained as the operator of monorail and light rail. Veolia Transport Sydney later renamed to Transdev Sydney on 1 July 2013. The monorail was also shut down on the same day.

== Assets ==
Until the government takeover in 2012, Metro Transport Sydney owned:

- Sydney Monorail, originally known as Metro Monorail in early MTS years, closed on 30 June 2013.
- Metro Light Rail, the light rail line now known as the Inner West Light Rail.

Metro Light Rail logo

Both Metro Monorail and Metro Light Rail had similar logos to Metro Transport Sydney, with all of them bearing the letter "M", but with the right leg of the letter containing a different word (either "Transport", "Light Rail" or "Monorail"). After the Metro Monorail was rebranded Sydney Monorail, the "M" logo was replaced with a logo of a monorail vehicle.

Metro Transport Sydney advocated for a light rail extension to Circular Quay between the late 1990s and the late 2000s, but did not gain state government support. After a change of state government in the 2011 state election, this extension has been built as part of the separate CBD and South East Light Rail, with the CBD section to Circular Quay completed in December 2019.

== History ==
=== Sydney Light Rail Company ===
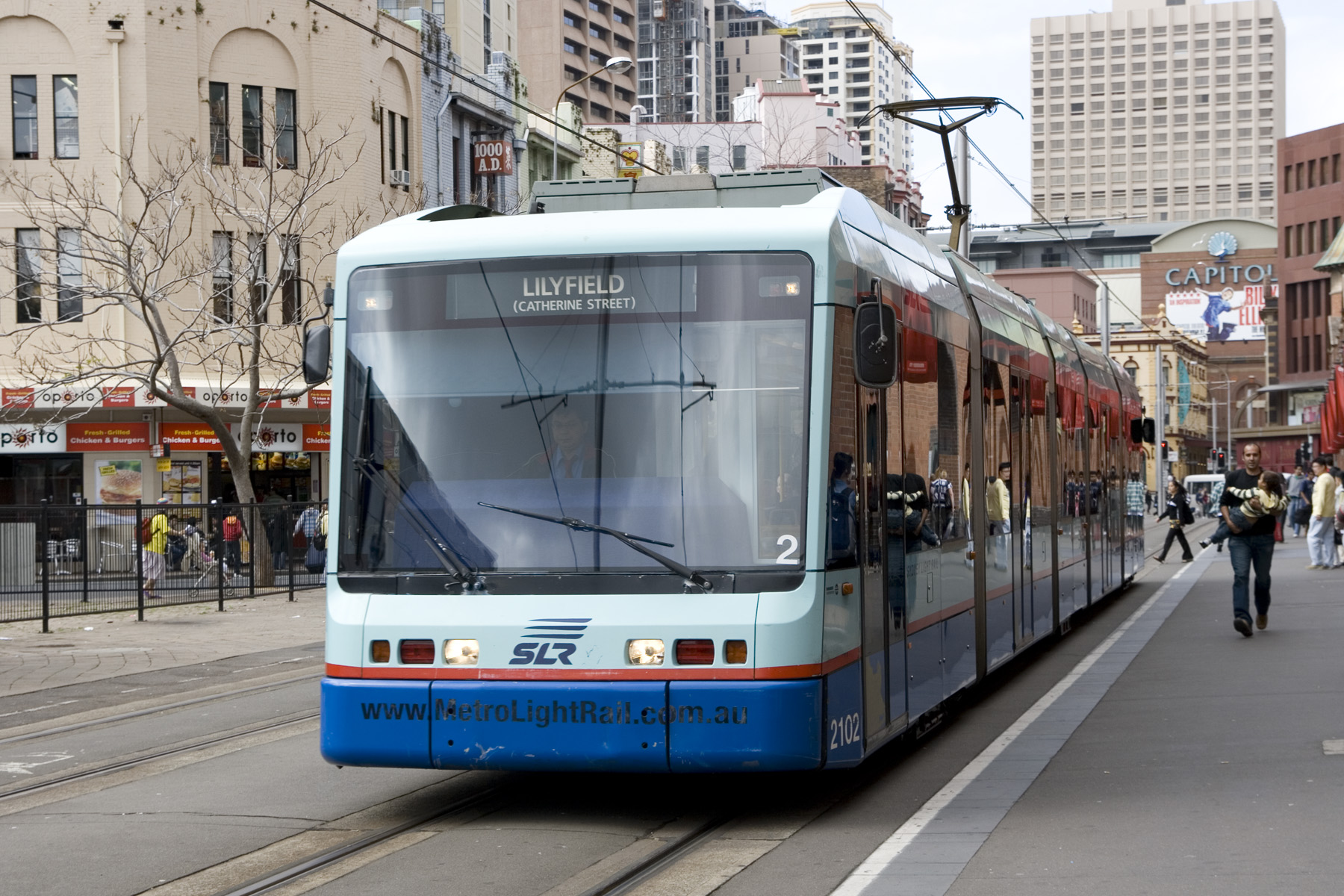
An Adtranz Variotram in SLR livery

In March 1994, the Sydney Light Rail Company (SLRC) was formed. It was owned by Australian Infrastructure Fund (39%), Utilities Trust of Australia (39%) and Legal & General (22%) and was awarded a 30-year concession to operate the Sydney Light Rail (SLR) system until February 2028 when ownership would pass to the State Government. The contract gave the company significant control over the commercial arrangements relating to future extensions or interconnecting lines. SLRC contracted operation of the line to TNT Transit Systems. Another TNT subsidiary, TNT Harbourlink, owned the nearby Sydney Monorail.

=== Acquisition of the monorail ===
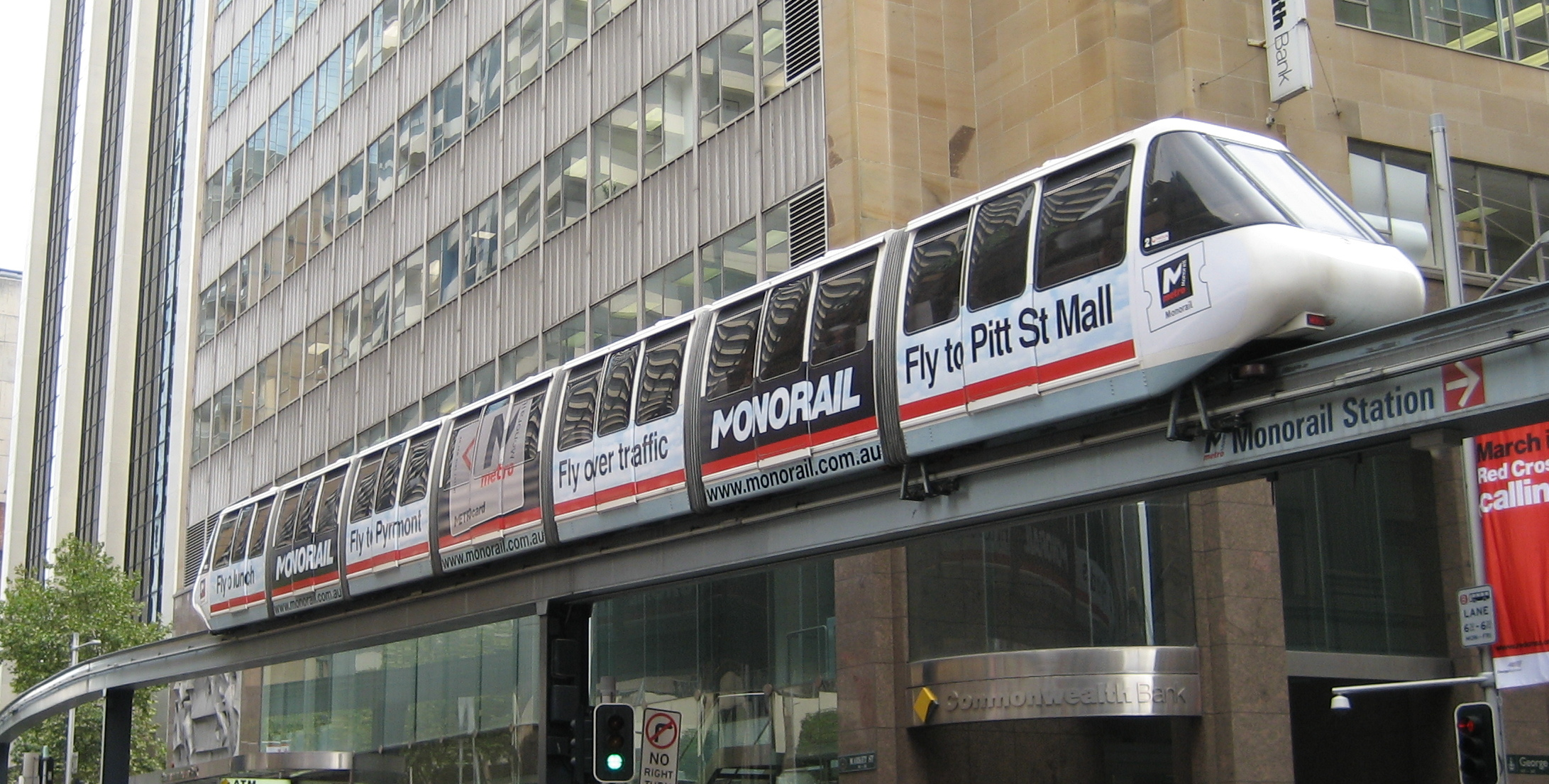
A Von Roll Mark 3 monorail train travelling along Market Street, 2007

After TNT was purchased by Dutch postal company PostNL in January 1997 and merged to form TNT Post Group in 1998, TNT decided to dispose of its businesses not centred on mail and logistics services, including the Sydney monorail. SLRC formed a joint venture with CGEA Transport named CGEA Transport Sydney to purchase TNT Transit Systems and TNT Harbourlink on 10 August 1998. The share composition of the joint venture were CGEA Transport (51%) and SLRC (49%, with 19% Australian Infrastructure Fund, 19% Utilities Trust of Australia and 11% Legal & General). This purchase resulted in:

- CGEA Transport taking control of the operation of the monorail as the new owner of the monorail
- CGEA Transport being awarded the light rail operation contract by the SLRC as the owner of the incumbent operator TNT Transit Systems. SLRC remains the owner of the light rail.

As a result, the operations of both the light rail and the monorail came under the same company (CGEA).

In early 2001, Connex (renamed from CGEA Transport in 1999) sold its share of the monorail to the constituents of SLRC, bringing the monorail and light rail under the common ownership of Australian Infrastructure Fund, Utilities Trust of Australia and Legal & General. Due to SLRC and CGEA Transport Sydney having the same shareholders, they were subsequently combined to form Metro Transport Sydney. It continued to contract day-to-day operations of the monorail and light rail to Connex, rebranded Veolia Transport Sydney in 2006.

By 2004, Metro Transport Sydney was owned by three companies: Australia Infrastructure Fund, Utilities Trust of Australia and Colonial First State.

=== Government ownership ===
Transport for NSW, the transport agency of the Government of New South Wales, established the MTS Holding Company on 12 March 2012. It purchased Metro Transport Sydney and its subsidiaries on 23 March 2012 for $19.8 million, which brought the company under the control of Transport for NSW and the government. The purchase removed the contractual restrictions on expanding the light rail network and allowed the government to dismantle the monorail, assisting its plans to redevelop the Sydney Convention and Exhibition Centre. The monorail was shut down on 30 June 2013.

=== Cessation of the Metro Transport brand ===
The day after the monorail was shut down, on 1 July 2013, the Metro Transport Sydney brand, along with its subsidiary Metro Light Rail, was phased out as part of a broader rebranding and reorganisation of public transport services in New South Wales. The light rail was also placed under direct control of the government. Both SLRC and Metro Transport Sydney Pty Ltd were deregistered on 17 July 2013.

The process of shutting down Metro Transport Sydney and transferring assets to Transport for NSW was completed in September 2014 with the deregistration of MTS Holding Company.
