= Metro Light Rail =

Metro Light Rail may refer to:

- Valley Metro Rail, the light rail network in Phoenix, Arizona
- Metro Light Rail, a former name for the Inner West Light Rail in Sydney
- Dubai Metro previously known as the Dubai Light Rail Transport DLRT
- METRORail, a light rail line in Houston, Texas
