= Cuiabá Light Rail =

Abandoned light rail project in Cuiabá, Brazil

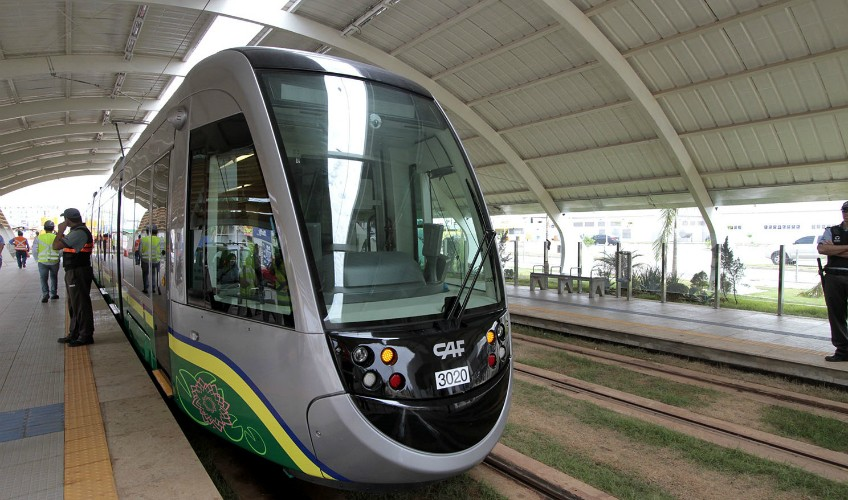

Overview
- Native name: VLT de Cuiabá
- Locale: Cuiabá, Mato Grosso, Brazil
- Transit type: Light rail
- Number of lines: 0 (2 planned)
- Number of stations: 0 (33 planned)
- Daily ridership: 120,000 (projected)

Technical
- System length: 0 (22 km (14 mi) planned)

The Cuiabá Light Rail (Portuguese: VLT de Cuiabá) is an abandoned light rail in the Brazilian city of Cuiabá, Mato Grosso. Work on the line was suspened in 2015 due to suspicion of bidder fraud. The project was officially canceled in 2020. As of 2021, there is no intention to finish the construction and the system is to be replaced by BRT.

The light rail system was designed to connect Cuiabá with Cuiabá International Airport in the city of Várzea Grande.

In 2012, 40 CAF Urbos 3 trams were ordered for operation on the system. All 40 trams had been delivered by the time the project was cancelled, and the fleet was initially mothballed. In August 2024, however, the state of Bahia signed an agreement for the purchase of all 40 vehicles for use on the under-construction Salvador light rail system. As of October 2025, the fleet is currently undergoing refurbishment and modernization works at the CAF factory in Hortolândia.

== Planned system ==
The light rail network was planned to be 22 kilometres (14 mi) in length, operating on two lines:

Line	Termini	Length (km)	Stations
1	Airport ↔ Centro Político Administrativo (CPA)	15	22
2	Centro ↔ Coxipó	7.2	11
