= CAF Urbos =

Family of trams and light rail vehicles

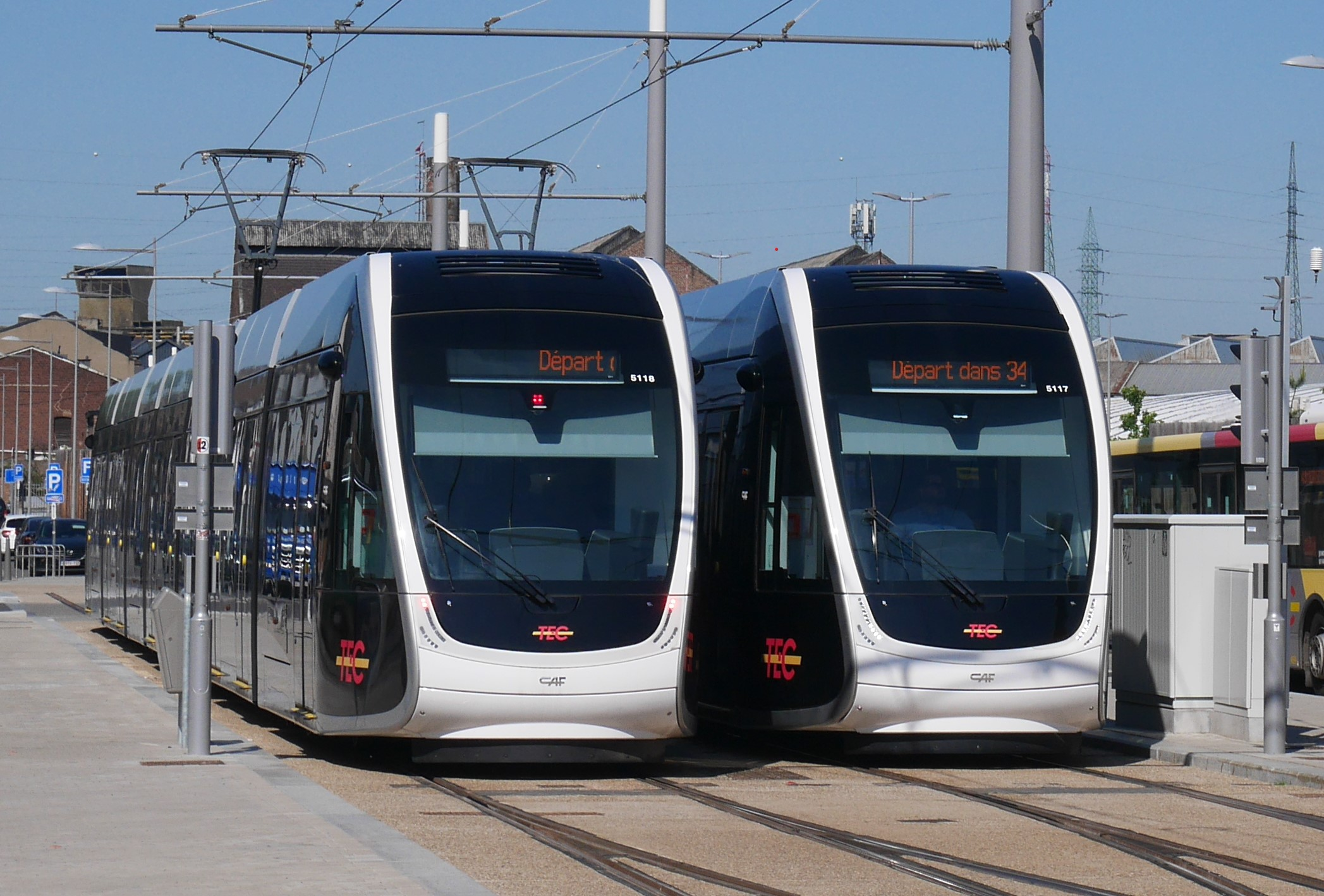
- Two Urbos 3 trams in Liège.

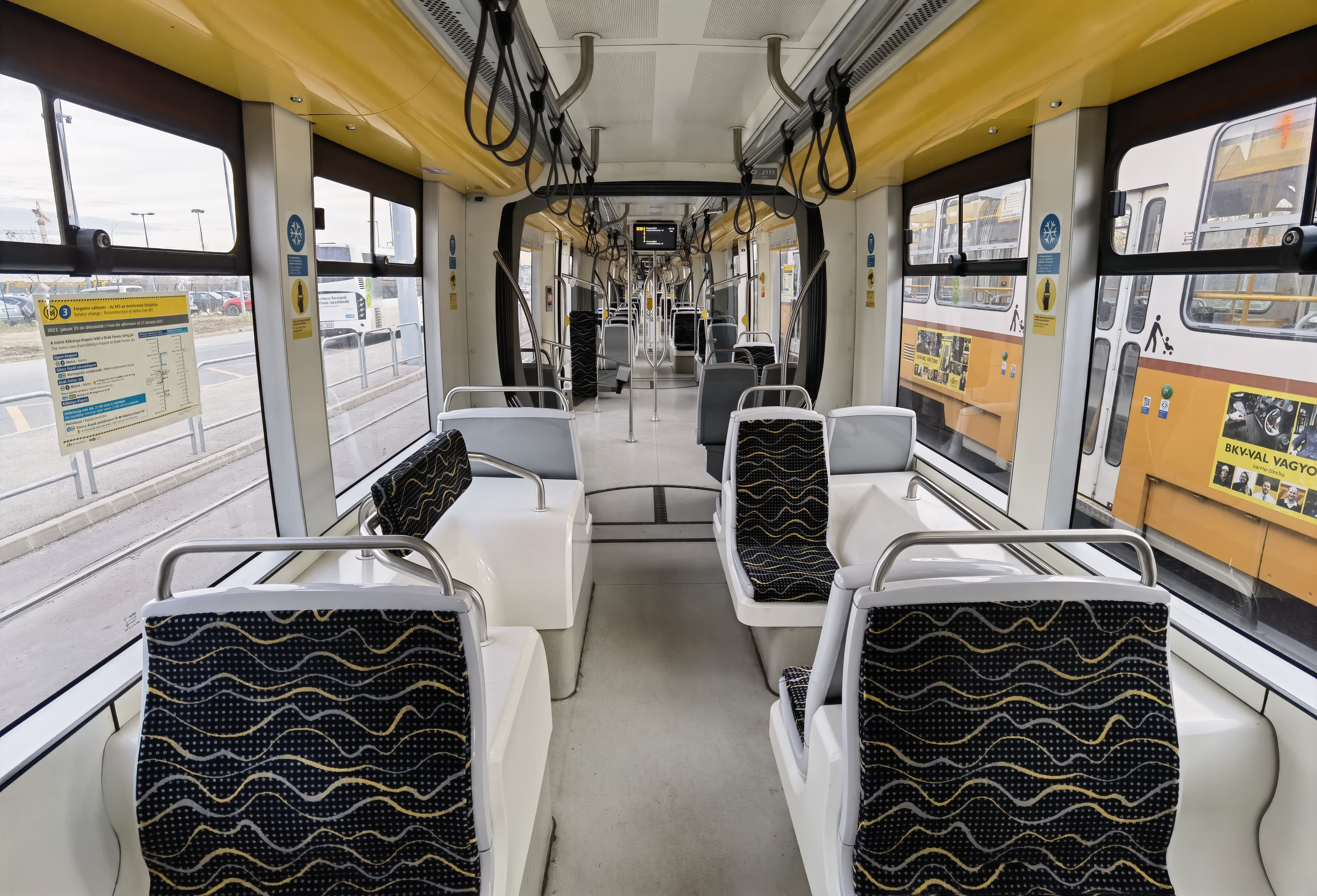
- The interior of an Urbos 3 in Budapest.
- Stock type: Tram/streetcar/light rail vehicle (LRV)
- Manufacturer: Construcciones y Auxiliar de Ferrocarriles (CAF)
- Constructed: 2002–present
- Capacity: 129-327 seated and standing total, depending on tram length

Specifications
- Train length: 18–56 m (59 ft 1 in – 183 ft 9 in)
- Width: 2,300–2,650 mm (7 ft 6 9/16 in – 8 ft 8 5/16 in)
- Floor height: 356 mm (14 in)
- Low-floor: 70–100%
- Doors: 8–20, depending on tram length
- Articulated sections: 2–9
- Maximum speed: 70–80 kilometres per hour (43–50 mph)
- Weight: 34,860 kg (76,850 lb) (3-car tram)
- Traction system: IGBT–VVVF
- Electric systems: 600–750 V DC from overhead catenary Internal supercapacitor
- Current collection: Pantograph
- Bogies: fixed
- Minimum turning radius: 18 metres (59 ft 1 in) (3-car tram)
- Track gauge: 1,435 mm (4 ft 8 1/2 in) standard gauge or 1,000 mm (3 ft 3 3/8 in) metre gauge

The CAF Urbos is a family of trams and light rail vehicles built by CAF. As of 2026, over 1,900 Urbos trams operate in over 50 cities worldwide.

The Spanish company, which had built locomotives, passenger cars, and regional and underground trains, began building trams in 1993. After initial sales of a variant of a Siemens design to two systems, CAF decided to design and build the Urbos in 1995.

There are three generations of the CAF Urbos: the Urbos 1, Urbos 2, and Urbos 3. The first generation was ordered by the Bilbao tram operator, which received eight trams between 2002 and 2004. The second generation was sold to other operators in Spain, and the third generation is sold in Spain, elsewhere in Europe, the United States, Australia, and in the UK. Manufacturing locations include Beasain, Zaragoza, and Linares, Spain; Elmira, New York, USA; Hortolandia, Brazil; Newport, UK; Huehuetoca, Mexico; and Bagnères-de-Bigorre, France.

== Urbos 1 ==
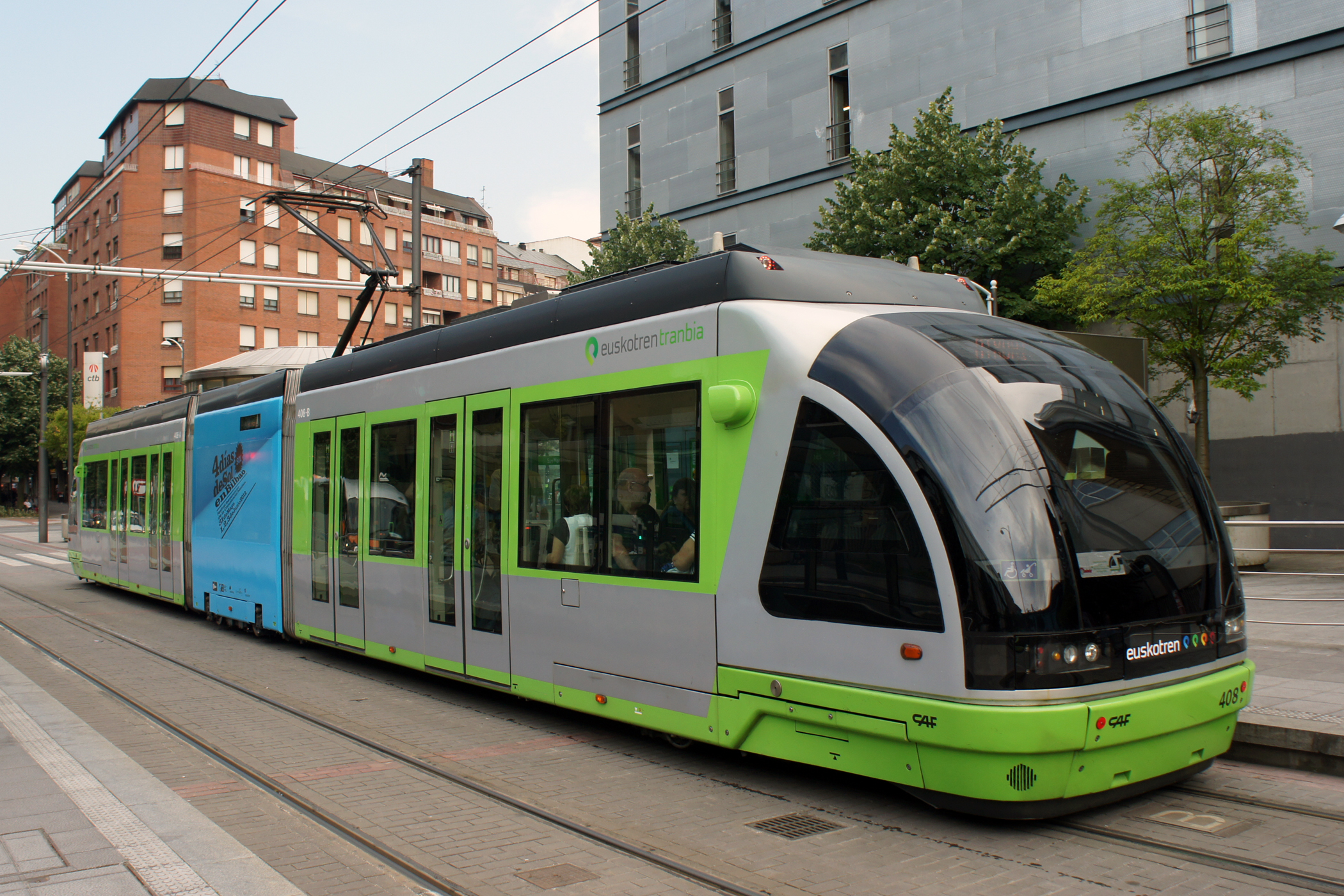
Urbos 1 tram in Bilbao

This series was only sold to Euskotren Tranbia to operate tram services in Bilbao. The original Bilbao tram system was shut down in 1964 and the second generation opened in December 2002 with extensions in 2004.

- Bilbao tram: 8 bidirectional trams, numbered 401–408 and locally designated the Euskotren 400 series. 70% low-floor trams with 3 bogies on 1,000 mm (3 ft 3 3/8 in) metre gauge.

== Urbos 2 ==
=== In operation ===
Location	City/System	Image	Entered service	Gauge	Car body construction	Quantity	Notes
Spain	Bilbao tram and Vitoria-Gasteiz tram		2008	Metre	Aluminium	11	3 units operate in Bilbao, while 8 operate in Vitoria-Gasteiz. Locally designated the Euskotren 500 series.
Spain	Seville Metro - Line 1		2009	Standard	Steel	21	5 units transferred from MetroCentro; 3 units transferred from Sydney
Turkey	AntRay (Antalya)		2009	Standard	Aluminium	14	Standard gauge variation of the Bilbao/Vitoria-Gasteiz version

=== Withdrawn ===
Location	City/System	Image	In service	Quantity	Notes
Spain	Vélez-Málaga Tram		2006–2012	3	Transferred to Sydney in July 2013
Spain	MetroCentro (Seville)		2007–2011	5	4 units transferred to Metro line 1; 1 unit transferred to Sydney
Australia	L1 Dulwich Hill line (Sydney)		Mar–Jul 2014	4	1 unit transferred from Seville; 3 units transferred from Vélez-Màlaga Transferred to Seville Metro line 1

== Urbos 3 ==
The CAF Urbos 3 is the successor of the Urbos 2; all new sales are of Urbos 3. The standard variants, the Urbos 100 and Urbos 70, have either a 100% or 70% low floor design, respectively, and a maximum speed of 80 kilometres per hour (50 mph). The tram type is offered in metre gauge and standard gauge and allows for a tram width of 2,300, 2,400 or 2,650 mm (7 ft 6 9/16 in, 7 ft 10 1/2 in or 8 ft 8 5/16 in). Trams can be assembled from 3, 5, 7 or (only for the Urbos 100) 9 modules, with the length ranging between 23 and 56 metres (75 and 184 ft).

CAF has developed an option to build 'Greentech Freedrive' lithium-ion supercapacitors and batteries into the Urbos 3, allowing brief operation without an external electrical supply. This ACR system (Acumulador de Carga Rápida) allowed the tramway operator in Seville to remove the overhead wires in key locations during Holy Week 2011. It has also been used in Luxembourg, Granada, Zaragoza and the West Midlands.

In 2024, a CAF Urbos fleet of 40 light rail trains were transported from Cuiabá, Mato Grosso, in Brazil to Salvador, Bahia, following a deal to build the new Salvador LRT system (three lines, under construction), to replace an old suburban train and a failed Chinese BYD Skyrail project bid. The deal followed a lawsuit agreement between the Brazilian state governments (Bahia and Mato Grosso) because the delays for the construction of the Cuiabá Light Rail were so significant that it was replaced by a BRT system in Cuiabá.

=== Urbos 100 / 100X ===
Country	City/System	Image	Quantity	Order value	Notes
Europe
Belgium	Antwerp		58		
Belgium	Coast Tram		48		Delivered 2020–2021 Name: Zeelijner
Belgium	Ghent		18		
Belgium	Liège		20	€360 million	
France	Besançon		19	€34.4 million	
France	Grenoble		38		Option for 9 more trams possible. To be operational by 2028.
France	Marseille		15	€57 million	First tram delivered in 2025, in service since January 2026.
France	Montpellier		60	€200 million	Option for 17 more trams possible. In service since 2025.
France	Nantes		8	€22 million	Option for 4 more trams for €10 million
France	Saint-Étienne		16		In service since May 2017.
France	Tours		19	N/A	To be operational by 2028
Germany	Freiburg im Breisgau		25		
Hungary	Budapest		124 (37+56+31)	€90 million	
Hungary	Debrecen		18		
Italy	Bologna		35	€130 million	Option for 25 more trams possible.
Italy	Cagliari		3	€7.7 million	In service since 2018
Italy	Palermo		23		Option for 35 more trams possible.
Italy	Rome		80	€457 million	Total order possibilites up to 121 trams.
Luxembourg	Luxembourg		21	€83.0 million	In service since 2017
Netherlands	Amsterdam		72		Initial order was 63 in 2016. In operation since January 2021.
Netherlands	Utrecht		27		
Netherlands	Utrecht		27		
Norway	Oslo		87	kr 4.2 billion	Locally designated as SL18. First two were delivered in 2020. In operation from January 2022, with trial period of 5 months. Option for 60 more.
Portugal	Lisbon		15	€43 million	Delivery began in April 2023 and will be complete during 2024.
Serbia	Belgrade		30	€70 million	
Spain	Granada		13	€43.9 million	Option for 4 more trams
Spain	Málaga		14		
Spain	Seville		5		MetroCentro line, 1 reserved
Spain	Vitoria-Gasteiz		7		Locally designated the Euskotren 600 series.
Spain	Vitoria-Gasteiz		3+9		
Spain	Zaragoza		21		
Spain	Zaragoza		2		
Sweden	Lund		7	297 million SEK	In service since December 2020.
United Kingdom	West Midlands (Birmingham)		42	£40 million	
United Kingdom	Edinburgh		27		
North America
Canada	Calgary		28		For use on the Green Line LRT. To be delivered in 2027. Option for 24 additional LRVs possible.
United States	Cincinnati		5	$25 million	
United States	Kansas City		14		
United States	Omaha		6	$54 million	For use on the Omaha Streetcar. Option for a further 29 trams. To be operational by 2027.
United States	Portland		15		Equipped with batteries for catenary-free operation.
United States	Seattle		10	$50 million	Order was canceled in 2019 amid escalating cost projections for the planned new line for which they were intended.
South America
Brazil	Salvador		40		Originally built for the Cuiabá Light Rail (also in Brazil); later sold to Salvador. In service since June 2026.
Asia
Taiwan	Kaohsiung		9		ACR system built in; no need for catenary
Taiwan	New Taipei City		23	€200 million	
Middle East
Israel	Jerusalem		114		Urbos 100. For Red Line extension and Green Line. Operational on the Red Line since 2025
Israel	Tel Aviv		98		For Purple Line. To be operational 2027
Oceania
Australia	Canberra		14	A$65 million	5-module 100. Delivered 2018, operational April 2019
Australia	Canberra		5		Equipped with batteries for catenary-free operation
Australia	Newcastle		6		5-module 100 supercapacitor wire free. Delivered 2018–19
Australia	Sydney		16	A$20 million (1st order)	5-module 100. Initial order for 6 trams; subsequently increased to 12. Four more trams for the line were ordered from CAF in June 2021, they entered service in 2023. Operates on the Inner West Light Rail.
Australia	Sydney		13		7-module 100 battery wire free, operating on Stage 1 of the Parramatta Light Rail since December 2024
Africa
Mauritius	Port Louis		18	€100 million	In service since October 2019

==== Design flaws ====
In December 2017, the Besançon Tramway in Besançon, France, discovered cracks in their Urbos 3s vehicles around the bogie box area of the bodies, which in December 2020 CAF paid for remedial work to be performed with each unit affected requiring one month downtime for the work to be completed.

On 11 June 2021, the West Midlands Metro (operating between Birmingham and Wolverhampton, England) were forced to suspend their services due to similar cracks being discovered in the bogie box areas of their Urbos 3s vehicles, with ongoing investigations continuing to identify any other issues relating to the cracks and to find options for remedial works to be performed.

Following on from these instances, in November 2021 the New South Wales transport minister Rob Stokes announced that the Sydney L1 Dulwich Hill line would be decommissioned for up to 18 months, due to serious design flaws in all 12 of the CAF Urbos 3s tram sets that were running on the line. Stokes stated that the flaws (in the bogie boxes) were likely to be far broader in scope than those identified in Sydney due to the thousands of the same tram type operated around the world.

Similar issues relating to cracks in the bogie box area were discovered in the Urbos 3 vehicles supplied to the Belgrade tramway network.

The discovery of further cracks in the West Midlands trams led to service being suspended again from 12 November 2021 to December 2021.

Following vehicle inspections, services in the West Midlands were again suspended on 20 March 2022 until further notice due to cracks described by the operator as 'bodywork cracks'. Midland Metro was working directly with the manufacturer to assess the safety and operational impact.

=== Urbos AXL ===
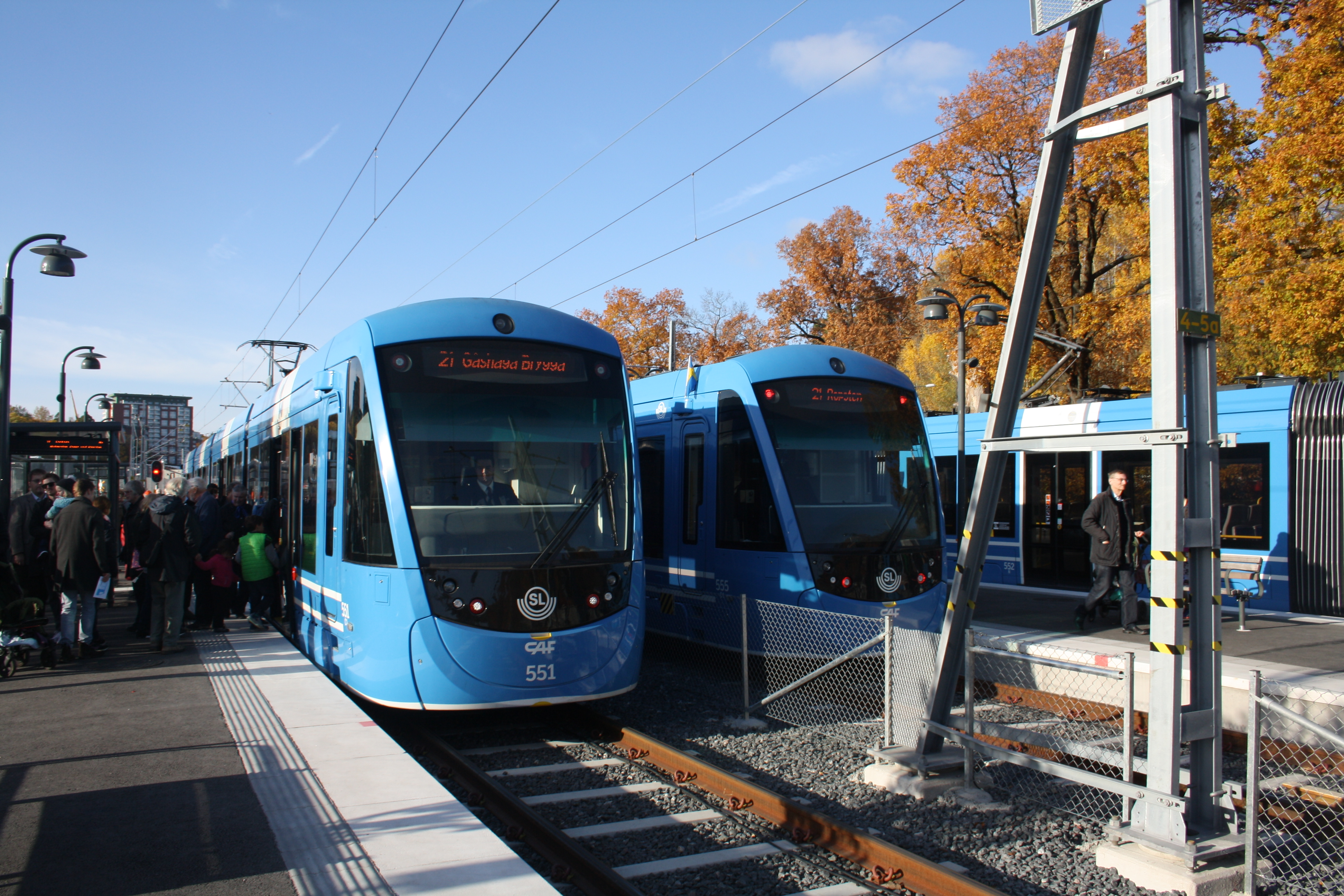
Urbos AXL in Stockholm

Vehicles in the Urbos AXL series have longer car-body sections and pivoting bogies. With a maximum speed of 90 kilometres per hour (56 mph), it is designed for high-capacity, mass rapid transit systems. This type of tram is currently in use only in two Northern European countries:

- Tallinn, Estonia, (20 trams)
- Stockholm, Sweden (51 trams) (42 3-segment and 9 4-segment)

=== Urbos TT ===
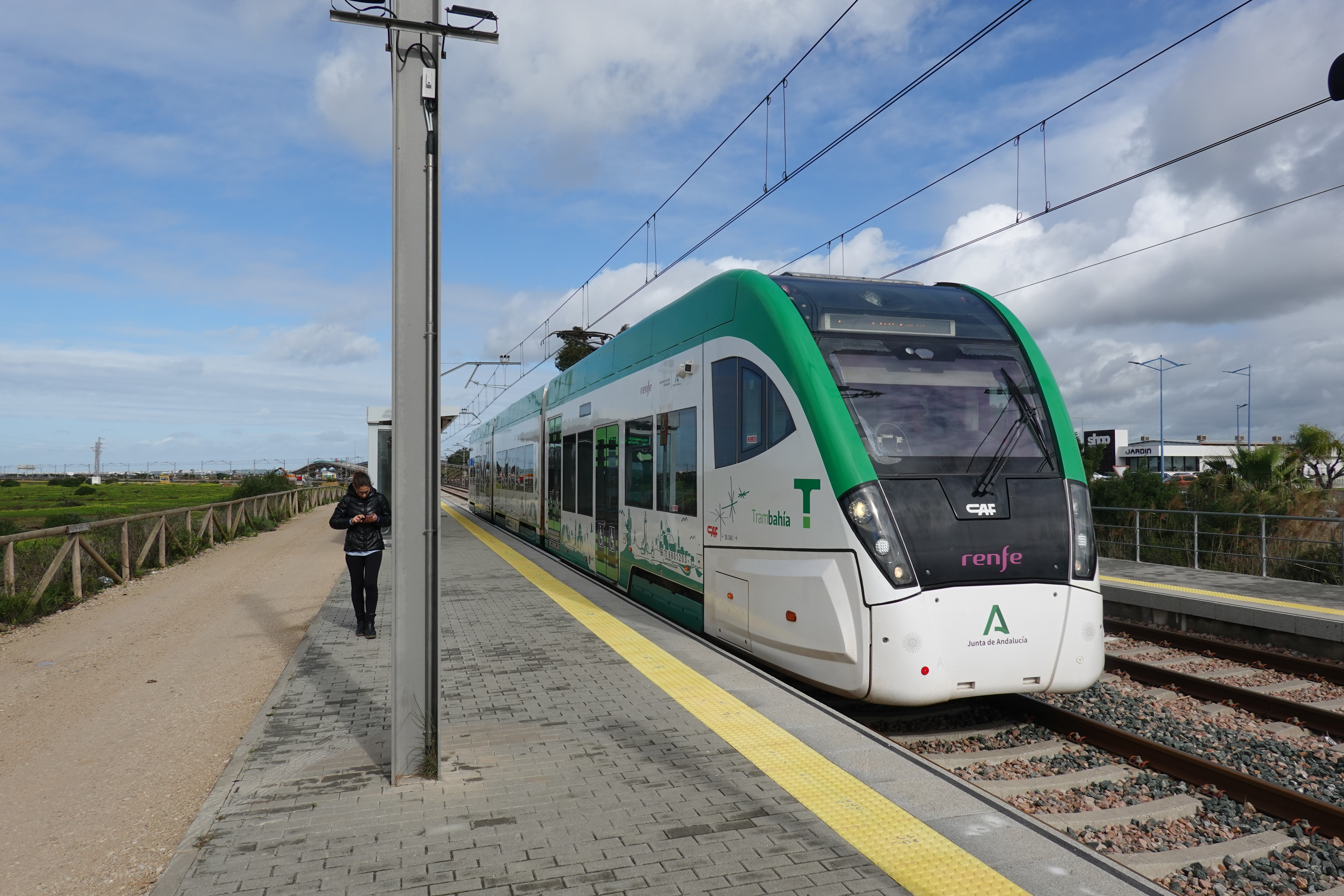
Urbos TT in Cádiz.

The Urbos TT series is built with tram-train technology, connecting existing heavy rail infrastructure directly to urban tramway systems.

- Cádiz, Spain (7 vehicles)

=== Urbos 70 ===
Urbos 70 in Maryland

Originally called the Urbos LRV, the Urbos 70 is designed for the North American market and is customizable.

- Houston, Texas, USA (39 vehicles)
- Maryland/Washington, D.C., USA (28 vehicles) Scheduled to be in service in late 2027.

=== LRTA 13000 class (Metro edition) ===
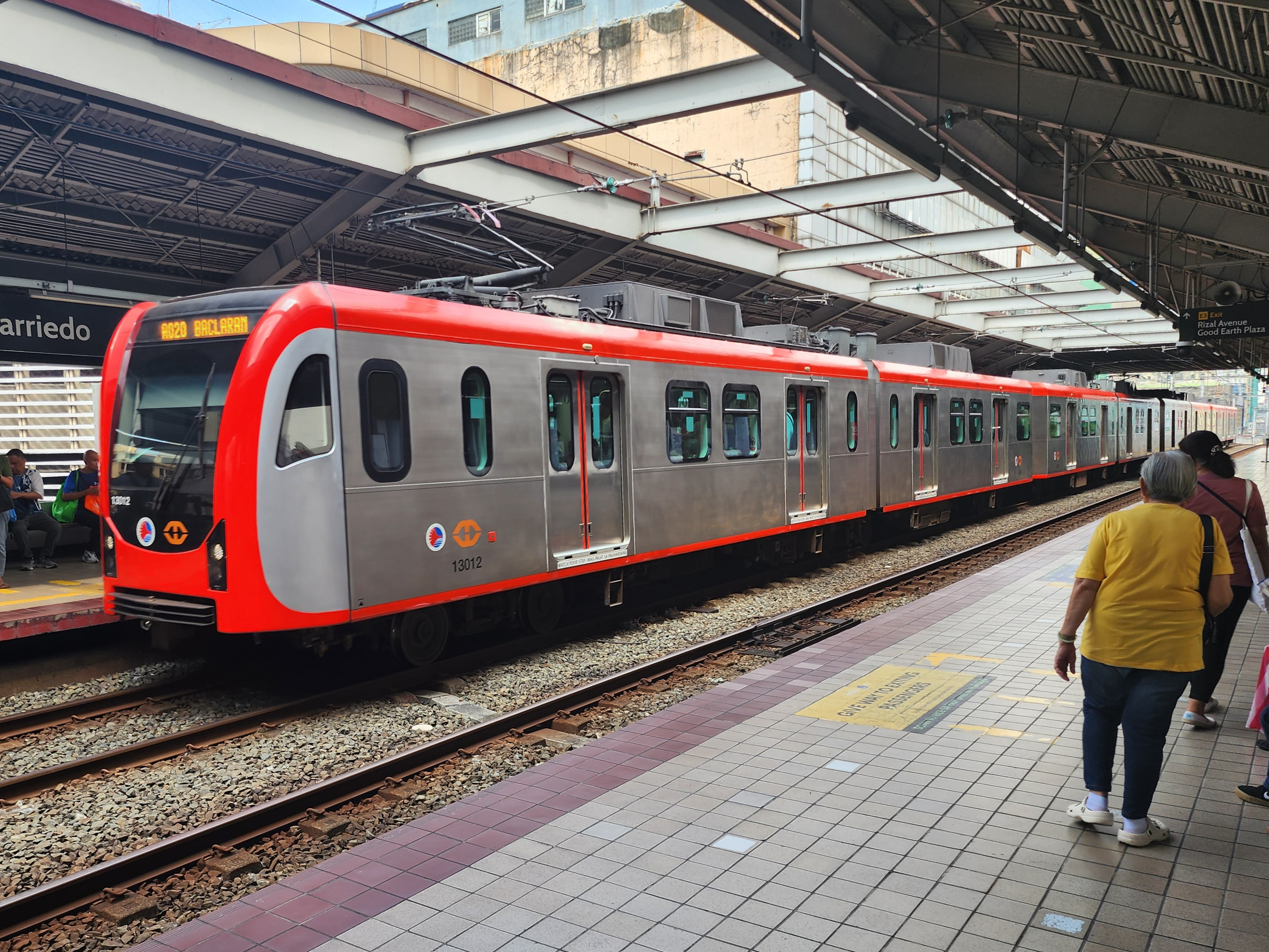
13000 class in Santa Cruz, Manila

The LRTA 13000 class is a high-floor light rail vehicle variant of the Urbos. 120 units were ordered for the LRT Line 1 medium-capacity rail system in Metro Manila, Philippines. It was designed by CAF along with Mitsubishi Corporation and built at CAF's facilities in Corella, Spain, and Huehuetoca, Mexico. The trains were progressively delivered from 2021 onwards, entering service by 20 July 2023. It replaced the aging, forty-year-old LRTA 1000 class LRVs.
