= Salvador LRT =

Salvador and Metropolitan Region Light Rail Transit
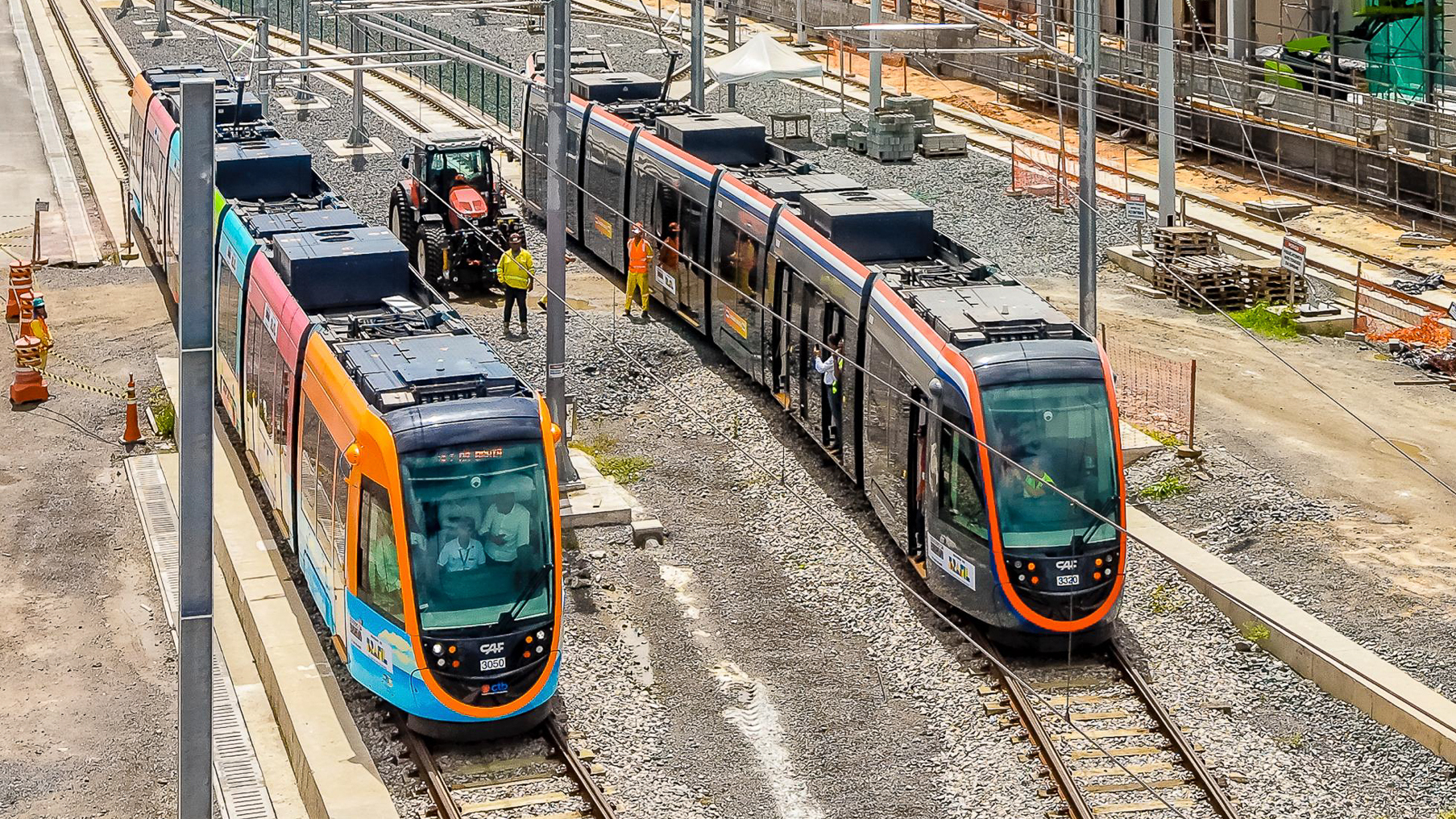

Overview
- Status: Under construction
- Owner: Government of the State of Bahia
- Locale: Metropolitan Region of Salvador, BA, Brazil
- Termini: Calçada (Calçada Station); Ilha de São João, with branches to Águas Claras and Piatã
- Stations: 34 (planned)

Service
- Type: Light rail transit (LRT)
- System: Salvador and Metropolitan Region LRT
- Operator: To be determined
- Rolling stock: CAF Urbos
- Daily ridership: 100,000 (projected)

History
- Opened: Projected for 2027

Technical
- Line length: 36.4 km (22.6 mi)
- Character: Surface and elevated sections
- Track gauge: 1,435 mm (4 ft 8 1/2 in) standard gauge
- Electrification: Catenary, 750 V DC
- Operating speed: Average: 25 km/h (16 mph), Max: 80 km/h (50 mph)

The Salvador LRT (Portuguese: VLT de Salvador), also known as Salvador and Metropolitan Region LRT or Suburban LRT, is a Brazilian light rail transit system that is currently under construction in Salvador and Simões Filho, municipalities in the Metropolitan Region of Salvador, Bahia.

The light rail system was conceived to replace and expand the old Suburban Train of Salvador, or "Suburban Train." Initially proposed in 2015 and bid in 2017 without participants, a public–private partnership was signed in 2019 with BYD under the consortium Skyrail Bahia for an elevated monorail system of 36.4 kilometres (22.6 miles), comprising three sections and 34 stops. The system is expected to be fully integrated with Salvador Metro system, transforming Bahia capital city mass transport.

Construction on the monorail "began" in February 2021 with an anticipated completion in 2027. The old train system was dismantled, but the contract with Skyrail Bahia was canceled in 2023 due to project delays and irregularities. Following the cancellation, a new tender for a light rail project was issued at the end of 2023, new contracts were signed, and construction resumed in 2024, with an anticipated completion date of 2027 or 2028. The line started limited operation on June 29, 2026 running over a four-kilometre section between the stops São Joaquim and Marisqueiras.

== History ==
=== Background and the former Suburban Train ===
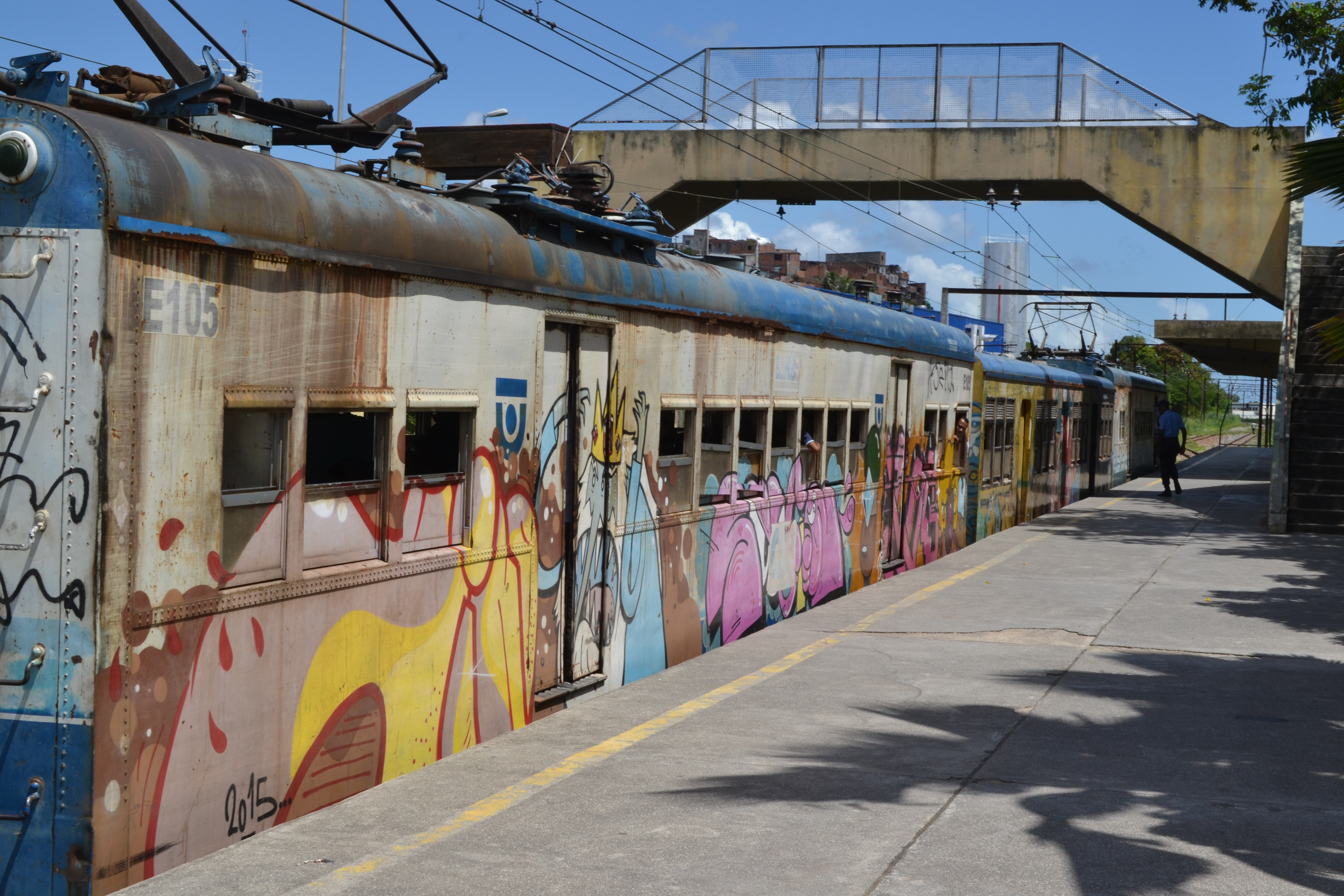
Suburban train of Salvador (old train of the Suburban Train system)

Originating in the 1940s, the Suburban Train of Salvador saw occasional modernization investments by the federal government, but lack of funding for ongoing maintenance eventually left the transport system in poor condition. Beginning in the early 2000s, the federal government and Salvador’s city government discussed the modernization and transfer of its administration from CBTU to the city. Initiated in 2000 with the creation of the municipal public company Companhia de Transporte de Salvador (CTS), the process concluded in 2005 with a substantial upgrade to trains and stations. At the same time, a proposal to replace the old suburban train with light rail was raised.

=== The first LRT proposal ===
CTS began developing the LRT project, which was transferred to Bahia’s state government in 2013. Renamed Companhia de Transportes do Estado da Bahia (CTB), the project gained momentum. In 2015, an 18.5-kilometer line with 21 stops from Comércio to Paripe along Avenida São Luis was presented, projected to carry 150,000 passengers daily at a cost of R$1 billion. Lacking resources to implement the project, the Bahia government restructured it as a public-private partnership (PPP) and issued a bid in 2017, but there were no participants, and the project was shelved.

=== BYD Skyrail Monorail proposal ===
The Chinese company BYD later proposed converting the LRT project into an Alweg-standard monorail, supported by a PPP with Bahia’s state government. A contract was signed in February 2019. Although BYD proposed an elevated monorail, Bahia’s government decided against conducting new studies (including EIA and RIMA), signing the contract based on slightly different studies. The project was termed “light transport vehicle” (VLT) to bypass legal challenges.

"...This can be a ground monorail, a ground light rail, or an elevated monorail. The monorail is a comparable mode, with greater capacity and reach. The bidding fully complied with what was stipulated in the notice."

— Nelson Pelegrino, State Secretary of Urban Development of Bahia

"...They (LRT and Monorail) have different technologies, distinct operations and maintenance, separate suppliers, and differing safety protocols, each with its advantages and disadvantages."

— Peter L. Alouche, engineer from the University of São Paulo, former director of the São Paulo Metro, and mobility expert

"...It does not qualify as LRT because it runs on rubber tires. The government insists on calling it an LRT to avoid admitting that only one Chinese company participated in the bidding, which lacked LRT technology and could only offer an elevated monorail. That's where the problem began. The primary advantage of LRT is that it is a flexible system capable of integrating with regular traffic."

— Carl von Hauenschild, architect and urban planner from Universität Stuttgart, technical coordinator of Participa Salvador, and mobility specialist

In April 2021, BYD announced its first SkyRail for Salvador. This autonomous, futuristic SkyRail would link Salvador’s central business district with Ilha de São João over 14.5 miles (23.26 km). The project was part of BYD's global initiative to offer sustainable transit solutions, such as its proposal for a monorail in Los Angeles.

The monorail, priced at $750 million and developed over five years, included 28 train units. However, significant difficulties arose: delays in licensing processes added 12 months, environmental permits raised costs by R$200 million, and rerouting required by the National Historic and Artistic Heritage Institute (IPHAN) increased costs by R$300 million. This, combined with new phases, escalated costs from R$1.5 billion to R$5.2 billion.

In 2024, the Bahia State Audit Court (TCE-BA) deemed the previous LRT contract illegal and forwarded findings to the Bahia State Public Prosecutor's Office (MP-BA) and the Bahia State Legislative Assembly (ALBA). The government rescinded the contract with Skyrail in August 2023.

=== New bid and expanded LRT ===
Following the cancellation, a new bid for the Salvador LRT was issued in December 2023, with the project divided into three segments and an estimated cost of nearly R$4 billion, projected for completion in 2027. In March 2024, the Bahia State Court of Justice (TJ-BA) suspended the bid due to alleged irregularities.

Timeline of Salvador LRT
Year	Event
2017	Initial LRT bid issued by Bahia state.
2018	TCE-BA approves suspension of bid.
2019	State government signs contract with Skyrail for monorail.
2021	Construction begins.
2023	Contract with Skyrail canceled.
2024	TJ-BA suspends new bid due to irregularities; Eggis contracted for project management.

== System specifications ==
The Salvador Metropolitan LRT, also known as the Suburban LRT, is designed to replace the Suburban Train of Salvador, creating a modern 36.4-kilometer (km) system with 34 stations. This electric-powered, eco-friendly transit system is expected to serve around 100,000 daily passengers. The total investment across the three segments exceeds R$5 billion, marking a major public infrastructure effort aimed at enhancing urban mobility in the region.

=== Stations and lines ===
The project includes three main lines:

- First Line: Ilha de São João ⇔ Calçada — Covers 16.66 km with 18 stations. Starting from Ilha de São João in Simões Filho and ending at Calçada in Salvador, this line serves as a crucial link for suburban commuters.

- Second Line: São Luiz ⇔ Águas Claras — Spanning 9.2 km, this line includes 8 stations, providing connections to areas like Hospital do Subúrbio and Valéria, and terminating at Águas Claras, where it integrates with the Salvador metro system.

- Third Line: Águas Claras ⇔ Piatã — The third segment extends over 10.52 km with 9 stations, connecting key residential and commercial zones in Salvador, including a terminus near the beachfront at Piatã.

In addition to the tracks, significant components including the overhead catenary system, substations, track-switching apparatus, and telecommunications infrastructure have been shipped to Bahia from Mato Grosso and are scheduled for phased delivery through March 2025.

=== Light-rail vehicles ===
On July 9, 2024, the states of Bahia and Mato Grosso finalized an agreement for the transfer of 40 CAF Urbos 3 light-rail vehicles from the cancelled Cuiabá Light Rail project in Mato Grosso. These trains will undergo technical restoration and operational adjustments at CAF’s facility in Hortolândia, São Paulo, to prepare them for the Salvador and Metropolitan Region LRT system. Built in 2014-2015, the low-floor light-rail vehicles have seven sections and are 44 meters long. The process of shipping the refurbished trains to Salvador was expected to begin in the second half of 2025. The vehicles will have a multi-color livery.

This transfer of assets is part of a larger agreement between the two states to optimize public resources. The acquisition from Mato Grosso reportedly resulted in a cost-saving of R$846 million, representing a 15.6% reduction in the total budget of the Salvador LRT project.

=== Economic and social impact ===
The Salvador LRT project is expected to play a transformative role in the region's urban mobility, providing a safe, fast, and comfortable alternative to existing transport methods and stimulating economic development. According to Ana Cláudia Nascimento, president of the Companhia de Transportes do Estado da Bahia (CTB), the LRT represents a historic urban development initiative. "The LRT will be more than just a transit system; it will mark a true urban transformation for Salvador and its Metropolitan Region, enhancing the quality of life for thousands of Bahia residents," she stated.

=== Future extensions ===
The Bahia government is conducting feasibility studies for further extensions to the Salvador LRT, including potential new lines to reach the Comércio area and Itapagipe Peninsula. This expansion aims to bring greater coverage and connectivity across Salvador’s urban and suburban areas, addressing future transit needs and fostering sustainable development.

== See also ==
- Rail transport in Brazil
- Salvador Metro
