= Vélez-Málaga Tram =

- Tranvía de Vélez-Málaga
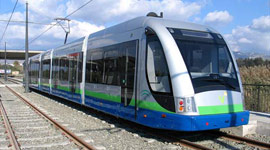
- CAF Urbos 2 in Vélez-Málaga in 2007

Operation
- Locale: Vélez-Málaga, Spain
- Open: 11 October 2006
- Close: 4 June 2012
- Lines: 1

Infrastructure
- Track gauge: 1,435 mm (4 ft 8 1/2 in) standard gauge
- Electrification: 750 V DC overhead catenary

The Vélez-Málaga Tram (Spanish: Tranvía de Vélez-Málaga) was operating between October 2006 and June 2012 connecting the Spanish town Vélez-Málaga with the coastal town Torre del Mar. It is the first modern low-floor tramway system service that has been taken out of service.

== History ==
=== Construction and Operation ===
Construction began in 2003, with strong local opposition, with the service opening on 11 October 2006.

The tram line was not connected through to the city center of Vélez-Málaga – passengers had to switch in the outskirts to a bus line. At the same time, the direct bus service from Torre del Mar to the city center of Vélez-Málaga was kept. As a consequence, the ridership fell from 890,000 passengers in 2007 to 676,000 in 2011.

=== Extension ===
Construction on an extension of 1.2 kilometres (0.75 mi) (from the northern terminus, Parque Jurado Lorca station, to Esplanada de la Estaciónto in the Vélez-Málaga city center) began during 2008, but upon its completion the tram operator took its chance to ask for a higher support from the city treasury for the operational costs of the system. The city officials declined, and so the extension was never put into service.

=== Closure ===
With the elections in 2011 the Partido Popular came into power which chose to decline paying for the costs of the tramway system, due to low ridership on the network.

Closure of the system was achieved on 4 June 2012 with an initially temporary shutdown of the tram line. The line has not operated since June 2012.

=== Potential future reopening ===
There are plans and a €2m budget to reactivate the line, plans to extend the service west along the coast to Rincón de la Victoria where it would connect to the future Line 3 of the Málaga Metro and will follow the route of the old N-340 road. There were also talks of upgrading the line to become a branch of the future line 3 as well as talks of converting the route to BRT. There were also talks of turning part of the street running route in Torrer Del Mar into a heritage tramway, but these plans didn't finalise. As of 2026, the line still remains closed and in disrepair.

== Rolling stock ==
Services on the line were operated by three CAF Urbos 2 trams. These were leased for use on the Inner West Light Rail line in Sydney, Australia entering service in March 2014. Following the introduction of new CAF Urbos 3s, they were withdrawn from service in July 2015 and returned to Spain.

For the reopening of the line in 2017 the Vélez-Málaga town hall considered buying smaller models.
