= Acumulador de Carga Rápida =

Supercapacitor electric tram system from Spain

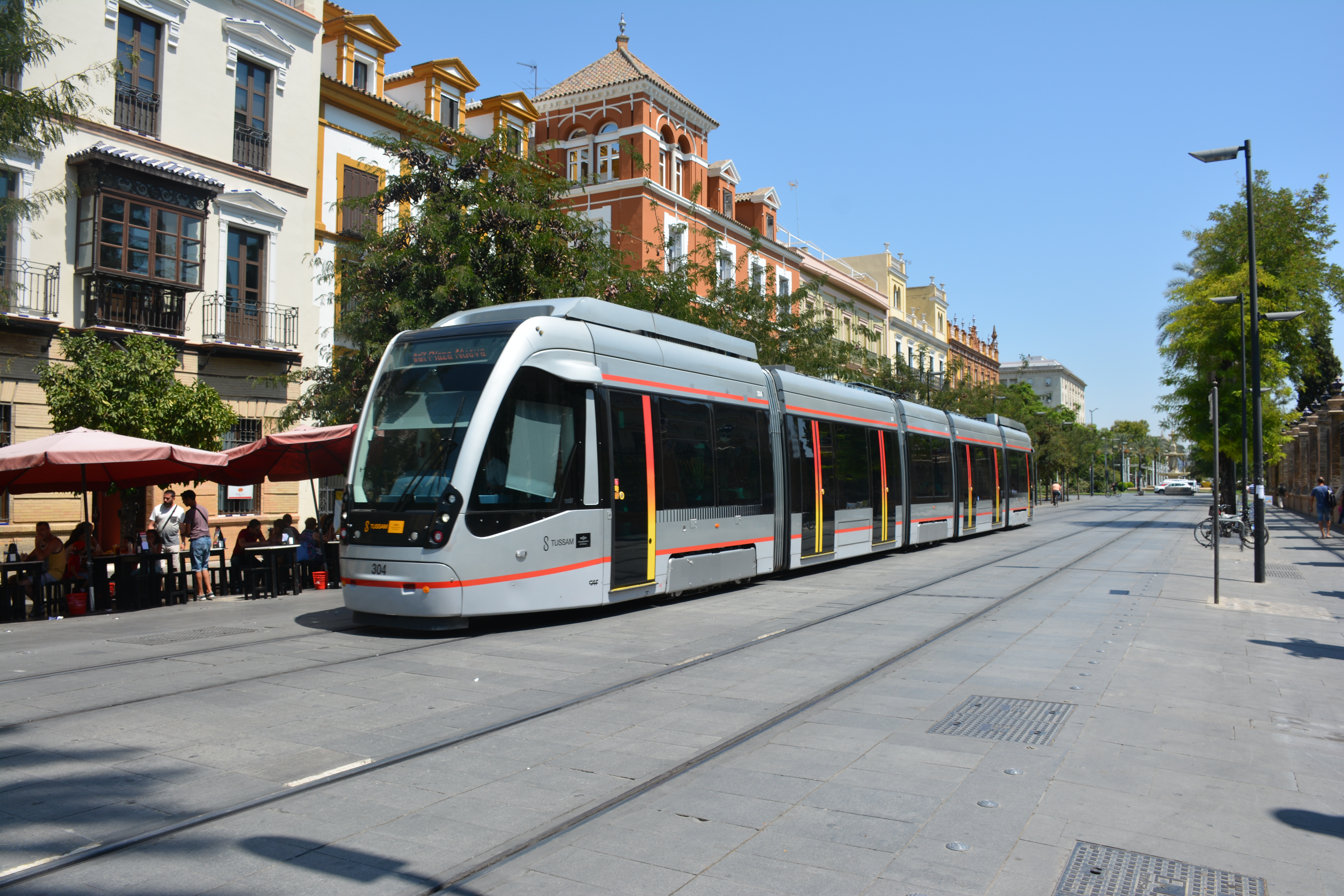
An ACR-equipped Urbos 3 tram running through central Seville without overhead line, 2015. The supercapacitors are visible on the roof of each end car.

Acumulador de Carga Rápida (ACR) (transl. fast-charging battery) is an electric tram system powered by onboard supercapacitors marketed by Spanish manufacturer Construcciones y Auxiliar de Ferrocarriles (CAF). Trams equipped with ACR are fast-charged while at stops; elsewhere they require no overhead line, which is desirable for reasons of safety, reliability, cost, and aesthetics. It also allows regenerative braking where direct current electrification systems cannot return (much) energy to the grid.

== Operation ==
ACR-equipped trams are powered between stops by discharging a rooftop supercapacitor, weighing around 1 tonne (2,200 lb), which gives a range of around 2 miles (3.2 km). The supercapacitor is partially recharged between stops by regenerative braking; at stops, it is completely recharged in around thirty seconds by current drawn via pantograph from a short section of overhead line.

== Marketing ==
CAF offers ACR as an option on its Urbos 3 tram; for retrofitting on trams built by CAF or other manufacturers; and for standard gauge and metre gauge tram systems.

ACR's most direct competitor is the ground-level power supply (APS) marketed by Alstom; CAF differentiates ACR against APS through its support of regenerative braking. CAF claims that ACR could be useful in rapid transit systems for the same reason.

== Installations ==
Since Seville's MetroCentro tramway opened in 2007, sections of its overhead line around the Seville Cathedral had been dismantled annually to allow Holy Week processions to pass safely. ACR's first commercial installation was aboard Urbos trams supplied to MetroCentro in 2011, allowing the permanent removal of overhead lines around the cathedral.

Line 1 of the Tranvía de Zaragoza has also used ACR since its second construction phase was completed in 2013. The use of ACR avoided the installation of overhead lines in the city's historic centre.

ACR was included in the Newcastle Light Rail in Australia and Luxembourg's new tram system.

== See also ==
- Ground-level power supply
