= Inner West Light Rail =

Light rail line in Sydney, New South Wales, Australia

L1 Dulwich Hill Line

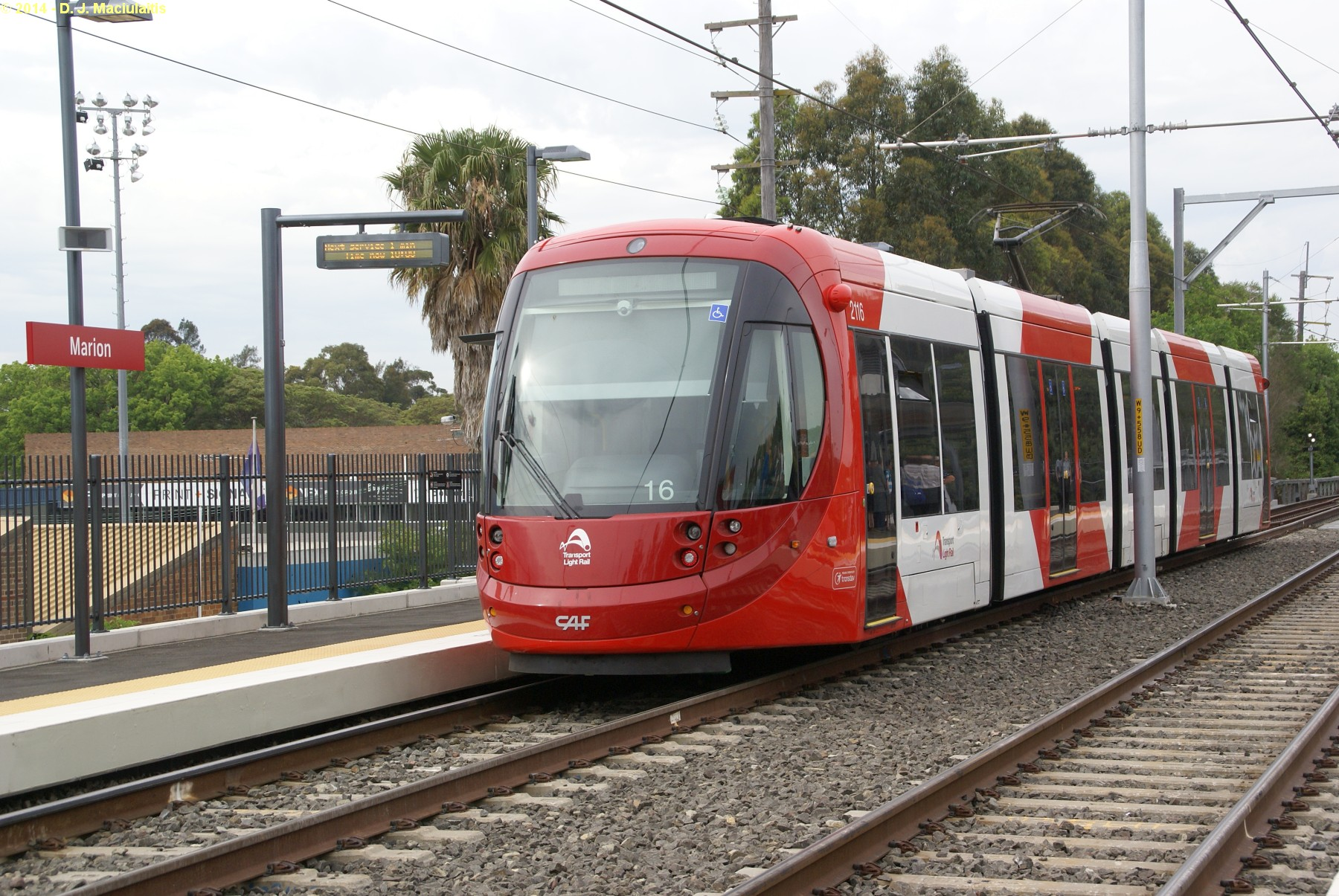
- A CAF Urbos 3 at Marion in 2014

Overview
- Other name: Inner West Light Rail
- Owner: Transport for NSW
- Locale: Sydney, New South Wales, Australia
- Termini: Central Grand Concourse; Dulwich Hill
- Stations: 23

Service
- Type: Light rail
- System: Sydney light rail
- Operator: Transdev Sydney
- Depot(s): Pyrmont, Lilyfield
- Rolling stock: Current: CAF Urbos 3, Alstom Citadis; Former: Adtranz Variotram, CAF Urbos 2
- Ridership: 8,502,709 (2025)

History
- Work began: January 1996
- Opened: 11 August 1997 (Central to Wentworth Park); 13 August 2000 (Wentworth Park to Lilyfield); 27 March 2014 (Lilyfield to Dulwich Hill)

Technical
- Line length: 12.8 km (8.0 mi)
- Num of tracks: 2
- Character: Street running, ground level, underground and elevated
- Track gauge: 1,435 mm (4 ft 8 1/2 in) standard gauge
- Electrification: 750 V DC from overhead lines
- Operating speed: 80 km/h (50 mph)

The Inner West Light Rail, also known as the L1 Dulwich Hill Line, is a light rail line in Sydney, New South Wales, Australia, running from Central station through the Inner West to Dulwich Hill station. Operated by Transdev Sydney under contract to Transport for NSW, the line is 12.8 kilometres (8.0 mi) long and has twenty-three stops. Most of the line follows the former Rozelle–Darling Harbour Goods Line, with a small street-running portion in Sydney's central business district.

In 1994, the Sydney Light Rail Company was awarded a contract to build and operate the line for 30.5 years. The first section, which runs for 3.6 kilometres (2.2 mi) from Central to Wentworth Park in Pyrmont with ten stops, opened on 11 August 1997. The four stops on the 3-kilometre (2 mi) extension to Lilyfield opened on 13 August 2000. Following the closure of the remaining section of the goods line in 2009, planning began for an extension to Dulwich Hill. In 2012, the state government acquired the line's operator, by then known as Metro Transport Sydney, and construction of the 5.5-kilometre (3.4 mi) extension began soon thereafter. The nine-stop extension opened on 27 March 2014.

The line initially operated with seven Adtranz Variotram vehicles. These were replaced by twelve CAF Urbos 3 trams, which entered service from 2014. Four additional Urbos 3 trams were introduced in 2023. Due to cracking in the Urbos 3 bogies, the Inner West Light Rail was temporarily closed from October 2021; it reopened in February 2022 using Alstom Citadis trams transferred from the CBD and South East Light Rail; the Urbos 3 trams were repaired later that year. Headways reach as low as six minutes during peak periods and as high as fifteen minutes at night time. The journey from Central to Dulwich Hill takes 36–37 minutes. Patronage was initially below forecasts but exceeded projections following the opening of the Dulwich Hill extension. In 2025, the line carried 8,502,709 passengers.

== History ==
In 1916, a goods railway line opened between Dulwich Hill and Rozelle Bay. It was extended to link with the existing Darling Harbour line in 1922 to form the Rozelle–Darling Harbour Goods Line. The line served a number of flour mills and shipping harbours such as Darling Harbour, which is immediately west of Sydney's central business district (CBD). The growth of containerised freight and the relocation of shipping operations to Port Botany led to a decline in goods line traffic from the 1970s. The Darling Harbour line closed in 1984, while the section between Darling Harbour and Rozelle Bay was earmarked for closure from the 1990s.

Sydney formerly had an extensive tram network, which spanned 292 kilometres (181 mi) at its peak in 1923. Tram services ceased in 1961, following the gradual withdrawal of routes.

=== Original line ===
In 1984, the government of New South Wales announced that Darling Harbour would be redeveloped. The government subsequently sought proposals for transport links to the area. Thomas Nationwide Transport (TNT) proposed a monorail, while Transfield and Comeng put forward a light rail line. From Pyrmont, the proposed light rail line would have crossed Pyrmont Bridge before branching towards Central station and Circular Quay via Hickson Road and Sussex Street. The light rail proposal received support from the National Trust, public transport advocates, environmental groups and Bob Carr, the minister for planning and environment, while the minister for public works, Laurie Brereton, favoured the monorail. The monorail proposal was selected, and the Sydney Monorail opened in 1988.

Following the redevelopment of Darling Harbour, the government proposed a wider urban renewal program for Pyrmont, a former industrial area to the west of the CBD. In 1992, the state and federal governments agreed to redevelop the Ultimo–Pyrmont area under the federal government's Building Better Cities program. The agreement included funding for a light rail line from Central station to Pyrmont via Ultimo, using the former goods line as its right of way. The line was intended to support the area's redevelopment and provide access to major attractions, including the Sydney Entertainment Centre, Darling Harbour, the Powerhouse Museum, the Australian National Maritime Museum, the Sydney Fish Market, and the future Star Casino.

The line was built and operated under a build–own–operate–transfer (BOOT) contract. The state government called for expressions of interest in July 1993, attracting nine consortia, four of which were shortlisted in November. The Sydney Light Rail Company (SLRC) was awarded the contract in June 1994. (Note: The contract was between the New South Wales Department of Transport and the Pyrmont Light Rail Company, a subsidiary of the Sydney Light Rail Company.) The SLRC consortium comprised the Australian Industry Development Corporation, GHD Transmark, ABB and TNT, which provided financing, project management, rolling stock and operations, respectively. (Note: The Sydney Light Rail Company was owned by AIDC, Utilities Trust of Australia and Legal & General Life.)

Under the BOOT contract, the SLRC would own and operate the light rail line for a 30.5 year concession period, set its own fares and receive most fare revenue. (Note: The Sydney Light Rail Company had to pay the Department of Transport one third of net fare revenue from passengers above eighty percent of 1993 patronage estimates.) The government was prohibited from operating any competing public transport services to the Pyrmont–Ultimo area without consulting the SLRC, and the SLRC was given right of first refusal for any interconnecting light rail lines, including extensions further along the goods line and into the CBD. The capital cost of the line was A$87.5 million, (Note: All currency totals are unadjusted for inflation.) of which $21.5 million was provided to the SLRC by the state and federal governments and the remainder financed by the consortium; an additional $3.5 million was spent by the two governments on project management and feasibility studies.

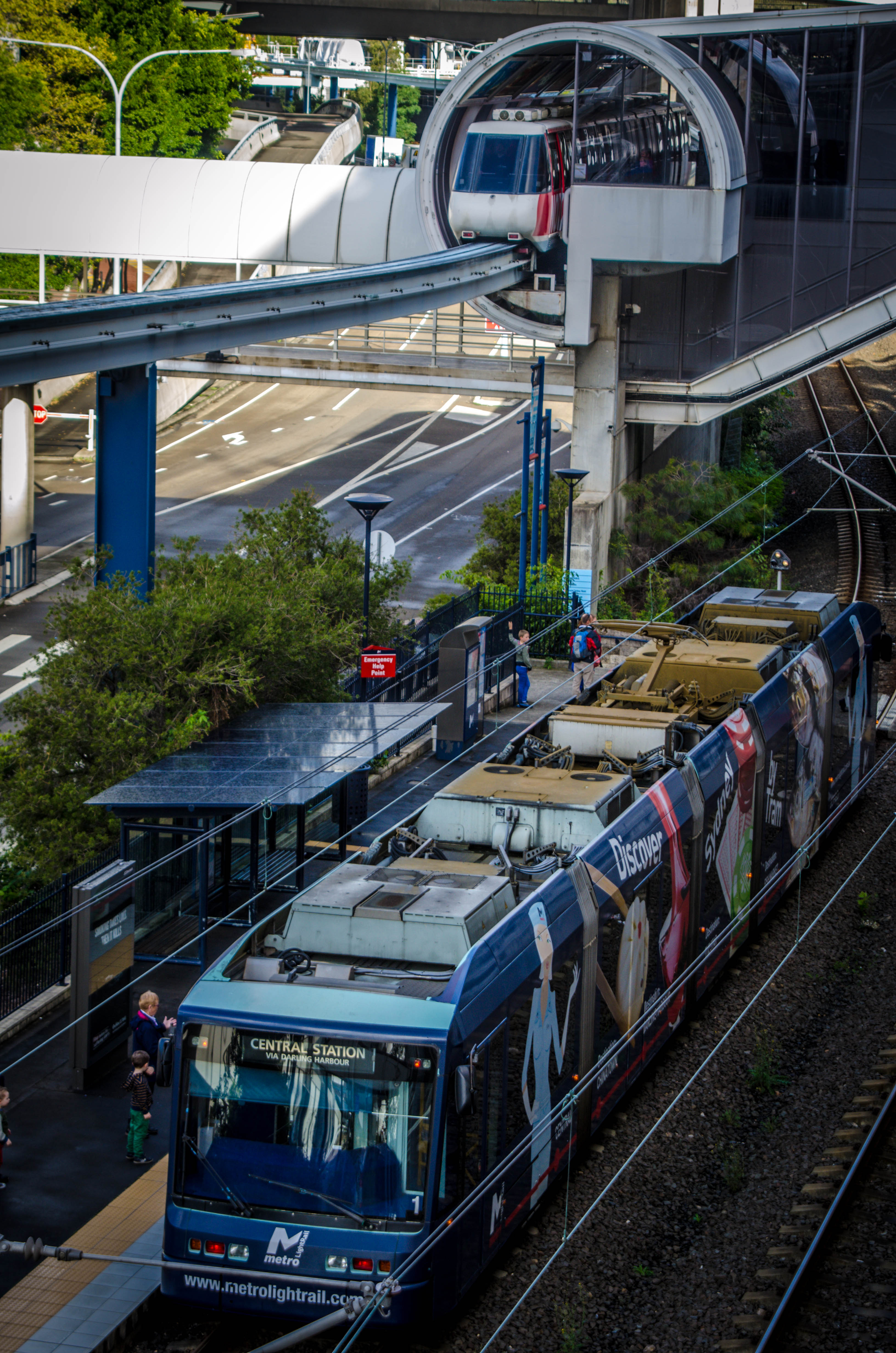
The light rail line passing underneath the Sydney Monorail at Convention

The goods line closed in January 1996, and preliminary construction work began that month with the removal of its timber sleepers. A groundbreaking ceremony was held on 25 January with the federal minister for housing, Brian Howe, and the state minister for transport, Brian Langton. The 3.6-kilometre (2.2 mi) line opened between Central and Wentworth Park on 11 August 1997. Initially, services operated between 9 am and 5 pm at twelve minute headways because the full tram fleet had not yet been delivered. The premier of New South Wales, Bob Carr, officially opened the line on 31 August 1997, with celebrations that included fireworks. Full service began the following day, with peak hour headways as low as 5 1/2 minutes and operating hours from 6 am to midnight.

In 1998, TNT sold its contract to operate the light rail and ownership of the Sydney Monorail to CGEA Transport, which resulted in the integration of the monorail's ticketing, maintenance, marketing and management with that of the light rail system.

=== Extension to Lilyfield ===
An August 1995 feasibility study found that extending the line from Wentworth Park to Marion was viable, and that future extensions could go to Dulwich Hill station or one of the stations on the Main Suburban railway line. In May 1997, the State Cabinet gave in-principle support to extending the light rail line to Lilyfield in the west and Circular Quay in the CBD. An environmental impact statement for the two extensions was published in October 1997.

In November 1998, the government approved the 3-kilometre (2 mi) extension to Lilyfield and committed $16 million, with the SLRC financing the remaining $4 million. The extension included four new stops: Glebe, Jubilee Park, Rozelle Bay and Lilyfield. A decision on the proposed CBD extension was deferred amid opposition from CBD businesses concerned about disruption during construction. The contract between the state government and the SLRC was finalised in December 1999; construction began on 14 December, with an anticipated opening date of August 2000. The extension was opened on 13 August 2000 by Premier Carr.

=== Extension to Dulwich Hill ===
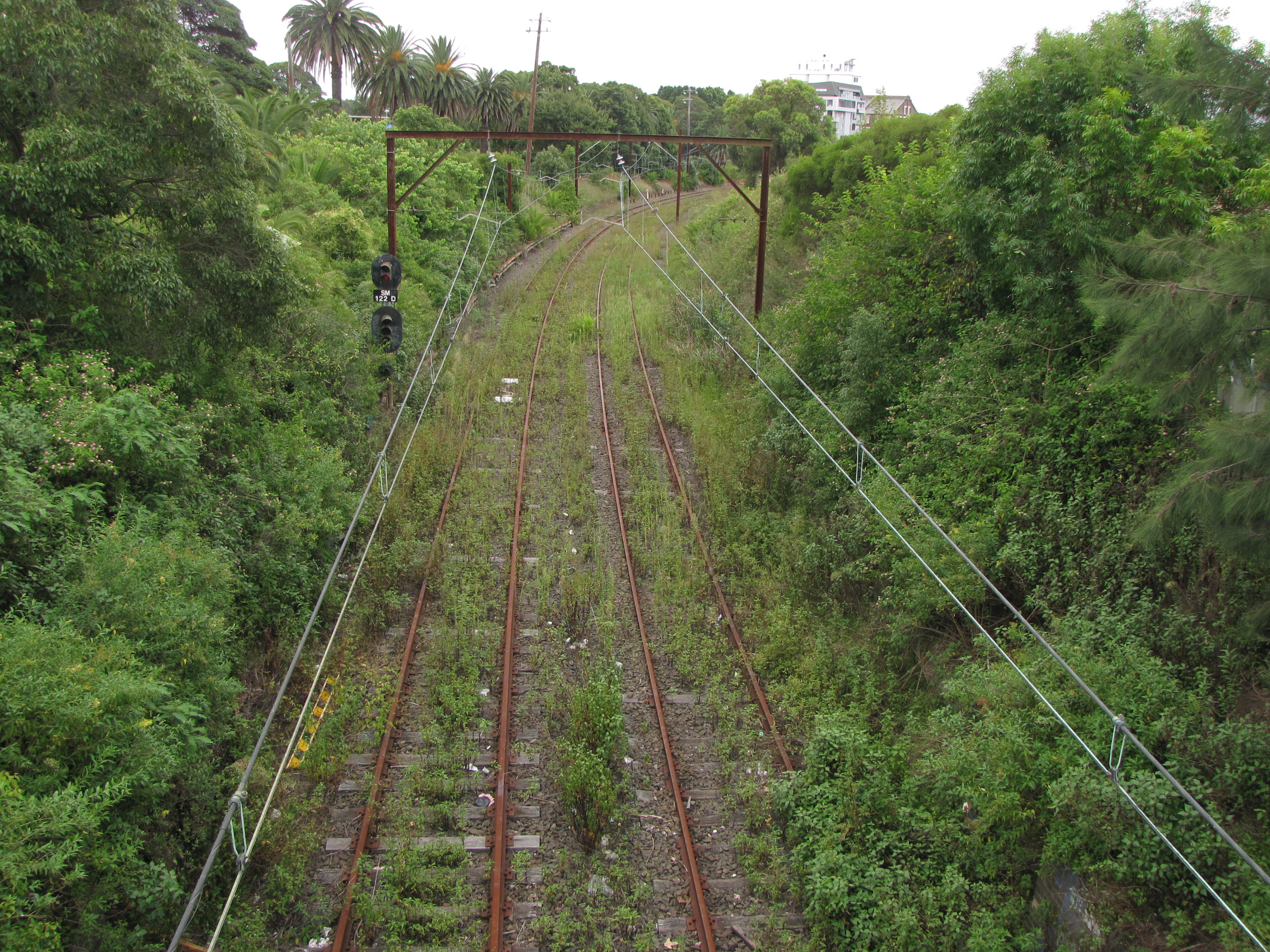
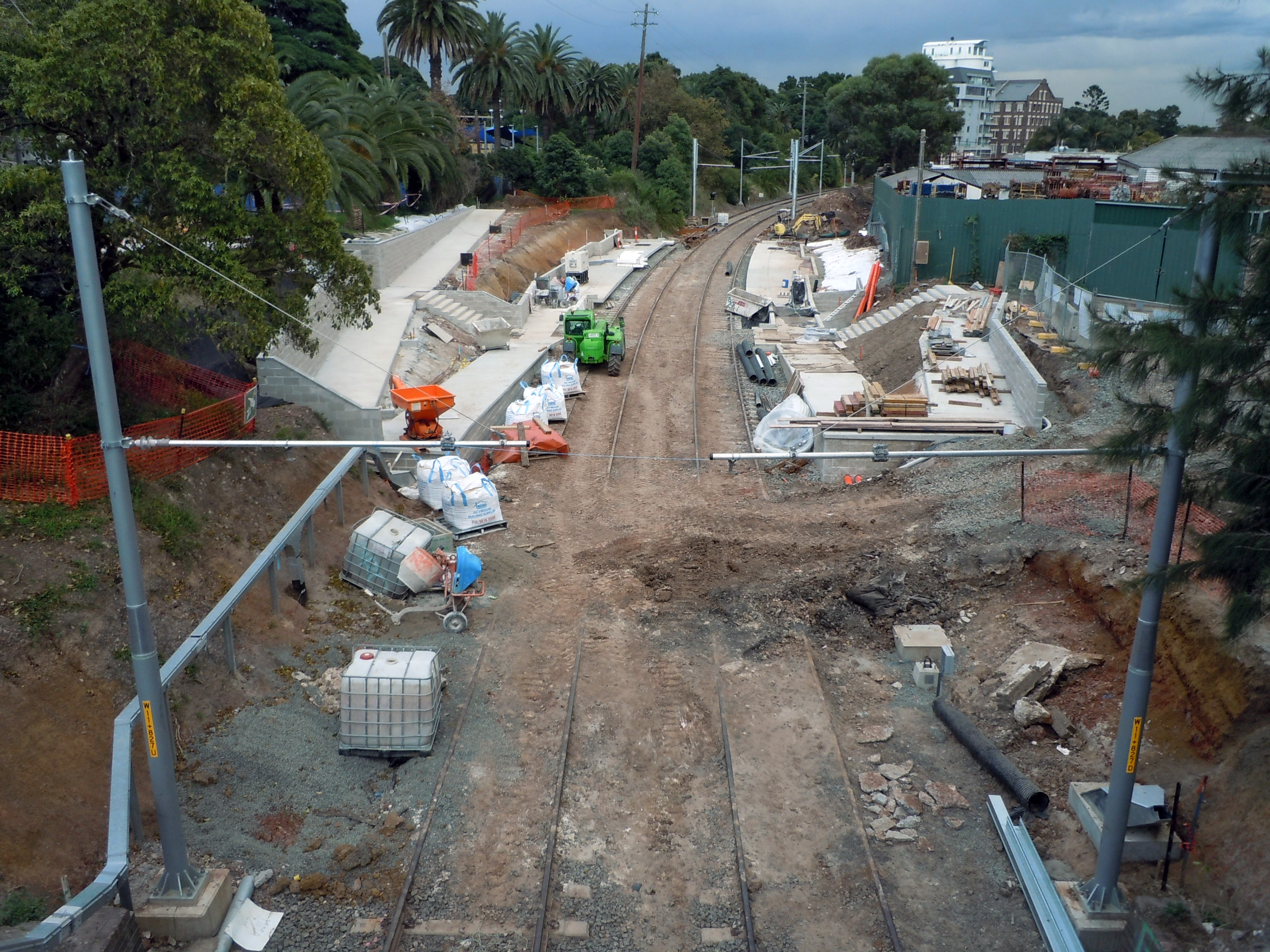
The light rail corridor at the Arlington light rail stop before (February 2010) and during construction (August 2013)

In 2007, the last remaining user of the freight line, Allied Mills in Summer Hill, was sold to a property developer, allowing the line to close in 2009. The same year, the government again looked into extending the light rail line to Dulwich Hill. After Kristina Keneally became the premier of New South Wales in late 2009, she cancelled the proposed Sydney Metro in February 2010. Instead, she announced extensions of the light rail line to Dulwich Hill station and through the CBD to Circular Quay. The combined cost of the two extensions was estimated to be $500 million. The locations of the stops along the extension to Dulwich Hill were announced in July 2010. In 2012, the new Liberal government incorporated the extension to Circular Quay into the new CBD and South East Light Rail line instead of the Inner West line.

Two major challenges for the Dulwich Hill extension were cost overruns and the BOOT contract. The GreenWay, a proposed walking and cycling corridor from Iron Cove to the Cooks River, was planned to run alongside the light rail extension. The costs of the extension and the GreenWay had escalated and the GreenWay complicated the construction of the light rail extension. By 2011, the GreenWay's estimated cost had risen from $30 million to $37 million, and that of the light rail extension from $120 million to $176 million. In September 2011, the state's transport minister, Gladys Berejiklian, cancelled the GreenWay to address the budget shortfall and postponed the extension's completion by eighteen months to early 2014. Under the BOOT contract, the operator, now known as Metro Transport Sydney (MTS), had the exclusive right to the extension to Dulwich Hill. MTS would have financed and constructed the extension, with the government repaying the cost over the concession's remaining thirteen years. In March 2012, the state government acquired MTS for $19.8 million, a move it said would facilitate the light rail extension by simplifying contractual arrangements. It was also announced that the monorail would be shut down.

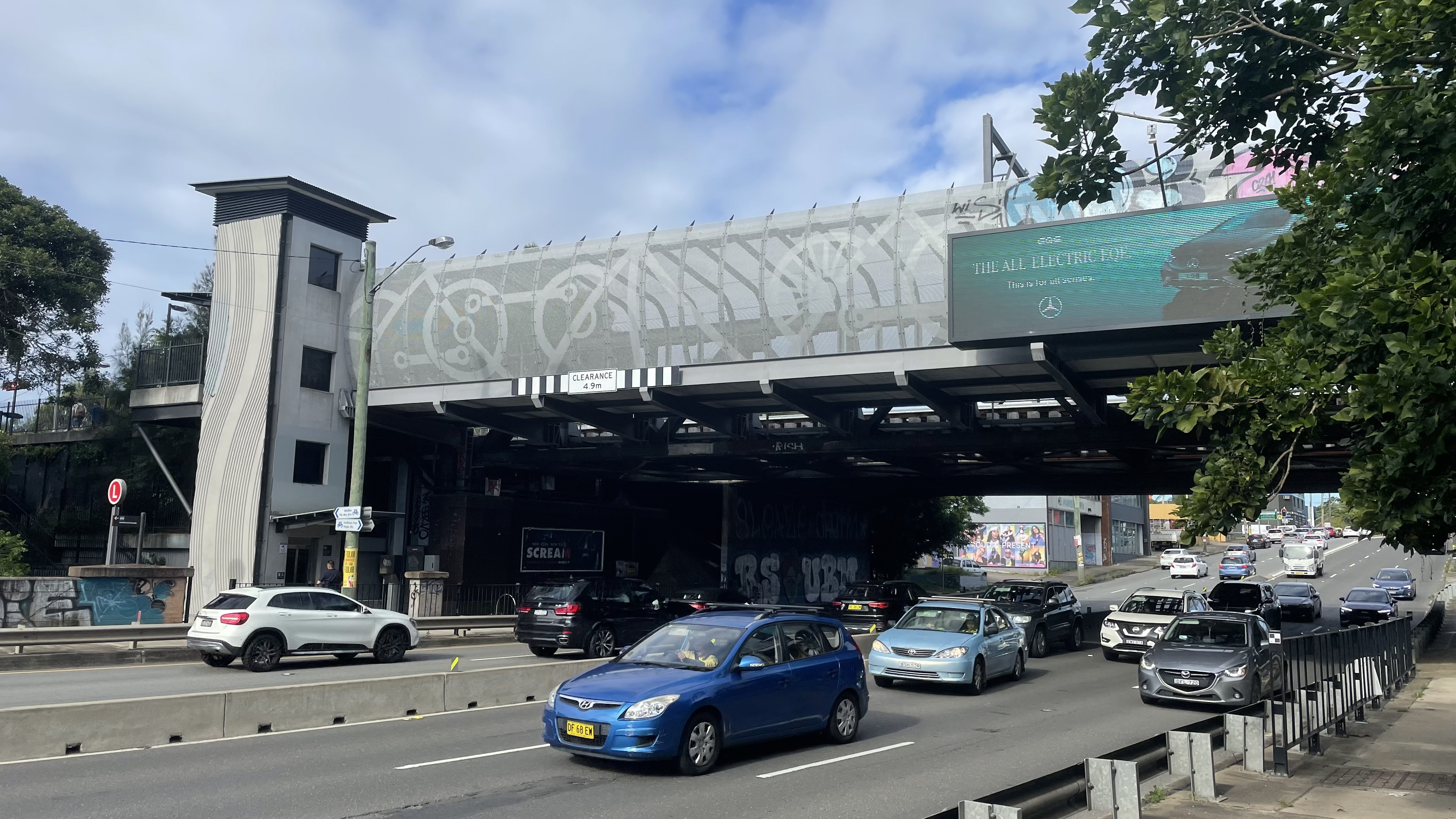
The bridge over Parramatta Road

In May 2012, the design and construction contract for the 5.5-kilometre (3.4 mi) extension was awarded to John Holland. Some residents and public transport advocates questioned the extension's cost and construction schedule because the tracks from the goods line were still in place. Designs for the new stops were released for public consultation in October 2012. Construction began in November 2012. Work involved installing overhead wiring, strengthening embankments, building platforms, installing lifts for some stops, and raising the bridge over Parramatta Road. By February 2014, construction was complete and track testing had begun. The extension was opened on 27 March 2014 by Premier Barry O'Farrell and Transport Minister Berejiklian.

=== Later history ===
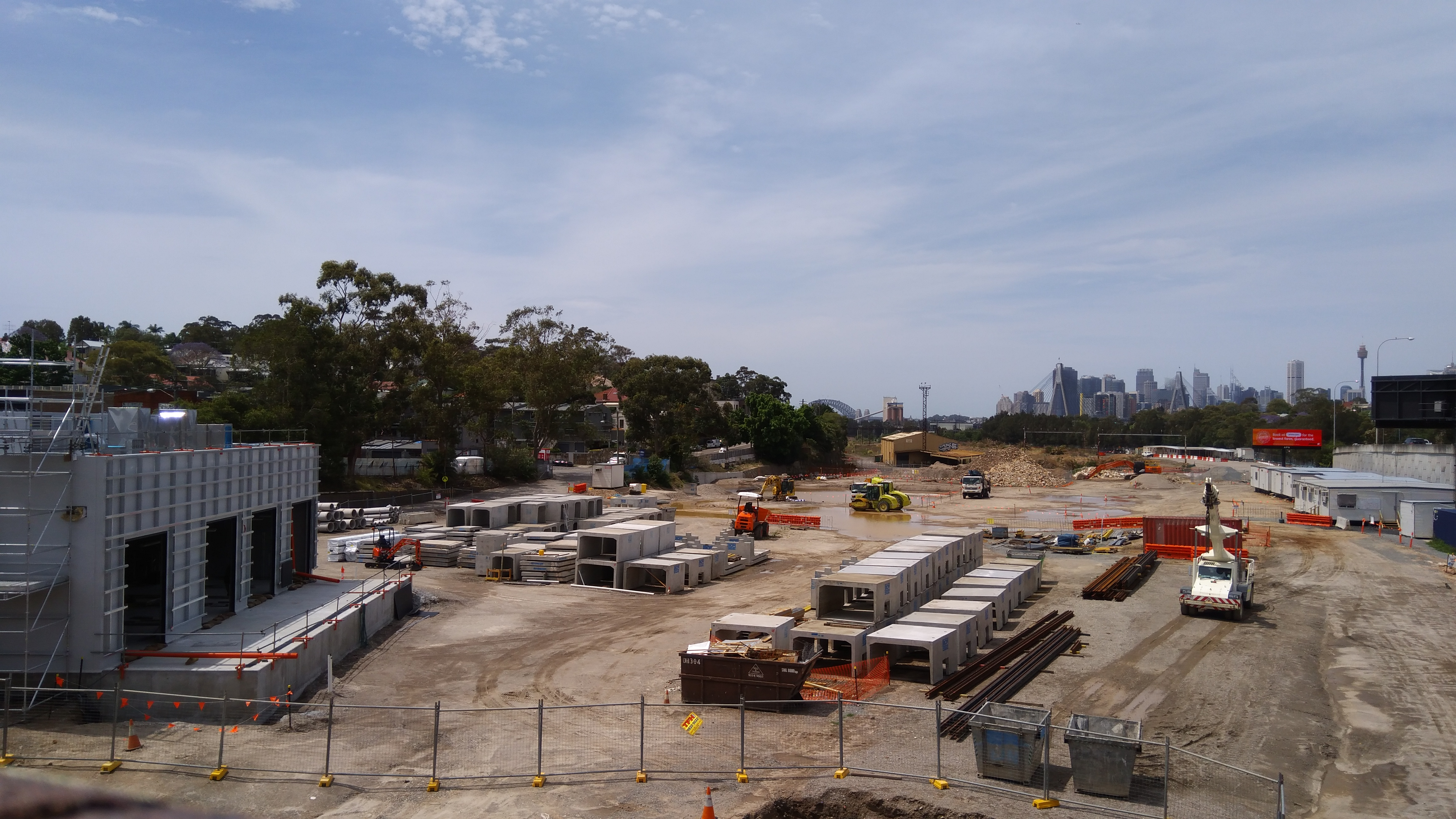
Lilyfield depot under construction in 2017

A maintenance depot serving both light rail lines was constructed at Lilyfield as part of the CBD and South East Light Rail project. Construction began in May 2017 and was completed by early 2019. A junction linking the two lines at the intersection of Hay and George streets was built to allow CBD and South East Light Rail vehicles to access the depot. The first phase of the new light rail line opened in December 2019, providing an interchange with the Inner West Light Rail at Central station and Capitol Square. The second phase opened in April 2020.

The GreenWay project resumed following a $14 million funding commitment from the state government and Inner West Council in 2016. The state government allocated an additional $9.8 million towards the GreenWay in 2022. The GreenWay opened in December 2025.

The Fish Market stop was renamed Bank Street in January 2026, coinciding with the opening of the new Sydney Fish Market, which is closer to the Wentworth Park stop.

== Description ==
The Inner West Light Rail, also known as the Dulwich Hill line, uses 1,435 mm (4 ft 8 1/2 in) standard gauge track. Trams are powered by 750 V DC overhead lines. Off-street tracks use fixed-block signalling with track circuits. On-street tracks operate by line-of-sight. The maximum permitted speed is 80 kilometres per hour (50 mph) on off-street sections and 20 kilometres per hour (12 mph) on the street-running section. Automatic train protection is used.

=== Route ===
The Inner West Light Rail begins at Central station's grand concourse, which formerly served as a terminus for Sydney's original tram network. The line loops around Belmore Park before running west along Hay Street for 700 metres (2,300 ft). It then enters the former goods railway corridor, which it follows for the remainder of the route. The route passes through the heritage-listed Pyrmont and Glebe tunnels, constructed between 1916 and 1922. The longer of the two, the Glebe tunnel, is 800 metres (2,600 ft) long and passes under the residential area of Glebe. There are also the Glebe and Wentworth Park viaducts—two brick arch viaducts spanning 446.5 metres (1,465 ft) and 274 metres (899 ft) respectively. They are the longest brick viaducts in New South Wales. The line has two depots: the original Pyrmont depot, which is used to stable vehicles, and the Lilyfield depot, which is used for heavy maintenance. At Dulwich Hill station, the line interchanges with the Metro North West & Bankstown Line. The line has a total length of 12.8 kilometres (8.0 mi).

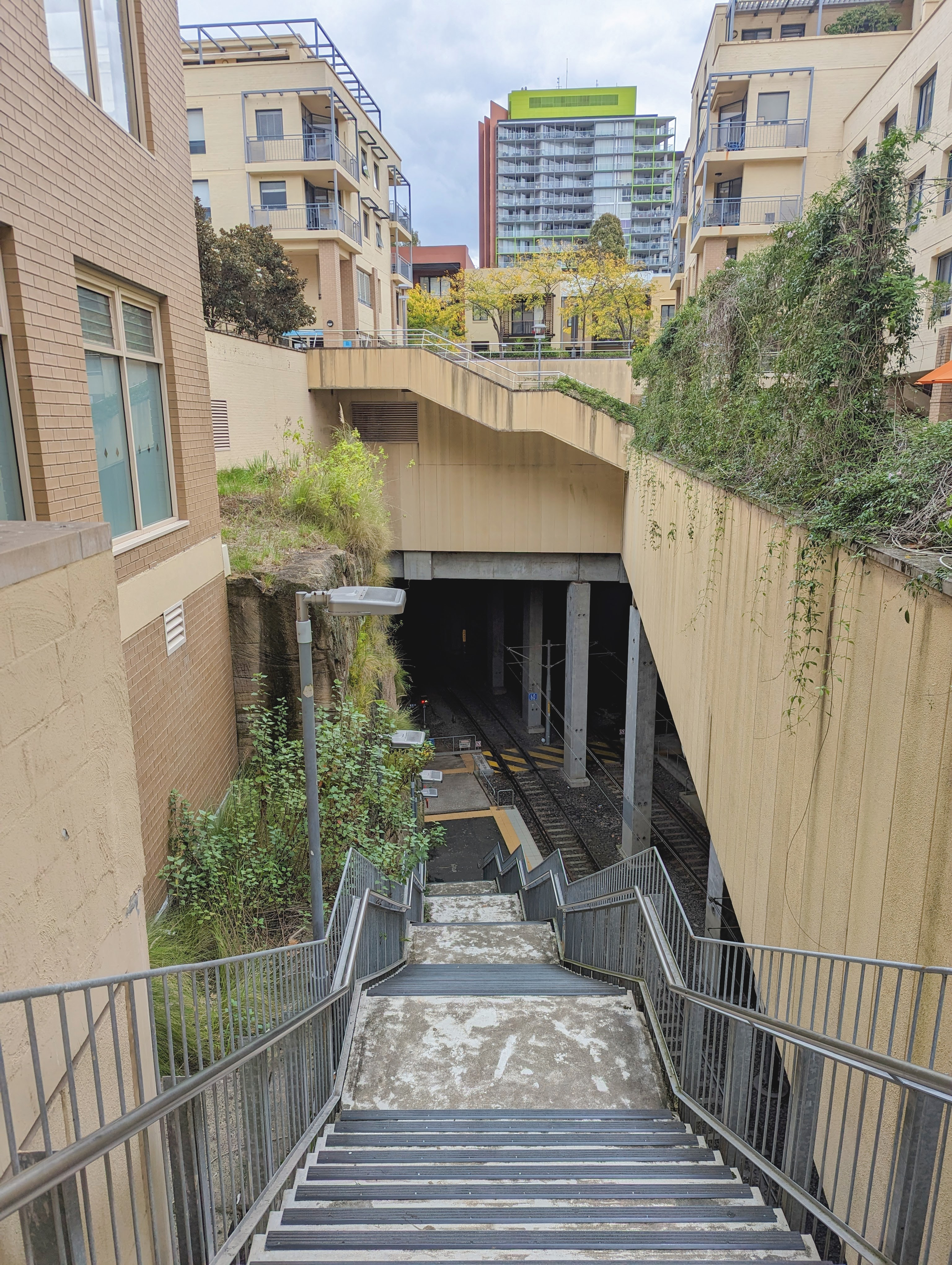
The Pyrmont tunnel

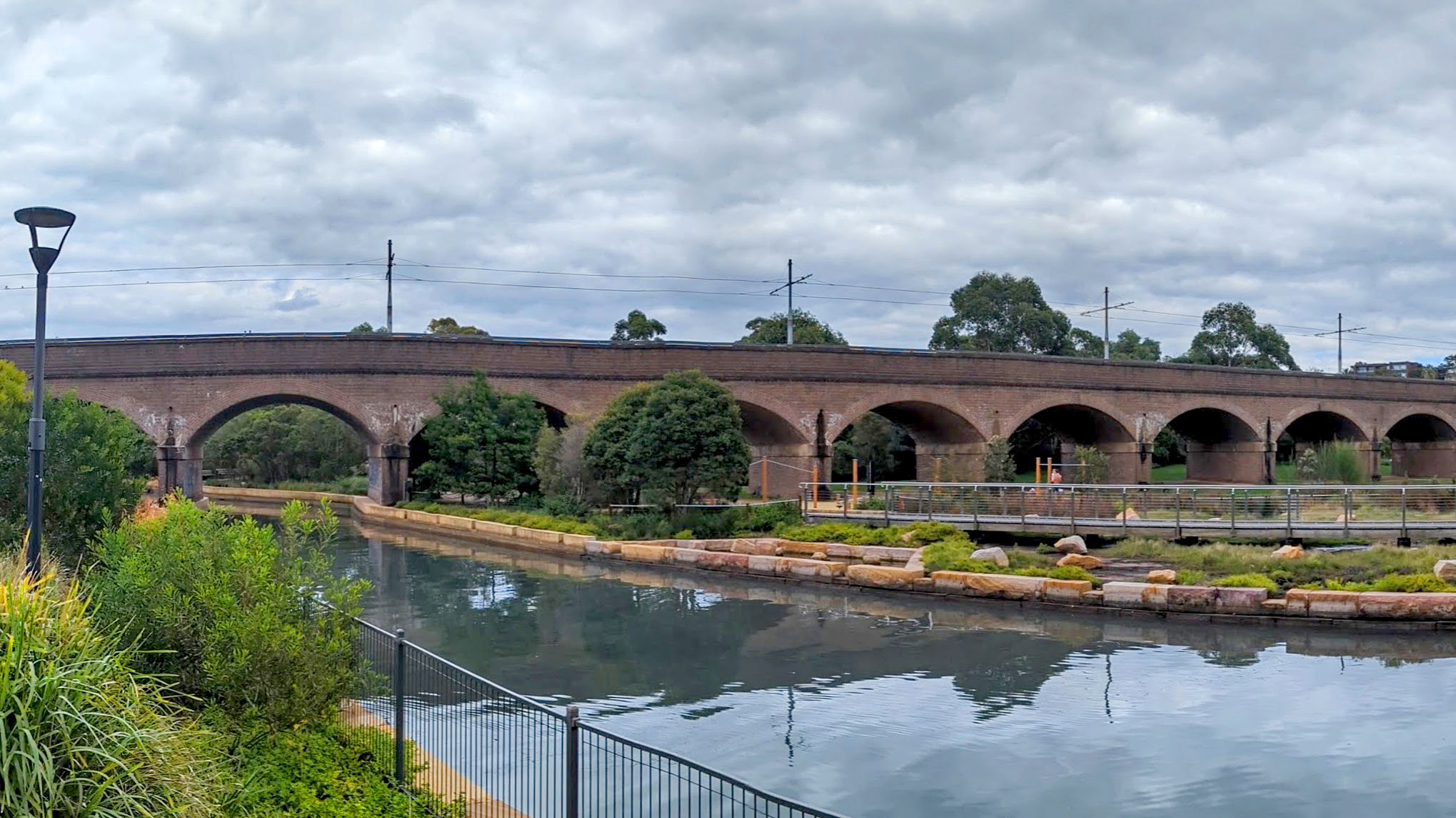
The Glebe viaduct

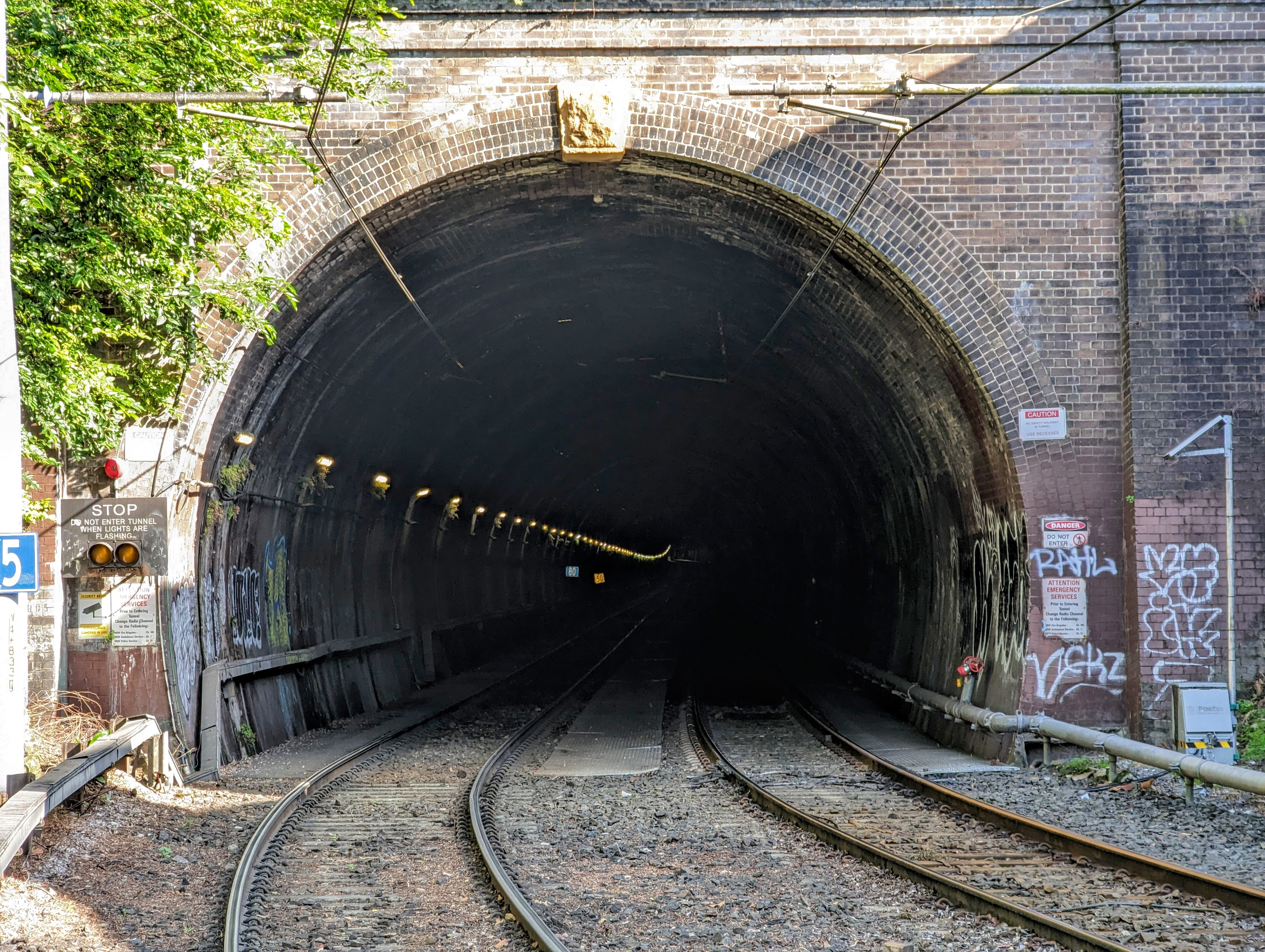
The Glebe tunnel

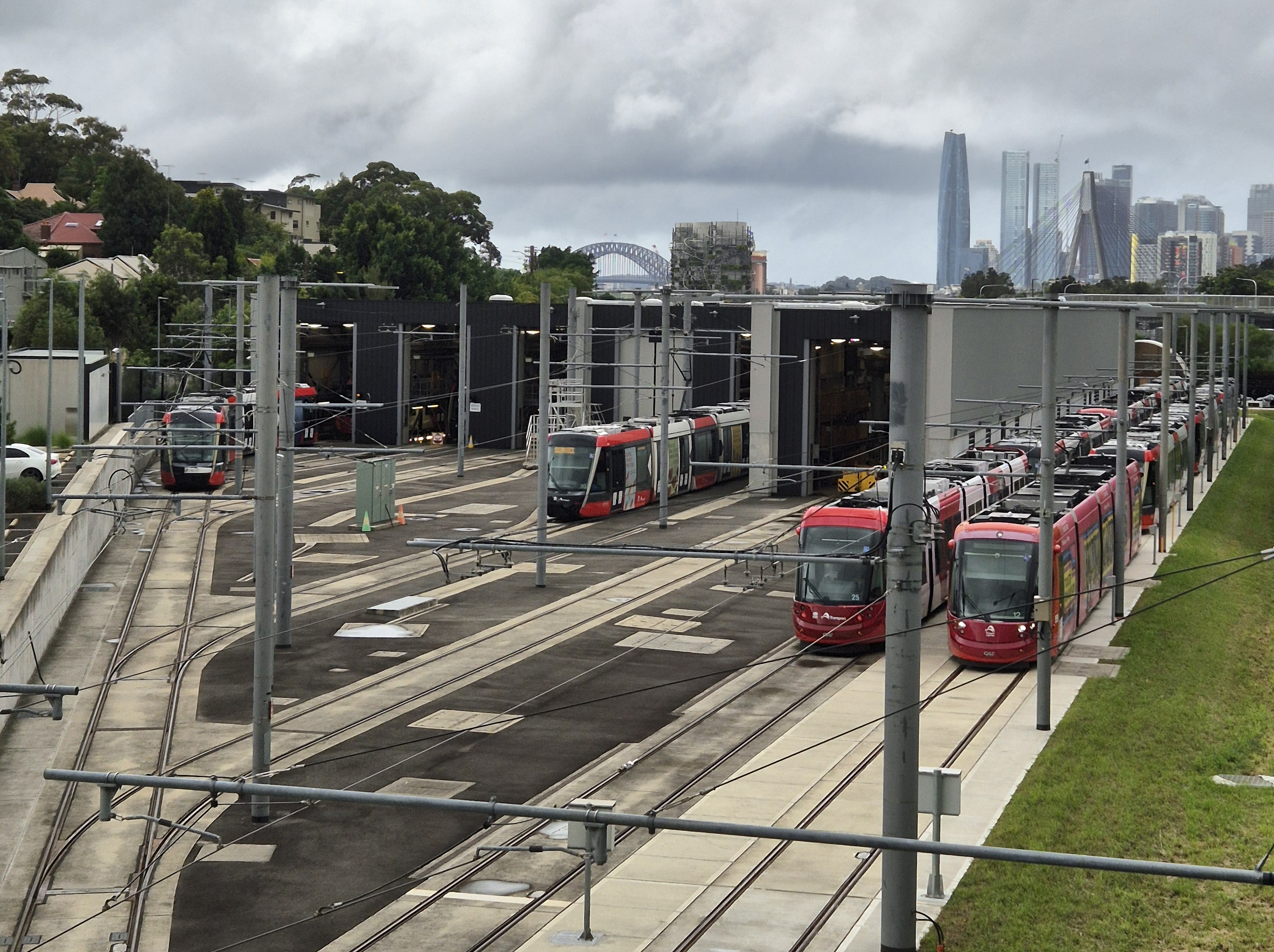
Lilyfield Maintenance Centre

=== Stops ===
Each of the 23 stops is fully accessible. There is level boarding at all stops, ramps at some stops and a lift at other stops. Platforms are 30 metres (98 ft) long.

Stop	Image	Location	Opened	Connections
Central Grand Concourse	Tram at a light rail stop outside a heritage railway station	Sydney CBD	11 August 1997	Sydney Trains; Sydney Metro; CBD and South East Light Rail at Central Chalmers Street
Capitol Square	Tram at a light rail stop on the street	Haymarket	11 August 1997	CBD and South East Light Rail at Chinatown
Paddy's Markets	Tram at a light rail stop on the street	Haymarket	11 August 1997	
Exhibition Centre	Light rail stop	Sydney CBD	11 August 1997	
Convention	Light rail stop	Sydney CBD	11 August 1997	
Pyrmont Bay	Underground light rail stop	Pyrmont	11 August 1997	Sydney Ferries at Pyrmont Bay ferry wharf
The Star	Underground light rail stop	Pyrmont	11 August 1997	
John Street Square	Light rail stop in a large trench	Pyrmont	11 August 1997	
Bank Street (Note: Known as Fish Market before 2026.)	Light rail stop in a trench	Pyrmont	11 August 1997	
Wentworth Park	Light rail stop	Pyrmont	11 August 1997	
Glebe	Light rail stop	Glebe	13 August 2000	
Jubilee Park	Light rail stop	Glebe	13 August 2000	
Rozelle Bay	Light rail stop	Annandale	13 August 2000	
Lilyfield	Light rail stop viewed from a bridge	Lilyfield	13 August 2000	
Leichhardt North	Light rail stop	Lilyfield	27 March 2014	
Hawthorne	Light rail stop	Leichhardt	27 March 2014	
Marion	Light rail stop on an embankment	Leichhardt	27 March 2014	
Taverners Hill	Light rail stop	Leichhardt	27 March 2014	
Lewisham West	Light rail stop	Lewisham	27 March 2014	
Waratah Mills	Light rail stop	Dulwich Hill	27 March 2014	
Arlington	Light rail stop	Dulwich Hill	27 March 2014	
Dulwich Grove	Tram at a light rail stop	Dulwich Hill	27 March 2014	
Dulwich Hill	Tram at a light rail stop	Dulwich Hill	27 March 2014	Sydney Metro

== Service ==
Services operate at six-minute intervals during weekday peaks and daytime weekends, with intervals increasing to fifteen minutes early in the morning and late at night. The end-to-end travel time is 36 to 37 minutes. Services commence at 5:00 am and end at 1:37 am each day. In 2017, The Sydney Morning Herald reported that the single-track terminus at Dulwich Hill prevented services from operating more frequently than every eight minutes, but in 2019, the state minister for transport and roads said that such an upgrade would not be needed for six-minute headways. Peak-hour intervals were reduced to six minutes in January 2024. Duplicating the terminus is still proposed by the Inner West Council to increase frequency and reliability.

Initially, the line was operated by TNT as part of the SLRC consortium. TNT sold the operating contract to CGEA Transport in 1998, which later rebranded as Connex and then Veolia Transport. Veolia merged with Transdev, the current light rail operator, in 2011. From July 2013 to mid-2015, after Metro Transport Sydney was acquired, the line was operated by Transdev under a $45 million contract. Since July 2015, the line has been operated by Transdev as part of the ALTRAC Consortium, the consortium which was to build and operate the CBD and South East Light Rail.

=== Ticketing ===
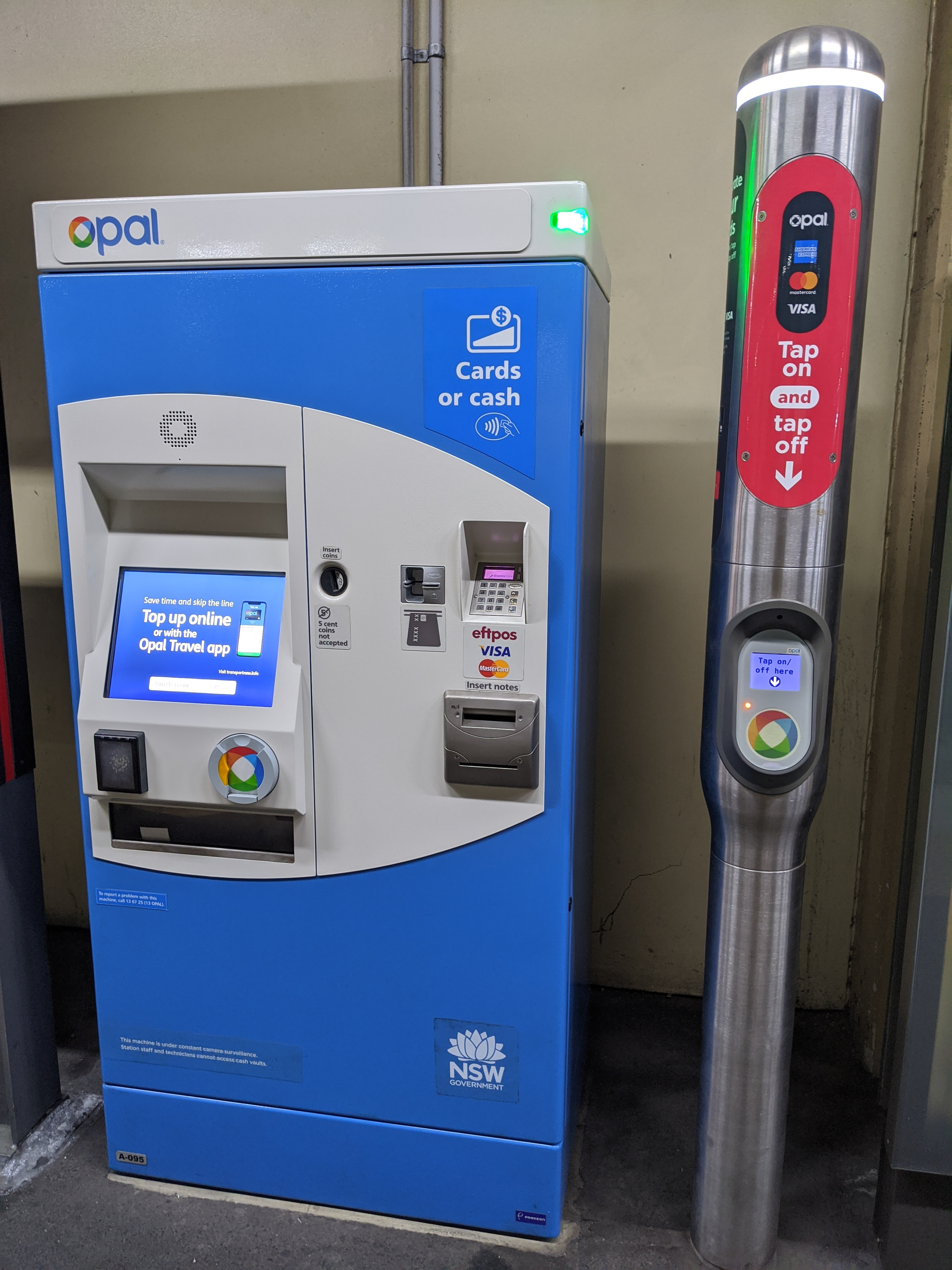
An Opal card machine and reader at Pyrmont Bay

The line initially had a separate ticketing system from the rest of Sydney's public transport network. In June 2011, MyMulti tickets, pensioner excursion tickets, and Family Funday Sunday tickets, which were previously introduced to the rest of the public transport system, were allowed on the line. Metro Transport Sydney retained its existing fare structure, under which fares were substantially higher than those on other public transport services. The state government's acquisition of Metro Transport Sydney in March 2012 facilitated the integration of the light rail's ticketing system. The smartcard-based Opal ticketing system was introduced to the line on 1 December 2014. The Opal system had a different fare structure than the paper tickets. Paper tickets were fully withdrawn on 1 August 2016.

=== Rolling stock ===
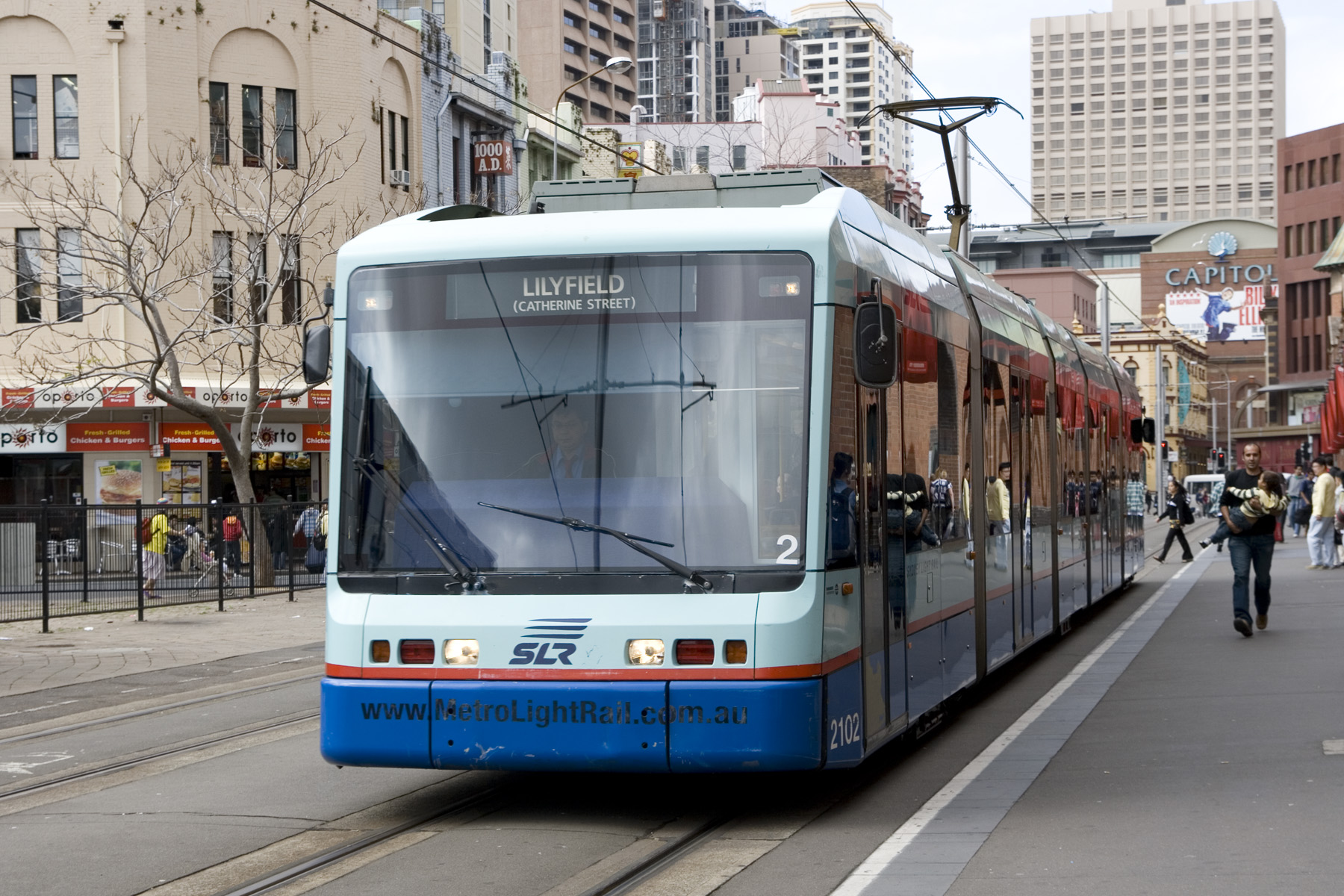
An Adtranz Variotram, pictured in 2007

Seven Variotrams entered service in 1997 as the line's original rolling stock. These were manufactured by Adtranz (formerly ABB) at the Dandenong rolling stock factory in Melbourne for $25 million. Each tram was 28 metres (92 ft) long and featured a fully low-floor design.

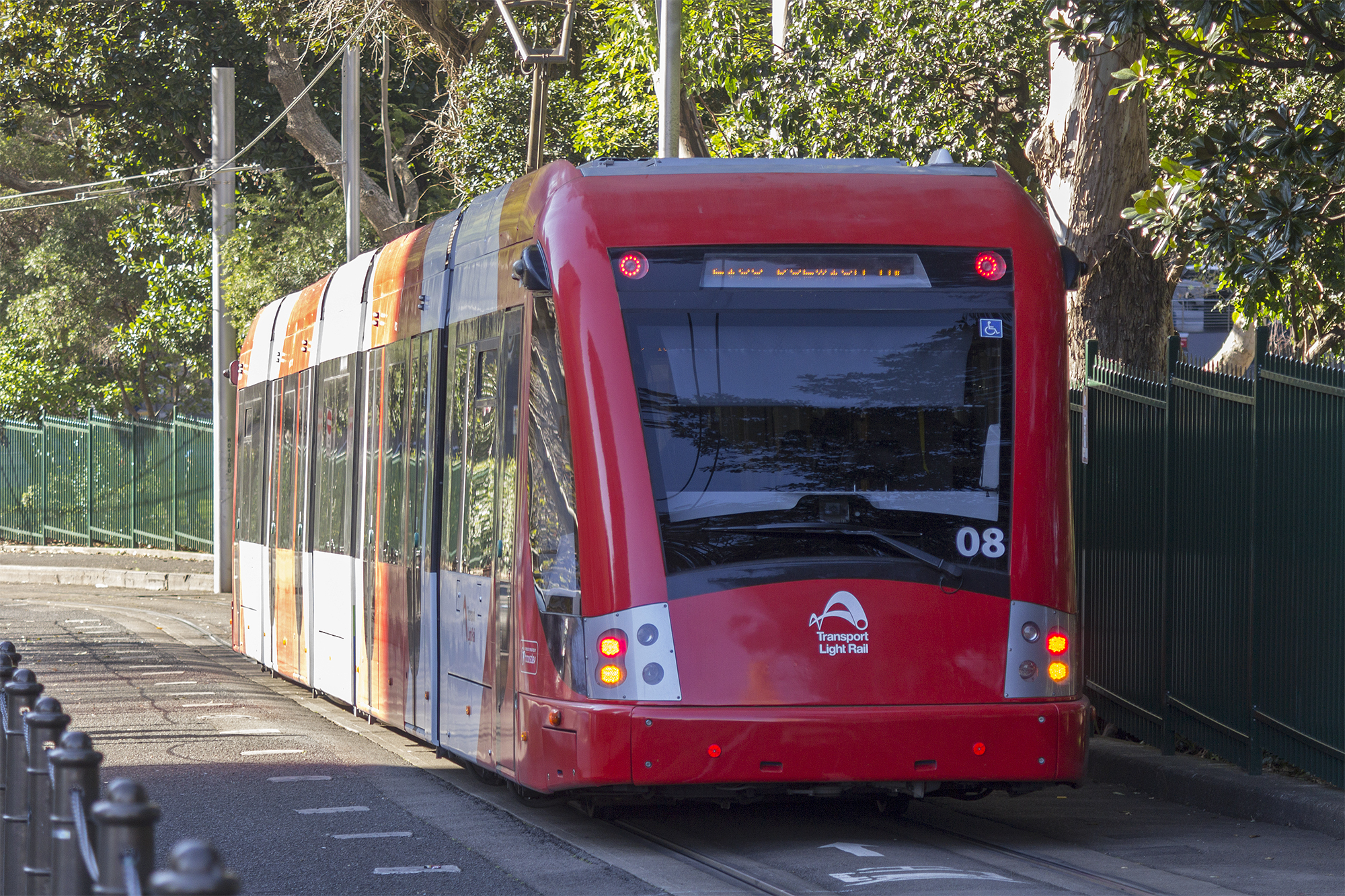
A CAF Urbos 2, pictured in 2014

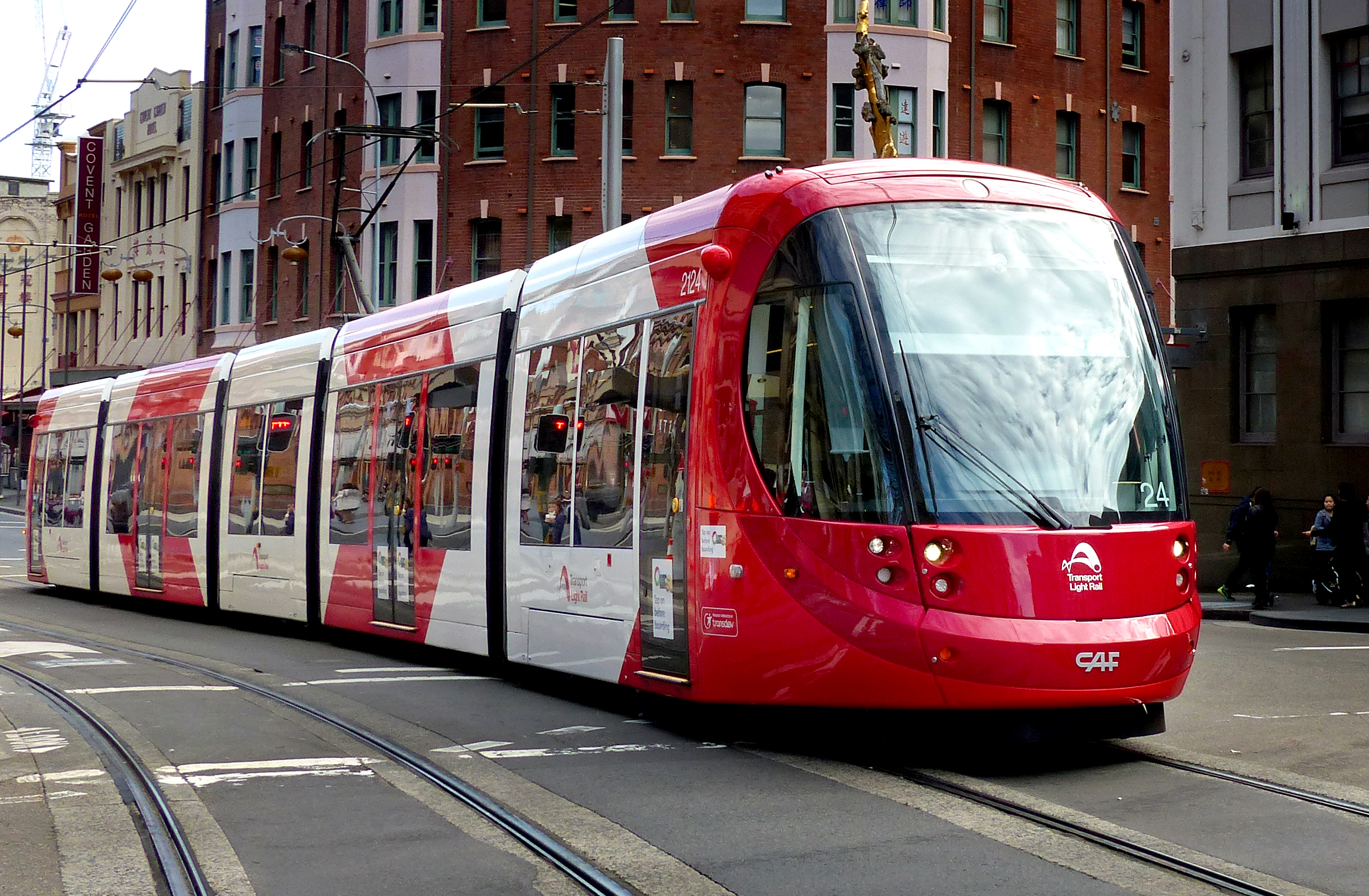
A CAF Urbos 3, pictured in 2015

In August 2012, a contract was awarded to CAF for the delivery of six new Urbos 3 trams and the lease of four Urbos 2 trams for $20 million for the Dulwich Hill extension. Three of the leased trams came from the defunct Vélez-Málaga Tram in Spain. In October 2013, six additional Urbos 3 trams were ordered for $19 million, allowing for the retirement of the Variotrams. The first Urbos 3 tram arrived in Sydney in December 2013. All four leased Urbos 2 trams had entered service by the time the Dulwich Hill extension opened. The first six Urbos 3 trams entered service in July and August 2014, allowing the Urbos 2 trams to be withdrawn. By 2015, the remaining six Urbos 3 trams were in service and the Variotrams were withdrawn and sold off.

By 2018, Transport for NSW was considering acquiring four additional trams to ease overcrowding and lower peak headways from eight minutes to six minutes. In June 2021, a $25 million contract was awarded to CAF for the delivery of the four trams, which entered service in the second half of 2023.

=== Incidents ===
The line was closed for several weeks following two derailments near Rozelle Bay and Wentworth Park on 7 October 2013. The line reopened between The Star and Lilyfield on 18 October and for the full length on 30 October. They were the first derailments in the line's history. An investigation attributed the derailments to excessive wheel wear caused by newly replaced track, with inadequate rail lubrication also contributing.

In late September 2021, cracks were discovered in the underframe rotation bump stops of several Urbos 3 trams. After further inspections of two trams, cracking was discovered in each bogie box area, which led to the withdrawal of all Urbos 3 trams from service for inspection in late October. Similar cracking had appeared in Urbos 3 vehicles used by the West Midlands Metro in England 22 months prior. CAF had notified Transport for NSW and ALTRAC of the issue three months prior, but CAF told them that additional inspections were not necessary if the vehicles were operated and maintained according to their design. After the inspections, the cracking was discovered in all twelve trams, prompting Transport Minister Rob Stokes to announce that the line could remain closed for up to eighteen months, with rail replacement buses running instead.

Services resumed in February 2022 using six Alstom Citadis trams transferred from the CBD and South East Light Rail. Originally planned to run a limited frequency between Central and Lilyfield using four Citadis trams, it was instead decided that the whole line would operate with a reduced frequency. Reduced patronage on the CBD and South East Light Rail during the COVID-19 pandemic allowed six Citadis trams to be reassigned to the Inner West line. Minor modifications to the trams, track and platforms were made, including rubber gap fillers on the platforms (needed as the Citadis trams are narrower than the Urbos trams), lower speed limits, and a different wheel profile. Supplemental bus services from Central to The Star and additional ferry services operated too. From August 2022, the Urbos 3 trams were re-entered into service between Central and Lilyfield. Infrastructure modifications in October 2022 enabled Urbos 3 and Citadis trams to operate simultaneously between Lilyfield and Dulwich Hill. All twelve Urbos 3 trams were planned to be operational by late November 2022.

An interim report on the cracking by the Office of Transport Safety Investigations was released in October 2022 and the final report was released in August 2025. The report did not conclusively determine the cause. Transport for NSW blamed weaknesses in welds, whereas CAF blamed collisions between the bogie and underframe caused by excessive speed around tight curves and no transition curves into tight curves.

=== Patronage ===
Initial patronage after opening in 1997 was lower than expected, due to a 20-kilometre-per-hour (12 mph) speed limit on city streets instituted by the City of Sydney, high ticket prices, and a lack of transit signal priority. The opening of the Star City Casino in November 1997 doubled patronage, which was by then about half of what was forecast. Before the Dulwich Hill extension opened, the Inner West Light Rail received about four million passengers per year. A 2010 forecast projected that the Dulwich Hill extension would increase patronage to 7.2 million per year in 2016 and 9.6 million per year in 2026. In 2013, it was estimated that patronage had doubled since the 2011 ticketing changes had taken effect. The opening of the extension to Dulwich Hill led to a surge in patronage, reaching 6.1 million passengers in the 2014–15 financial year. The 2015–16 financial year recorded 9.73 million passengers, well above forecasts, meaning the line was overcrowded during peak periods. A high of almost ten million passengers was reached in 2019. Patronage fell sharply during the COVID-19 pandemic, although the decline was smaller than that experienced by Sydney Trains. The closure of the Bankstown railway line in 2024 for conversion to Sydney Metro boosted patronage on the light rail, especially on weekends. As of 2025, the Inner West Light Rail has an annual patronage of 8,499,867.

L1 Dulwich Hill line annual patronage
Year	Patronage	±%
2016 (Note: July to December 2016)	4,635,351	—
2017	9,527,898	—
2018	9,438,873	−0.93%
2019	9,974,417	+5.67%
2020	4,646,067	−53.42%
2021	3,159,377	−32.00%
2022	4,461,077	+41.20%
2023	6,832,157	+53.15%
2024	8,062,294	+18.01%
2025	8,502,709	+5.46%
