= Glebe and Wentworth Park railway viaducts =

Set of bridges in New South Wales, Australia

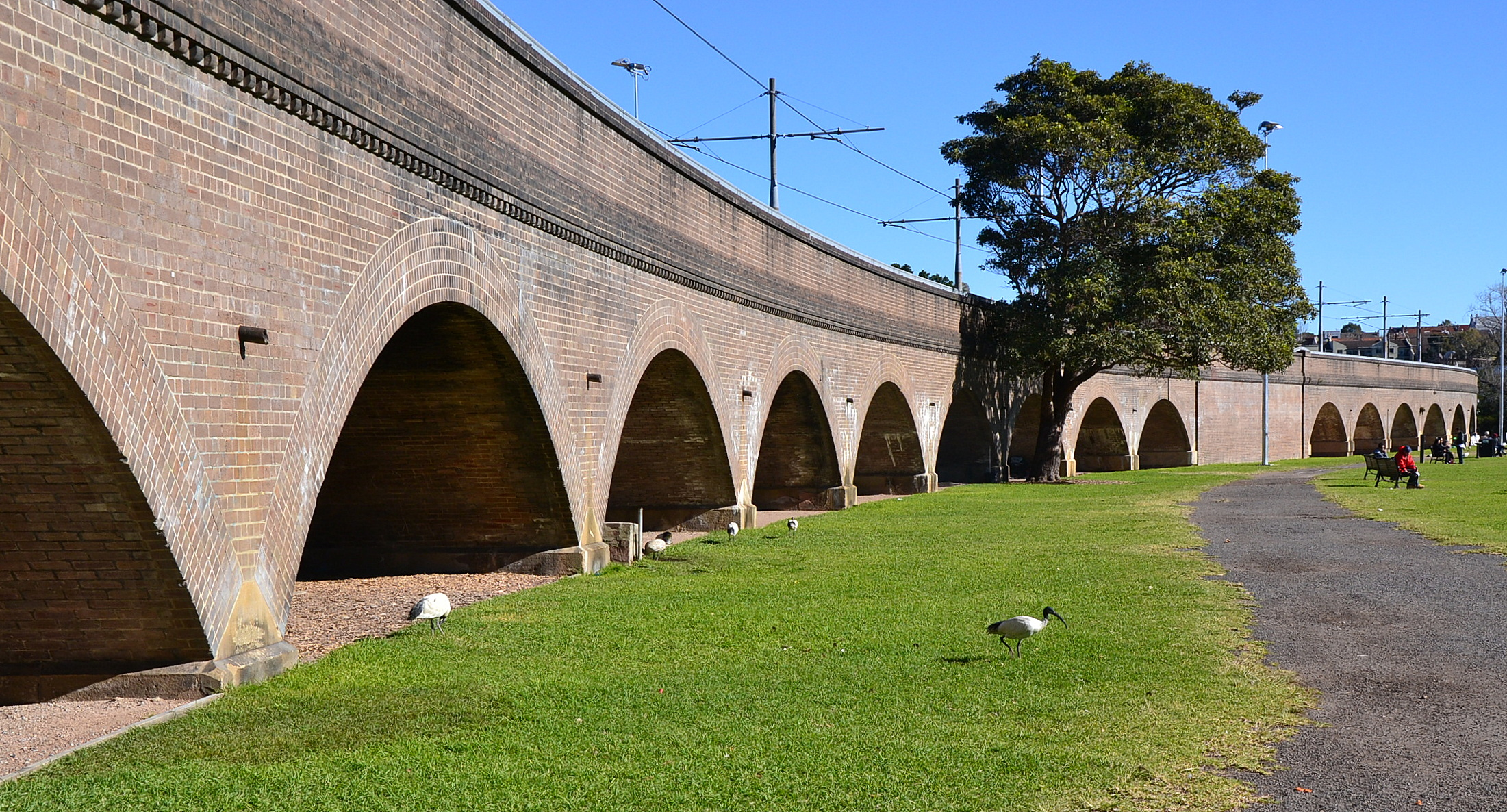
- Wentworth Park railway viaduct
- Coordinates: 33°52′32″S 151°10′40″E
- Carries: Rozelle–Darling Harbour Goods Line (1892–1996); Inner West Light Rail (since 1996)
- Crosses: Wentworth Park; Jubilee Park; Johnstons Creek
- Locale: Glebe, Sydney, New South Wales, Australia
- Begins: Glebe (east)
- Ends: Annandale (west)
- Owner: Transport Asset Manager of New South Wales

Characteristics
- Design: Arch viaduct
- Material: Brick
- Total length: 446.5 metres (1,465 ft): Jubilee Park viaduct; 274 metres (899 ft): Wentworth Park viaduct
- Longest span: 10 metres (33 ft): Jubilee Park viaduct; 11 metres (36 ft): Wentworth Park viaduct
- No. of spans: 28: Jubilee Park viaduct; 21: Wentworth Park viaduct

Rail characteristics
- No. of tracks: 2
- Track gauge: 4 ft 8 1/2 in (1,435 mm) standard gauge
- Electrified: 1996

History
- Contracted lead designer: New South Wales Government Railways
- Construction start: 1892
- Construction end: 1922

New South Wales Heritage Register
- Official name: Glebe and Wentworth Park railway, Viaducts; Wentworth Park Viaduct; Jubilee Park Viaduct; Glebe Viaducts
- Type: State heritage (built)
- Designated: 2 April 1999
- Reference no.: 1034
- Type: Railway Bridge/Viaduct
- Category: Transport – Rail
- Builders: Day labour

Location
- Interactive map of Glebe and Wentworth Park railway viaducts

The Glebe and Wentworth Park railway viaducts are a series of two heritage-listed railway bridges and arch viaducts that carry the Inner West Light Rail across Wentworth Park, Jubilee Park, and Johnstons Creek in the inner western Sydney suburb of Glebe, New South Wales, Australia. They were designed by the New South Wales Government Railways and built from 1892 to 1922 by day labour. They are also known as Wentworth Park Viaduct, Jubilee Park Viaduct and Glebe Viaducts. The viaducts were added to the New South Wales State Heritage Register on 2 April 1999.

Established to initially carry the Rozelle–Darling Harbour Goods Line, the viaducts were converted for use by the Inner West Light Rail in 1996, at the time of their electrification.

== History ==
By 1900, the Sydney metropolitan railway network was fast reaching congestion through the combined, and conflicting, demands of the suburban and country passenger services and the movements of freight trains. Segregated running periods and special timetables were only short-term solutions and did not address the differing traffic requirements.

The decision was made to build a separate rail system for freight trains so they could move independently of the passenger services but could link into the four main lines (north, west, south and Illawarra) at specific locations. Also, a large marshalling yard would be built in the middle of the goods line network (at Enfield) to centralise the interchange of freight traffic.

The completion of the goods line was directly associated with the Sydney Harbour Trust's completion of the Pyrmont (Jones Bay) wharves, which were considered the most up-to-date and advanced in the port, with rail lines running along each of the wharves. The goods line provided a continuous loop connection through Central station Yard, Darling Harbour Yard and the Pyrmont wharves, with connections to Rozelle Yard, White Bay and Glebe Island. In this period, Sydney Harbour was the main port for NSW and the goods line provided a direct connection between rural Australia, growing wheat and wool and mining coal, and the ships carrying the goods to export markets. Imported goods arriving on the docks were back-loaded onto the empty trains for distribution around the state. Work began around 1910 with the goods line from Rozelle to the northern end of Darling Harbour completed and opened for traffic on 23 January 1922.

The construction of brick arch underbridges occurred in two periods: 1892 for the duplication of the Main Southern railway line from Granville to Picton, then from 1914 to 1922 mostly for main line duplications. The former had bricks supplied from private brickworks whereas the latter's supply came from the State Brickworks at Homebush. The construction of the Jubilee Park and Wentworth Park viaducts was the first large-scale project to use bricks from the State Brickworks. Approximately three million four hundred thousand bricks were used for these viaducts. The viaducts were built using timber piles driven into the ground below them, to shore up the structures, as both Parks had been themselves created on land resumed from swamps and sandflats.

Conversion of the goods line to light rail included the installation of new stations and infrastructure such as overhead catenary systems to carry the required electric wiring.

Nearly all the underbridges – a mix of brick arches, steel girders, and steel trusses – on the former Metropolitan Goods Line are still in use.

== Description ==
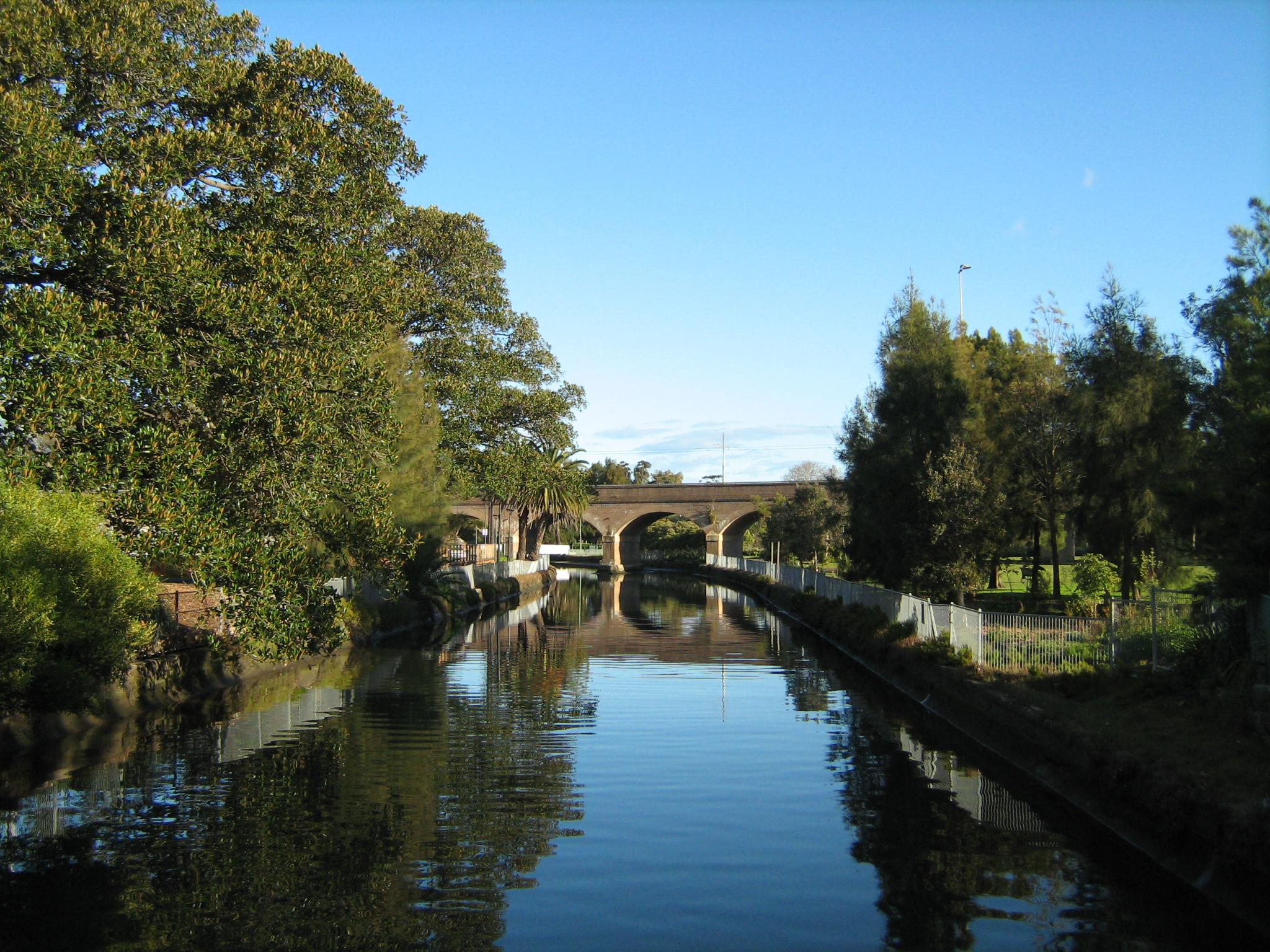
The viaduct over Johnstons Creek, looking upriver, pictured in 2009

=== Jubilee Park viaduct ===
Jubilee Park viaduct is a 28-span brick arch viaduct built on a curve extending from the east of Jubilee Park at Victoria Road to The Crescent, Annandale. The viaduct contains more than two million bricks from the former State Brickworks at Homebush Bay. The bricks are laid in English bond pattern with soldier courses defining the archways. The arches are evenly spaced, being 28 x 10.06-metre (33.0 ft) clear spans. The viaduct stretches approximately 446.5 metres (1,465 ft), making it the largest brick viaduct in the NSW rail system.

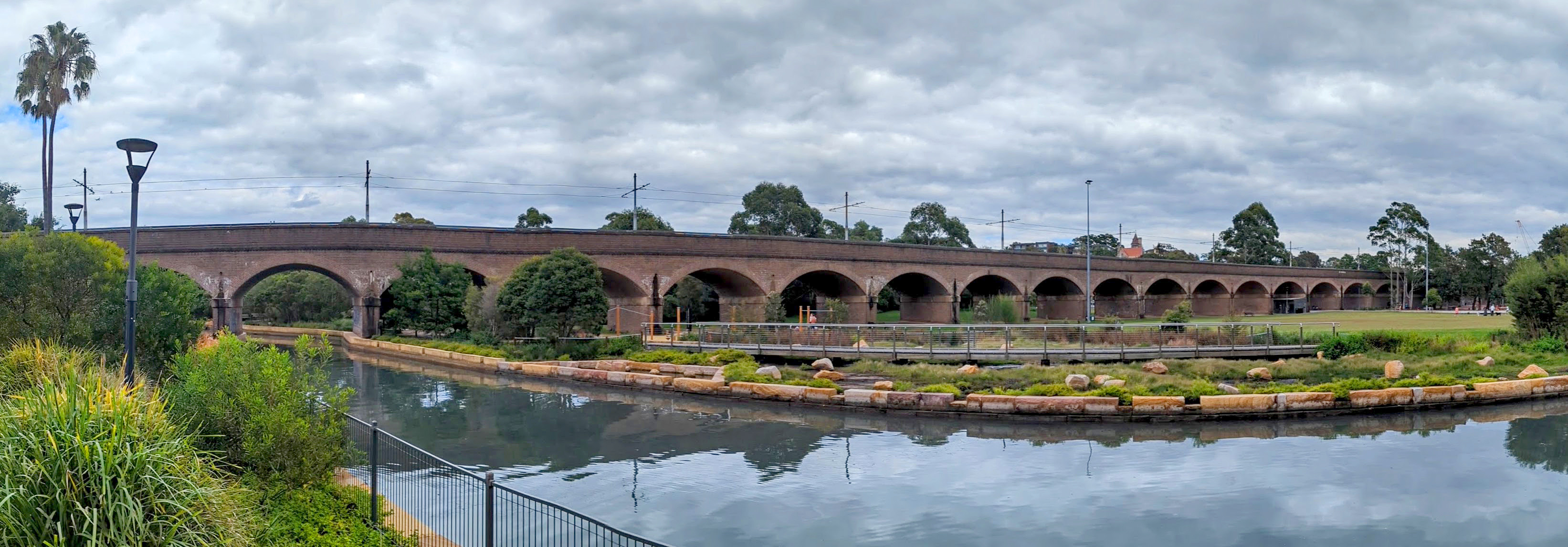
Jubilee Park Viaduct, panoramic view from Jubilee Park, looking across Johnstons Creek and Federal Park
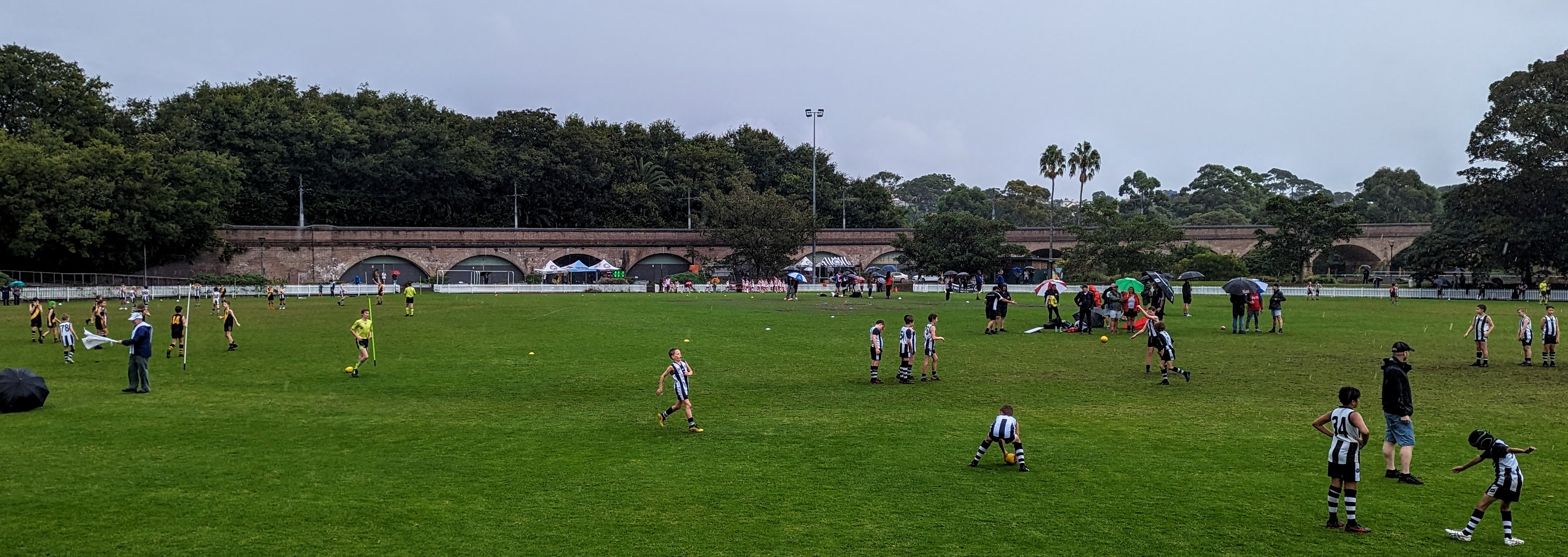
Jubilee Park playing field with another portion of the Jubilee Viaduct in the background

=== Wentworth Park viaduct ===
The Wentworth Park viaduct consists of a long, curved brick arch viaduct of 11 x 10.97-metre (36.0 ft) clear spans and 10 x 11.58-metre (38.0 ft) clear spans. The viaduct is estimated to contain 1.4 million bricks and stretches approximately 274 metres (899 ft) across the park, making it the second longest brick viaduct in the NSW system after the Jubilee Park viaduct which is part of the same line.

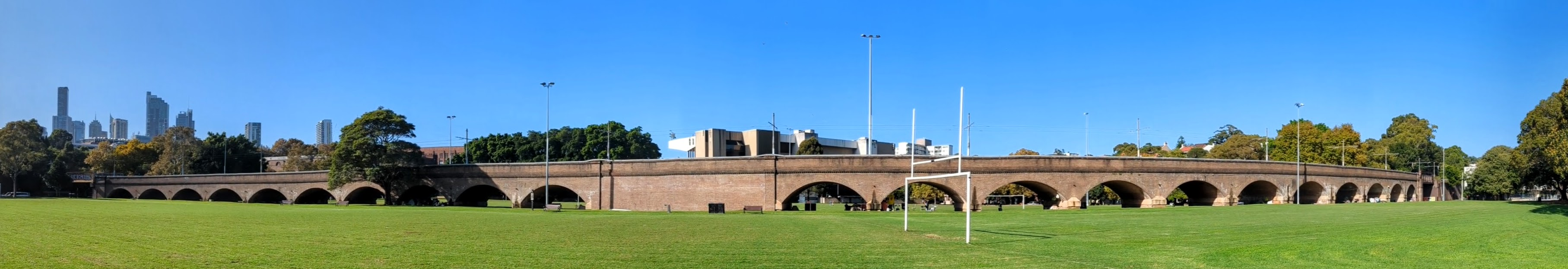
Wentworth Park Viaduct, panoramic view from north of the viaduct in Wentworth Park, Glebe

=== Condition ===
As at 15 May 2023, the viaducts are in good condition. The viaducts retain most original fabric and structure, except for some closed-in arches.

=== Modifications and dates ===
- 1996: Both bridges modified to carry metro light rail network, including addition of overhead electric wires and catenary poles to support them.
- N.d: Some of the Jubilee Park arches closed in as rentable space.

== Heritage listing ==
As at 15 April 2013, the Glebe Viaducts across Jubilee Park and Wentworth Park have state significance as excellent examples of large scale brick arch bridge construction. The 28-span Jubilee Park Viaduct is significant as the longest section of brick arch viaduct on the NSW system. Along with the 21-span Wentworth Park Viaduct, the pair of elegant curved structures are integral parts of the parklands in which they stand and remain as important landmarks along the Glebe foreshore. The structures are both major engineering works and are historically significant as important elements in the development of the Darling Harbour Goods Line in the early 20th century, and as one of the first major infrastructure projects to use bricks from the State Brickworks at Homebush, with more than 3 million bricks used in their construction.

Glebe and Wentworth Park railway, Viaducts was listed on the New South Wales State Heritage Register on 2 April 1999 having satisfied the following criteria.

The place is important in demonstrating the course, or pattern, of cultural or natural history in New South Wales.

The Glebe Viaducts are of state historical significance as integral components of the separate railway network (1910–22) constructed to allow freight trains to traverse the metropolitan area independent of the passenger train network which was one of the most significant and effective railway projects in New South Wales during the twentieth century. The Glebe Viaducts across both Jubilee and Wentworth Park was one of the first projects to use bricks from the State Brickworks at Homebush on a large scale, using more than three million bricks for their construction.

The place is important in demonstrating aesthetic characteristics and/or a high degree of creative or technical achievement in New South Wales.

The Glebe Viaducts (Jubilee Park/Wentworth Park) is an imposing curved structure across parklands whereby its brickwork complements the natural environment. The two sections of the viaduct are major landmark features in the urban landscape and one of the most recognisable industrial features in inner-city Sydney. The viaduct has technical significance due to its scale and construction methods, including the use of timber pilings to add a support structure in regards to the reclaimed land that it was built across. The 28-span Jubilee Park Viaduct is of technical significance as the longest section of brick arch viaduct on the NSW system and the largest viaduct structure to survive. Along with the 21-span Wentworth Park Viaduct, the pair form two significant major engineering works and are excellent examples of brick arch construction.

The place has a strong or special association with a particular community or cultural group in New South Wales for social, cultural or spiritual reasons.

The place has the potential to contribute to the local community's sense of place and can provide a connection to the local community's history.

The place possesses uncommon, rare or endangered aspects of the cultural or natural history of New South Wales.

The Glebe Viaducts (Jubilee Park/Wentworth Park) are rare as the two viaducts form the longest pair of brick arch viaducts in the NSW rail system.

The place is important in demonstrating the principal characteristics of a class of cultural or natural places/environments in New South Wales.

The Glebe Viaducts (Jubilee Park/Wentworth Park) are an excellent representative of brick arch construction and compares to the brick arch viaduct on the Lavender Bay railway line.

== See also ==
- Pyrmont and Glebe railway tunnels
