= Rozelle–Darling Harbour Goods Line =

Former goods railway line in Sydney, New South Wales, Australia

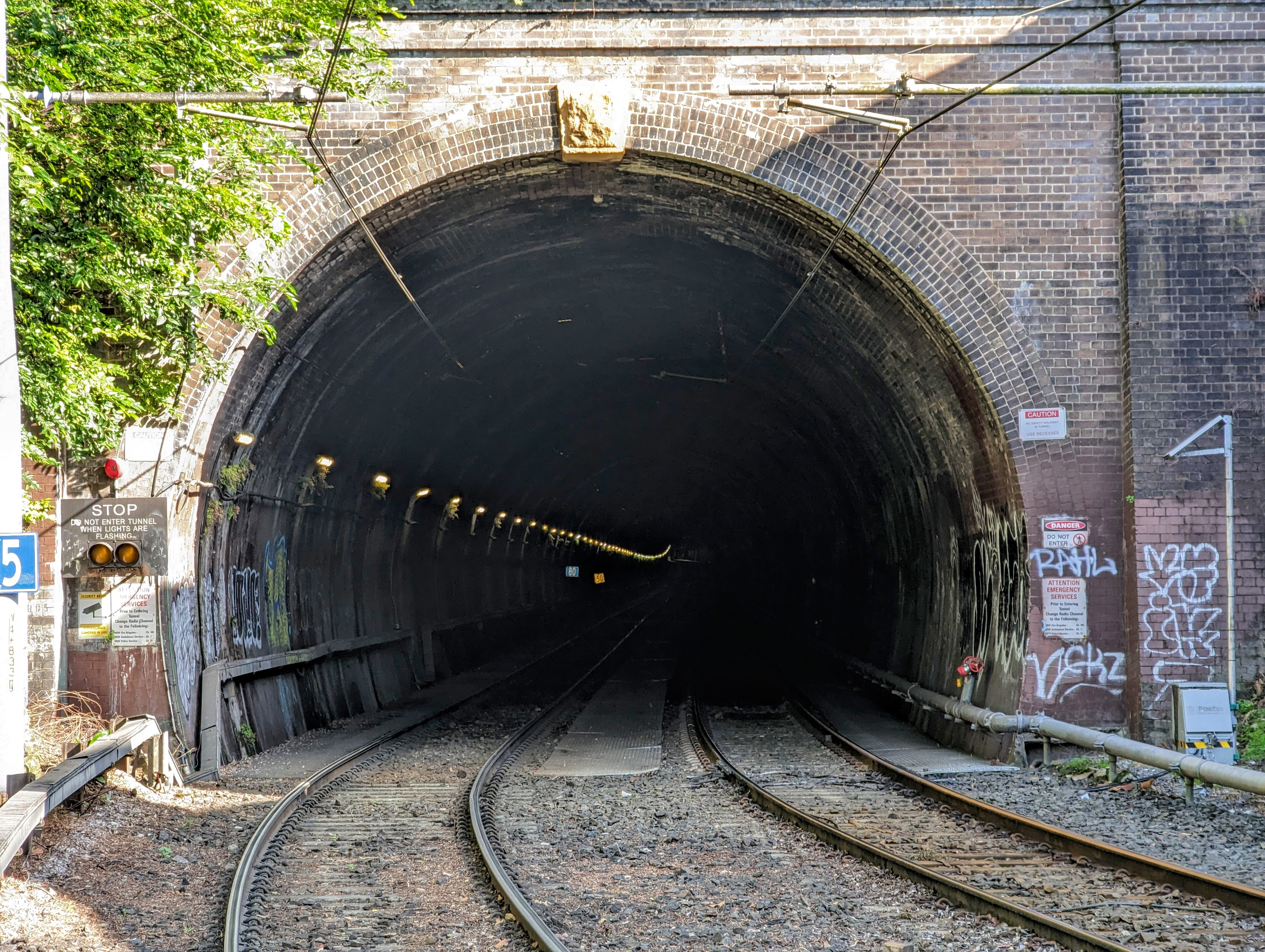
- Glebe railway tunnel

Overview
- Status: Open; Sydney Yard – Regent Street; Closed; Sydney Yard – Ultimo; Rozelle Yard – White Bay; Pedestrianised; Ultimo – Darling Harbour; Light rail Darling Harbour – Dulwich Hill
- Locale: Sydney, New South Wales, Australia
- Termini: Sydney Yard; Dulwich Hill

Service
- Type: Heavy rail, light rail

History
- Opened: 1855 Sydney Yard – Darling Harbour; 1922 Darling Harbour – Dulwich Hill
- Closed: 1996 Ultimo – Lilyfield c. 2005 Ultimo – Sydney Yard; 2009 Lilyfield – Dulwich Hill
- Light rail: 1997 Darling Harbour – Wentworth Park; 2000 Wentworth Park – Lilyfield; 2014 Lilyfield – Dulwich Hill

Technical
- Track gauge: 1,435 mm (4 ft 8 1/2 in) standard gauge
- Electrification: 1500 V DC overhead catenary to Regent Street; See: Inner West Light Rail
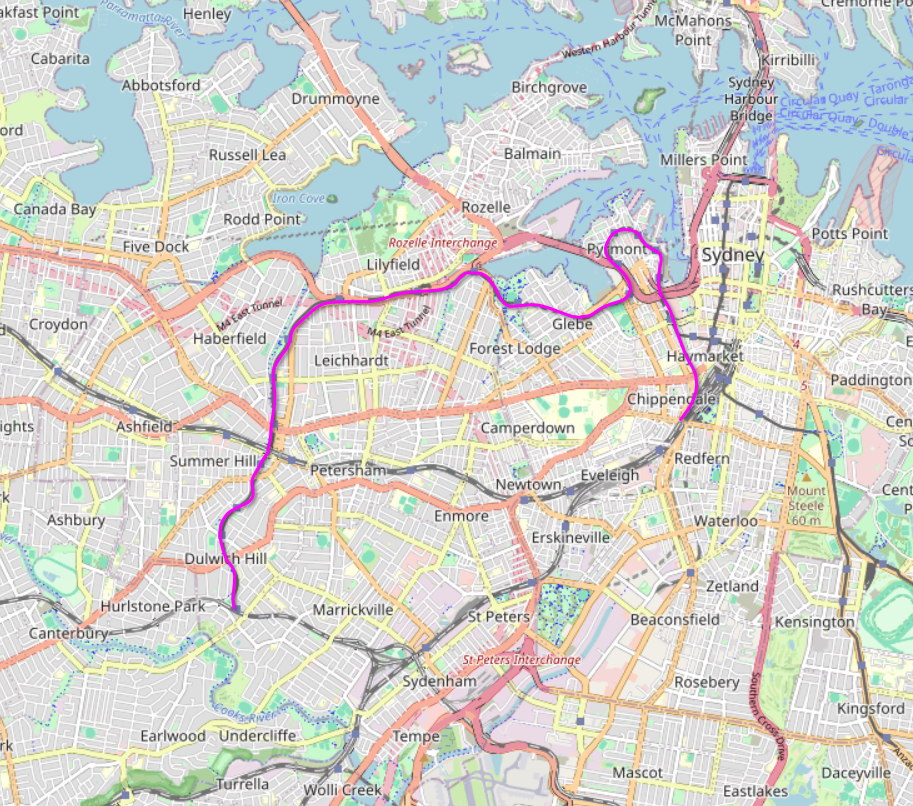
- Map of suburban Sydney with the full Rozelle line highlighted

The Rozelle–Darling Harbour Goods Line is a railway line in Sydney, New South Wales, Australia, which was previously part of the city's goods railway network. It was mostly subsumed by the Inner West Light Rail; the remaining section became a pedestrian pathway, while a short spur connects Sydney Yard to Regent Street station.

Besides Regent Street, the line has several other significant pieces of infrastructure, including respectively the oldest structure and the longest brick arch viaduct on the New South Wales railways.

== Line description ==
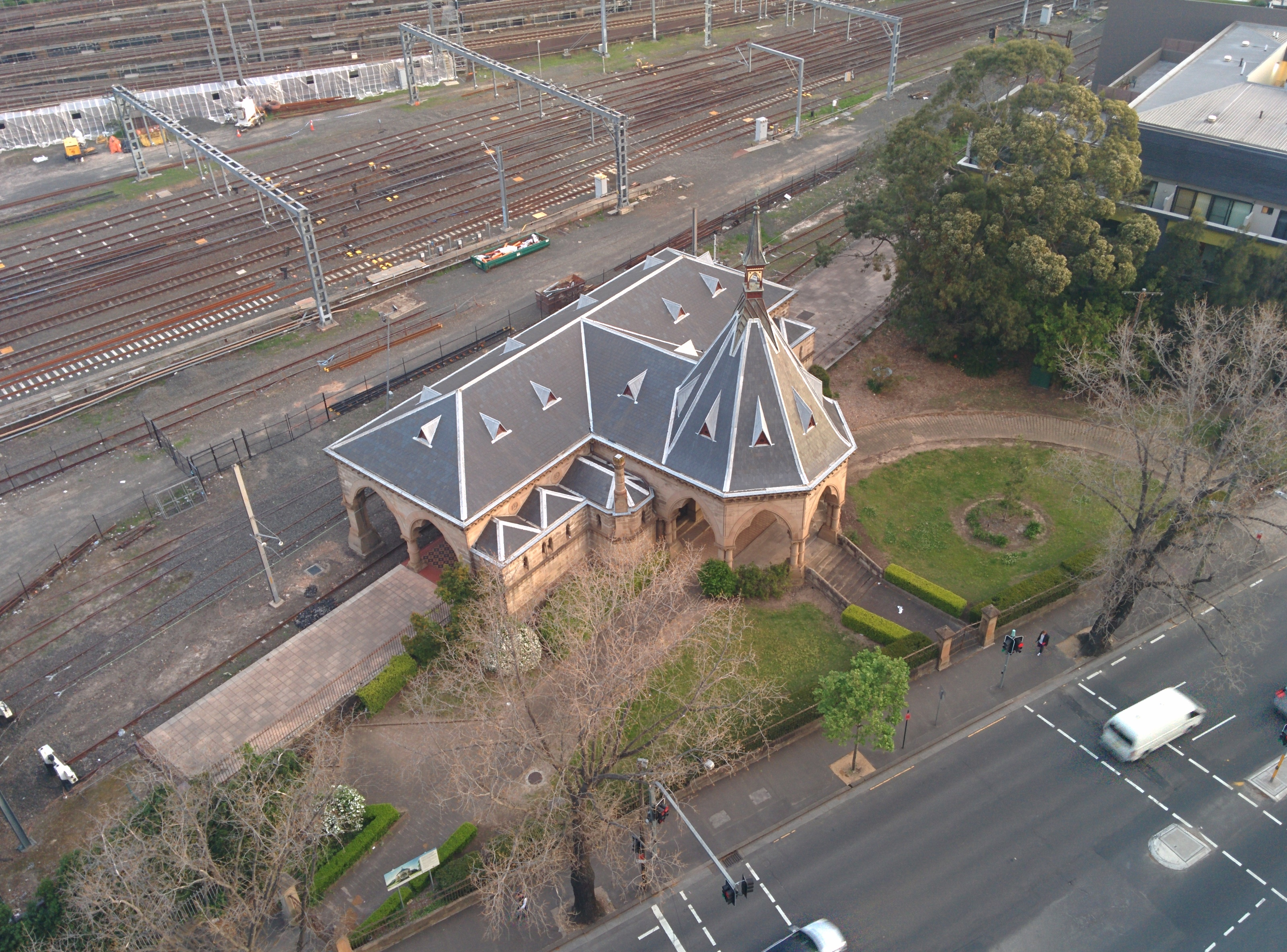
Regent Street station next to Sydney Yard; the non-electrified track which goes down under the Railway Square road overbridge can be seen

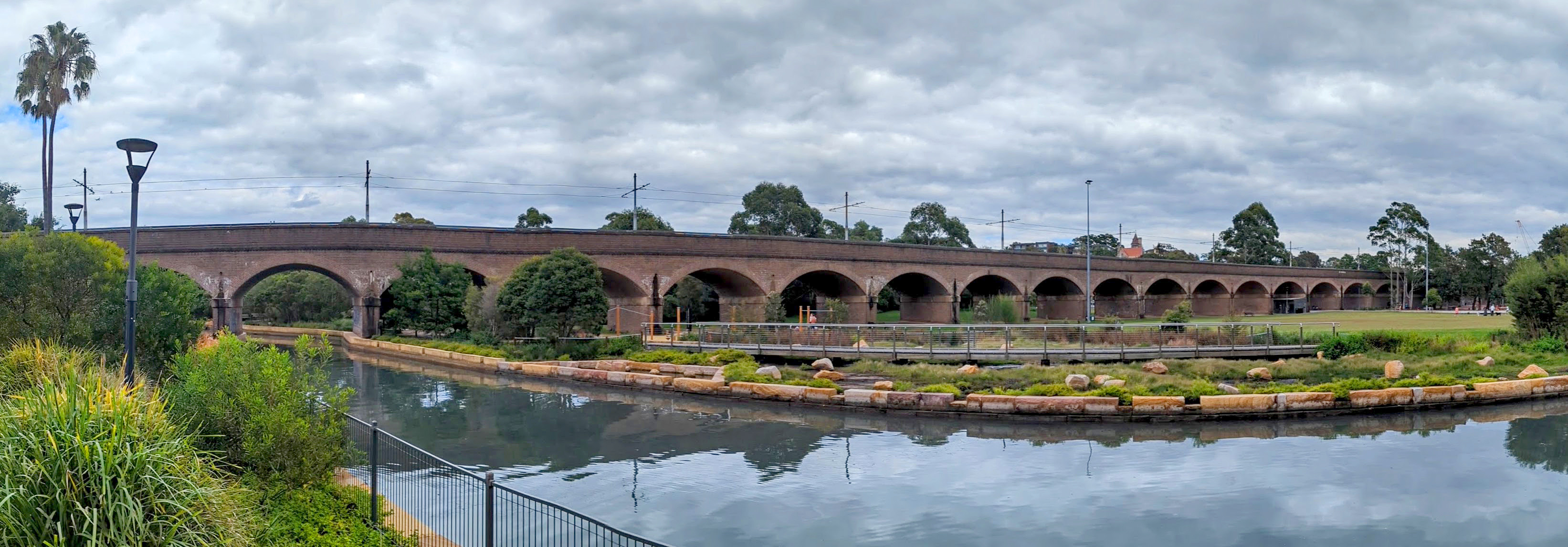
Jubilee Park viaduct

The line terminates at the Central Goods Junction in Sydney Yard. An electrified track branches off the line to Regent Street station; this track remains open. The line ran under the Railway Square road overbridge – the oldest surviving structure on the New South Wales railways – and over the Ultimo Road railway underbridge to Darling Harbour Yard. From Darling Harbour, the line runs to Pyrmont.

The heritage-listed Pyrmont and Glebe railway tunnels, built in 1922, continue to carry the light rail on opposite sides of the Wentworth Park viaduct. The railway cutting through Pyrmont goes from the commencement of Jones Bay Road, where the line deviated from the subsequently-removed wharf sidings, through the current location of the John Street Square light rail stop. Approaching the stop, the line passes through a short tunnel under Harris Street. After the station it enters a larger tunnel near John Street opposite Mount Street. The tunnel exits near Jones Street at Saunders Lane and the line continues in a cutting which progressively opens out on the western side before falling ground levels bring the line on to a viaduct – the Wentworth Park viaduct – near where Jones and Allen Streets intersected before the railway was built. This viaduct continues across Wentworth Park towards Glebe. The Glebe railway tunnel runs approximately 800 metres (2,600 ft) from Lower Avon Street, Glebe (adjacent to the Glebe stop) to Jubilee Park.

The Glebe and Wentworth Park railway viaducts, consisting of the aforementioned Wentworth Park viaduct and the Jubilee Park viaduct, are likewise heritage listed. The Jubilee Park viaduct extends from the east of Jubilee Park at Victoria Road to The Crescent, Annandale. The viaduct stretches 446.5 metres (1,465 ft), making it the largest brick viaduct on the New South Wales railways.

The line featured another major yard in Rozelle, on the site of which now exists a light rail depot. A branch line from Rozelle Yard served the White Bay Power Station and White Bay.

The Mungo Scott Sidings served the Mungo Scott Flour Mill in Summer Hill.

With conversion to light rail, the line was truncated at Dulwich Hill, though it previously connected there through to the rest of the Sydney goods network through the triangular Wardell Road Junction.

== History ==
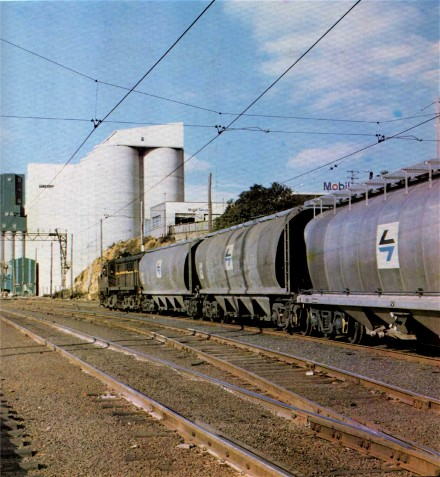
The former Rozelle Yard

From the time when the Sydney Railway Company was formed in 1848, it had been the intention of the company to build a freight terminal at Darling Harbour. To this end, a railway line was constructed between the Sydney railway station (the predecessor to Central railway station) and Darling Harbour, which opened on 26 September 1855.

By 1908, goods traffic on the line to Darling Harbour and the neighbouring suburban lines had become excessive, with 592 wagons arriving each day and 512 being dispatched. It was decided to construct separate goods lines from Sefton to Darling Harbour via Enfield, Dulwich Hill and Rozelle, with extensions to Botany and the State Abattoirs at Homebush Bay. The initial scheme, approved by the Parliamentary Committee on Public Works, approved the initial line from Dulwich Hill to Darling Harbour. To avoid an opening rail bridge alongside the existing Glebe Island Bridge, a circuitous route was built around Rozelle Bay through the suburb of Pyrmont. The proposal was approved on 23 November 1914, and the line opened on 23 January 1922.

Initial traffic was spoil for the construction of the Main Suburban line between Sydney and Parramatta, then for the carriage of departmental coke for steam engines, and a small amount of timber from 1860. Initial reports of the traffic on the line suggested that freight revenue amounted to only £20 a year, and there was only 60 tonnes of coke carriage a week.

=== Light rail ===
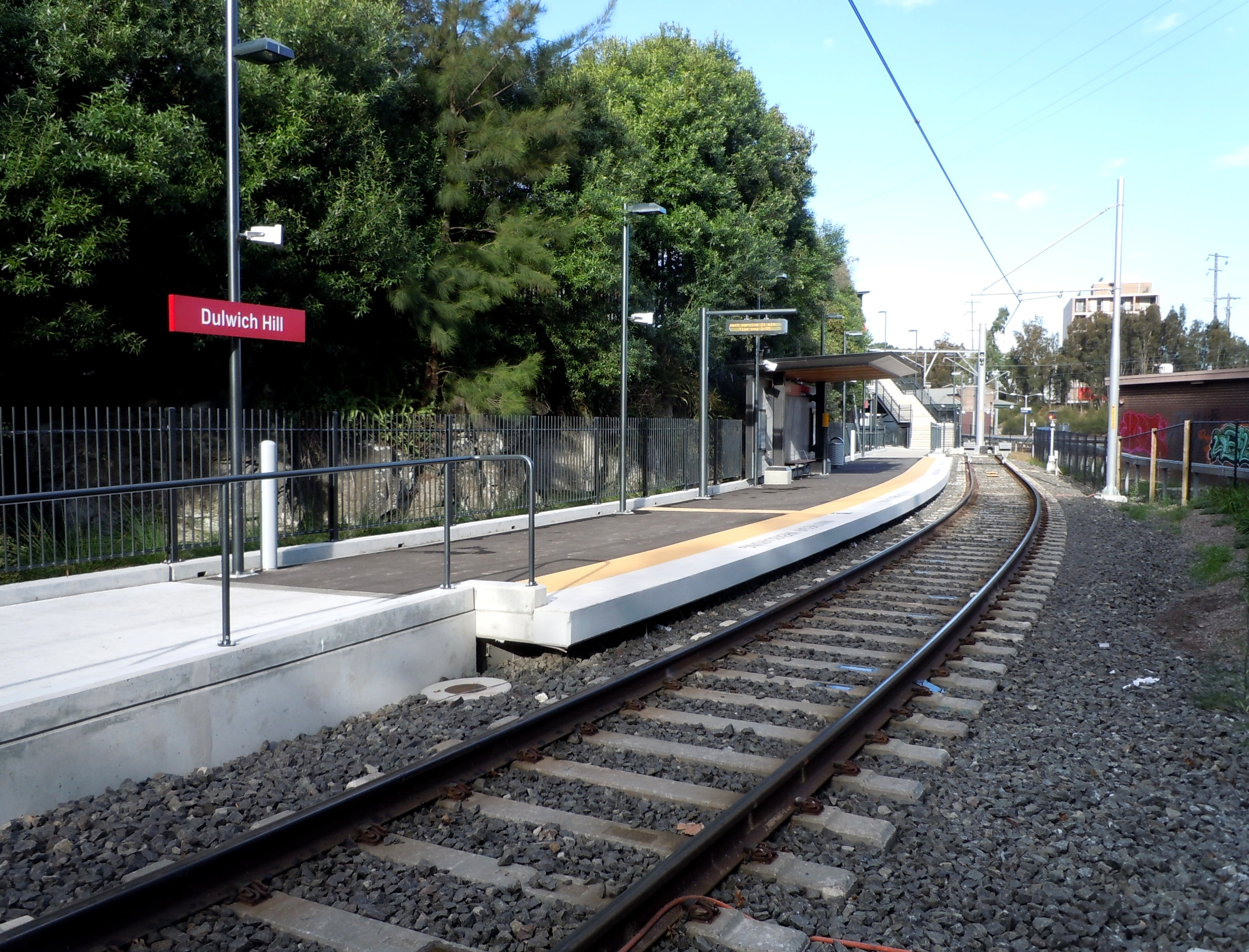
The light rail platform at Dulwich Hill station. The line used to connect here to the rest of the metropolitan goods network.

The Sydney Light Rail Company was established in 1994 and, in January 1996, the Lilyfield to Ultimo section of the line closed; the line from Sydney Yard to Ultimo was retained for the use by the Powerhouse Museum. The alignment was reutilised for light rail which opened from Central to Wentworth Park in August 1997 and was extended to Lilyfield in August 2000. When the light rail was initially conceived, grain was still being transported along the line to Pyrmont, and so planning was undertaken with the presumption that this would continue.

Goods traffic on the heavy rail section from Dulwich Hill to Rozelle Yard ceased in 2009. This section, from Dulwich Hill to Lilyfield, was subsequently converted to light rail, reopening as such in 2014.

=== Pedestrian path ===
The section of line from Sydney Yard to the Powerhouse Museum closed c. 2005. A section of the corridor from the northern end of the Devonshire Street Tunnel to Ultimo Road was developed into a pedestrian pathway and was originally called the Ultimo Pedestrian Network until it was renamed The Goods Line in 2012. Plans were then announced to expand the pathway through to Hay Street; this second section opened on 30 August 2015.
