= Darling Harbour Yard =

Former railway yard in Sydney, New South Wales, Australia

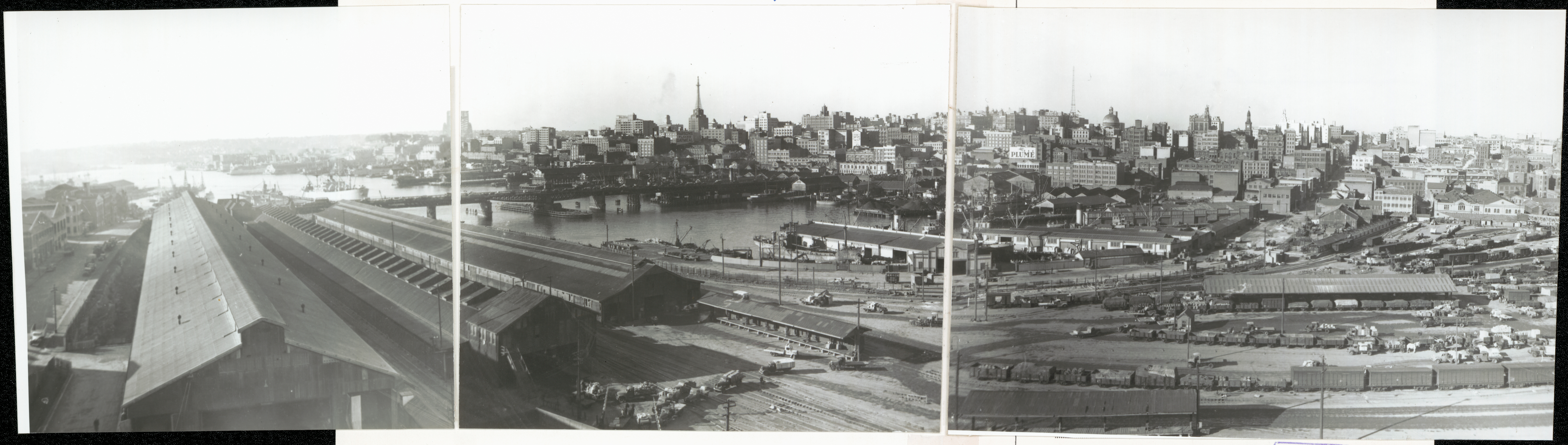
- Interactive map of Darling Harbour Yard

Location
- Location: Darling Harbour
- Coordinates: 33.8734°S 151.1996°E

Characteristics
- Owner: State Rail Authority
- Operator: State Rail Authority; Public Transport Commission; New South Wales Government Railways
- Type: Freight

History
- Opened: c. 1856
- Closed: 6 June 1993

Darling Harbour Yard was a goods railway yard in Darling Harbour, New South Wales, Australia. The yard was once the origin of all outgoing goods traffic from Sydney. It was one of two major yards on the former Metropolitan Goods line, the other being in Rozelle. After closing to heavy rail in 1993, the alignment of the Rozelle–Darling Harbour Goods Line which passed through it was reutilised by light rail. The precinct around the yard was significantly redeveloped in the decades following its closure.

== History ==
From the time when the Sydney Railway Company was formed in 1848, it had been the intention of the company to build a freight terminal at Darling Harbour. To this end, a railway line was constructed between the Sydney railway station (the predecessor to Central railway station) and Darling Harbour, which opened on 26 September 1855.

This line was extended to Dulwich Hill via the John Street tunnel, the Glebe tunnel, and Lilyfield in 1922.

=== Redevelopment ===
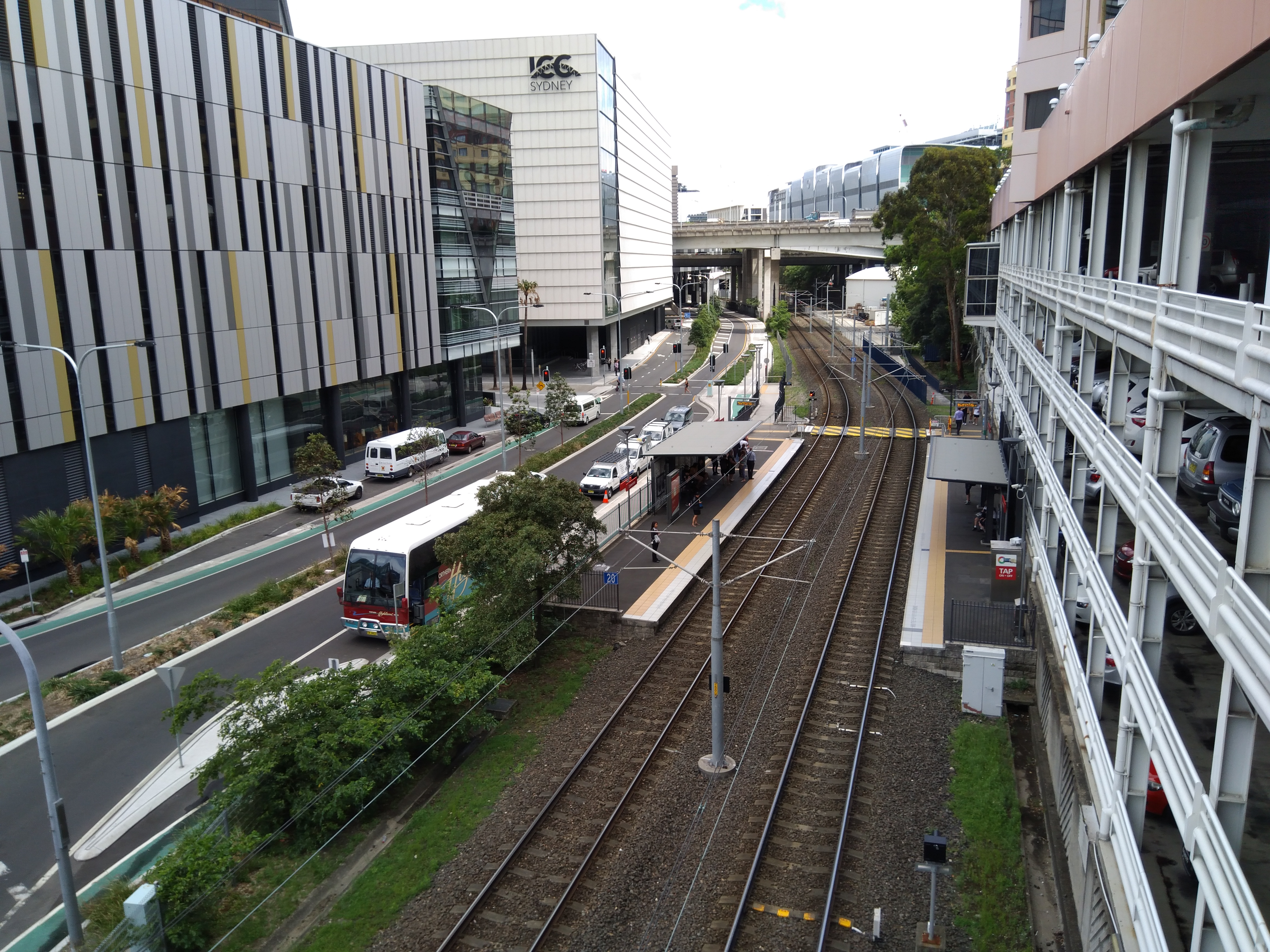
Convention light rail stop in Darling Harbour

The Darling Harbour Authority was established in 1984, with the goal of redeveloping the Darling Harbour precinct. The yard was demolished and redeveloped between 1985 and 1988, with a single line of track retained.

In January 1996, the Lilyfield to Darling Harbour section of the line closed. It was subsequently reutilised by the Inner West Light Rail that opened to Wentworth Park in August 1997 and was extended to Lilyfield in August 2000, and on to Dulwich Hill in March 2014. The Sydney Monorail ran adjacent to the light rail between Convention and Exhibition stations.

The Goods Line, a pedestrian and cyclist pathway linking Ultimo and Darling Harbour, is situated on a section of the line that was closed.

== Gallery ==
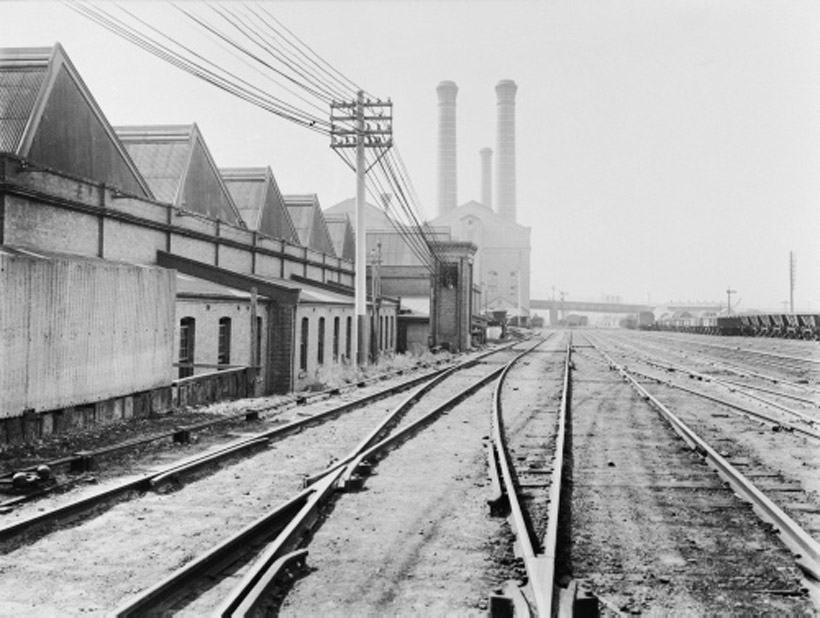
The western end of the yard, with the Ultimo Tram Depot and Ultimo Power Station also in view

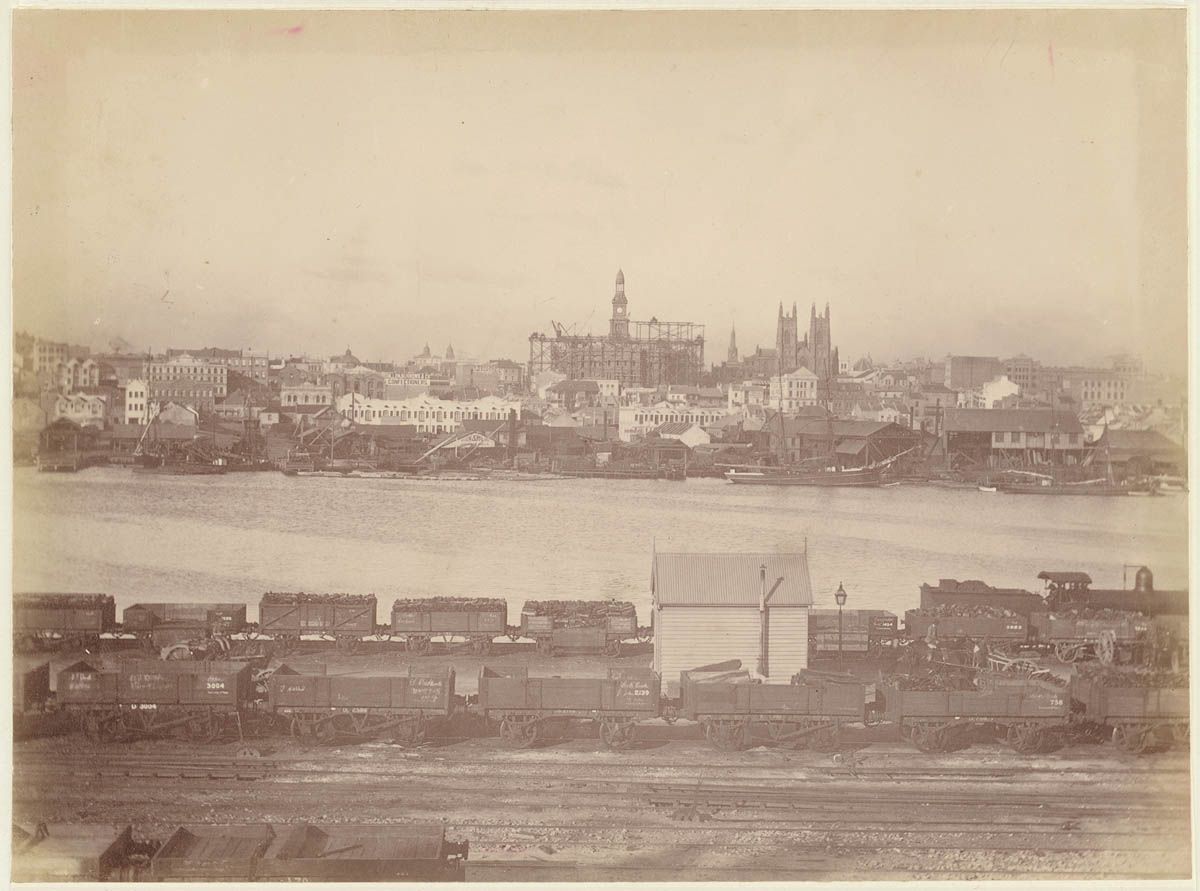
Looking towards the CBD in the 1880s

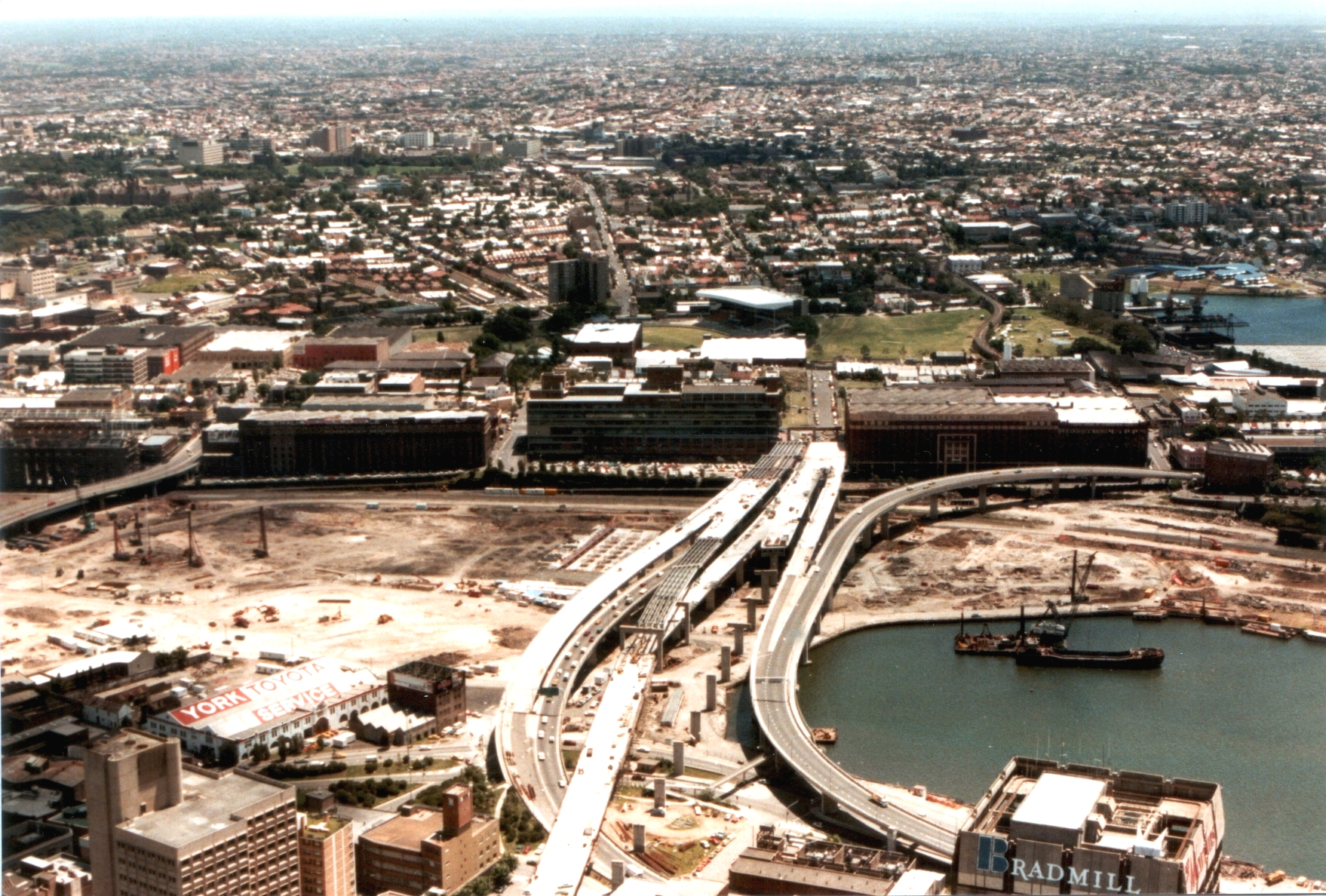
Construction of the Western Distributor in the early 1980s
