= Rozelle Yard =

Former railway yard in Sydney, New South Wales, Australia

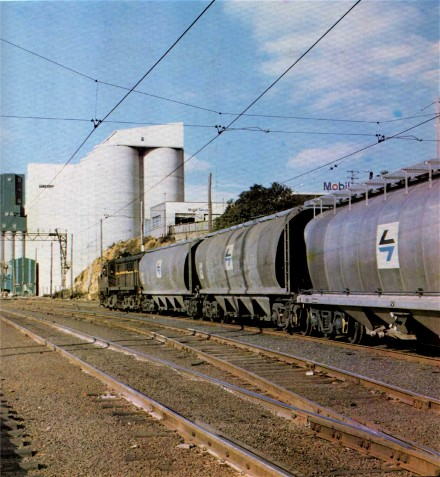
- A grain train at Rozelle Yard in 1977
- Interactive map of Rozelle Yard

Location
- Location: Rozelle
- Coordinates: 33°52′13″S 151°10′21″E

Characteristics
- Owner: RailCorp
- Operator: Pacific National; FreightCorp; State Rail Authority; Public Transport Commission; New South Wales Government Railways
- Type: Freight

History
- Opened: 23 January 1922
- Closed: 2009

Rozelle Yard was a goods railway yard in Rozelle, New South Wales, Australia. It was one of two major yards on the Rozelle–Darling Harbour Goods Line, the other being in Darling Harbour. After heavy rail traffic ceased, part of the site was redeveloped into the Lilyfield Maintenance Depot of Sydney Light Rail. Other parts of the former yard were redeveloped into Rozelle Interchange and the Rozelle Parklands.

== History ==
By 1908, goods traffic on the line to Darling Harbour and the neighbouring suburban lines had become excessive, with 592 wagons arriving each day and 512 being dispatched. It was decided to construct the Metropolitan Goods line from Sefton to Darling Harbour via Enfield, Dulwich Hill and Rozelle, with extensions to Botany and the State Abattoirs at Homebush Bay. The initial scheme, approved by the Parliamentary Committee on Public Works, approved the initial line from Dulwich Hill to Darling Harbour. To avoid an opening rail bridge alongside the existing Glebe Island Bridge, a circuitous route was built around Rozelle Bay through Pyrmont. The proposal, which included two tunnels under Pyrmont and Glebe, was approved on 23 November 1914, and the line opened on 23 January 1922. A branch line from the yard served the White Bay Power Station and White Bay. The yard was electrified in September 1967.

In January 1996, the Lilyfield to Central section of the Metropolitan Goods line closed. Much of the alignment was reutilised by the Inner West Light Rail that opened to Wentworth Park in August 1997 and was extended to Lilyfield in August 2000. The stop serving Lilyfield was built adjacent to the rail yards. The yard saw a considerable decline in traffic throughout the 2000s, becoming overgrown and being used only intermittently for storage of disused passenger and freight carriages. Traffic on the line ceased in 2009 and the yard fell out of use.

=== Redevelopment ===
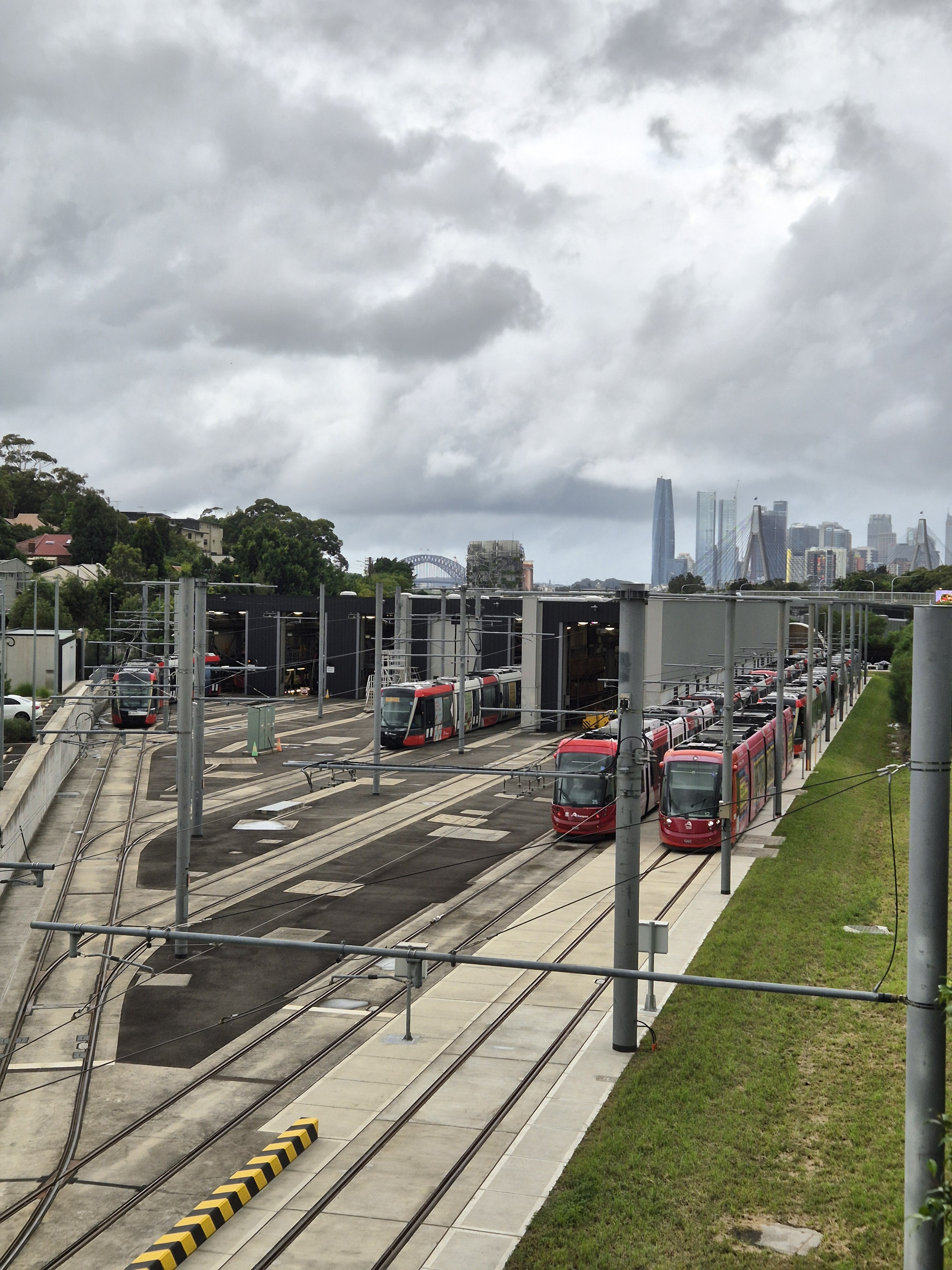
Lilyfield Maintenance Depot

In February 2010, following the cessation of goods traffic the previous year, the Keneally Government announced a 5.6-kilometre (3.5 mi) extension of the light rail from Lilyfield to Dulwich Hill. The Lilyfield Maintenance Depot was built to the west of the Lilyfield station for maintenance and stabling. A second platform was added at Lilyfield for services towards Dulwich Hill. The Dulwich Hill extension opened in 2014.

A maintenance depot was constructed next to the station on the site of the yard. Part of the yard was utilised by the WestConnex M4-M5 Link and the Rozelle Interchange. As a result of the renewal works, the precinct now includes ten hectares of green space featuring smokestacks, sports fields and recreational facilities. The Rozelle Parklands were opened on 17 December 2023.

== Gallery ==
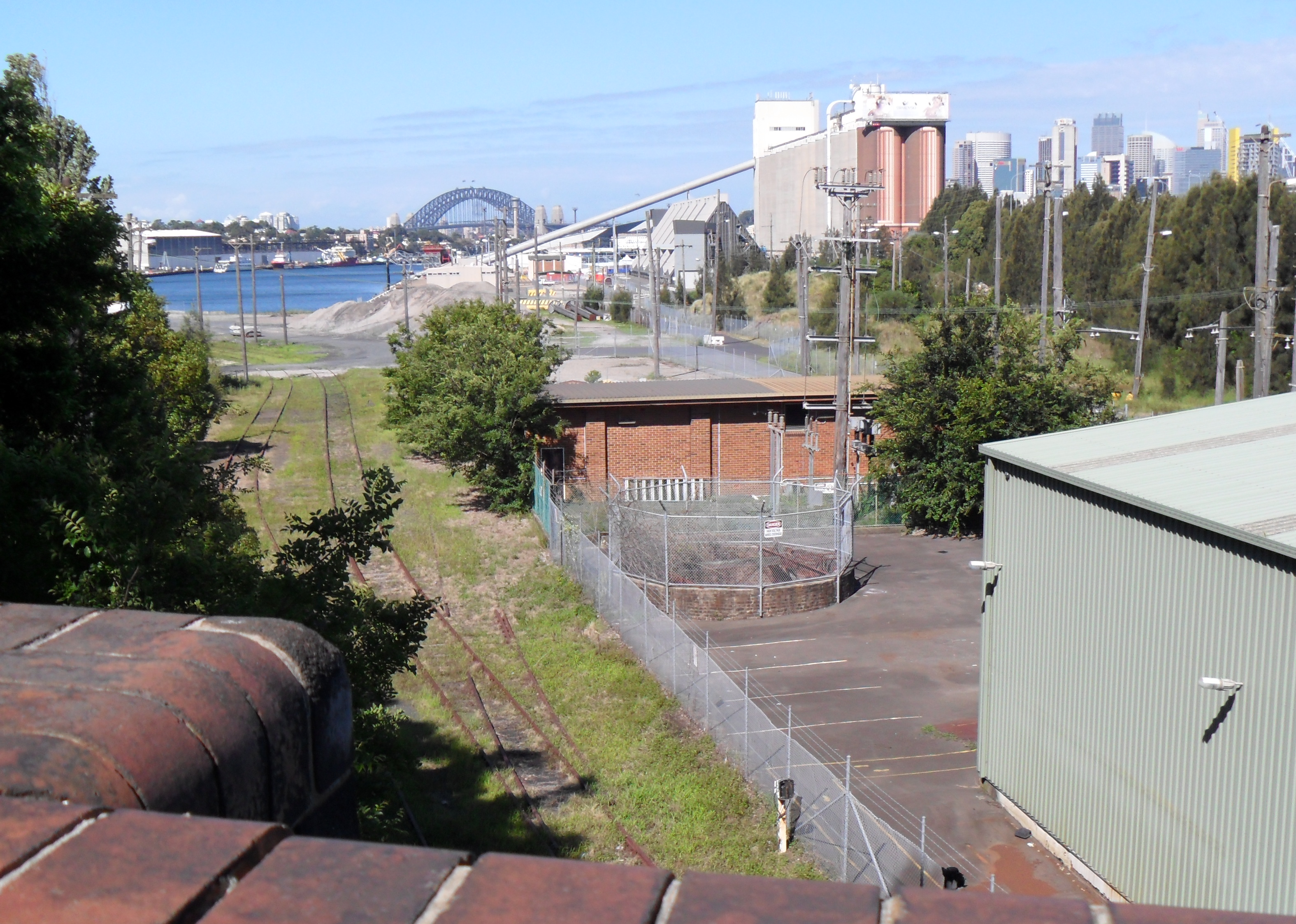
The branch line to White Bay Power Station from Victoria Road in 2011

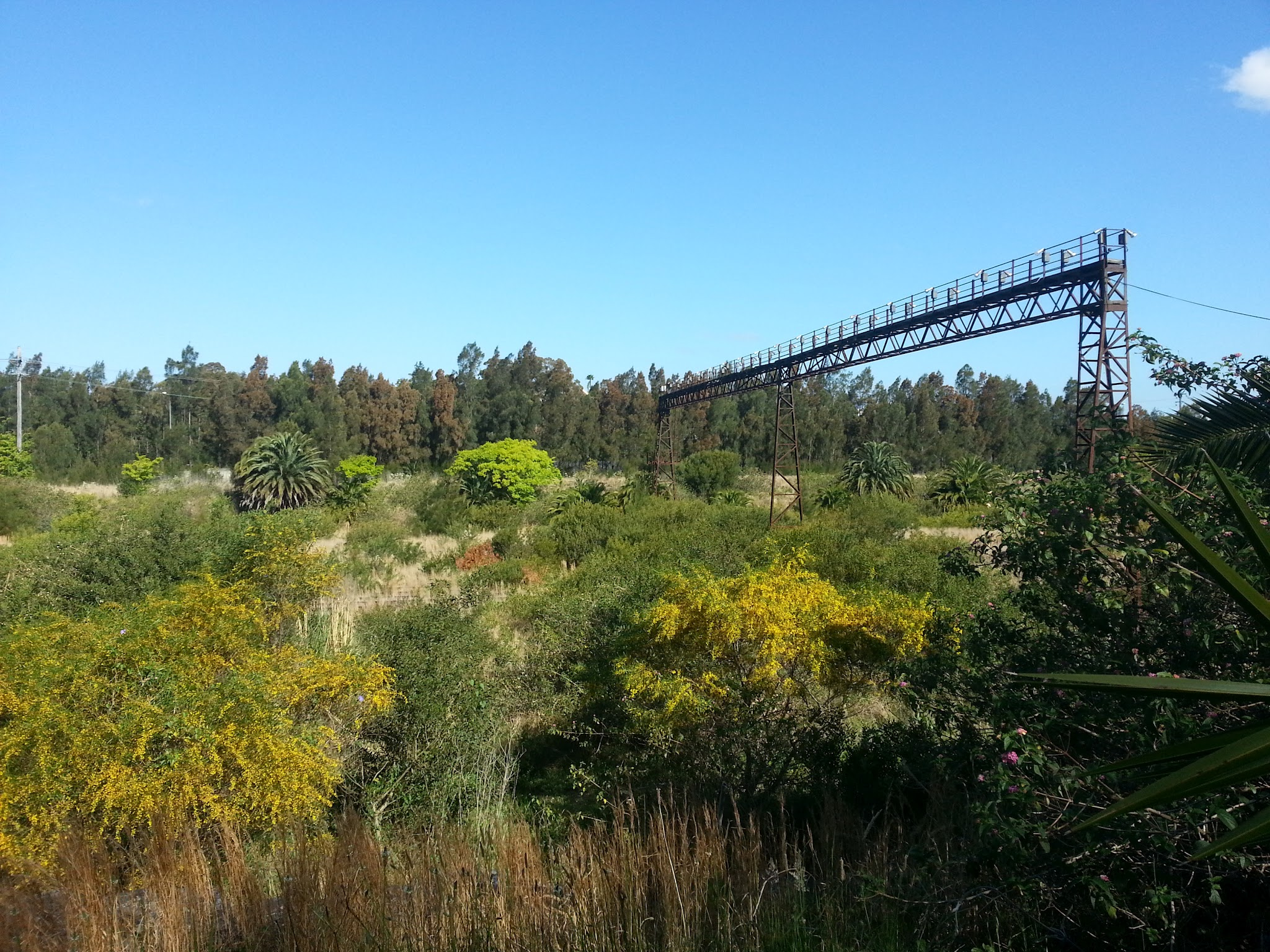
The yard in 2012. The disused alignment had become severely overgrown

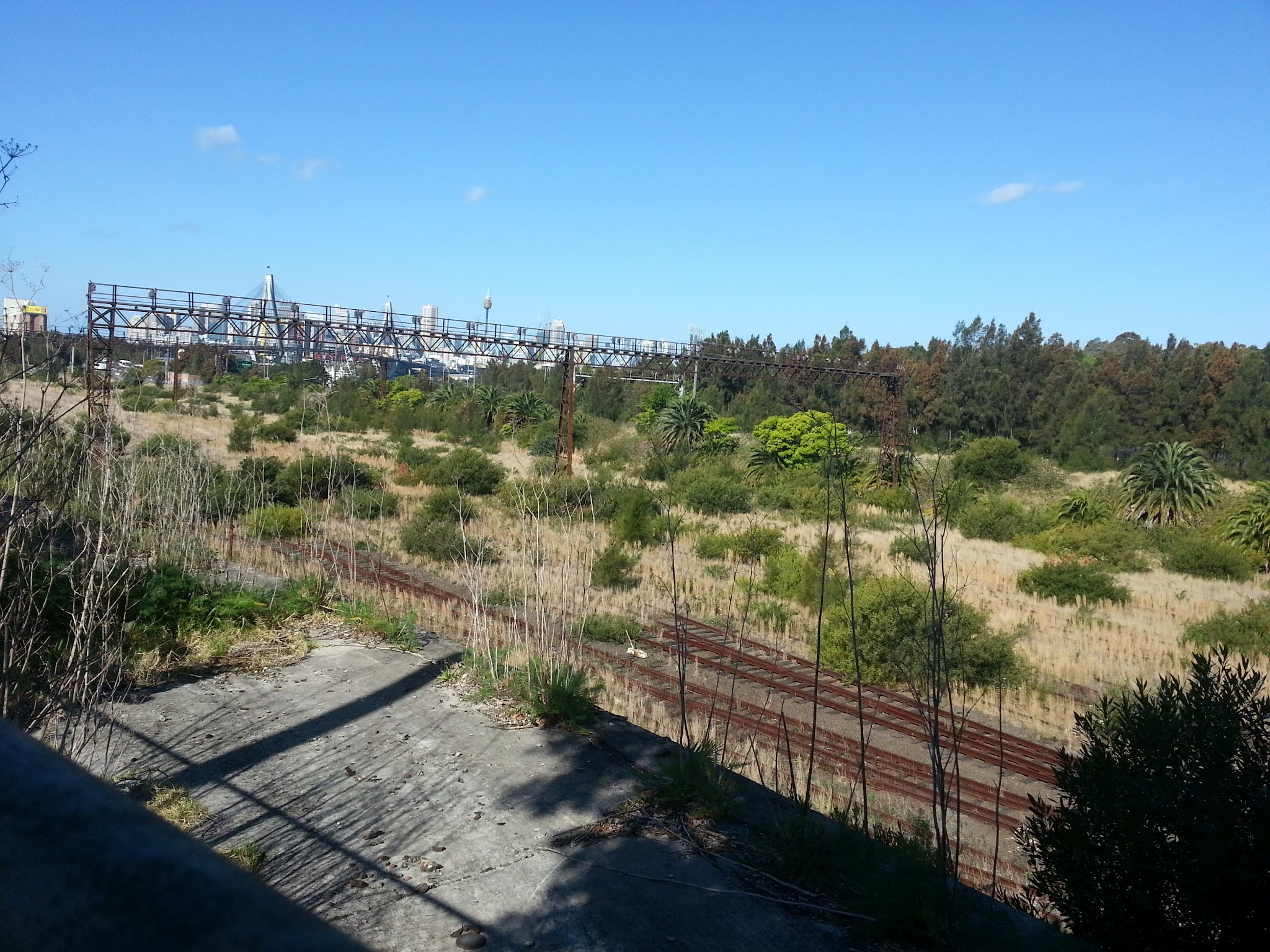
Another shot of the disused yard in 2012 viewed from Lilyfield Road

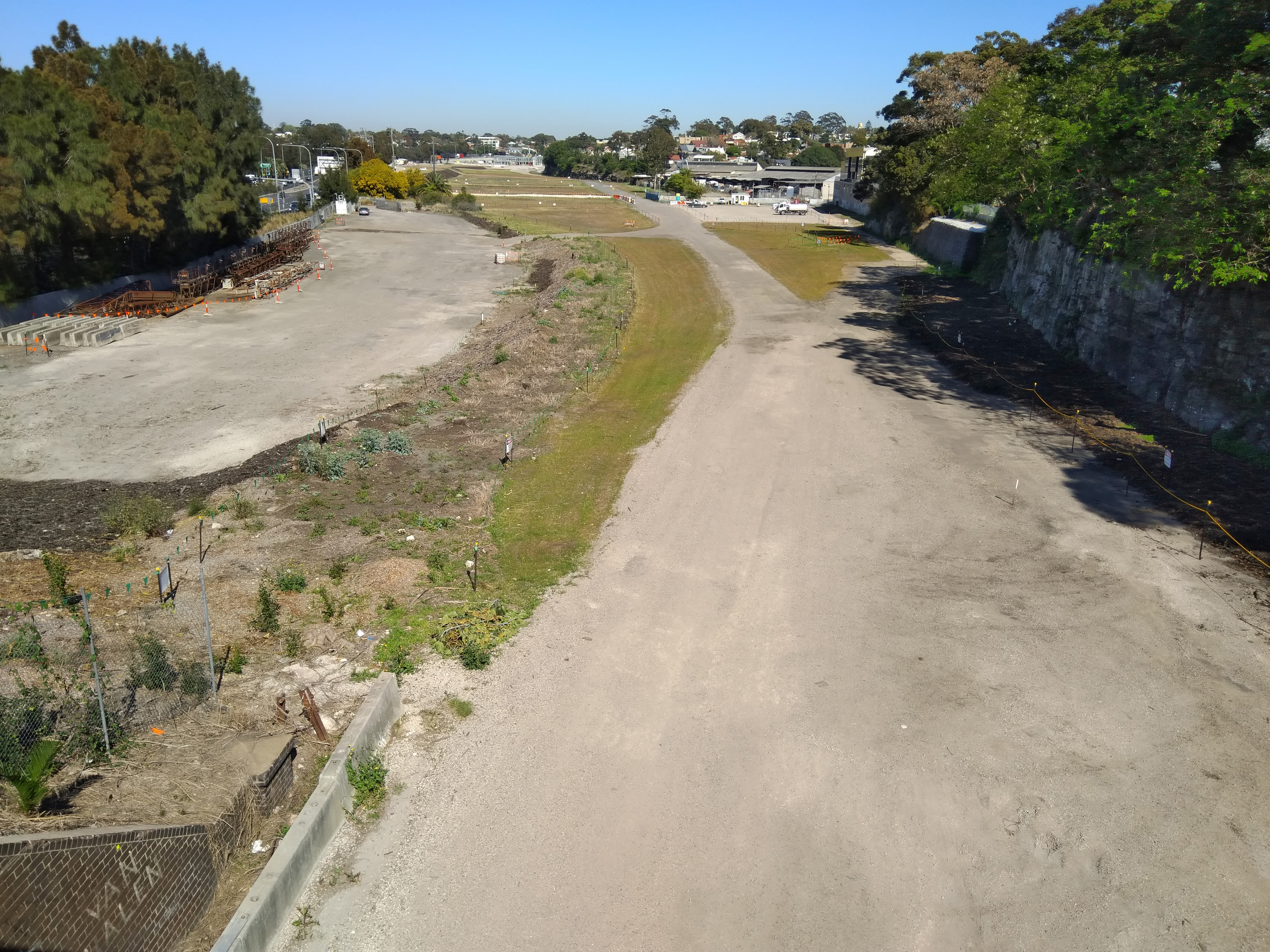
Rozelle Yard in 2018, after disused infrastructure was cleared for redevelopment

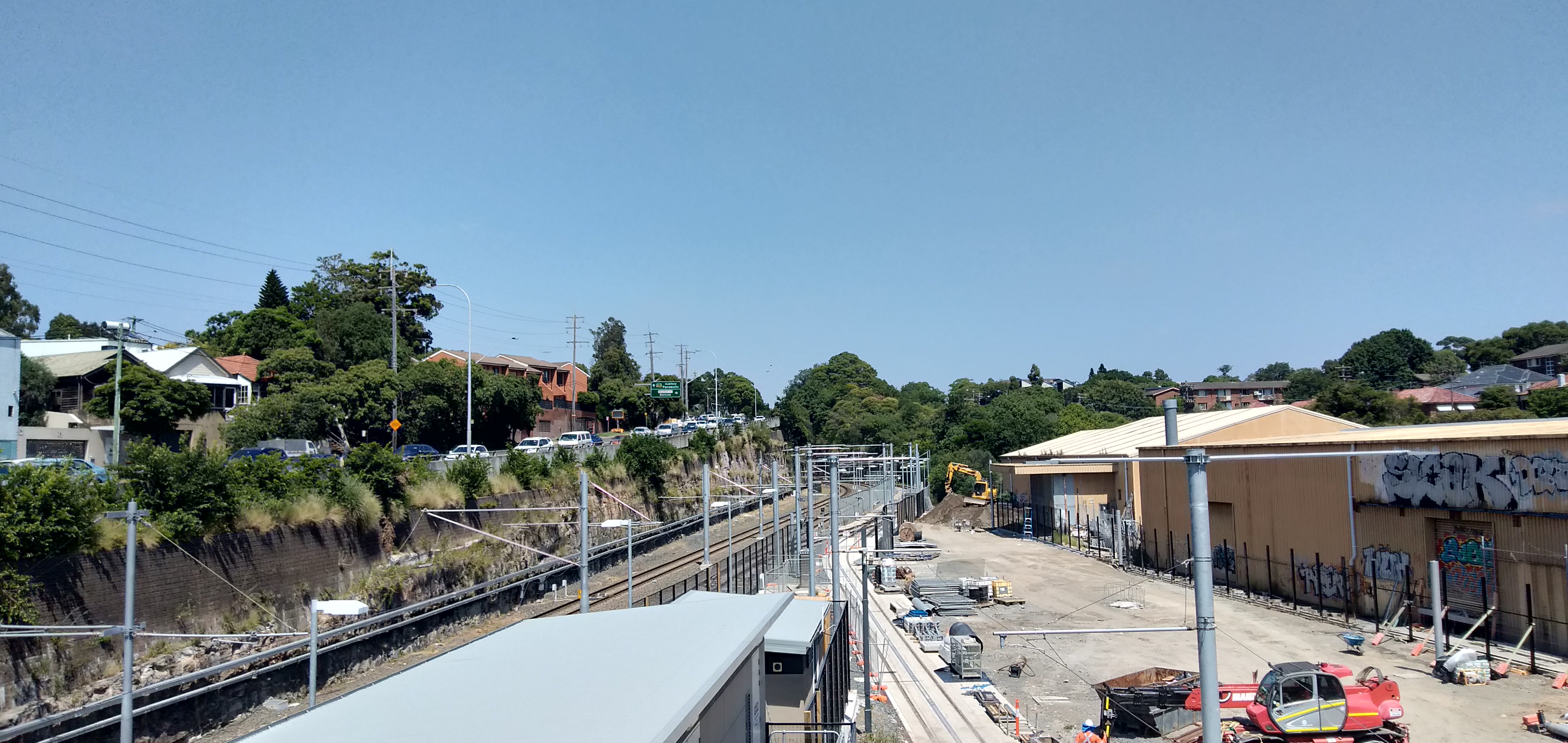
Looking west from Catherine Street in 2019. A junction connects the line to the new depot

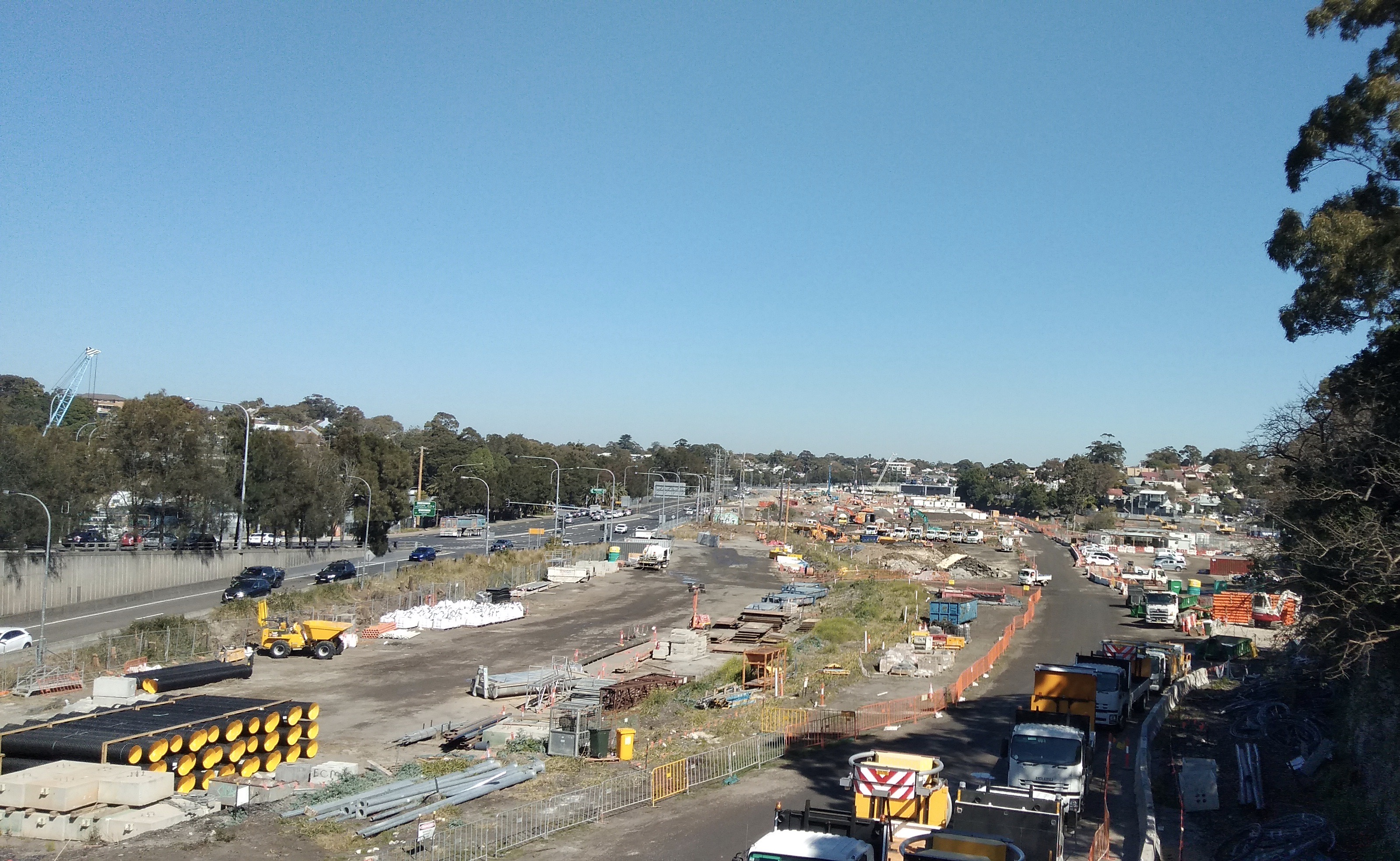
Site of the yard in 2019 as construction was ongoing
