= Department of Planning and Environment =

Former Department of the New South Wales Government

New South Wales Department of Planning and Environment
Department overview
- Formed: 1 July 2019 (as Department of Planning, Industry and Environment)
- Preceding agencies: Department of Planning and Environment (2014–2019); Department of Industry (2015–2019); Office of Environment and Heritage (2011–2019)
- Dissolved: 1 January 2024
- Superseding agencies: Department of Planning, Housing and Infrastructure; Department of Climate Change, Energy, the Environment and Water
- Type: Department
- Jurisdiction: New South Wales
- Headquarters: 12 Darcy Street, Parramatta
- Employees: 636 (2018)
- Annual budget: A$2.6 billion (2018)
- Ministers responsible: The Hon. Penny Sharpe MLC, Minister for the Environment; Minister for Climate Change; Minister for Energy; Minister for Heritage; The Hon. Rose Jackson MLC, Minister for Water; The Hon. Ron Hoenig MP, Minister for Local Government
- Department executive: Kiersten Fishburn, Secretary
- Child Department: Environment Protection Authority
- Website: www.dpie.nsw.gov.au

The New South Wales Department of Planning and Environment (DPE) was a department of the New South Wales Government, responsible for effective and sustainable planning to support the growth in the state of New South Wales, Australia. It made plans based on evidence for the state's cities and regions, working with the community, business and local government to create places for people in NSW to live, work and spend their leisure time, while ensuring good access to transport and other services like shops and restaurants. The department was also responsible for the evidence-based assessment of state significant development applications.

The department was renamed from the Department of Planning, Industry and Environment (DPIE) on 21 December 2021. The DPIE was formed on 1 July 2019 following the 2019 state election and replaced an earlier Department of Planning and Environment and Department of Industry. The department was also responsible for the development of industry until these functions were transferred to the new Department of Regional NSW in April 2020.

== History ==
Logo used when the department was named Department of Planning, Industry & Environment

=== Previous departments ===
The main planning department/authority in New South Wales had various names throughout its history. Starting with the State Planning Authority, which replaced the Cumberland County Council and the Northumberland County Council in December 1963, previous planning departments were:

- State Planning Authority (1963–1974)
- New South Wales Planning and Environment Commission (1974–1980)
- Department of Environment and Planning (1980–1988)
- Department of Planning (1988–1995)
- Department of Urban Affairs and Planning (1995–2001)
- Department of Planning (2001 – April 2003)
- Department of Urban and Transport Planning (April – July 2003)
- Department of Infrastructure, Planning and Natural Resources (July 2003 – 2005)
- Department of Planning (2005–2011)
- Department of Planning and Infrastructure (2011–2014)
- Department of Planning and Environment (2014–2019)

The planning department adopted the "Department of Planning and Environment" name in April 2014 after Mike Baird became Premier of New South Wales. In 2015–16 the department approved major projects worth A$20 billion.

Between 2014 and 2019, the Office of Environment and Heritage (OEH) also existed within the Department of Planning and Environment. Previous environment authority/office/departments in New South Wales were:

- Environment Protection Authority (1992–2003)
- Department of Environment and Conservation (2003–2007)
- Department of Environment and Climate Change (2007–2009)
- Department of Environment, Climate Change and Water (2009–2011)
- Office of Environment and Heritage (OEH) (2011–2019)
  - under the Department of Premier and Cabinet (2011–2014)
  - under the Department of Planning and Environment (2014–2019)

=== Formation ===
The establishment of a new planning department was announced in April 2019 following the 2019 state election. The new department would be formed from the merger of the Department of Planning and Environment and Department of Industry, the latter formed in July 2015. The new department was originally planned to be named the Department of Planning and Industry. The Office of Local Government and the Office of Environment and Heritage (OEH) would also be abolished and merged into the new department. The heritage functions of the OEH were an exception and would be assumed by the Heritage Branch within Department of Premier and Cabinet, later known as Heritage NSW. The abolition of the OEH and the lack of the word "Environment" in the name of the new department generated criticism from OEH staff, environmental groups and the opposition. In May 2019, the "Environment" word was added to the proposed name.

All proposed changes took effect on 1 July 2019 and the new department was established. The new department was initially spread across a number of sites, mostly in the Sydney CBD. In January and February 2020, the department relocated and consolidated most of its staff in a newly built tower at 4 Parramatta Square. Shortly after moving into the building, the department was criticised by unions and some staff for spending $1,246,000 fitting out its new offices with indoor plants. The expenditure was not supported by the planning minister, Rob Stokes.

In April 2020, the Regions, Industry, Agriculture and Resources division of DPIE was spun out as the Department of Regional NSW, a separate government department. On 21 December 2021, the reduced DPIE was renamed back the Department of Planning and Environment.

Heritage NSW was transferred back from the Department of Premier and Cabinet to the Department of Planning and Environment on 1 April 2022.

Legislation to create the Greater Sydney Parklands Trust passed on 29 March 2022, which would comprise Centennial Parklands (including Moore Park and Queens Park), Western Sydney Parklands, Parramatta Park, Callan Park and Fernhill Estate and their individual park trusts. The trust, along with the Luna Park Reserve Trust, Place Management NSW and the Royal Botanic Gardens and Domain Trust, were transferred from DoPE to Transport for NSW on 1 April 2022.

=== Dissolution ===
Following a media release on 18 August 2023, it was announced that, as of 1 January 2024, the department would be split into two new entities: the Department of Climate Change, Energy, the Environment and Water, and the Department of Planning, Housing and Infrastructure. The former would also be joined by the Office of Energy and Climate Change, which was until then a part of the New South Wales Treasury.

== Structure ==
Until its dissolution in 2024, the department was the lead agency in the Planning and Environment cluster, led by Secretary, at the time, Kiersten Fishburn since October 2021.

Between June 2021 and December 2021, the department was made up of six core delivery groups:

- Water (including Hunter Water, Sydney Water and WaterNSW)
- Housing & Property
- Environment, Energy & Science (which replaced the Office of Environment & Heritage)
- Planning & Assessment
- Place, Design & Urban Spaces
- Planning Delivery Unit & Local Government

There was also previously another core delivery group, Regions, Industry, Agriculture & Resources until it was transferred to the new Department of Regional NSW in April 2020.

=== Ministers ===
The department was responsible to the cluster's three portfolio ministers: at the time of its dissolution, the Minister for the Environment, Minister for Climate Change, Minister for Energy, and Minister for Heritage, the Hon. Penny Sharpe MLC; the Minister for Water, the Hon. Rose Jackson MLC; the Minister for Local Government, the Hon. Ron Hoenig MP. All ministers were ultimately responsible to the Parliament of New South Wales.

The department administered the Environmental Planning and Assessment Act 1979 and the Biodiversity Conservation Act 2016.

=== Agencies ===
The following agencies are included in the Planning and Environment cluster, administered by the Department:

- Aboriginal Housing Office
- Cemeteries & Crematoria NSW
- Crown Lands
- Energy NSW
- Environment, Energy and Science
- Environment Protection Authority
- Environmental Trust
- Government Architect NSW
- Great Public Spaces
- Green and Resilient Places
- Land & Housing Corporation
- National Parks & Wildlife Service
- Natural Resources Access Regulator
- Office of Local Government
- Planning
- Planning Portal
- Property and Development NSW
- Snowy Advisory Committee
- Sydney Olympic Park Authority
- The Rocks
- Valuer General
- Water Infrastructure

=== Priorities ===
The previous Department of Planning and Environment's corporate plan was outlined in Planning for Growing NSW: 2015–2017 that aimed to plan for growth by inspiring strong communities and by protecting the environment. In keeping with this, the department's priorities were:

- Enabling the creation of strong, vibrant communities
- Make the planning system simpler, cheaper and faster
- Supporting affordable and appropriately-serviced housing and employment land
- Assessing major projects and infrastructure in a timely and efficient way, while ensuring appropriate planning outcomes

== See also ==
- List of New South Wales government agencies
- Urban planning in Australia
- Department of Industry (New South Wales)
- Department of Regional NSW
