= NSW National Parks and Wildlife Service =

Government agency of New South Wales

National Parks and Wildlife Service

Agency overview
- Formed: 1967; 59 years ago
- Jurisdiction: New South Wales
- Headquarters: 12 Darcy Street, Parramatta Square, Sydney NSW, Australia
- Minister responsible: The Hon Penny Sharpe, MLC, Minister for the Environment
- Agency executive: Anthony Lean, Secretary, Department of Climate Change, Energy, the Environment and Water (NSW)
- Parent department: NSW Department of Climate Change, Energy, the Environment and Water
- Website: www.nationalparks.nsw.gov.au

The National Parks and Wildlife Service (NPWS) is a directorate of the New South Wales Department of Climate Change, Energy, the Environment and Water that is responsible for managing more than 890 national parks and reserves, covering over 7.5 million hectares of land across the state of New South Wales, Australia. Despite its name, the NPWS is a state organisation, similar to other national park and wildlife agencies around Australia. However, the state and territory governments will often cooperate in areas of shared interest and concern.

== History ==
The NPWS was established in 1967 when the Fauna Protection Panel and the Parks and Reserves Branch of the NSW Lands Department were amalgamated under Lands Minister Tom Lewis AO. Lewis also established a charity, the National Parks Foundation, to assist the NPWS in raising funds for conservation. The first Co-ordinator General of the NPWS was Sam P. Weems, a former superintendent in the US National Park Service. Seven years after the founding of the NPWS, various state laws regulating flora and fauna were consolidated together into the National Parks and Wildlife Act 1974, which remains the enabling legislation for the NPWS to this day. Training of NPWS staff and rangers was conducted at an academy training facility located within the Royal National Park area.

From its establishment in 1967 until 2003 the NPWS was a discrete agency of the NSW Government. Since that time it has been a directorate of various broader state government departments. In September 2003 it joined with the Environment Protection Authority, Resource New South Wales, and the Royal Botanic Gardens and Domain Trust to form the Department of Environment and Conservation. This department, by then renamed as the Department of Environment, Climate Change and Water, was abolished in 2011, and the NPWS was transferred to the Office of Environment & Heritage under the Department of Premier and Cabinet. In 2014 the Office of Environment & Heritage was transferred to the Department of Planning and Environment before also being abolished in 2019. Today, the NPWS continues to be a part of the Department of Planning and Environment cluster, within the Environment and Heritage Group.

== Scope of activities ==
Nearly 900 protected areas of a variety of types have been declared in New South Wales under the National Parks and Wildlife Act 1974, most of which the NPWS has the responsibility to manage. Covering over 70,000 square kilometres (7,000,000 ha), these range from national parks where the NPWS is tasked with conserving biodiversity and protecting ecological integrity to other less restrictive categories of parks and reserves where more intensive human activity must be balanced against maintaining natural and cultural values. This is controlled through the preparation of plans of management which determine how the NPWS manages conservation, hazard protection, research, education, and sustainable visitation activities in its parks and reserves. The NPWS also administers fire management strategies for the land it manages in order to limit risks from bushfires, such as by conducting hazard reduction burns in collaboration with other state agencies such as the New South Wales Rural Fire Service.

== Organisational structure ==
The NPWS is divided into four branches: Business Delivery, Park Operations (Coastal), Park Operations (Inland), and Conservation and Aboriginal Partnerships. It is led by a Deputy Secretary, who reports to the Coordinator-General of the Environment and Heritage Group, who reports to the Secretary of the Department of Planning and Environment, who in turn reports to the Minister for the Environment, the minister responsible for the NPWS.

== Gallery ==
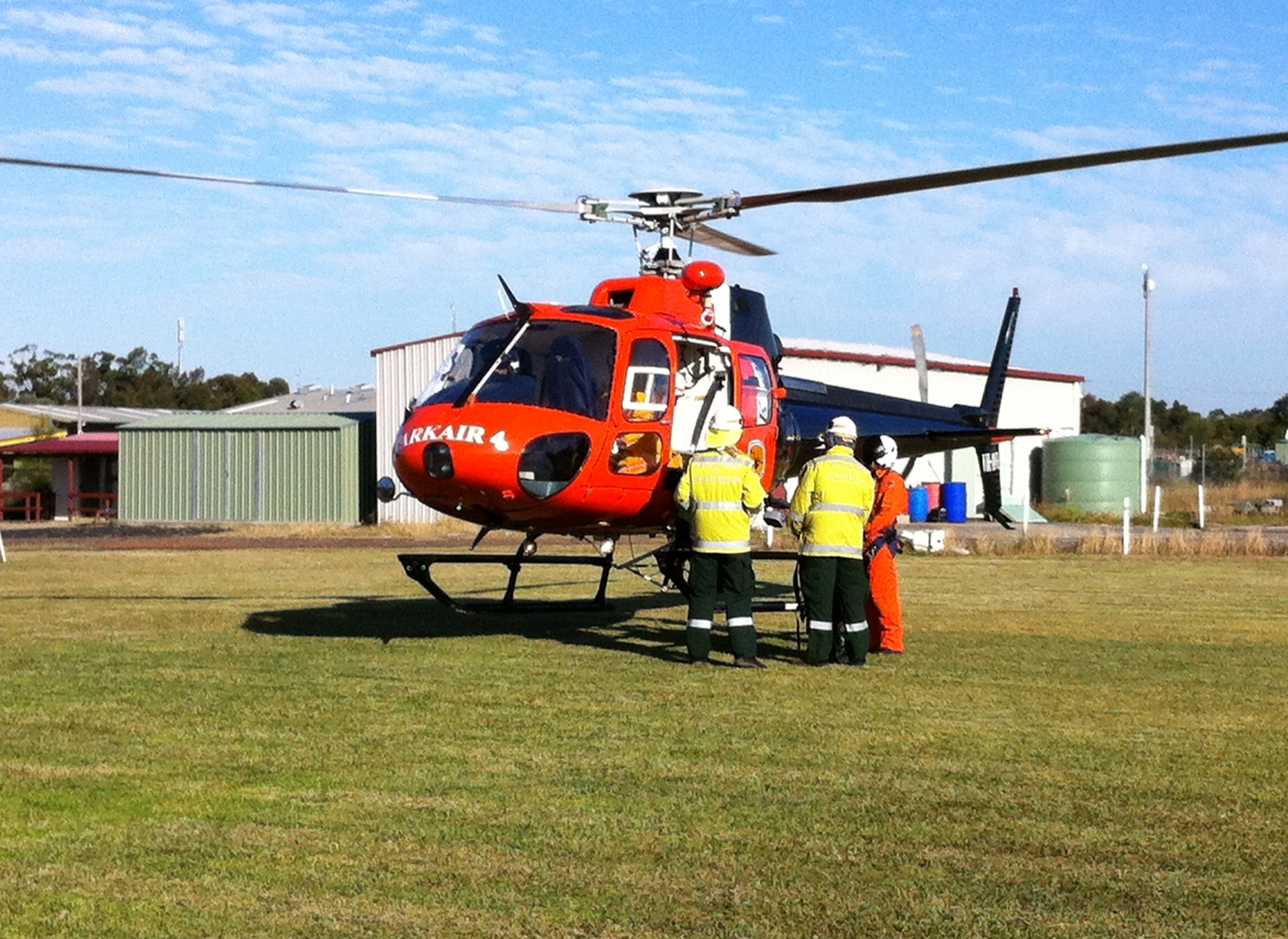
Park Air (1, 2, 3, 4, 5)

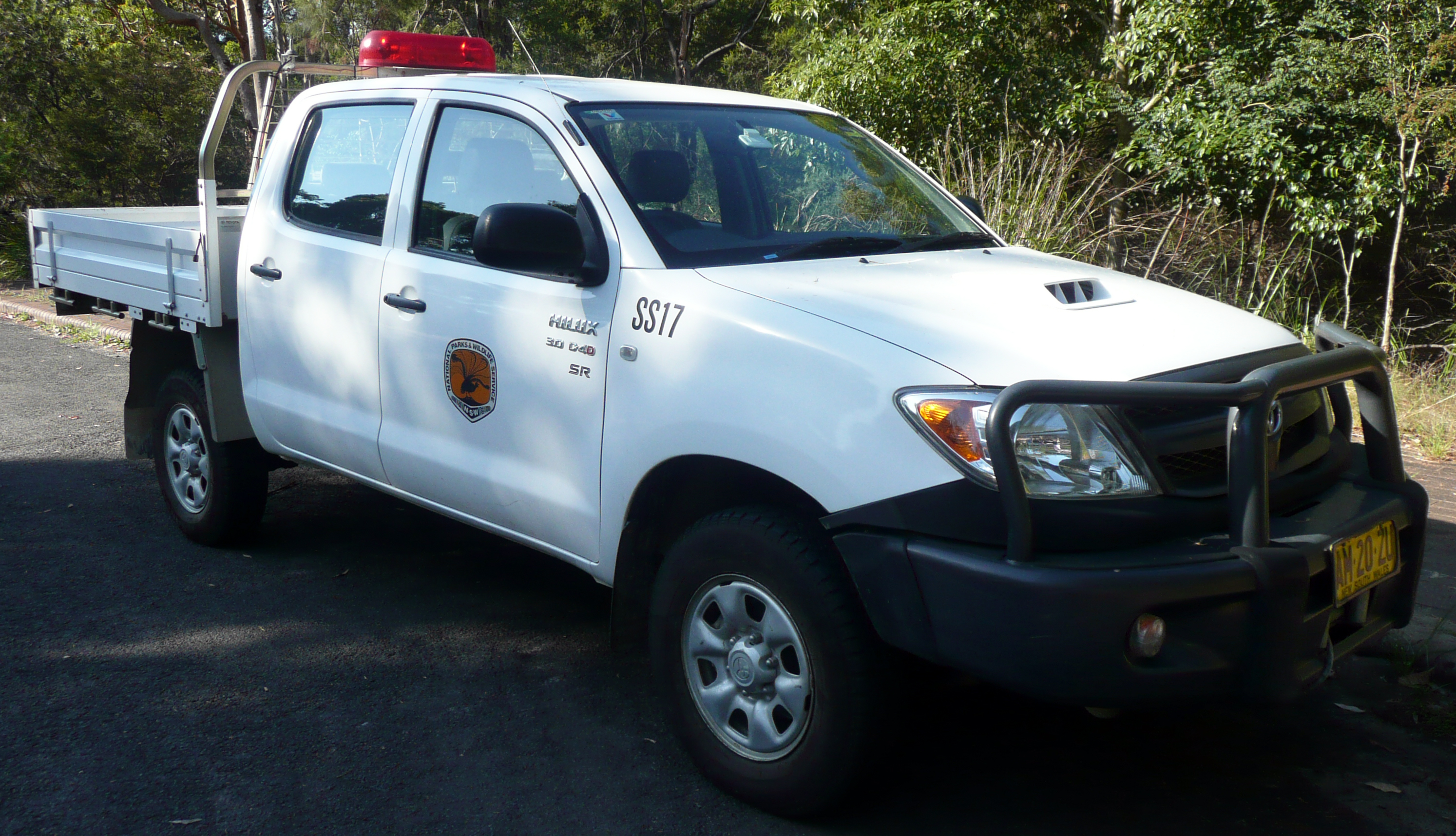
Ranger and Field Officer Work Ute

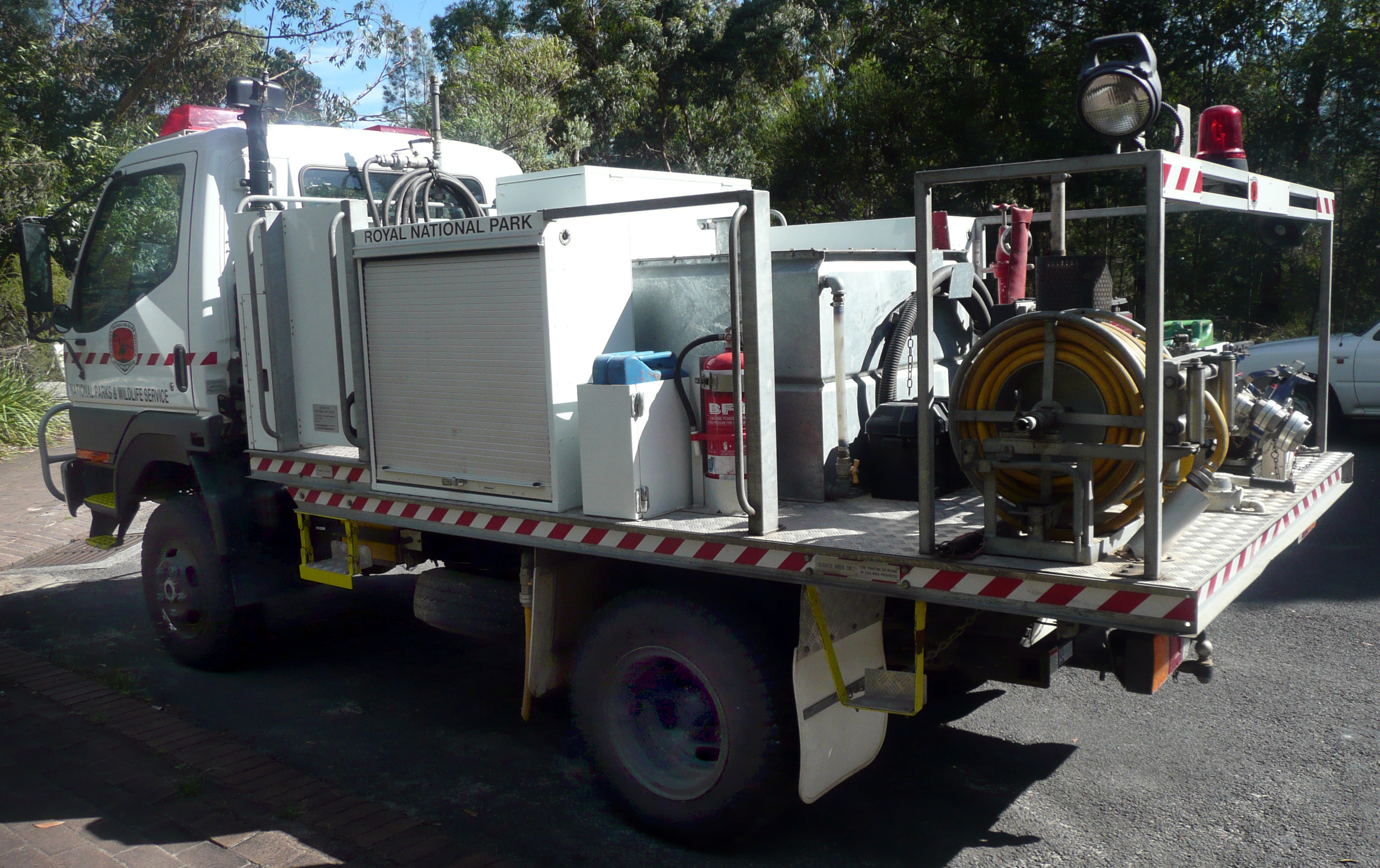
Fire vehicle (Cat 7)

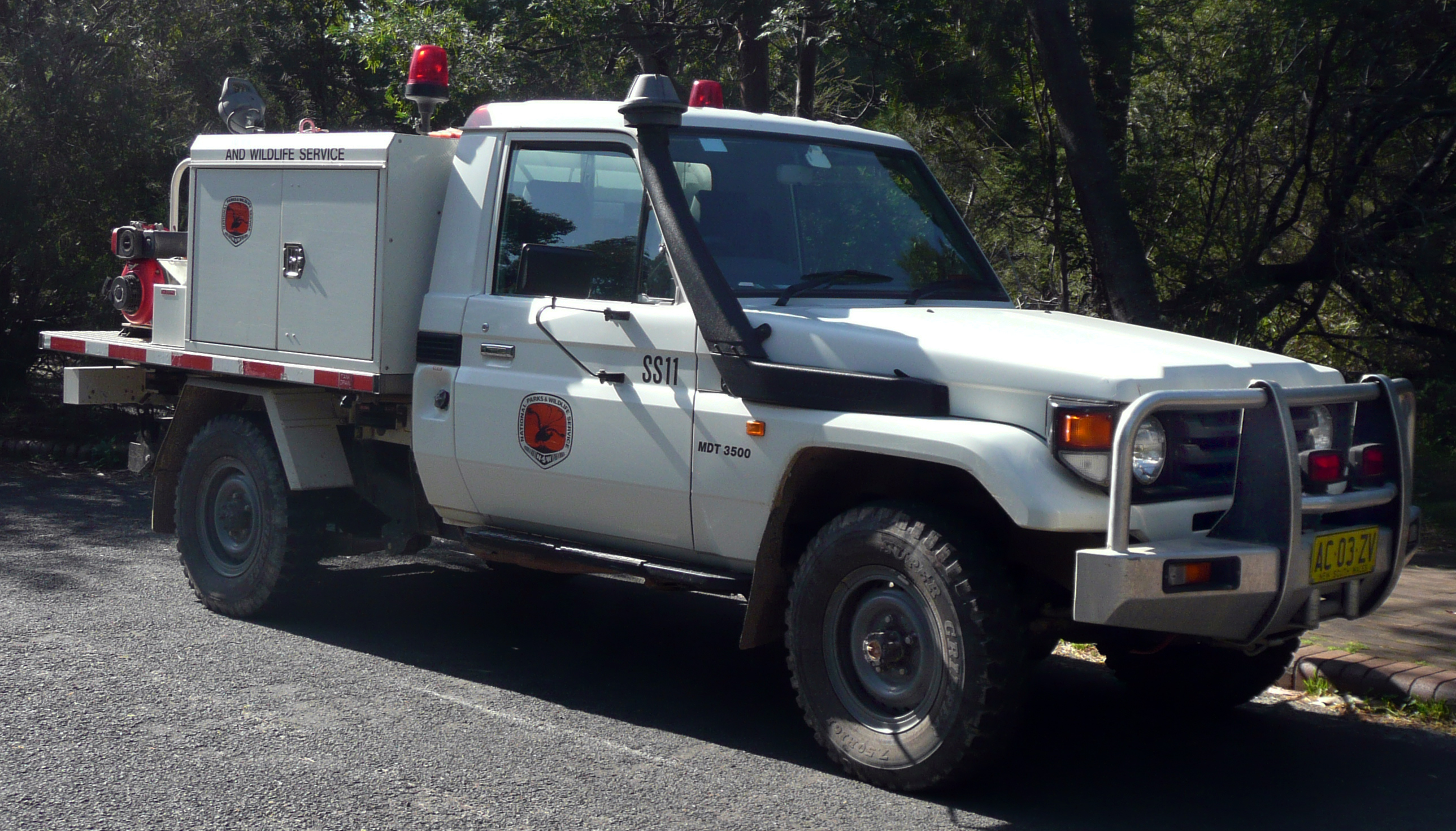
Fire vehicle (Cat 9)

== See also ==
- Protected areas of New South Wales
- National Parks and Wildlife Act 1974
- Parks Victoria
- Queensland Parks and Wildlife Service
- Tasmania Parks and Wildlife Service
- National Parks and Wildlife Service South Australia
- Department of Biodiversity, Conservation and Attractions
- Parks and Wildlife Commission of the Northern Territory
