= Department of Planning, Housing and Infrastructure =

Department of the New South Wales Government

Department overview
- Formed: 1 January 2024
- Preceding Department: Department of Planning and Environment (2019–2024)
- Type: Department
- Jurisdiction: New South Wales
- Headquarters: 12 Darcy Street, Parramatta
- Ministers responsible: The Hon. Paul Scully MP, Minister for Planning and Public Spaces; The Hon. Rose Jackson MLC, Minister for Housing; The Hon. Ron Hoenig MP, Minister for Local Government; The Hon. Steve Kamper MP, Minister for Lands and Property; The Hon. Prue Car MP, Minister for Western Sydney
- Department executive: Kiersten Fishburn, Secretary
- Child agencies: Office of Local Government; Property and Development NSW; Western Parkland City Authority
- Website: www.nsw.gov.au/departments-and-agencies/department-of-planning-housing-and-infrastructure

The New South Wales Department of Planning, Housing and Infrastructure (DPHI) is a department of the New South Wales Government, responsible for effective and sustainable planning to support the growth in the state of New South Wales, Australia. It makes plans based on evidence for the state's cities and regions, working with the community, business and local government to create places for people in NSW to live, work and spend their leisure time, while ensuring good access to transport and other services like shops and restaurants. The department was also responsible for the evidence-based assessment of state significant development applications.

== History ==
=== Formation ===
Following a media release on 18 August 2023, it was announced that, as of 1 January 2024, the department would be split into two new entities: the Department of Climate Change, Energy, the Environment and Water, and the Department of Planning, Housing and Infrastructure. The former would also be joined by the Office of Energy and Climate Change, which was until then a part of the New South Wales Treasury.

=== Agencies ===
The following agencies are included in the Planning, Housing and Infrastructure cluster, administered by the Department:

- Botanic Gardens of Sydney
  - Royal Botanic Garden, Sydney
  - Australian Botanic Garden Mount Annan
  - Blue Mountains Botanic Garden, Mount Tomah
  - The Domain Sydney
  - Australian Institute of Botanical Science
- Cemeteries & Crematoria NSW
- Crown Lands
- Greater Sydney Parklands
  - Callan Park
  - Centennial Parklands
  - Fernhill Estate
  - Parramatta Park
  - Western Sydney Parklands
- Hunter and Central Coast Development Corporation
- NSW Independent Planning Commission
- Office of Local Government
- Planning
- Property and Development NSW
- Sydney Olympic Park Authority
- Valuer General
- Bradfield Development Authority (Note: Western Parkland City Authority until 30 June 2024)

== See also ==
- List of New South Wales government agencies
- Urban planning in Australia
- Department of Industry (New South Wales)
- Department of Regional NSW
