= DECC =

DECC may refer to:

- Department of Energy and Climate Change, United Kingdom
- Department of Environment, Climate Change and Water (New South Wales), formerly Department of Environment and Climate Change
- Duluth Entertainment Convention Center
