= 2024 Parramatta City Council election =

- 14 September 2024

All 15 seats on Parramatta City Council 8 seats needed for a majority
- Registered: 145,578
- Turnout: 84.3%

	First party	Second party	Third party
Leader	N/A	N/A	Kellie Darley
Party	Liberal	Labor	Champions
Leader's seat	N/A	N/A	Dundas
Last election	Did not contest	7 seats	Did not exist
Seats before	1	5	1
Seats won	6	6	2
Seat change	▲5 (Note: Compared with Independent Liberals in 2021.)	▲1	▲1
Primary vote	41,777	36,344	11,045
Percentage	35.7%	31.1%	12.1%
Swing	▲30.0	▼10.4	▲7.2
	Fourth party	Fifth party	Sixth party
	OLC		LWI
Leader	Michelle Garrard	N/A	Charles Chen
Party	OLC	Greens	Lorraine Wearne
Leader's seat	Dundas (lost seat)	N/A	Epping (won seat)
Last election	4 seats	1 seat	1 seat
Seats before	3	1	1
Seats won	0	1	1
Seat change	▼3	Steady	Steady
Primary vote	11,902	7,499	3,772
Percentage	10.2%	6.4%	3.2%
Swing	▼10.2	▼3.7	▼5.3
- Results by ward

An election for the City of Parramatta council was held on 14 September 2024 to elect 15 councillors. The election was held as part of the statewide local government elections in New South Wales.

The Liberal Party and the Labor Party won six seats each. The gains for the Liberals largely came at the expense of Our Local Community, which lost all four seats it had won in 2021.

== Background ==
At the 2017 election, the Liberal Party won six seats and 36.5% of the council-wide vote. In 2021, the party chose not to endorse any candidates in Parramatta, with only one Independent Liberal candidate – Georgina Valjak – elected across the entire council.

In 2023, Dundas Ward councillor Kellie Darley formed the "Community Champions" party.

Labor councillor Donna Davis was elected to the New South Wales Legislative Assembly as the member for Parramatta at the 2023 state election. She resigned as a councillor for Epping Ward in January 2024.

On 14 June 2024, Our Local Community's Dan Siviero resigned as a councillor for Rosehill Ward. In August 2024, Rosehill Ward councillor Paul Noack lost Labor preselection and resigned from the party.

== Electoral system ==
Like in all other New South Wales local government areas (LGAs), Parramatta City Council elections use optional preferential voting. Under this system, voters are only required to vote for one candidate or group, although they can choose to preference other candidates.

All elections for councillor positions are elected using proportional representation. Parramatta has an Australian Senate-style ballot paper with above-the-line and below-the-line voting. The council is divided into five wards, each electing three councillors.

The election was conducted by the New South Wales Electoral Commission (NSWEC).

== Retiring councillors ==
=== Labor ===
- Pierre Esber (Dundas) – announced retirement on 17 June 2024
- Ange Humphries (North Rocks)

=== Lorraine Wearne Independents ===
- Lorraine Wearne (Epping) – announced retirement on 13 August 2024

== Candidates ==
Greens councillor Phil Bradley contested the election in the second position on the party's Parramatta Ward ticket, saying he did not intend to be re-elected.

=== Dundas ===
Labor (Group A)	Our Local Community (Group B)	Liberal (Group C)	Community Champions (Group D)
1. Anthony Ellard; 2. Sam Daher; 3. Siok Eng Chen	1. Michelle Garrard; 2. Wayne Butcher; 3. Kevin Wu	1. Tanya Raffoul; 2. William Olive; 3. Brian Park	1. Kellie Darley; 2. Liz Wheeler; 3. Tania Suapopo

=== Epping ===
Liberal (Group A)	Greens (Group B)	Labor (Group C)	Community Champions (Group D)	Lorraine Wearne Inds (Group E)
1. Sreeni Pillamarri; 2. Taj Mawass; 3. Violet Jima	1. Sophie Edington; 2. Astrid O'Neill; 3. Adam Braun	1. Cameron Maclean; 2. Roushan Mahmud; 3. John Hendry	1. Natalie Ng; 2. Penelope Perry; 3. Korinda Turnbull	1. Charles Chen; 2. Matthew King; 3. Min Chen

=== North Rocks ===
Labor (Group A)	Liberal (Group B)	Our Local Community (Group C)	Community Champions (Group D)
1. Hayley French; 2. Heba Kassoua; 3. Nick Nikolaidis	1. Georgina Valjak; 2. Manning Jeffrey; 3. Ian Gilbertson	1. Donna Wang; 2. Robyn Walkom; 3. Otto Metzger	1. Justin Mulder; 2. Florencia Milinkovic; 3. Stephanie Keane

=== Parramatta ===
Our Local Community (Group A)	Greens (Group B)	Libertarian (Group C)	Labor (Group D)	Liberal (Group E)
1. Henry Green; 2. Alan Sexton; 3. Jason Garrard	1. Judy Greenwood; 2. Phil Bradley; 3. Stewart Jackson	1. Charles Rios; 2. Anthony Rebase; 3. Janette Juarez	1. Sameer Pandey; 2. Prabir Maitra; 3. Nazira Sowaid	1. Martin Zaiter; 2. Simon Chhoeu; 3. Peter Romanos

=== Rosehill ===
Labor (Group A)	Community Champions (Group B)	Liberal (Group C)	Libertarian (Group D)
1. Patricia Prociv; 2. Michael Ng; 3. Mithun Chakraborty	1. Jayne Christian; 2. Margie Lim; 3. Karlene Hindmarsh	1. Steven Issa; 2. Vijay Sharma; 3. Nayden Tarabay	1. Mark Antony Guest; 2. Xu Li; 3. Elsa Rios
Paul Noack Inds (Group E)	Our Local Community (Group F)	Ungrouped	
1. Paul Noack; 2. Heba Aly; 3. Jaspreet Singh	1. Lee Malkoun; 2. Dan Siviero; 3. Kelly Xiao	Harry Giann (Ind)	

=== Withdrawn candidates ===
Party	Candidate	Ward	Details
Labor	Ange Humphries	North Rocks	Initially announced plan to recontest but withdrew for unknown reasons.
Lorraine Wearne Inds	Lorraine Wearne	Epping	Initially announced plan to recontest but withdrew citing health reasons.

== Results ==
=== Ward results ===
2024 Parramatta City Council election: Ward results
Party	Votes	%	Swing	Seats	Change
Liberal	41,777	35.7	+30.0	6	▲5
Labor	36,344	31.1	−10.4	6	▼1
Community Champions	12,735	10.9	−6.7	1	Steady
Our Local Community	11,902	10.2	−9.2	0	▼4
Greens	7,499	6.4	−3.7	1	Steady
Lorraine Wearne Independents	3,772	3.2	−5.3	1	Steady
Paul Noack Independents	1,471	1.3	+1.3	0	Steady
Libertarian	1,355	1.2	−0.8	0	Steady
Independents	27	0.0		0	Steady
Formal votes	116,882	95.3			
Informal votes	5,809	4.7			
Total	122,691	100.0		15	
Registered voters / turnout	145,578	84.3			

=== Dundas ===
2024 Parramatta City Council election: Dundas Ward
Party	Candidate	Votes	%	±%
Liberal	1. Tanya Raffoul (elected 1); 2. William Olive; 3. Brian Park	7,678	33.6	
Labor	1. Anthony Ellard (elected 2); 2. Sam Daher; 3. Siok Eng Chen	6,442	28.2	−9.3
Community Champions	1. Kellie Darley (elected 3); 2. Liz Wheeler; 3. Tania Suapopo	5,049	22.1	+1.1
Our Local Community	1. Michelle Garrard; 2. Wayne Butcher; 3. Kevin Wu	3,665	16.1	−9.6
Total formal votes		22,834	94.5	+0.2
Informal votes		1,337	5.5	−0.2
Turnout		24,171	83.5	−0.1

=== Epping ===
2024 Parramatta City Council election: Epping Ward
Party	Candidate	Votes	%	±%
Liberal	1. Sreeni Pillamarri (elected 1); 2. Taj Mawass; 3. Violet Jima	8,107	33.5	
Labor	1. Cameron Maclean (elected 2); 2. Roushan Mahmud; 3. Josh Hendry	6,412	26.5	−25.3
Lorraine Wearne Independents	1. Charles Chen (elected 3); 2. Matthew King; 3. Min Chen	3,772	15.6	−24.6
Greens	1. Sophie Edington; 2. Astrid O'Neill; 3. Adam Braun	3,396	14.0	
Community Champions	1. Natalie Ng; 2. Penelope Perry; 3. Korinda Turnbull	2,494	10.3	
Total formal votes		24,181	96.0	+0.5
Informal votes		1,020	4.0	−0.5
Turnout		25,201	88.2	+0.7

=== North Rocks ===
2024 Parramatta City Council election: North Rocks Ward
Party	Candidate	Votes	%	±%
Liberal	1. Georgina Valjak (elected 1); 2. Manning Jeffrey (elected 3); 3. Ian Gilbertson	11,518	45.9	+17.9
Labor	1. Hayley French (elected 2); 2. Heba Kassoua; 3. Nick Nikolaidis	6,779	27.0	−6.5
Our Local Community	1. Donna Wang; 2. Robyn Walkom; 3. Otto Metzger	3,587	14.3	−10.2
Community Champions	1. Justin Mulder; 2. Florencia Milinkovic; 3. Stephanie Keane	3,232	12.9	
Total formal votes		25,116	96.0	0.0
Informal votes		1,057	4.0	0.0
Turnout		26,173	87.6	+0.1

=== Parramatta ===
2024 Parramatta City Council election: Parramatta Ward
Party	Candidate	Votes	%	±%
Labor	1. Sameer Pandey (elected 1); 2. Prabir Maitra; 3. Nazira Sowaid	7,594	33.9	−7.3
Liberal	1. Martin Zaiter (elected 2); 2. Simon Chhoeu; 3. Peter Romanos	7,163	32.0	
Greens	1. Judy Greenwood (elected 3); 2. Phil Bradley; 3. Stewart Jackson	4,103	18.3	−1.8
Our Local Community	1. Henry Green; 2. Alan Sexton; 3. Jason Garrard	2,709	12.1	−16.0
Libertarian	1. Charles Rios; 2. Anthony Rebase; 3. Janette Juarez	826	3.7	−6.9
Total formal votes		22,395	95.0	+0.3
Informal votes		1,176	5.0	−0.3
Turnout		23,571	82.7	+1.7

=== Rosehill ===
2024 Parramatta City Council election: Rosehill Ward
Party	Candidate	Votes	%	±%
Labor	1. Patricia Prociv (elected 1); 2. Michael Ng (elected 3); 3. Mithun Chakraborty	9,117	40.8	−2.4
Liberal	1. Steven Issa (elected 2); 2. Vijay Sharma; 3. Nayden Tarabay	7,311	32.7	
Community Champions	1. Jayne Christian; 2. Margie Lim; 3. Karlene Hindmarsh	1,960	8.8	
Our Local Community	1. Lee Malkoun; 2. Dan Siviero; 3. Kelly Xiao	1,941	8.7	−11.6
Paul Noack Independents	1. Paul Noack; 2. Heba Aly; 3. Jaspreet Singh	1,471	6.6	
Libertarian	1. Mark Antony Guest; 2. Xu Li; 3. Elsa Rios	529	2.4	
Independent	Harry Giann	27	0.1	
Total formal votes		22,356	94.8	−0.8
Informal votes		1,219	5.2	+0.8
Turnout		23,575	82.7	+1.7
