= Environmental Trust (New South Wales) =

The Environmental Trust is an independent statutory body in the Australian state of New South Wales (NSW) whose main activity is as a funding body for projects that aim to improve the environment of the state.

== History ==
The Trust was established by the Environmental Trust Act 1998 with the objects:

- Promoting restoration and rehabilitation projects in the public and private sectors which will, or are likely to, reduce pollution, the waste-stream or environmental degradation;
- Promoting research into environmental problems in both the public and private sectors;
- Promoting environmental education projects in the public and private sectors, and public awareness of environmental issues; and
- Funding the acquisition of land for the national parks estate.

The Trust is administered by the Office of Environment & Heritage, within the Department of Premier and Cabinet.

The funds in the Trust are also used for the purposes of the Forestry Restructuring and Nature Conservation Act 1995, which has been amended several times and is currently funding Riverina area expenditure up to a maximum of $45,813,000 until 30 June 2015.

The trust consists of the following five members:

1. the Minister for the Environment, who is the Chairperson
2. the Secretary of the New South Wales Treasury
3. Director-General of Department of Premier and Cabinet (delegated to the Chief Executive of the Office of Environment & Heritage)
4. one person appointed by the Minister from a panel of three persons nominated by the Nature Conservation Council
5. one person appointed by the Minister from a panel of three persons nominated by the Local Government and Shires Associations
