= Contemporary Australian environmental incidents =

The following is a maintained list of contemporary Australian environmental and cultural incidents that have resulted in destroyed, degraded or damaged notable cultural or environmental items.

The intention of this list is to create a hospitable environment for the contribution and creation of a detailed lineage of intentional and unintentional anthropogenic activities or actors that continue to contribute to the ongoing degradation of Australian and First Nations cultural heritage and environmental sites.

The term incidents refers to any significant human activity, accidental or not, that contributes or creates the conditions in which environmental and cultural heritage is degraded. Conditions of degradation can be determined if the item or event, without human interaction would have sustained itself markedly better.

Entries considered suitable for this article

- The incident itself has an anthropogenic underlying cause or interaction
- The entry does not already have enough notability to warrant its own article, such as the Juukan Gorge disaster.

Fish kills also occurred in late 2022 and early 2023.

== Conventional ecosystems ==
=== Murray Darling fish kills (2018 and January 2019) ===
Location	40 kilometer stretch of the Darling River, both downstream and within Menindee Lakes
Site Description	Menindee Lake The Menindee lakes are 7 adjacent lake systems connected to the lower darling river through a series of weirs, channels and levees. The lower darling constitutes all of the Darling river regulated by releases from the Menindee Lakes scheme, thus the Menindee Lakes system is located at the end of the Darling River. Over 30 species of water birds use the lakes for habitat, including numerous threatened species. The Menindee Lakes play a prominent role in the early stages of native fish lifespan. The lakes system provides water for numerous towns, including Broken Hill, Menindee and Pooncarie. Due to the flat landscape that makes up the river, along with inconsistent rainfall, flows into the system at the end of the end of darling river are inconsistent. A significant feature of the lakes is the connection with the Lower Darling river via Weir 32, where "Flows into this section of the river support a range of agricultural and environmental assets" The Darling river has a prominent involvement in Aboriginal culture dating back over 13,000 years. This region is the traditional land of numerous different nations, though the most prominent group is the Barkinji people. Barkindji means people of the Barka (the river).
Precedent	There are significant short and long term factors that contributed to the conditions of the river system causing three mass kill events. Diagram of the lake and surrounding Darling system. An independent panel was commissioned by the Australian government to perform this analysis. The report provided for the Australian Government Minister for Agriculture and Water Resources will make up the majority of the events dissection. Discerning between ultimate causes and proximate causes for the event will provide a more articulate understanding of the context and event of the mass fish deaths. Ultimate causes: Large fish recruitment and spawning events Two large inflow events in 2012 and 2016 resulted in conventionally high biomass levels in Lake Pamamaroo & Menindee Weir pools. "The first was a sequence of high flow events spanning 2010-2012, which filled the Menindee Lakes . After a series of low flow years (2013-2015), in 2016 there was another single significant rainfall event that filled the Menindee Lakes" During high flow events, native fish move both downstream from the northern tributaries and upstream from the River Murray to greater proximity with the Menindee system. When full, the Menindee systems act as vast nurseries for fish. These inflows and high water levels in the years preceding the fish - death event caused a large influx of both algal and fish presence in the systems. Weather and Water management After inflow events in 2016, Lake Menindee was considered at complete water levels. In 2017 - 2018 water was released from Menindee into the lower darling. Drought conditions in western NSW developed from 2016 onward, this cumulatively caused the "two-year total Barwon–Darling inflows" to be the "lowest on record over the past 20 years." Furthermore: "As part of the regular management operations for the lakes, water was released down the lower Darling system and into the River Murray". Without any considerable in-flow events after 2016, alongside the diversion of water from the Menindee pools, weather levels began decreasing below Weir 32, effectively trapping remaining fish within the pools. Proximate causes / Late 20-18-2019: As conditions came to arrest water movements between the Menindee system, significant endogenous factors were also beginning to foster the environments that culminated in the 2018-2019 fish kill offs. As the independent assessment panel further notes: "Based on the flow and algal data available, it would be reasonable to assume that persistent thermal stratification occurred in the weir pool from approximately mid-October 2018".This stratification causes a major separation of conditions in the water table... "with high fish and algal biomass in the epilimnion (surface waters) and likely severely hypoxic or anoxic conditions in the hypolimnion (bottom waters)." This stratification led to significant differences in oxygen and temperature levels between the epilimnion and hypolimnion. Algae concentrations most significantly changed during this event, with WaterNSW algal sampling showing very low concentrations of algae between July–September 2018 (none-detected). By 24 November, biomass levels had increased to over 8mm3/L (red-alert level).
Incidents and result	"Over three separate events between 15 December 2018 and 28 January 2019, millions of native fish died along a 30- to 40-km reach of the Darling–Baaka River adjacent to the town of Menindee, New South Wales (NSW), in the weir pool between Weir 32 and the Menindee Lakes Main Weir (New South Wales Department of Primary Industries 2019)" Kills in the Darling: assessing the impact of the 2018–2019: mass fish kills on the fish communities The Independent Panel report referenced here (Vertessy, 2019) and the Australian Academy of Science report (Moritz, 2019) concur that the fish death events were caused by destratification of the pool upstream of Weir 32. The three major mortality events occurred on 16 December 2018 and the 6/19th of January 2019. The Independent assessment identifies three cool changes as the trigger for these two events. Alongside the final report, a preliminary report prepared by NSW Department of Primary Industries after the second fish death event concluded that observed air changes and the subsequent water temperature falls are responsible for initiating major fish kill events. December Between the 12th and 16 December a significant cool change disturbed the stratification layers containing distressed fish and algae and widely different chemical and physical conditions. Average water temperature at 60 cm depth decreased from 27.5 °C on the 12th to 23.1 °C on the 16th, alongside rainfall on the 14th and 15 December. The independent assessment panel notes... "This weather change likely triggered a mixing event that combined very low oxygen bottom waters with the surface waters where the fish were located." and.. "A change in conductivity that may be due to mixing of surface and bottom waters occurred in the early morning of 16 December 2018" This abrupt change altered the conductivity, temperature and oxygen saturations considerably, marking the start of the fish deaths that would occur following the 16th. The majority of deaths occurred near Weir 32 January Upstream from Weir 32 cool changes altered the maximum air temperature from 46 °C on January 4, 2019, to 28.5 °C on January 5. Strong winds and substantial rainfall also occurred, reducing the weather temperature from 30 C on the 4th to 26 C on the 6th. Similar changes occurred on and prior to the two fish kills that occurred in January as demonstrated in the previous event during December. Although these two events featured headfirst, "further broader-scale fish kills occurred throughout, 600 km of the Darling–Baaka River as disconnected refuge pools contracted and water quality deteriorated from June 2019 to March 2020." The exact number of fish deaths is unknown, though the report produced by Professor Rob Vertessy concluded that over a million fish may have died.

== Mining and resource extraction related incidents ==
=== Whitehaven Coal billion liter water theft (2016–2019) ===
Location	Whitehaven's Maules Creek mine is located 45 km southeast of Narrabri in north-east NSW within the Gunnedah Basin.
Site Description	Maules Creek coal mine Located within the Leard state forest, the site continues to operate on and within Gamilaraay land and cultural sites. Leard state forest is noteworthy for containing the "most intensive and intact strands of nationally listed and critically endangered Box-Gum Woodland remaining on the Australian continent" and the " largest area of remnant vegetation remaining in the Liverpool Plains". Leard state forest is home to 396 native species of plants and animals, 34 threatened species and numerous endangered ecological communities. As of 2015 "Maules Creek [was] the biggest coal mine under construction and one of the few tier-one, undeveloped coal deposits in Australia." The area expected to be impacted by the mine in its lifetime is approximately 2,177 ha. This consists of 1655 ha of forest and woodland and a further 413 ha of native grassland and 99 ha of exotic grassland.
Precedent	Open cut coal mining requires significant water usage to mediate toxic dust and fine particles produced by their operation. Approximately 250 liters of freshwater are required for every single ton of coal extracted and produced. As the CSIRO further elaborates, waters involvement in coal mining includes: transport of ore and waste in slurries and suspension; separation of minerals through chemical processes; physical separation of material such as in centrifugal separation; cooling systems around power generation; suppression of dust, both during mineral processing and around conveyors and roads; washing equipment; dewatering of mines; Whitehaven Coal specifically notes its use of water at Maules Creek site as: "On site, water is used to suppress dust, to wash the coal in the Coal Handling and Processing Plant (CHPP) and across other miscellaneous areas. Some water is lost through evaporation." As Whitehaven Coal's water management statement notes: "The Maules Creek mine’s primary external water source is a 3000ML High Security water licence from the Namoi River, which flows during high rainfall events and from Keepit Dam periodic releases." More specifically related to the incident: "Other site water sources include rainfall into the pit and licensed groundwater allocations."
Incident and result	Whitehaven Coal was found complacent in two alleged breaches of section 60A(2) of the Water Management Act 2000 by extracting water unlicensed between 2016 and 2019. Protester blocking mining equipment within Maules Mine Grant Barnes, Chief Regulatory Officer at the Natural Resources Access Regulator (NRAR), stated that "the mine is alleged to have failed to divert clean water from major streams on the Maules Creek site" This was accomplished through the construction of sediment dam (7/MC10) along with the operation of its Western Clean Water Diversion program to its own holding tanks, instead of nearby Back Creek. Notions suggests that Whitehaven did not take an active role in managing water resources its site was endowed with, instead choosing to use its private position as a primary benefactor of this resource. The court heard Principal Engineering Hydrologist at PSM, Doug Anderson statement that offense coincided with "the worst drought in living memory" and that the value of that water to the environment had significantly higher value then normal Justice Pain notes that the ability to prove damages equivalent to a greater fine was more difficult, were: "The prosecutor cannot prove to the requisite standard that the drought exacerbated actual harm to the environment" A Whitehaven spokesperson notes: "Whitehaven has previously publicly addressed aspects of NRAR’s investigation, including noting the complexity of the water management system in NSW and the fact that some of the alleged non-compliances concern practices widely observed in the NSW coal mining sector." Whitehaven Coal was fined AUD $200,000 for unlawfully extracting 1 billion liters of water in 2021. Large public anger emerged from the perceived lack of severity of this fine. The maximum fine for this level of offense is 2 million AUD.

=== Adani Abbot Point coal spill (2017) ===
Location	Caley Valley Wetlands
Site description	The Caley Valley Wetlands is a large coastal wetland ecosystem located ~25 km northwest of Bowen and south-east of Townsville. The wetland is designated to cover ~5,154 hectares and remains one of the only fully functioning wetland systems between Townsville and Bowen. The wetland exists amongst a greater amalgamation of 5 main wetland systems located within the Great Barrier Reef catchment. The Wetland contains over 40,000 birds, made up of over 145 different species. It provides a breeding habitat for at least 24 species, including the most northerly location for coastal nesting black swans. Location of the Valley Further ecosystem participants include: Saltwater crocodiles; Marine turtles; Dugong and Snubfin Dolphin; As Professor Callum Roberts (2013) describes, “The density of birds was astonishing, the highest I have ever seen in any wetland. It was immediately clear that this was an extraordinary haven for wildlife ” The location adjacent to the wetland is mostly owned by North Queensland Bulk Ports corporation. The wetland itself is designated as an Abbot Point State Development Area and is therefore owned by the Coordinator General. Abbot point is a significant export terminal for coal Bowen Basic Coalfields and located directly within the wetlands.
Precedent	Cyclone Debbie emerged as a significant tropical cyclone event in late March 2017. The strongest cyclone to strike Queensland since Marica in 2015, Cyclone Debbie was considered the deadliest cyclone to hit Australia since Fifi in 1991. As the cyclone moved south, the Queensland department of Environment and Science granted "Abbot Point Bulkcoal Pty Ltd a temporary emissions license (TEL) for the period 27 to 30 March 2017, to assist with site water management during and after TC Debbie" The TEL authorized total suspended solids (TSS) releases of up to 100 milligrams per litre (mg/L) into the Caley Valley Wetland.
Incident and result	Instead, "Adani has now admitted to the Queensland Government that they breached conditions of this license, exceeding their permitted pollution discharge limit to the ocean by more than 800 percent." This represents a breach of over 26 times the containment limit prescribed to Adani under their existing agreements with the Queensland Environmental authority. In the months preceding the runoff incident, government staff undertook a rapid assessment of the adverse effects the runoff created. The Caley Valley Wetland Monitoring Program Progress Report 2017 indicated that... "In April 2017 government staff undertook a rapid assessment of the wetland and found that although there were indications of recent flooding, there was little visual evidence of coal fines across the whole of the wetland, apart from a site immediately downstream of the licensed discharge point". The report concluded that in this instance, "this preliminary study found little evidence of contaminants in the surface sediments and waters of the Caley Valley wetland. Sediment samples collected in October 2018 and March 2019 showed that most samples contained trace or no coal fines". Queensland Department of Environmental Science has its own long-term monitoring program in the Caley Valley Wetland now implemented.

== Cultural heritage items ==
=== Djab Wurrung directions tree destruction (2018) ===
Location	Djab Wurrung country where it and lands surrounding Budja Budja (Halls gap) are under the custodianship of Djab Wurrung people.
Site description	The tree was located along a 12 km strip between the town of Buangor and Ararat. A direction or 'birthing' tree is a traditionally significant tree for Djab Wurrung peoples. As Djab Wurrung man Zellanach Djab Mara explains: "[such trees] comes from a time when mobs would mix a child’s placenta with the seeds of a tree, so it would grow with the child and become a place of significant spiritual value." "In the present day, many Djab Wurrung people believe such trees carry their bloodline and act as guardians." Aboriginal woman and Greens senator Lidia Thorpe expands the importance of such places for Djab Wurrung people in the continuation of living culture: "When we talk about sacredness within life – or any kind of sacredness – we’re talking about this particular place. It’s a particular place where women give birth. It’s a place where women’s business is conducted. And that’s what we talk about: where women prepare for the birth of children." Local landowner Mairi Anne Mackenzie said independent arborists had estimated the tree to be approximately 350 years old. Arborists for the Eastern Maar Aboriginal Corporation "have indicated that the tree in question is “highly unlikely” to pre-date European occupation". Furthermore, "Despite its age and majesty, extensive re-assessments did not reveal any characteristics consistent with cultural modification. It did not appear to have been altered by our peoples for usage in our cultural traditions".
Precedent	VicRoads and Major Road Projects Victoria, in attempting to reduce road accidents related to the particularly dangerous Western highway, maintain the necessity of expanding the highway to accommodate growing economic and social demands. Between 2012 - January 2022, there have been 156 motor vehicle incidents, including 17 fatalities and 93 people seriously injured along the highway. It is expected traffic will double by 2025.
Incident and result	In the preceding year, "Aboriginal landowners negotiated with the Victorian government to save around a dozen of 250 "culturally significant" trees from destruction." "As beautiful as it was, it wasn't deemed to have cultural values and there is dispute about that and we respect and understand that, but we've been guided by our knowledge holders and cultural experts," - Jason Mifsud, Chair of EMAC These claims are contested by other Djab Wurrung peoples. Representatives from the Djab Wurrung Heritage Protection Embassy filed three separate injunctions against Environment Minister Sussan Ley decision making in the matter. The first of which was successful in discarding Ms.leys original approval. Although the environment minister was required to reconsider her decision making, the commonwealth in mid 2019 eventually denied the cultural significance of the trees, setting the precedent for their destruction later in the year. Protecting culturally threatened sites has been the focus of many Djab Wurrung people, forming an embassy in proximity to the trees in mid-2018. On 26 October 202012 police forces issued a move order to the remaining protestors surrounding the site. Approximately 50 people were arrested, in an amalgamation of charges related to failing to comply with the Chief Health Officer directions and obstructing police. The tree was destroyed on 26 October 2020.

== See also ==
- Environmentalism in Australia
- Conservation in Australia
