= Election Funding Authority of New South Wales =

Australian government agency

Statutory body overview
- Dissolved: 2014
- Superseding Statutory body: NSW Electoral Commission
- Jurisdiction: New South Wales
- Headquarters: Level 25, 201 Kent Street, Sydney
- Minister responsible: Premier of New South Wales
- Statutory body executive: Colin Barry, Chairperson
- Parent department: Department of Premier and Cabinet
- Website: www.efa.nsw.gov.au

The Election Funding Authority of New South Wales was the agency of the Government of New South Wales charged with administering the Elections Funding Act 1981. The Authority formerly distributed public funding for the purposes of campaigning by candidates in state elections and handled claims for payments from the state's Political Education Fund. On 1 December 2014 it was abolished and its functions made the responsibility of the NSW Electoral Commission.

Candidates for public office in New South Wales previously had obligations under the Election Funding, Expenditure and Disclosures Act 1981 to declare political donations, as well as expenditure on campaigning to the authority. Disclosures were required to be made by 20 October each year.

The authority was the responsibility of the Department of Premier and Cabinet.

== See also ==
- Elections in Australia
- List of New South Wales government agencies
