= Office of Environment & Heritage =

Government department in New South Wales, Australia

Office of Environment and Heritage

Agency overview
- Formed: 4 April 2011
- Preceding agencies: Department of Environment, Climate Change and Water; Department of Environment and Conservation; Department of Environment and Climate Change
- Dissolved: 1 July 2019
- Superseding agency: Department of Planning, Industry and Environment
- Type: Department
- Jurisdiction: New South Wales
- Minister responsible: Hon. Gabrielle Upton MP, Minister for the Environment and Minister for Heritage
- Parent agency: Department of Planning and Environment
- Child agencies: Anzac Memorial Building Trustee; Centennial Park and Moore Park; Environment Protection Authority; Environmental Trust; Sydney Living Museums; Jenolan Caves Reserve Trust; Lord Howe Island Board; Luna Park Reserve Trust; Marine Parks Authority; NSW National Parks & Wildlife Service; Natural Resources Commission; NSW Scientific Committee; Parramatta Park Trust; Royal Botanic Gardens & Domain; Sustainability Programs Division; Taronga Conservation Society; UrbanGrowth NSW; Western Sydney Parklands Trust; WSN Environmental Solutions; Zoological Parks Board
- Website: www.environment.nsw.gov.au

The New South Wales Office of Environment and Heritage (OEH), a former division of the Government of New South Wales between April 2011 and July 2019, was responsible for the care and protection of the environment and heritage, which includes the natural environment, Aboriginal country, culture and heritage, and built heritage in New South Wales, Australia. The OEH supported the community, business and government in protecting, strengthening and making the most of a healthy environment and economy within the state. The OEH was part of the Department of Planning and Environment cluster and managed national parks and reserves.

Following the 2019 state election, the agency was abolished and most functions of the agency were assumed by the Department of Planning, Industry and Environment with effect from 1 July 2019. The heritage functions were assumed by the Department of Premier and Cabinet, but would be transferred back to the Department of Planning and Environment on 1 April 2022.

== Structure ==
Until its 2019 abolition, the Chief Executive of the Office of Environment and Heritage was Anthony Lean; who reported to the then Minister for the Environment and Minister for Heritage, the Hon. Gabrielle Upton, MP.

The Office consisted of five functional areas:

- NSW National Parks & Wildlife Service (NPWS) – managed, conserved and cared for more than 7 million hectares (17×10^{6} acres) of land in national parks and reserves
- Regional operations – delivered integrated and customer focused services at the regional and local level to strengthen communities and partnerships across the state
- Heritage – provided an integrated approach to conserving Aboriginal and non-Aboriginal heritage, worked with the community to list items on the State Heritage Register, declared Aboriginal Places and register state shipwrecks
- Policy – provided policy advice and leading the development of strategic policy within the Office and across the government.
- Science – provided scientific evidence and knowledge to underpin environmental decision making, regulation and service delivery

== History ==
Following the election of the O'Farrell government at the 2011 state election, the functions of the Department of Environment, Climate Change and Water (DECCW) were broken up with its responsibilities split between the new Office of Environment and Heritage and the residual functions managed by the Industry, Innovation and Investment Division of the Department of Trade and Investment, Regional Infrastructure and Services. The OEH was managed under the direction of the Department of Premier and Cabinet until 2014, when the Baird government changed the reporting arrangements so that the OEH reported to the Department of Planning and Environment.

Following the 2019 state election, the Office was abolished and most of its functions assumed into the Environment, Energy and Science Group of the newly formed Department of Planning, Industry and Environment (DPIE). The heritage functions were assumed by the Heritage Branch within Department of Premier and Cabinet, known as Heritage NSW.

=== Former departmental responsibilities ===
The former department was responsible for:

- management of flora and fauna
- promotion of environmentally sustainable consumption and production
- protection of the state's cultural heritage, particularly Aboriginal cultural heritage
- regulation of air and water quality, noise, chemicals, radiation and waste disposal

The organisation had strong links with the Sydney Catchment Authority.

==== Former structure ====
The department was headed by Director-General Lisa Corbyn and headquartered in Sydney, with offices across the city and state.

The Office consists of seven functional areas:

- Climate Change, Policy and Programs Group
- Environment Protection and Regulation Group
- Parks and Wildlife Group
- Botanic Gardens Trust
- Corporate Services Division
- Culture and Heritage Division
- Scientific Services Division

Although an agency of the Government of New South Wales, the Office includes a number of independent boards and committees; for example, the management of the Botanic Gardens is overseen by the Botanic Gardens Trust, and the powers of the Environment Protection Authority, as exercised by the Authority to investigate or prosecute government agencies, are formally vested in an independent board. Threatened species determinations are made by an Independent Scientific Committee. A number of advisory councils have been established to allow community members to have a say in the management of parks and reserves.

==== Environment protection ====
The NSW Environment Protection Authority (EPA) was established in February 2012 as a statutory authority. The EPA has an independent governing Board and is the primary environmental regulator for NSW. It carries out environmental protection work in a variety of areas including air and water quality, environmental incident management, contaminated land, noise, coal seam gas, native forestry, dangerous goods, hazardous waste, chemicals and pesticides, and waste and resource recovery.

==== Parks and wildlife ====
The Parks and Wildlife division is referred to in the department's external communications by its pre-merger name, the National Parks and Wildlife Service (NPWS). The NPWS manages over 660 protected areas in the state, including Kosciuszko National Park, Sydney Harbour National Park, Royal National Park and the Blue Mountains National Park.

With the national parks estate covering around 10 per cent of New South Wales, the department is a significant player in debates over land management in the state. The NPWS has a significant amount of responsibility for fire management in the state, and is often the target of criticism when Sydney – the so-called "city in a national park" – is threatened by bushfire. The Carr Labor government sought to significantly increase the size of the national parks estate. This was despite funding constraints, meaning that funding per unit area has fallen in recent years. A large number of parks and reserves in the NPWS estate lack detailed plans of management and fire management strategies. As a land manager, the NPWS must also address pest management issues. The status of wild horses in Kosciuszko National Park and deer in Royal National Park is particularly contested, with some park users viewing these introduced species as having heritage value.

==== Botanic Gardens Trust ====
The Botanic Gardens Trust manages four parkland areas in and around metropolitan Sydney including The Royal Botanic Gardens, The Domain, Blue Mountains Botanic Garden and the Australian Botanic Garden Mount Annan.

==== Other agencies ====
The department is mirrored at a national level by the Australian Department of the Environment. Some protected areas in metropolitan Sydney are protected by other agencies, including local councils, the Centennial Park Trust, the Sydney Olympic Park Trust, and the Australian Government's Sydney Harbour Federation Trust. Elsewhere in the state are protected areas managed by the Marine Parks Authority of New South Wales and the State Parks of New South Wales.

== Criticism ==
New South Wales Office of Environment and Heritage was subject to criticisms for handling of Sirius Building heritage status.

== Notable personnel ==
Notable people who have worked for the Office of Environment and Heritage include:

- Jocelyn Dela-Cruz, Principal Environmental Scientist
- Erin Roger, scientist

== See also ==
- Australasian Fire and Emergency Service Authorities Council
- Waste management in Australia
