= Menindee Lakes =

Shallow freshwater lakes in New South Wales

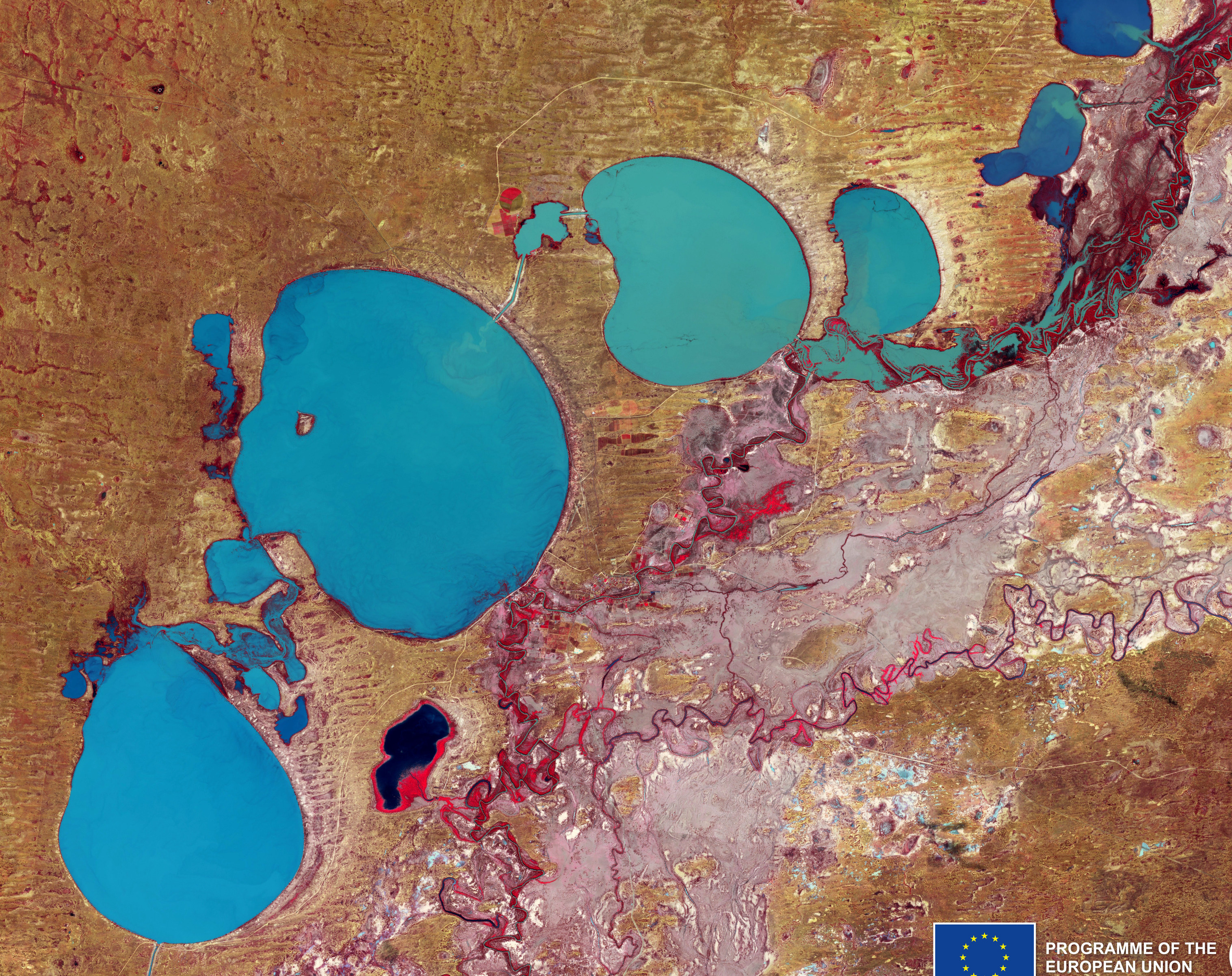
- Satellite photo of Menindee Lakes

- Location within New South Wales
- Location: Far West, New South Wales
- Coordinates: 32°20′59″S 142°22′08″E
- Lake type: Ephemeral fresh water
- Primary inflows: Darling River
- Primary outflows: Darling River
- Catchment area: 273,229 square kilometres (105,494 sq mi)
- Basin countries: Australia
- Managing agency: Murray Darling Basin Authority
- Designation: National park: Kinchega
- Built: 1949
- First flooded: 1968
- Max. length: 16 kilometres (9.9 mi) (Lake Menindee only)
- Max. width: 14 kilometres (8.7 mi) (Lake Menindee only)
- Surface area: 47,500 hectares (117,000 acres)
- Average depth: 7 metres (23 ft)
- Water volume: 1,731,000 megalitres (1.403×10^{6} acre⋅ft)
- Surface elevation: 60 metres (200 ft) AHD
- Settlements: Menindee

The Menindee Lakes is a system of 9 large, but relatively shallow lakes in outback Australia, located in south-west New South Wales on the Darling River, about 200 kilometres (120 mi) upstream of its junction with the Murray River. The Darling is fed by nine major tributary river systems flowing from south-east Queensland and north and central NSW. The town of Menindee is close to the lakes and Sunset Strip township is on the northern shore of Lake Menindee. The nearest city is Broken Hill.

There are 4 main lakes in the system:

- Lake Wetherell
- Lake Pamamaroo
- Lake Menindee (the largest lake, also known as Lake Minandichi)
- Lake Cawndilla

The lakes rely on replenishment when the Darling overflows its banks. The NSW Government modified the lakes (completed 1968) to improve their storage capacity for farming, recreation, mining and urban water supply and to help manage Darling floods. In the 1960s, governments decided to use some of the lakes as water storage, building the large Main Weir to divert water into lakes Pamamaroo, Tandure and Bijijie. Levees, block dams and channels were built to regulate the flow of water in the system. There is relatively little information on the flooding regimes of the lakes before they were dammed in the 1960s but they were undoubtedly highly productive and important wetland systems where many fish were spawned.

The Menindee Lakes Water Storage Scheme supplies water to Broken Hill, the lower Darling and to water users along the Murray River in New South Wales, Victoria and South Australia under the Murray-Darling Basin Agreement. Seven of the lakes have been incorporated in an artificially regulated overflow system providing both for flood mitigation and as storage for domestic use, livestock and irrigation downstream. The lakes are also important for waterbirds.

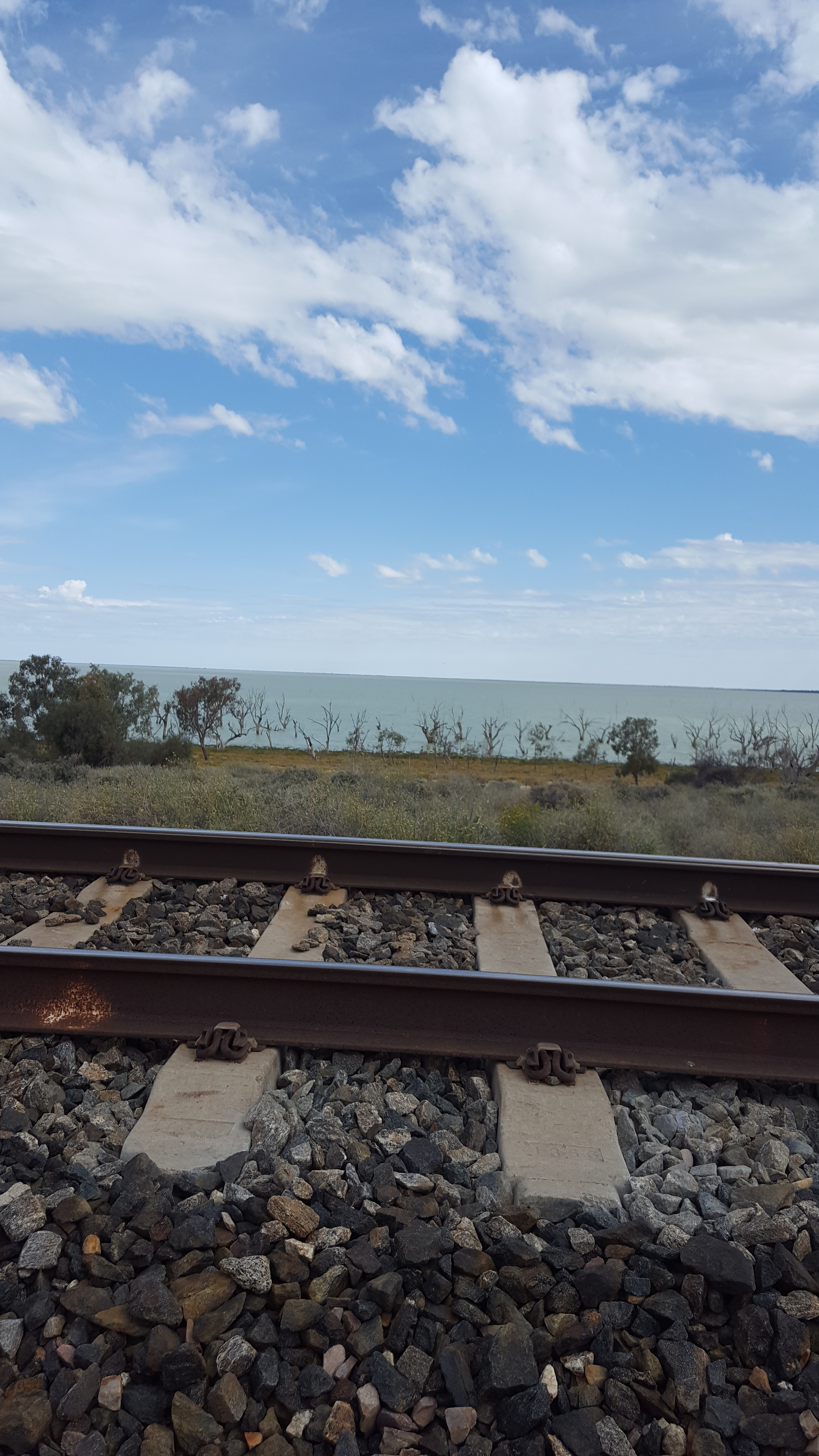
Lake Menindee viewed from the Broken Hill railway line near Sunset Strip.

Research published in 2018 found that the food webs have changed in a way that suggests that the ecological resilience of the system has declined.

The lakes were filled to capacity in 2021 with Lakes Cawndilla and Menindee filling completely in early September meaning that the system was filled to over 98 per cent capacity with water flowing into Lake Speculation for the first time since 2012.

== People of the Barka ==
The first people living around the Menindee Lakes area are known as the Barkindji or Paakantyi. The original inhabitants gained Native Title over the area in 2015, but it didn't include control of water use on the Darling (Barka) River. In January 2019, ABC News wrote the Chairperson of the Menindee Barkandji Elders Group, Patricia Doyle, called for better water management in the area. "The government needs to adopt a whole-system approach to water management in the Darling River," she said.

== Fish deaths ==
There have been periods of mass fish deaths in the Lakes. Fish kill data from the NSW Fisheries Department shows the size of the sudden deaths, after 1960 to be much greater. Between December 2018 and January 2019, and again in late 2022 and early 2023, there were at least 5 mass fish deaths reported along a 40-km stretch of the Darling River, downstream of the Menindee Lakes. These are often described as the "Menindee Lakes fish kill". It is estimated at least a million fish died, most affected were bony herring, Murray cod, silver perch and golden perch. The Australian government report on the deaths determined three main causes: inadequate water flow in the Darling River, poor water quality and a sudden change in temperature.

Another report, commissioned by the federal opposition leader Bill Shorten MP, concluded the deaths were the result of low water flows and hot temperatures causing blue-green algal blooms. The algae depleted oxygen in the river, depriving the fish of necessary oxygen to live. The report also stated, "The conditions leading to this event are an interaction between a severe (but not unprecedented) drought and, more significantly, excess upstream diversion of water for irrigation. Prior releases of water from Menindee Lakes contributed to lack of local reserves."

== Location and features ==
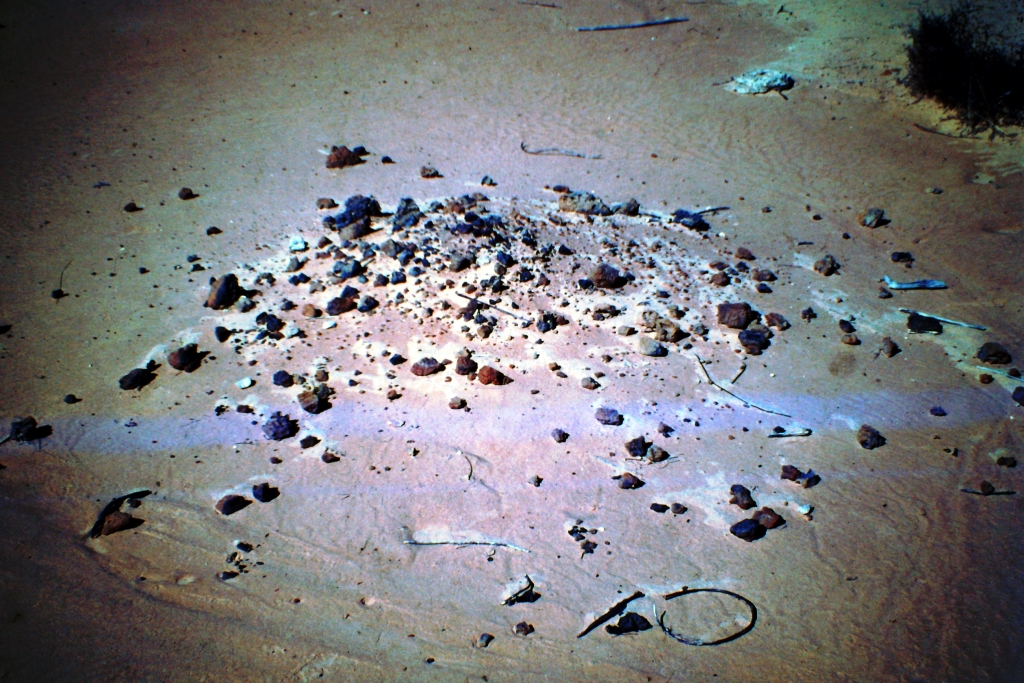
Surface find of Aboriginal camp. Menindee Lakes, N.S.W., 1976.

The lakes are located approximately 110 kilometres (68 mi) south-east of Broken Hill in the semi-arid zone on grey clay and duplex soils, and siliceous and calcareous sands of the far west region.

The lakes range in size from 103–15,900 hectares (250–39,290 acres). The largest are Lakes Menindee, Wetherell, Pamamaroo and Cawndilla. These four, with Tandure, Bijijie and Balaka, are part of the Menindee Lakes Water Storage Scheme, with Cawndilla and Menindee also within the Kinchega National Park. Lakes Nettlegoe, Kangaroo, Stir Tank, New and Malta are unregulated. Lake Tandou is managed as irrigated cropland and is no longer subject to flooding.

The shallow margins of the overflow lakes are studded with dead black box trees while the shores are dominated by bluerod and sandhill canegrass.

=== Menindee Lakes Storages ===
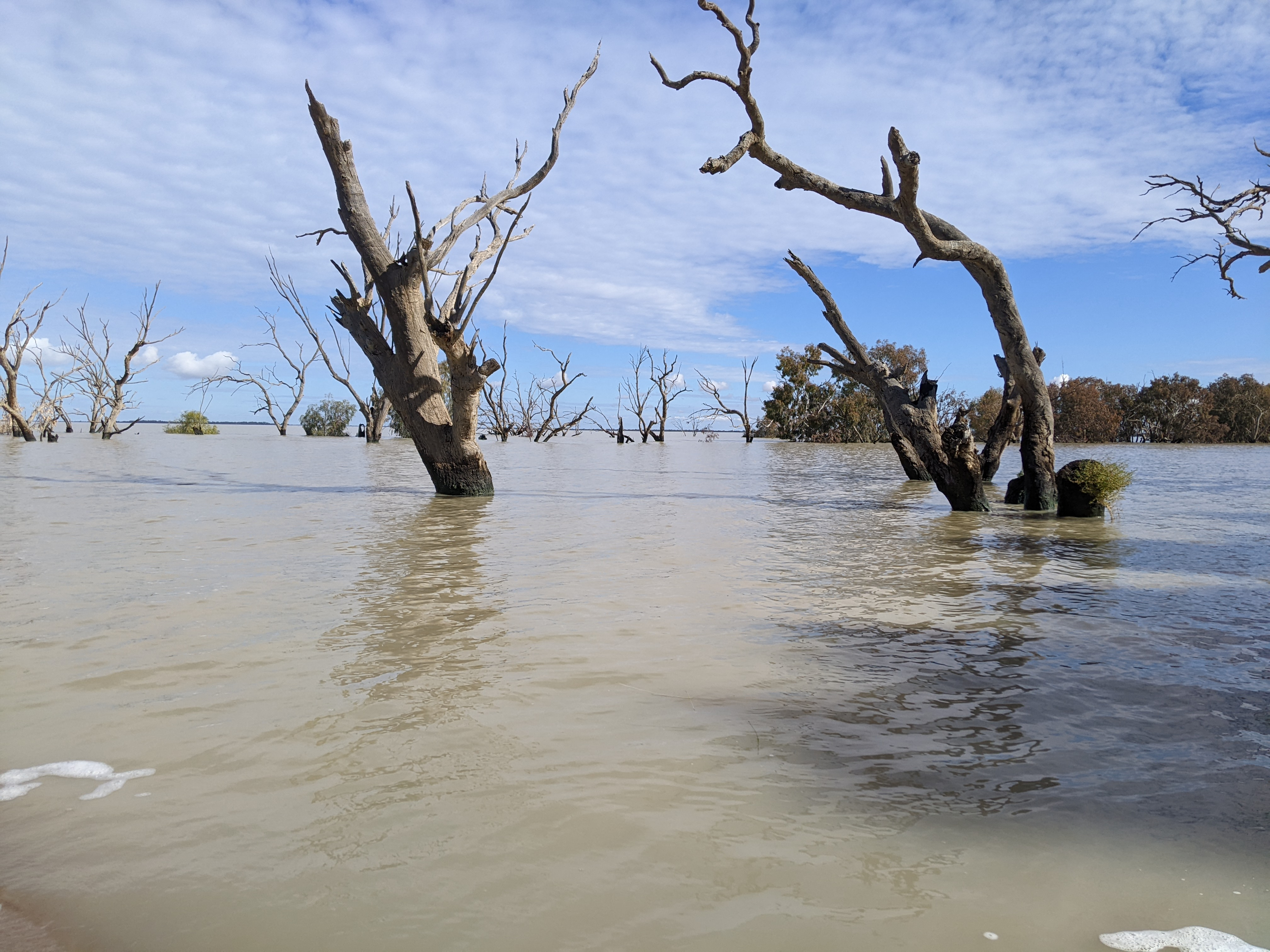
After the floods of 2022

The Menindee Lakes Storages is a major gated dam, including multiple weir and lake impoundments and a concrete spillway, with six vertical lift gates, across the seven lakes that form part of the Menindee Lakes Water Storage Scheme. The lakes were originally a series of natural depressions that filled during floods. As the flow receded the floodwaters in the natural depressions drained back into the Darling River.

In 1949, work began on building dams, weirs, levees, canals and regulators to catch and retain floodwaters. Major works were completed in 1960 and final completion was in 1968, with electrical upgrades in 2007. The scheme was built by the New South Wales Water Conservation and Irrigation Commission, to manage river flows, town water supplies and other domestic requirements, irrigated agriculture, industry, and flood mitigation. It has become increasingly important for regulating environmental flows.

Construction of the retaining walls required 103 cubic metres (3,600 cu ft) of rock fill, 18 metres (59 ft) high and 95 metres (312 ft) long. The average water depth is 7 metres (23 ft) and, at 100% capacity, the dam walls hold back 1,731,216 megalitres (61,137.3×10^{6} cu ft) of water at an average of 60 metres (200 ft) above sea level. The surface area of the lakes within the scheme is 47,500 hectares (117,000 acres) and the combined catchment area is 273,226 square kilometres (105,493 sq mi). The uncontrolled concrete spillway with six vertical lift gates is capable of discharging water at 850 cubic metres per second (30,000 cu ft/s).

=== Birds ===
Some 423 km^{2} (163 sq mi) of the lakes and their surrounds, with the exception of Lake Tandou, have been identified by BirdLife International as an Important Bird Area (IBA) because it has supported up to 222,000 waterbirds, including over 1% of the world populations of freckled ducks, grey teals, pink-eared ducks, red-necked avocets, sharp-tailed sandpipers and red-capped plovers. Other waterbirds sometimes using the lakes in large numbers are Australasian shovellers, Australian shelducks, pied cormorants, yellow-billed spoonbills, Eurasian coots and white-headed stilts. Other species recorded in the IBA include Australian bustard, black and pied honeyeaters, chirruping wedgebill and grey falcon.

== See also ==
- List of lakes of Australia

== Gallery ==
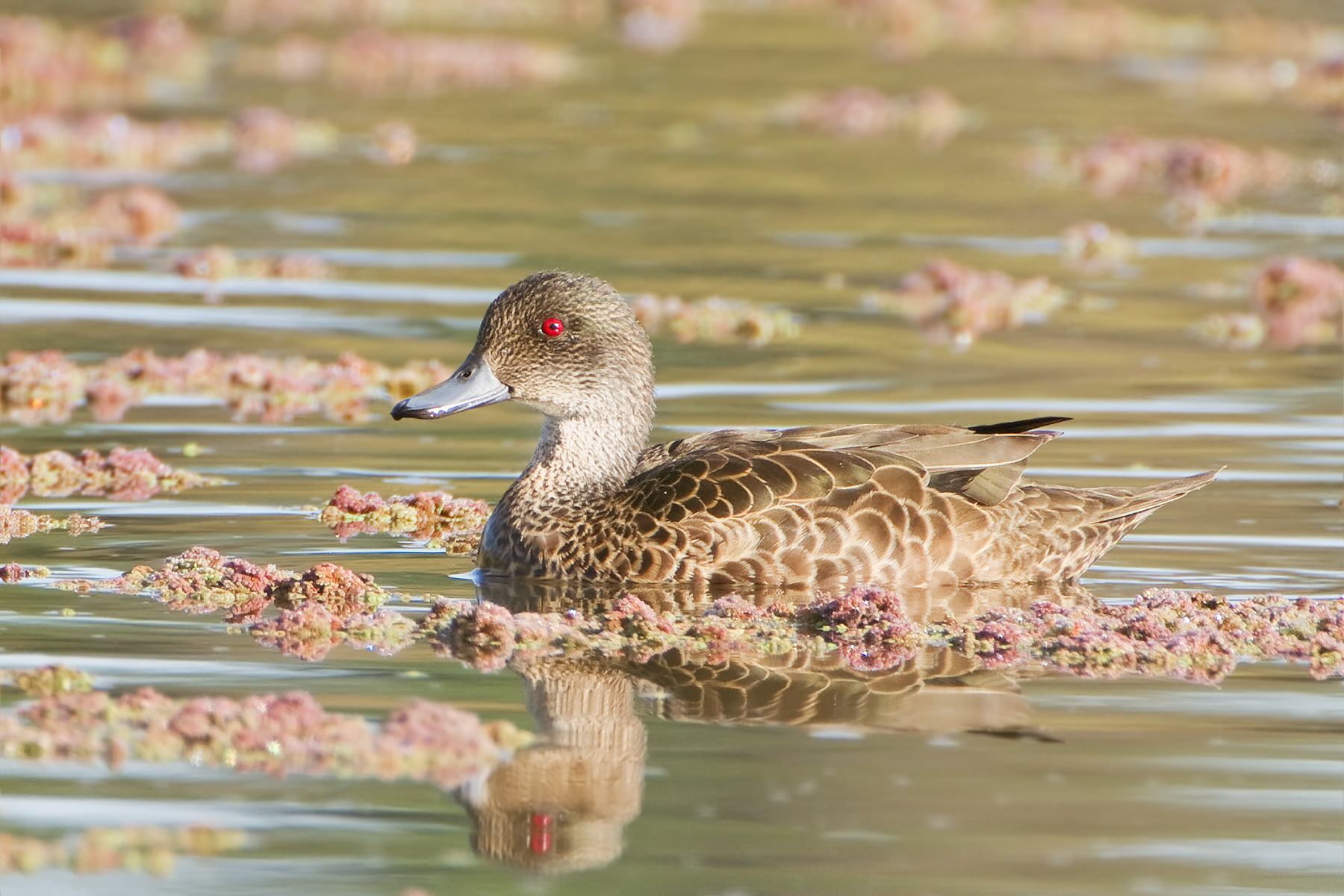
The lakes are important for grey teals

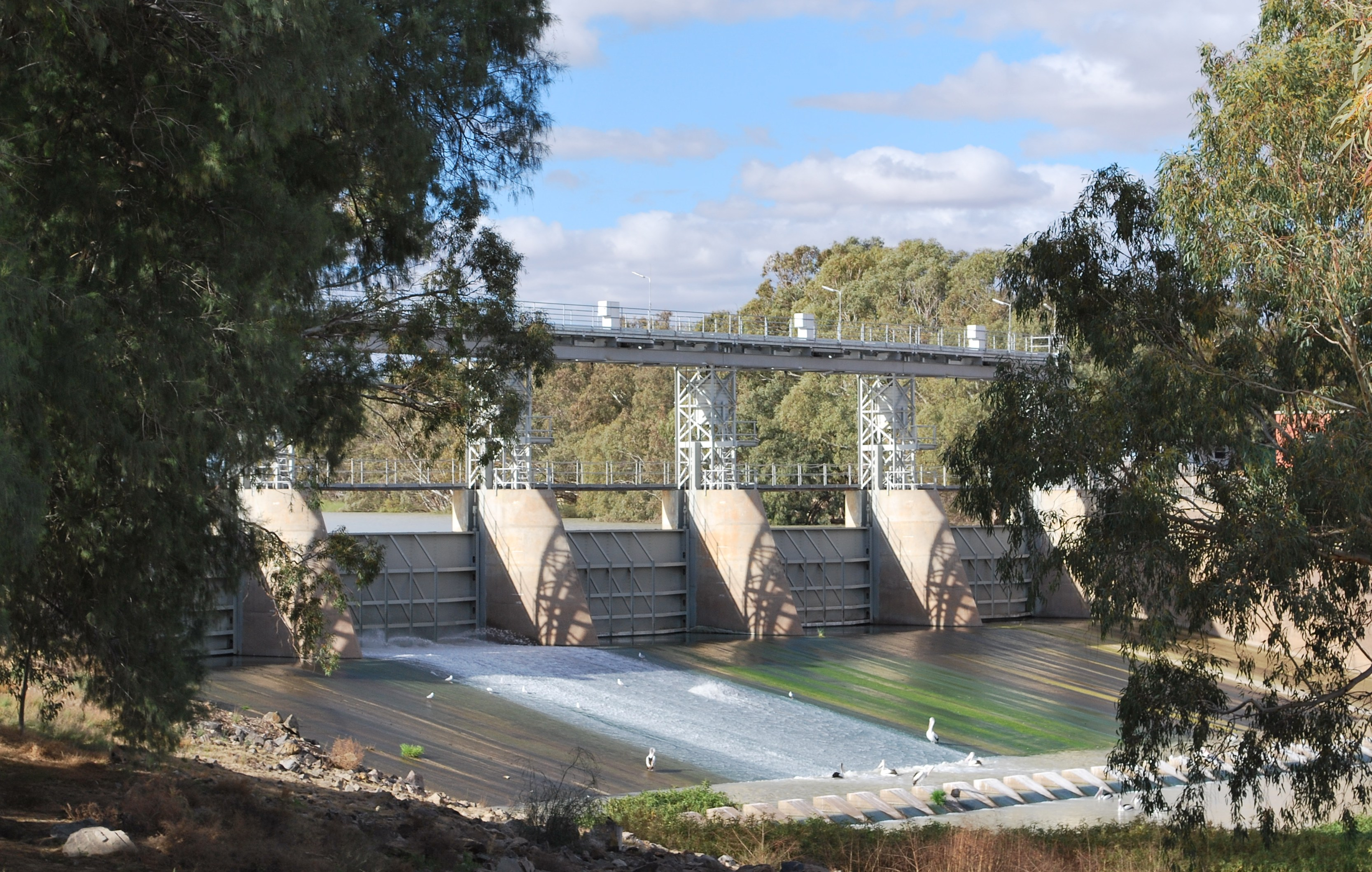
Main Weir on the Darling River at the Menindee Lakes, 2009.

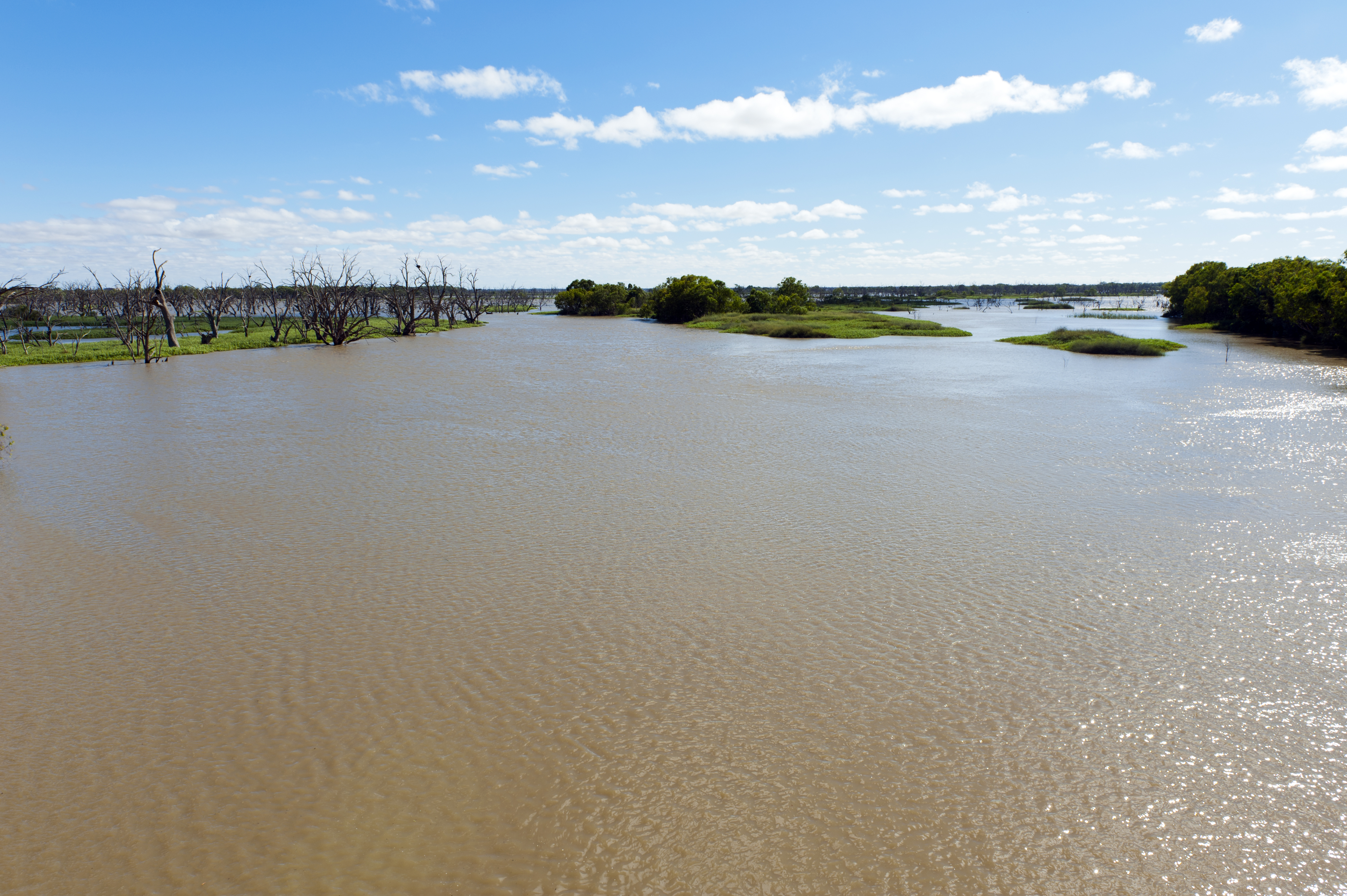
Menindee Lakes viewed from the Main Weir, 2012.

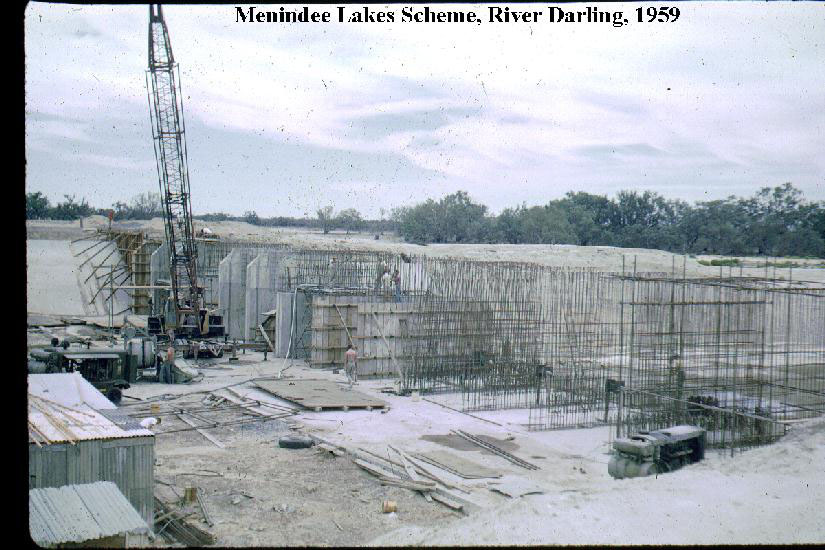
Dam construction, 1959.

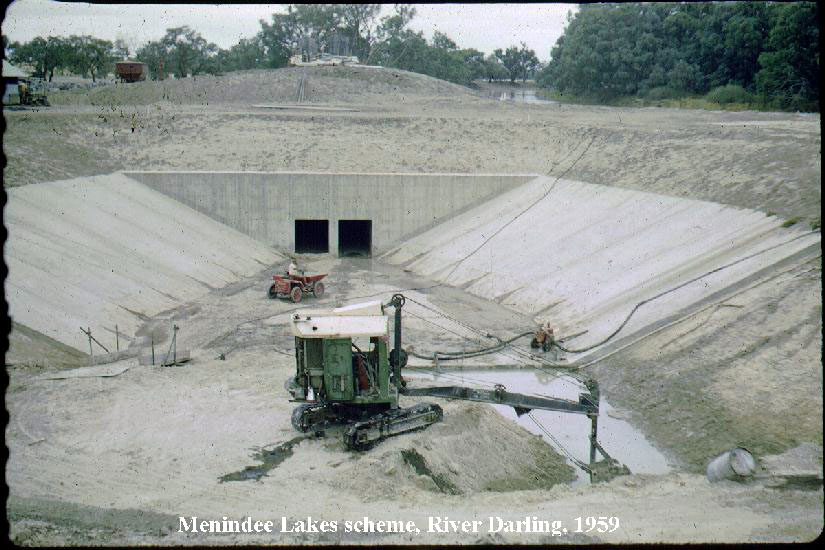
Construction at Menindee Lakes Scheme, 1959.
