= Aboriginal Affairs NSW =

Agency overview
- Formed: 1 January 1982 (Ministry of Aboriginal Affairs); 4 April 2011 (Aboriginal Affairs NSW)
- Preceding agencies: Department of Aboriginal Affairs (1995–2011); Office of Aboriginal Affairs (1988–1995); Bureau of Aboriginal Affairs (1988); Ministry of Aboriginal Affairs (1982–1988)
- Headquarters: 201 Coward Street, Mascot, Sydney
- Minister responsible: Minister for Aboriginal Affairs
- Agency executive: Shane Hamilton, Deputy Secretary, Aboriginal Affairs
- Parent agency: Premier's Department
- Key documents: Aboriginal Land Rights Act, 1983 (NSW); Aboriginal Languages Act, 2017 (NSW)
- Website: aboriginalaffairs.nsw.gov.au

Aboriginal Affairs NSW (AANSW) is an agency of the Premier's Department in the Government of New South Wales. Aboriginal Affairs NSW is responsible for administering legislation in relation to the NSW Government policies that support Indigenous Australians in New South Wales, and for advising the Minister for Aboriginal Affairs and Treaty, David Harris.

== History ==
=== Early administrative period ===
The first body of the NSW Government specifically dealing with Aboriginal affairs was the Board for the Protection of Aborigines (BPA; also known as the Aboriginal Protection Board), which followed practice of "protection" taken by the Australian colonies when it was established by an Executive Council minute of 2 June 1883. The board had six members appointed by the Governor of New South Wales, with the Inspector-General of Police serving ex officio as chairman. The board was reconstituted by the Aborigines Protection Act 1909, which took effect on 1 June 1910, and was placed under the supervision of the Colonial Secretary and his Department (from 1959 the Chief Secretary), with its stated purpose being "to exercise a general supervision and care over all matters affecting the interest and welfare of Aborigines, and to protect them against injustice, imposition and fraud".

The board was dissolved and the Aborigines Welfare Board (AWB; frequently referred to as the Aboriginal Welfare Board in later sources) was constituted under the Aborigines Protection (Amendment) Act 1940, which commenced on 14 June 1940. This board, like its predecessor, had power over the administration and placement of Aboriginal communities, the education of Aborigines and their general welfare. A. W. G. Lipscomb, who had been appointed as Superintendent of Aborigines Welfare of the Board for Protection in February 1939 (then in the BPA), was confirmed in the position on 31 May 1940.

The AWB was dissolved on 2 June 1969 by the Aborigines Act 1969, to be replaced by the Aborigines Welfare Directorate, within the Department of Child Welfare and Social Welfare (Department of Youth and Community Services from 1 February 1974).

The Directorate was abolished on 1 July 1975, with most of its functions being transferred to the Commonwealth Department of Aboriginal Affairs. The remaining state responsibilities were then transferred to the new Aboriginal Services Branch which operated within the Department of Youth, Ethnic and Community Affairs (renamed Department of Youth and Community Services from 14 May 1976).

=== Ministerial period ===
The first Minister for Aboriginal Affairs, Frank Walker, was appointed by the Labor Government of Neville Wran on 2 October 1981 and a Ministry of Aboriginal Affairs was established on 1 January 1982. The ministry had responsibilities for advising the Government on "how and where land rights for Aboriginal people might be granted" and for the provision of services to Aboriginal communities. On 15 April 1988, the Ministry was abolished and its responsibilities were transferred to the new Bureau of Aboriginal Affairs within the Premier's Department. The Bureau was renamed to the Office of Aboriginal Affairs by June 1988 and was charged with the administration of the Aboriginal Land Rights Act, 1983 (NSW) and the administration of Aboriginal Land Councils. On 1 July 1993, the Office of Aboriginal Affairs was established as an administrative office independent of the Premier's Department responsible to the Minister for Aboriginal Affairs. On 6 April 1995 the Office was abolished and was transferred to the Department of Aboriginal Affairs. On 1 July 2009 the department was abolished as an independent body and was subordinated to the new Department of Human Services. On 4 April 2011, the department was renamed Aboriginal Affairs NSW and was transferred to the Department of Education and Communities within the Office of Communities. In July 2015 the Office of Communities was abolished but Aboriginal Affairs remained within the parent Department of Education.

In 2019 Aboriginal Affairs was moved into the Department of Premier and Cabinet.

=== Agency executives ===
- Secretary, Board for the Protection of Aborigines
  - A. C. Pettitt, 1909–1939
- Superintendent of Aborigines Welfare
  - A. W. G. Lipscombe, 1939–1953
  - M. H. Saxby, 1953–1958
  - H. J. Green, 1959–1969
- Director of Aboriginal Welfare
  - Ian Mitchell, 1969–1975
- Secretary of the Ministry of Aboriginal Affairs
  - Pat O'Shane, 1981–1986
  - Neville Perkins, 1987–1988
- Director, Bureau/Office of Aboriginal Affairs
  - Keith Kocken, 1988–1993
- Director General, Office of Aboriginal Affairs
  - Mike Stewart, 1993–1995
- Director General, Department of Aboriginal Affairs
  - Mike Stewart, 1995
  - Geoff Scott, 1995–2000
  - Linda Burney, 2000–2003
  - Jody Broun, 2003–2010
  - James Christian, 2010–2011
- General Manager, Aboriginal Affairs NSW
  - James Christian, 2011–2012
- Head of Aboriginal Affairs
  - Jason Ardler, 5 June 2012 – December 2019
  - Lillian Gordon, January 2020 – July 2022
- Deputy Secretary, Aboriginal Affairs NSW
  - Shane Hamilton, July 2022 – present

== Agency responsibilities ==
In addition to its policy and advisory roles, Aboriginal Affairs NSW:

- "Assist communities to establish partnerships that recognise and affirm the position and power of Aboriginal people as the first peoples of NSW".
- "Reinforce robust and effective Aboriginal community governance".
- "Support Aboriginal peoples preparedness for future opportunities to improve their economic and social prosperity; and reinforce Aboriginal peoples’ confidence and expertise in their own cultures."
