= John Lee (civil servant) =

Australian businesspeople (born 1964)

John Lee (born 22 August 1964) is the CEO of Australian Sailing, the peak body for sailing activities across the nation as well as oversight of the highly successful Olympic programme. Lee is a Director of Cross River Rail Delivery Authority (Queensland) and Zenergy Mindset and wellbeing. Lee is the former CEO of the Sydney Roosters and the South Sydney Rabbitohs, the Tourism and Transport Forum (the national advocacy body for the top 200 visitor economy organisations)

Before this time he was a senior Australian bureaucrat, former head of the NSW Department of Premier & Cabinet, Department of Commerce, Ministry of Transport and the State Transit Authority.

He was a Commissioner on the Australian Sports Commission having been appointed in 2011 until 2015. His involvement included membership of the Governance and Executive Performance Sub-Committee and the Finance & Audit Sub-Committee. His community work has included serving on the Advertising Standards Board (2006-2014) and the Mary Mackillop Foundation (2005-2010).

On graduating from De La Salle College, Cronulla in 1981, Lee successfully completed a Bachelor of Education at the University of Wollongong. Whilst studying he held the position of President of the University Union and was an elected member of the Wollongong University Council. At the same time he completed his Sports Medicine qualifications and rose to be the Head Trainer for the Cronulla-Sutherland Sharks under Jack Gibson and Alan Fitzgibbon. Later he successfully coached junior representative teams for the Parramatta Eels winning the 1992 SG Ball Cup competition.

Upon completing his degree he taught at secondary schools in Western Sydney. During the first term of the Carr Government, he worked for Treasurer Michael Egan and then transitioned to work for the State Rail Authority in the lead up to and during the Sydney 2000 Olympics as the General Manager of Communications and Marketing.

He was Managing Director of Westbus and the National Bus Company in the early part of the 2000s .

In April 2003, he became the Director General of Transport for NSW. During his time in transport he was integral in reforming the funding and contractual management of public transport services in NSW through competitive tendering.

In October 2008, Lee was appointed Director-General of the Department of Premier & Cabinet following a period as Director General of the Department of Commerce. Lee left the position soon after the appointment of the incoming Premier Kristina Keneally. In November 2010, Lee was appointed CEO of peak industry body, the Tourism & Transport Forum.

In 2015, Lee was appointed CEO of the South Sydney Rabbitohs, moving to occupy the same role with the Sydney Roosters from February 2016 until March 2017. In April 2017 he was appointed to the Cross River Rail board.
