= New South Wales Environment Protection Authority =

NSW Environment Protection Authority
Agency overview
- Formed: February 2012
- Jurisdiction: New South Wales
- Headquarters: 59 Goulburn Street, Sydney
- Employees: approximately 500
- Annual budget: $158.1million
- Minister responsible: Penny Sharpe, Minister for the Environment
- Parent department: Department of Climate Change, Energy, the Environment and Water
- Website: www.epa.nsw.gov.au

The NSW Environment Protection Authority (EPA) is an independent statutory authority that sits in the Environment portfolio as part of the Planning and Environment cluster. It was established as an independent governing board in February 2012 separate from the Office of Environment & Heritage. The EPA is the state’s primary environmental regulator, working with businesses, government, community and environment groups to manage and reduce pollution, waste and adverse impacts on the environment.

The EPA's vision is a "Healthy Environment, Healthy Community and Healthy Business". The vision goes to the heart of the objectives under the Protection of the Environment Administration Act 1991 (POEA Act):

- to protect, restore and enhance the quality of the environment in NSW, having regard to the need to maintain ecologically sustainable development;
- to reduce the risks to human health and prevent the degradation of the environment.

== History ==
The EPA was established originally in 1991 as an independent agency under the Protection of the Environment Administration Act.

Between 2003 and 2012, the EPA was incorporated into the Department of Environment and Conservation. Following a significant pollution incident at Kooragang Island in Newcastle in August 2011, an independent review recommended that an EPA be re-formed as an independent agency.

The agency was subsequently re-established in February 2012 as a statutory authority with an independent governing board.

The EPA has offices in Albury, Armidale, Bathurst, Broken Hill, Coffs Harbour, Dubbo, Grafton, Griffith, Kempsey, Newcastle, Parramatta, Queanbeyan, Sydney and Wollongong.

== Activities of the EPA ==
The EPA regulates activities that can impact the environment and human health, including:

- Air, water and noise pollution
- Waste and resource recovery
- Contaminated land
- Dangerous goods
- Chemicals and hazardous materials
- Pesticides
- Radiation and solaria (tanning units)
- Native forestry
- Coal seam gas projects.

The EPA Strategic Plan 2017–21 lists the criteria against which the EPA must perform.

=== Notable investigations ===
- 2024: Sydney asbestos mulch crisis

== Legislation and compliance ==
The Environment Protection Authority has responsibilities and powers under a range of NSW environmental legislation.

=== Acts administered by the NSW EPA ===
Act	Date
Contaminated Land Management Act 1997	1997
Dangerous Goods (Road and Rail Transport) Act 2008	2008
Forestry Act 2012	2012
National Environment Protection Council (New South Wales) Act 1995	1995
Ozone Protection Act 1989	1989
Pesticides Act 1999	1999
Protection of the Environment Administration Act 1991	1991
Protection of the Environment Operations Act 1997	1997
Radiation Control Act 1990	1990
Recreation Vehicles Act 1983	1983
Waste Avoidance and Resource Recovery Act 2001	2001

The Protection of the Environment Operations Act 1997 (POEO Act)
Protection of the Environment Operations Act 1997 (POEO Act) is the key piece of environment protection legislation administered by the EPA.

The object of the Act is to achieve the protection, restoration and enhancement of the quality of the NSW environment. The Act repealed and consolidated a number of existing Acts to rationalise, simplify and strengthen the regulatory framework for environmental protection in NSW.

== See also ==
- Waste management in Australia
