= Department of Climate Change, Energy, the Environment and Water (New South Wales) =

Department of the New South Wales Government

Department overview
- Formed: 1 January 2024
- Preceding Department: Department of Planning and Environment (2019–2023)
- Type: Department
- Jurisdiction: New South Wales
- Ministers responsible: The Hon. Penny Sharpe MLC, Minister for the Environment Minister for Climate Change Minister for Energy Minister for Heritage; The Hon. Rose Jackson MLC, Minister for Water
- Department executive: Anthony Lean, Secretary
- Website: www.nsw.gov.au/departments-and-agencies/dcceew

The New South Wales Department of Climate Change, Energy, the Environment and Water (DCCEEW) is a department of the New South Wales Government, responsible for climate change and energy action, water management, environment and heritage conservation and protection.

== History ==
Government agencies for the protection and conservation of natural and built resources in New South Wales have existed since the appointment of the first Minister for Conservation, the Hon. Captain Bill Dunn, MLA in 1946.

In 2003, the Department of Environment and Conservation was formed following the merger of the Environment Protection Authority, the National Parks and Wildlife Service, the Botanic Gardens Trust, and Resource NSW. The Department of Environment and Conservation was later known as the Department of Environment and Climate Change (DECC) and Department of Environment, Climate Change and Water (DECCW). This department contained the Office of Water, formed from the Department of Water and Energy dissolved in 2009; other parts and responsibilities of the Department of Water and Energy were transferred to the Division of Minerals and Energy in Department of Industry & Investment.

Following the election of the O'Farrell government at the 2011 state election, the functions of the DECCW were broken up with its responsibilities split between the new Office of Environment and Heritage and the residual functions managed by the Industry, Innovation and Investment Division of the Department of Trade and Investment, Regional Infrastructure and Services. The OEH was managed under the direction of the Department of Premier and Cabinet until 2014, when the Baird government changed the reporting arrangements so that the OEH reported to the Department of Planning and Environment.

Following the 2019 state election, the Office was abolished and most of its functions assumed into the Environment, Energy and Science Group of the newly formed Department of Planning, Industry and Environment (DPIE). The heritage functions were assumed by the Heritage Branch within Department of Premier and Cabinet, known as Heritage NSW. Heritage NSW was transferred back to the Department of Planning and Environment (renamed from DPIE) on 1 April 2022.

=== Formation ===
Following a media release on 18 August 2023, it was announced that, as of 1 January 2024, the department would be split into two new entities: the Department of Climate Change, Energy, the Environment and Water, and the Department of Planning, Housing and Infrastructure. The former would also be joined by the Office of Energy and Climate Change, which was until then a part of the New South Wales Treasury.

=== Groups ===
The following groups are included in the Climate Change, Energy, the Environment and Water cluster, administered by the Department:

- NSW Climate and Energy Action
- Environment and Heritage
- Water
- National Parks and Wildlife Service
- New South Wales Environment Protection Authority
- EnergyCo
- Biodiversity Conservation Trust
- Air Quality
- AdaptNSW

=== Controversies ===
In late 2024, Ahmed Alabadla was investigated by DCCEEW amid concerns he had breached the NSW Public Service Code of Ethics and Conduct, which requires all public servants to not act in a way that casts doubt on a person's ability to discharge their duties with "impartiality and professionalism". It is alleged that Mr Alabadla repeatedly posted content online expressing admiration for the actions of Hamas, a body funded by Israel and listed as a terrorist organisation under Australia's Criminal Code Act. On 31 July 2024, Mr Alabadla posted a photo of Ismail Haniyeh, the leader of Hamas, with the caption: "We’ll all be following this road of sacrifice and martyrdom." In August 2024, Mr Alabadla organised a talk in Marrickville NSW entitled "Resistance is Justified when Palestine is Occupied". He previously organised "a webinar on an energy embargo of Israel, and boycotting companies dealing with Israel from an energy perspective".

It is not clear if Ahmed was found to have breached the Code. However, as the Australian Government subsequently sanctioned 2 Israeli ministers for the crimes against humanity and war crimes committed by Israel against the civilians in Gaza, it is unlikely that Ahmed would be disciplined for what he had done, particularly as he was an employee of a State Government, who is not involved in the foreign affairs and defence of Australia.

== See also ==
- List of New South Wales government agencies
- Department of Planning and Environment
