= Sunset Strip, New South Wales =

Sunset Strip New South Wales
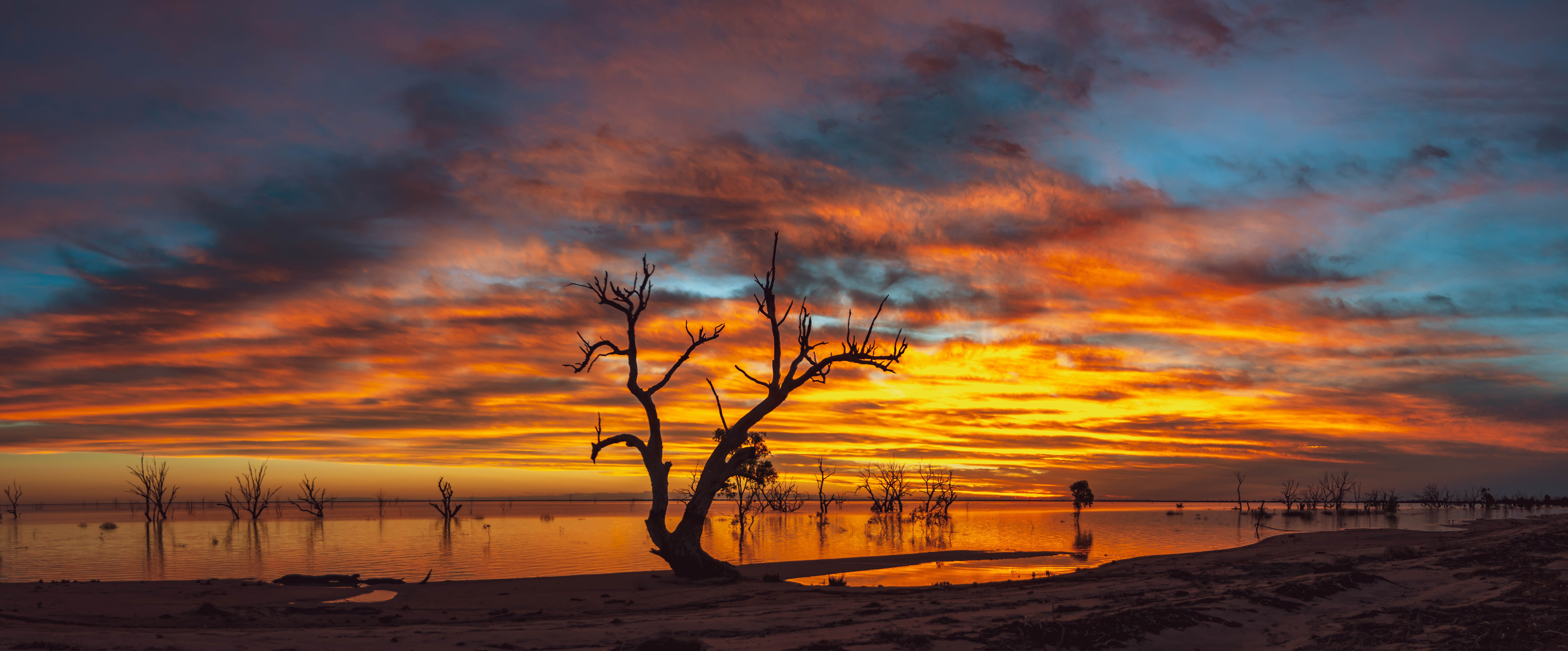
- Lake Menindee shoreline, Sunset Strip

- Coordinates: 32°16′32″S 142°19′40″E
- Population: 42 (2021 census)
- Established: 1962
- Postcode(s): 2879
- LGA(s): Central Darling Shire
- State electorate(s): Barwon
- Federal division(s): Parkes

Sunset Strip is a township on the northern shore of Lake Menindee in the far west of New South Wales, Australia. It is located in the Central Darling Shire about 20 km northwest of Menindee and about 90 km from Broken Hill. At the 2021 census, the town had a population of 42. It was named for the sunsets observed over the shoreline of the lake.

The town was established in the early 1960s with house blocks mostly taken up by people from Broken Hill for holiday houses, attracted by the boating, fishing and other activities on the lake.
