= Erin Roger =

Canadian ecologist

Dr Erin Roger
- Born: Ottawa, Ontario, Canada
- Scientific career
- Fields: Citizen Science; Environmental Monitoring, Evaluation and Reporting; Science-policy interface
- Workplaces: NSW Office of Environment and Heritage; CSIRO; Atlas of Living Australia

Erin Roger (born in Ottawa, Ontario, Canada) is the biosecurity sector lead at the Atlas of Living Australia (ALA). Previously she was a senior scientist working for the New South Wales Office of Environment and Heritage (OEH) in the area of Citizen Science and Monitoring, Evaluation and Reporting.

== Education ==
Roger completed her Bachelor of Science with Honours at Acadia University in Nova Scotia Canada in 2002. She graduated from the University of New South Wales in 2010 with a PhD in ecology. Roger's PhD research examined how wildlife populations are impacted by roads and how this impact varies at different spatial scales.

== Background ==
Roger is an ecologist interested in the science-policy interface and how to facilitate the uptake of scientific research into the policy process. At the OEH and CSIRO she worked in the area of citizen science, developing and guiding citizen science programs to involve the community in data collection and monitoring projects. Her particular interest is exploring if citizen science can benefit environmental monitoring and policymaking.

Previously Roger worked in the climate change impacts and adaptation section within the Office of Environment and Heritage. The section works on both science and policy related projects in order to quantify projected climate impacts for both humans and other biota and assist in the uptake of adaptation actions across government and the private sector.

Roger completed a secondment from OEH where she was employed as a postdoctoral fellow at Macquarie University, working on a National Climate Change Adaptation Research Facility (NCCARF) funded project. The aim of the research was to examine the current extent of environmentally suitable habitat for a suite of naturalised, but not yet invasive non-native plants within Australia and to evaluate how projected changes in climate may alter these patterns in the coming decades.

She joined CSIRO in 2019 and then the ALA in 2021. As of February 2025, she is the Biosecurity Sector Lead for the ALA, maintaining her focus on citizen science.

== Research and publications ==
Total citations 190 H-index 6

- Roger, E., Laffan, S.W., Ramp, D. (2007). Habitat selection by the common wombat (Vombatus ursinus) in disturbed environments: implications for conservation of a common species. Biological Conservation 137: 437-449.
- Pollock, B.; Roger, E. (2007). "Trace elements status of moose and white-tailed deer in Nova Scotia". Alces. 43: 61–78. Archived from the original on 21 September 2014 – via HighBeam Research.
- Ramp, D., Roger, E. (2008). Frequency of animal-vehicle collisions in New South Wales. In 'Too Close for Comfort'. D. Lunney, A Munn and W. Meikle (Eds.). Royal Zoological Society of New South Wales, Sydney, Australia.
- Roger, E., Ramp, D. (2009). Incorporating habitat use in models of fauna fatalities on roads. Diversity and Distributions 15: 222-231.
- Roger, E., Laffan, S.W., Ramp, D. (2011). Road impacts a tipping point for wildlife populations in threatened landscapes. Population Ecology 53: 215-227.
- Eldridge, D.J, Bowker, M., Maestre, F., Roger, E., Reynolds, J., Whitford, W. (2011). Impacts of shrub encroachment on ecosystem structure and functioning: towards a global synthesis. Ecology Letters 14: 709-722.
- Ramp, D., Gates-Foale, C., Roger, E., Croft, D.B. (2011). Suitability of acoustics as non-lethal deterrents for macropodids: the influence of origin, delivery, and anti-predator behaviour. Wildlife Research 38: 408-418.
- Roger, E., Ramp, D., Bino, G. (2012). Linking habitat suitability and road mortalities across geographic ranges. Landscape Ecology 27:1167-1181.
- Laffan, S.W., Ramp, D., Roger, E. (2013). Using endemism to assess representation of protected areas- the family Myrtaceae in the Great Blue Mountains World Heritage Area. Journal of Biogeography 40: 570-578.
- Hughes, L., Downey, P., Duursma Englert, D., Gallagher, R., Johnson, S., Leishman, M., Roger, E, Smith, P., Steel, J .(2013). Prioritising naturalised plant species for threat assessment: developing a decision tool for managers. National Climate Change Adaptation Research Facility, Gold Coast, pp. 69.
- Duursma DE, Gallagher RV, Roger E, Hughes L, Downey PO, et al. (2013). Next-Generation Invaders? Hotspots for Naturalised Sleeper Weeds in Australia under Future Climates. PLoS ONE 8(12): e84222. doi:10.1371/journal.pone.0084222
