= The Cabinet Office (New South Wales) =

Government agency in Australia

Agency overview
- Formed: 1 July 2023
- Preceding agency: New South Wales Department of Premier and Cabinet
- Jurisdiction: New South Wales
- Minister responsible: Chris Minns MP, Premier of New South Wales
- Agency executive: Kate Boyd PSM, Secretary
- Parent department: Premier's Department
- Website: www.nsw.gov.au/the-cabinet-office

The Cabinet Office of New South Wales is an agency of the NSW Government. It was first established on 14 June 1988 with the purpose of providing independent advice and support to the premier and cabinet of New South Wales. Its role extends to the coordination of government policies across various departments, and addressing issues of political sensitivity such as greenhouse gas emissions, alcohol misuse, and illicit drugs. In 2006, then-Director General Roger Wilkins resigned, leading to a significant reevaluation of government administration. The agency was abolished in 2007 and merged with the Department of Premier and Cabinet, before a subsequent demerger and reestablishment of an independent Cabinet Office in 2023.

Following Wilkins' departure, a review conducted by Dr Michael Vertigan AC and Nigel Stokes, known as the "Vertigan Report" or formally the "New South Wales audit of expenditure and assets report," recommended structural changes. In 2007, the Cabinet Office merged with the Premier's Department to form the New South Wales Department of Premier and Cabinet.

The office was reestablished in 2023 following the election of Chris Minns as Premier. Its current Secretary is Kate Boyd PSM, who was appointed in March 2024, having served on an interim basis since December 2023. In its current iteration, the office is tasked with:

- Leadership and coordination on strategy and policy across government, driving action on key government priorities.
- Providing independent policy, legal, and governance advice to the Premier and Cabinet, including matters related to the National Cabinet.
- Stewardship of the NSW Cabinet system to support effective government decision-making.

The office is organised into three groups:

- Office of General Counsel
- Social Policy and National Reform
- Economic and Environmental Policy

== See also ==
- Premier's Department
- List of New South Wales government agencies
