= Valuer General of New South Wales =

Position in New South Wales, Australia

- Incumbent; Sally Dale since 1 June 2023
- Department of Planning, Housing and Infrastructure
- Appointer: Governor of New South Wales
- Term length: 7 years
- Constituting instrument: Valuation of Land Act 1916
- Formation: 1916
- First holder: Edward Johnstone Sievers
- Deputy: Deputy Valuer General
- Salary: AU$370,025
- Website: https://www.nsw.gov.au/departments-and-agencies/department-of-planning-housing-and-infrastructure/nsw-valuer-general

The Valuer General of New South Wales oversees the land valuation system of New South Wales.

The Valuer General is responsible for standards and policy in relation to the land valuation system and determining compensation for the acquisition of properties and monitors the quality of the value of land and services to the community by Property NSW. The Office of the Valuer General provides day-to-day support to the Valuer General. The Valuer General reports administratively to the Minister for Lands and Water and the Secretary of the Department of Planning, Housing and Infrastructure. Since 20 January 2020, the Office of the Valuer General and Valuation Services (a division of Property NSW) were merged to form Valuer General NSW (VG NSW).

The incumbent Valuer General, Sally Dale, was appointed on 1 June 2023.

== Joint Standing Committee on the Office of the Valuer General ==
The Joint Committee on the Office of the Valuer General of the Parliament of New South Wales scrutinises the work done by the Valuer General and their office.

== List of Valuers General ==
Order	Valuer General	Term start	Term end	Notes
1	Edward Johnstone Sievers	11 August 1916	31 March 1927	
–	??? (acting)	31 March 1927	26 August 1927	
2	G.H. Legge	26 August 1927	28 September 1934	
–	??? (acting)	28 September 1934	26 October 1934	
3	Stanley Augustus Giraud	26 October 1934	1 January 1947	
–	Victor Gordon Rush (acting)	1 January 1947	5 April 1947	
4	Victor Gordon Rush	5 April 1947	18 November 1950	
5	Rudolph Oscar Rost	19 November 1950	2 December 1961	
6	Herbert William Eastwood	2 December 1961	3 September 1974	
7	Frank Bird	3 September 1974	11 November 1980	
8	Ian Beatty	11 November 1980	13 March 1990	
9	Peter Cunningham	14 March 1990	19 September 1991	
–	Garry Bardsley Kemp (acting)	20 September 1991	8 October 1991	
(9)	Peter Cunningham	9 October 1991	20 October 1991	
–	Garry Bardsley Kemp (acting)	21 October 1991	7 November 1994	
(9)	Peter Cunningham	8 November 1994	31 October 1995	
–	Garry Bardsley Kemp (acting)	1 November 1995	14 November 1995	
(9)	Peter Cunningham	15 November 1995	17 September 1998	
–	Kerry William Lister (acting)	18 September 1998	6 October 1998	
(9)	Peter Cunningham	7 October 1998	4 July 1999	
–	Kerry William Lister (acting)	5 July 1999	19 July 1999	
(9)	Peter Cunningham	20 July 1999	31 August 2003	
10	Philip Western	1 September 2003	31 August 2014	
–	Simon Gilkes (acting)	1 September 2014	October 2015	
11	Simon Gilkes	October 2015	October 2018	
–	Michael Parker (acting)	October 2018	18 October 2019	
–	Paul Chudleigh (acting)	18 October 2019	20 January 2020	
12	Dr David Parker	20 January 2020	October 2022	
–	Josh Ethington (acting)	October 2022	31 May 2023	
13	Sally Dale	1 June 2023	present	
