= Natural Resources Access Regulator =

Water regulation authority in New South Wales

The Natural Resources Access Regulator (NRAR) is the independent water regulator in New South Wales, responsible for enforcing the state’s water laws.

== History ==
=== 2017–2018 ===
NRAR was established in 2017 under the Natural Resources Access Regulator Act 2017 (NRAR Act) to address the need for a dedicated body to oversee water compliance in NSW. The creation of NRAR was part of a broader effort to enhance the transparency and effectiveness of water regulation in the state.

NRAR was established following Ken Matthews’ investigation into water management and compliance conducted in 2017. The Matthews report was commissioned in response to the 2017 ABC Four Corners program Pumped, which contained allegations of water mismanagement in the Barwon-Darling region of NSW.

The Government accepted the Matthews Report recommendations in full. Following the report, it was decided that new policy should be implemented. This resulted in the Water Reform Action Plan (WRAP) being put into place. A key component of the WRAP was to establish an independent water compliance authority. NRAR was established to fulfil this action, and the organisation commenced operations on 30 April 2018.

=== 2018–present ===
From April 2018 onwards, NRAR was given sole responsibility for enforcement of water management legislation in NSW. Prior to NRAR, compliance functions were split between the NSW Department of Climate Change, Energy, the Environment and Water, formerly DPI Water, and WaterNSW.

== Structure ==
NRAR is a NSW Government law enforcement agency, which sits within the NSW Department of Climate Change, Energy, the Environment and Water (DCCEEW).

NRAR’s independent board leads its strategic directions, compliance and enforcement functions. The board is appointed by and reports to the Minister for Water. Any directions by the minister must be made in accordance with the provisions of the NRAR Act. NRAR’s Board has been chaired by Craig Knowles since inception.

The regulator's day-to-day operations are led by its Chief Regulatory Officer (CRO) and executive. NRAR’s CRO position has been held by Grant Barnes since the agency was established.

== Activities ==
The vision of NRAR is to ensure "sustainable and fair water regulation for NSW." The agency enforces New South Wales water laws to ensure that the environment, communities and industries all receive their fair share.

NRAR regulates the taking of water, the building and use of water management works, how water is used and activities that take place on waterfront land. The operations of NRAR are supported by various teams specialising in compliance, investigations, education, and outreach.

One of the key ways NRAR monitors NSW for potential breaches of the water laws is by using remote sensing technology.

When addressing non-compliance, the regulator makes use of a tiered framework referred to as the pyramid approach. In this model, the severity of responses escalates with the increasing impact of non-compliance as one progresses up the pyramid.

Since 2019, the agency has been notable for initiating numerous prosecutions and influencing behavioural changes in NSW.

== Legislation ==
NRAR’s current responsibilities are governed by legislation including the NRAR Act, the Water Management Act 2000, the Water Act 1912 and associated regulations.
