= NSW Electoral Commission =

New South Wales Electoral Commission

Agency overview
- Formed: October 2006
- Preceding agency: State Electoral Office
- Jurisdiction: New South Wales
- Employees: 236 (2023–24)
- Annual budget: $192.82 million (2024)
- Ministers responsible: Chris Minns, Premier of New South Wales; John Graham, Special Minister of State
- Agency executive: Rachel McCallum, Electoral Commissioner
- Key documents: Electoral Act 2017; Constitution Act 1902; Local Government Act 1993; Electoral Funding Act 2018; Lobbying of Government Officials Act 2011
- Website: www.elections.nsw.gov.au

Logo used until 2018

The NSW Electoral Commission is a statutory agency with responsibility for the administration, organisation and supervision of elections in New South Wales. It reports to the Premier's Department and the Cabinet Office.

== Responsibilities ==
The NSW Electoral Commission is responsible for the administration, organisation and supervision of elections in New South Wales for state government, local government, industrial and Aboriginal organisations, as well as registered clubs and statutory bodies. It also manages the enrolment of electors and prepares electoral rolls. It also regulates the electoral environment in New South Wales, investigating possible offences and enforcing breaches of electoral, funding and disclosure, and lobbying laws

The Electoral Districts Redistribution Panel determines electoral boundaries conducting a redistribution, which provides for an approximate equal number of electors in each electoral district with a margin of allowance of plus or minus 10% of the average enrolment. The panel is made up of the Electoral Commissioner, in conjunction with a Judge of the Supreme Court and the Surveyor-General, who review and consider advice prior to determining electoral boundaries. To help carry out its functions, legislation allows the Redistribution Panel to use the staff of the NSW Electoral Commission. Electoral boundaries are reviewed after every second election or more frequently when required under legislation.

The Commission is accountable to the Joint Standing Committee on Electoral Matters of the New South Wales Parliament.

== History ==
Until October 2006, the Commission was known as the State Electoral Office.

The Commission was initially responsible for the administration of the Parliamentary Electorates and Elections Act 1912 until the Electoral Act 2017 came into force. The Commission's work is guided by the Electoral Act 2017, Electoral Regulation 2018, Local Government Act 1993, Local Government (General) Regulation 2021, Constitution Act 1902, Electoral Funding Act 2018, Electoral Funding Regulation 2018, Lobbying of Government Officials Act 2011, Lobbying of Government Officials (Lobbyists Code of Conduct) Regulation 2014, Aboriginal Land Rights Act 1983, City of Sydney Act 1988, Industrial Relations Act 1996, Registered Clubs Act 1976, Privacy and Personal Information Protection Act 1998, Government Information (Public Access) Act 2009, Public Finance and Audit Act 1983, Government Sector Employment Act 2013, and the Government Sector Finance Act 2018.

In December 2021, technical failures in the iVote online voting system during the 2021 local elections led the NSW Supreme Court to void results in three Local Government Areas and require the elections to be re-run. In March 2022, the NSW Electoral Commission announced that it would not use the iVote system for the 2023 state election. Advocates for blind and low-vision people subsequently accused the Commission of unlawful discrimination over the removal of the accessible voting platform.

== See also ==
- Elections in Australia
- List of New South Wales government agencies
