= Premier's Department =

New South Wales government department

New South Wales Premier's Department

Agency overview
- Formed: 1 July 2023
- Preceding agency: Department of Premier and Cabinet
- Jurisdiction: New South Wales
- Headquarters: 52 Martin Place, Sydney, New South Wales, Australia
- Employees: 687 (2010)
- Ministers responsible: Chris Minns MP, Premier of New South Wales; David Harris MP, Minister for Aboriginal Affairs; Sophie Cotsis MP, Minister for Industrial Relations; Jodie Harrison MP, Minister for Women; Michael Daley MP, Attorney General
- Agency executive: Simon Draper, Secretary
- Child agency: The Cabinet Office (since 1 July 2023)
- Website: www.nsw.gov.au/premiers-department

The New South Wales Premier's Department, a department of the New South Wales Government, is responsible for leading the New South Wales public sector and delivering on the government's commitments and priorities. The department provides administrative support that enables the cabinet to identify, design and implement a coordinated policy and legislative agenda. The department consults and collaborates with other New South Wales government departments, the federal government, local government, business and the community to ensure adequate responses to public needs.

The Department is led by its Secretary, presently Simon Draper, who reports to the Premier, and in absence, the Deputy Premier. The Premier is assisted in administration of the portfolio by the Minister for Aboriginal Affairs, the Minister for the Arts, and the Minister for Youth.

On 1 July 2023, the Department of Premier and Cabinet was split into the Premier’s Department and The Cabinet Office, reverting to the way it was before 2007.

== Agency activities ==
The Premier's Department s directly responsible for the administration and implementation of government reform agenda through policy and project support. The department also plays a key coordinating role in disaster management, delivery of infrastructure such as major projects and industry and business development. Premier and Cabinet also manages workforce reforms, employee relations and essential services to support the government of the day, such as ministerial services, parliamentary counsel, cabinet secretariat and policy support.

The Department is responsible for investigating various matters as directed by the Premier and the agency Secretary.

=== Current structural groups and divisions ===
As of April 2021, the Department of Premier and Cabinet is divided into five groups: the Strategy and Delivery Group; the Transformation Group; the Community Engagement Group; Office of the General Counsel; and the People Group. Each group comprises a number of branches (in the People Group, teams). These groups are responsible for a number of functional areas, agencies and cabinet committees.

The five branches of the Community Engagement Group are: Employee Relations; Aboriginal Affairs NSW; Create NSW; Heritage NSW; State Archives Records Authority (SARA); and the Sydney Living Museums. Heritage NSW will be transferred to the Department of Planning and Environment on 1 April 2022.

=== Premier and Cabinet cluster ===
NSW Government agencies are broadly organised into eight groups, referred to as clusters. The following agencies are included in the Premier and Cabinet cluster, administered by the Department:

==== Executive agencies ====
- Office of the Governor
- Art Gallery of New South Wales
- Australian Museum
- Election Funding Authority of New South Wales
- Greater Sydney Commission
- Heritage Council of New South Wales
- Independent Commission Against Corruption
- Independent Pricing and Regulatory Tribunal
- Infrastructure NSW
- Library Council of New South Wales
- Museum of Applied Arts and Sciences
- Natural Resources Commission
- New South Wales Electoral Commission
- New South Wales Ombudsman
- Office of the Inspector of the Law Enforcement Conduct Commission
- Parliamentary Counsel's Office
- Public Service Commission
- Resilience NSW
- Sydney Opera House Trust

==== Non-executive agencies ====
- Aboriginal Affairs NSW
- Create NSW (incorporating the previous Arts NSW and Screen NSW)

=== Agency history ===
In 2006 the New South Wales Government commissioned an inquiry into government administration by Dr Michael Vertigan AC and Nigel Stokes, entitled New South Wales audit of expenditure and assets report or more commonly the Vertigan Report.

Prior to 2007 separate agencies existed, entitled the Premier's Department of New South Wales and the New South Wales Cabinet Office, the latter established in 1988. Premier Morris Iemma merged the two agencies into the new Department of Premier and Cabinet under the direction of Robyn Kruk after the 2006 resignation of the Director General of the Cabinet Office, Roger Wilkins, and replacing the long-term Director General of Premier's Department, Col Gellatly, who served under Premier Carr.

In 2008, following the resignation of Premier Iemma, Nathan Rees replaced Kruk with John Lee, a senior public servant in the New South Wales Department of Transport and brother of Michael Lee, a former Labor Federal Minister and Councillor of the City of Sydney. In June 2009, Rees announced a restructure of the New South Wales Government and the creation of 13 super departments aimed at delivering better government services. The Department of Premier and Cabinet was named as the lead agency; responsible for the implementation of the new plan. Additionally, the Department of Premier and Cabinet became responsible to a number of Ministers. In addition to the Premier, the Ministers for the Central Coast, the Hunter, the Illawarra, Infrastructure, Local Government, Police, Public Sector Reform, Regulatory Reform, Women, and the Assisting the Premier on Veterans’ Affairs, and the Special Minister of State all were responsible for various functions administered by the Department of Premier and Cabinet. Following the December 2009 appointment of Kristina Keneally as Premier, Keneally announced that the restructure plan would continue to be implemented, whilst at the same time replacing Lees with Brendan O'Reilly.

Following the NSW coalition's victory at the 2011 state election, Liberal Premier Barry O'Farrell replaced O'Reilly with Chris Eccles on 4 April 2011. By August 2011, a revised agency structure was formalised, together with an overlying management structure that led to the creation of offices and divisions covering local government, planning and infrastructure including strategic lands, environment and heritage including environment and climate change, national parks and wildlife, western Sydney, parliamentary counsel, and general counsel. A further restructure took place following the 2015 state election when Premier Mike Baird transferred the functions of investment attraction, trade and tourism, and major events from the Trade and Industry to Premier and Cabinet. Minor changes to the portfolio were made following the 2019 state election when the number of clusters were reduced from ten to eight.

In April 2023, new Labor Premier Chris Minns announced that the Department of Premier and Cabinet would be split back into the Premier's Department and The Cabinet Office on 1 July 2023.

=== Agency executives ===
==== Premier's Department ====
Order	Officeholder	Position title	Start date	End date	Term in office	Ref
Premier's Department
1	James Leslie Williams	Under Secretary	2 October 1907	22 October 1910	3 years, 20 days	
2	John William Holliman	Under Secretary	22 October 1910	1 December 1911	1 year, 40 days	
3	Frederick Albert Coghlan	Under Secretary	1 December 1911	1 March 1914	2 years, 90 days	
4	Edward Burns Harkness CMG	Secretary	1 March 1914	19 May 1916	2 years, 79 days	
5	Clifford Henderson Hay CMG, CBE, MVO	Secretary	19 May 1916	1 July 1924	23 years, 323 days	
5	Clifford Henderson Hay CMG, CBE, MVO	Under Secretary	1 July 1924	6 April 1940	23 years, 323 days	
6	Joshua William Ferguson ISO, MBE	Under Secretary	7 April 1940	31 December 1947	7 years, 268 days	
7	Philip Hampden Roper CVO	Under Secretary	2 January 1948	6 October 1956	8 years, 278 days	
8	Sir George Gray CVO, CBE	Under Secretary	8 October 1956	25 August 1973	16 years, 321 days	
9	Bruce Richard Davies	Under Secretary	27 August 1973	17 January 1977	3 years, 143 days	
10	Gerald Gleeson AC	Under Secretary	17 January 1977	14 August 1978	11 years, 145 days	
10	Gerald Gleeson AC	Secretary	14 August 1978	10 June 1988	11 years, 145 days	
Premier's Office
11	Richard Humphry	Director	1 August 1988	14 September 1988	5 years, 225 days	
11	Richard Humphry	Director-General	14 September 1988	7 December 1988	5 years, 225 days	
Premier's Department					5 years, 225 days	
–	Richard Humphry AO	Director-General	7 December 1988	14 March 1994	5 years, 225 days	
12	Dr Col Gellatly	Director-General	18 May 1994	1 May 1995	348 days	
13	Ken Baxter AM	Director-General	1 May 1995	4 April 1996	339 days	
–	Roger Wilkins (acting)	Director-General	10 April 1996	29 September 1996	172 days	
–	Dr Col Gellatly AO	Director-General	30 September 1996	7 May 2007	10 years, 219 days	
14	Simon Draper	Secretary	1 September 2023	incumbent	3 years, 80 days	

==== Premier & Cabinet ====
Order	Officeholder	Position title	Start date	End date	Term in office	Ref
1	Robyn Kruk AO	Director General	7 May 2007	27 October 2008	1 year, 173 days	
2	John Lee	Director General	27 October 2008	31 December 2009	1 year, 65 days	
3	Brendan O'Reilly	Director General	1 January 2010	4 April 2011	1 year, 93 days	
4	Chris Eccles	Director General	4 April 2011	24 February 2014	3 years, 83 days	
4	Chris Eccles	Secretary	24 February 2014	26 June 2014	3 years, 83 days	
–	Simon Smith (acting)	Secretary	26 June 2014	7 October 2014	103 days	
5	Blair Comley PSM	Secretary	7 October 2014	18 November 2017	3 years, 42 days	
6	Tim Reardon	Secretary	18 November 2017	31 October 2021	3 years, 347 days	
7	Michael Coutts-Trotter	Secretary	31 October 2021	14 April 2023	1 year, 165 days	
(acting)	Peter Duncan AM	Secretary	15 April 2023	1 September 2023	139 days	

== Agency inquiries ==
In 2007, the Director General of the Department referred a matter to NSW Police following allegation that Paul Gibson had allegedly assaulted Sandra Nori, a parliamentary colleague of Gibson's with whom he had a relationship. In 2010, the Department coordinated investigations into claims that Ian Macdonald, a disgraced former Minister, had rorted his travel allowances. During 2010, the Auditor General of New South Wales accused the agency of establishing special deals with contracted public servants which resulted in them receiving a form of golden handshake. Premier Keneally defended the Department and stated that, "nobody in my government has those sorts of arrangements".

== See also ==
- New South Wales Government
- Premier of New South Wales
