= Department of Industry (New South Wales) =

NSW Department of Industry
Department overview
- Formed: 1 July 2015
- Preceding Department: Department of Trade and Investment, Regional Infrastructure and Services
- Dissolved: 1 July 2019
- Superseding Department: Department of Planning, Industry and Environment
- Jurisdiction: New South Wales
- Ministers responsible: Hon. John Barilaro MP, Deputy Premier, Minister for Skills and Minister for Small Business; Hon. Niall Blair MLC, Minister for Primary Industries, Minister for Regional Water and Minister for Trade and Industry; Hon. Paul Toole MP, Minister for Lands and Forestry and Minister for Racing; Hon. Stuart Ayres MP, Minister for Sport; Hon. Adam Marshall MP, Minister for Tourism and Major Events and Assistant minister for Skills
- Department executive: Simon Draper, Secretary
- Website: www.industry.nsw.gov.au

The New South Wales Department of Industry was a former department of the New South Wales Government, from 2015 until 2019. The Department of Industry was replaced by the Department of Planning, Industry and Environment in July 2019.

== History ==
The Department of Industry, known as Department of Industry, Skills and Regional Development between 2015 and 2017, was formed on 1 July 2015 following the 2015 state election. The predecessor industry departments of Department of Industry were:

- Department of Industry and Investment (2009–2011), branded as Industry & Investment NSW
- Department of Trade and Investment, Regional Infrastructure and Services (2011–2015), branded as NSW Trade & Investment
- Department of Industry, Skills and Regional Development (2015–2017)

Following the 2019 state election the department was abolished and most of its functions were merged with the Department of Planning and Environment to form the Department of Planning, Industry and Environment, with effect from 1 July 2019. Both the Department of Industry and the Department of Planning and Environment were abolished on the same day.

== Structure ==
Up until its 2019 abolition, the department was the lead agency in the Industry cluster, led by the secretary, at the time, Simon Draper.

=== Ministers ===
The department was responsible to the cluster's five portfolio ministers: at the time of its abolition, the Minister for Skills, and Minister for Small Business, the Hon John Barilaro MP who also served as the deputy premier; the Minister for Primary Industries, Minister for Regional Water, and Minister for Trade and Industry, the Hon Niall Blair MLC who also served as the coordinating minister of the industry cluster; the Minister for Lands and Forestry, and Minister for Racing, the Hon Paul Toole MP; the Minister for Sport, the Hon Stuart Ayres MP; the Minister for Tourism and Major Events, and Assistant Minister for Skills, the Hon Adam Marshall MP. All ministers were ultimately responsible to the Parliament of New South Wales.

=== Operational divisions ===
The department had four operational areas delivering to the citizens of NSW and a single central division—Corporate Service Partners—providing departmental services and coordination across operational and strategic functions.

The four operational divisions were:

- Skills and Economic Development
- NSW Department of Primary Industries
- Liquor, Gaming and Racing
- Lands and Water.

Also, the NSW chief scientist and engineer, the NSW small business commissioner, the land & water commissioner, and the chief audit executive reported directly to the secretary.

== Priorities ==
The department's corporate plan 2015–19 set out its direction and focus. It articulated the department's vision, purpose and values, and was driven by seven strategic priorities:

- sustaining the conditions for economic development
- innovation in primary industries to improve resilience and boost productivity
- support to increase jobs and investment in NSW
- skills development programs for employment
- sustainable use and access to natural resources
- risks managed for natural resources, farming and food
- foster a vibrant and valued sport and active recreation sector.

The department's corporate plan underpinned the delivery of the NSW State Priorities.

== Agencies ==
The Department of Industry was the lead agency in the NSW Industry Cluster, which, up until its 2019 abolition, included the following agencies, state-owned corporations and statutory bodies:

- Executive agencies: Local Land Services, Destination NSW, Office of Sport, and the NSW Institute of Sport
- State-owned corporations: Forestry Corporation of NSW, and WaterNSW.
- Cemeteries & Crematoria NSW
- Combat Sports Authority of NSW
- Dams Safety Committee
- Dumaresq–Barwon Border Rivers Commission
- Fisheries Scientific Committee
- Greyhound Racing NSW
- Greyhound Welfare & Integrity Commission
- Harness Racing NSW
- Independent Liquor & Gaming Authority
- Innovation and Productivity Council
- Marine Estate Management Authority
- NSW Rural Assistance Authority
- NSW Skills Board
- Racing NSW
- Regional Sporting Venues Authority
- Rice Marketing Board
- Snowy Scientific Committee
- State Sporting Venues Authority
- Sydney Cricket Ground and Sports Trust
- Sydney Olympic Park Authority
- TAFE Commission
- Venues NSW
- Veterinary Practitioners Board
- Wild Dog Destruction Board
- Wine Grapes Marketing Board
