= Service NSW =

Government agency in New South Wales, Australia

Agency overview
- Formed: 18 March 2013; 13 years ago
- Jurisdiction: NSW Government
- Headquarters: Sydney, Australia
- Minister responsible: Jihad Dib, Minister for Customer Service
- Agency executive: Greg Wells, CEO
- Parent department: Department of Customer Service
- Key document: Service NSW (One-stop Access to Government Services) Act 2013
- Website: service.nsw.gov.au

Service NSW is an executive agency of the New South Wales Government under the Department of Customer Service that provides one-stop access to government services via the internet, phone, or in-person at its service centres. The agency is the contact point for a number of New South Wales government agencies including Transport for NSW, Fair Trading NSW and Births, Deaths and Marriages, and provides services such as the application and renewal of licences and permits, registration of births and marriages, and payment of outstanding fines and penalties.

As of January 2026, there are 158 Service NSW centres across the state.

== History ==
Development of Service NSW commenced in July 2012, with the appointment of Michael Pratt as Customer Service Commissioner. Over the next year, organisational structure and business processes were developed, and executive team and staff were recruited. The organisation was officially created as a separate agency on 18 March 2013 within the Department of Premier and Cabinet cluster, but it was non-operating until assets, staff and liabilities were transferred from the DPC on 14 June 2013. In April 2013, a "concept store" was opened for testing.

In July 2013, its website and a round-the-clock telephone service were launched, and its inaugural Kiama service centre opened on 5 July 2013. Service NSW offices replaced Roads & Maritime Services offices in New South Wales. They provide additional services in multiple locations that were previously only available in the Sydney central business district and at certain regional locations.

On 1 July 2014, Service NSW was transferred to the Treasury and Finance cluster. The Treasury and Finance cluster was replaced by the Finance, Services and Innovation cluster on 1 July 2015, which was replaced by the customer service cluster on 1 July 2019.

== Digital innovation and recognition ==
Service NSW has been widely recognised for its role in advancing digital government service delivery in New South Wales. From the mid-2010s, the agency pursued a customer-centric, digital-first model that consolidated hundreds of government transactions into a single online and physical service network, contributing to increased accessibility and customer satisfaction.

Major digital initiatives included the expansion of end-to-end online services, mobile-first design, and the rollout of secure digital identity and credential products, including mobile licences. These initiatives achieved high levels of voluntary digital adoption while maintaining strong privacy, security, and fraud-prevention controls.

Service NSW’s digital programs received national and international recognition, including nominations and awards from organisations such as the Australian Information Industry Association (iAwards), the Digital Government Awards (Australia), and the Australian Financial Review Government Services and Innovation Awards.

== Chief executive officers ==
Service NSW is led by its chief executive officer, presently Greg Wells, who reports to the Minister for Customer Service.

- Glenn King (2012–2015)
- Rachna Gandhi (2015–2017)
- Damon Rees (2017–2022)
- Greg Wells (2022–present)

== Chief Digital Officers ==
Service NSW’s digital platforms and transformation programs have been overseen by senior digital executives holding the title of Chief Digital Officer (or equivalent executive digital leadership roles). These leaders were responsible for the design, delivery, and scaling of the agency’s core digital services and platforms.

- Chris Fechner (2019–2020)
- Katie McDermott (2020–2022)
- Christina Igasto (2022–present)
