= Department of Customer Service =

New South Wales state government agency

Department overview
- Formed: 1 July 2019
- Preceding department: Department of Finance, Services and Innovation
- Type: Ministerial department
- Jurisdiction: New South Wales, Australia
- Headquarters: Sydney
- Employees: ▼5,289
- Annual budget: ▲ A$1.116 billion (2019-20)
- Ministers responsible: The Hon. Jihad Dib MP, Minister for Customer Service and Digital Government; The Hon. John Graham MLC, Minister for the Arts; The Hon. Sophie Cotsis MP, Minister for Work Health and Safety; The Hon. Courtney Houssos MLC, Minister for Finance Minister for Domestic Manufacturing and Government Procurement
- Department executives: Graeme Head, Secretary; David Chandler OAM, Building Commissioner
- Child agencies: Service NSW; Revenue NSW; State Insurance Regulatory Authority
- Website: nsw.gov.au/customer-service

The Department of Customer Service is a department of the New South Wales Government that functions as a service provider to support sustainable government finances, major public works and maintenance programs, government procurement, information and communications technology, corporate and shared services, consumer protection, and land and property administration of the government in New South Wales, Australia.

The department was established with effect from 1 July 2019 and assumed most functions from the preceding Department of Finance, Service and Innovation, as well as a number of functions from other departments and several agencies.

== Structure ==
The Department is the lead agency in the Customer Service cluster, led by Secretary Graeme Head, who reports to the ministers listed below.

=== Ministers ===
The following ministers are responsible for the administration of the department and its agencies:

- Minister for Customer Service and Digital Government
- Minister for the Arts
- Minister for Work Health and Safety
- Minister for Finance
- Minister for Domestic Manufacturing and Government Procurement
- Minister for Small Business
- Minister for Better Regulation and Fair Trading
- Minister for Building

Ultimately, the ministers are responsible to the Parliament of New South Wales.

=== Agencies ===
The following agencies are included in the Customer Service cluster, administered by the Department:

- NSW Architects Registration Board (self-funded regulatory body)
- Behavioural Insights Unit
- Board of Surveying and Spatial Information
- Budget Data Visualisation
- Building Commission NSW
- Customer Experience Unit
- Cyber Security NSW
- Digital NSW
- Geographical Names Board of New South Wales
- ID Support NSW
- Independent Pricing and Regulatory Tribunal Staff Agency
- Independent Review Office
- Information and Privacy Commission NSW
- Long Service Corporation
- NSW Digital Channels
- NSW Fair Trading
- NSW Registry of Births, Deaths & Marriages
- NSW Small Business Commission
- NSW Telco Authority
- Office of the Registrar General (to monitor and enforce performance of the NSW Land Registry Services)
- Personal Injury Commission
- Professional Standards Authority
- Revenue NSW
- SafeWork NSW
- Service NSW
- Spatial Services
- State Insurance Regulatory Authority (SIRA)
- Subsidence Advisory NSW
- Surveyor General of NSW
- TestSafe

== Structure ==
The department was established with effect from 1 July 2019 and assumed most of the functions of the former Department of Finance, Services and Innovation that was dissolved on the same date, as well as some functions from the New South Wales Treasury and the Department of Premier and Cabinet. The department also incorporated Liquor & Gaming NSW, the Data Analytics Centre, and the NSW Registry of Births, Deaths and Marriages.

=== NSW Fair Trading ===
NSW Fair Trading is a division of the New South Wales State Government's Department of Customer Service in Australia.

The division's focus is to create a fair, safe and equitable marketplace in New South Wales. It investigates allegations of unfair business practices, and regulates goods sold in New South Wales. It also performs the administrative functions of registering business cooperatives and associations, and issuing occupational licenses.

Fair Trading's customer service is managed by Service NSW, which acts as first point of contact for all Fair Trading enquiries.

== See also ==
- List of New South Wales government agencies
