= New South Wales Land and Property Information =

Australian state government agency

Agency overview
- Formed: 1 April 2011
- Preceding Agency: Land and Property Management Authority
- Dissolved: 1 December 2017
- Superseding Agency: NSW Land Registry Services; Office of the Registrar General
- Jurisdiction: New South Wales
- Headquarters: Registrar-General's building, 1 Prince Albert Road, Sydney
- Minister responsible: The Hon. Victor Dominello MP, Minister for Finance, Services and Property
- Agency executive: Des Mooney, General manager
- Parent Department: Department of Finance, Services and Innovation
- Child agencies: Board of Surveying and Spatial Information; Geographical Names Board; Valuer General of New South Wales
- Website: Land & Property Information

The New South Wales Land and Property Information (NSW LPI), a division of the Department of Finance, Services and Innovation in the government of New South Wales, was the division responsible for land titles, property information, valuation, surveying, and mapping and spatial information in the Australian state of New South Wales. From 1 July 2017, the operation was transferred to Australian Registry Investments, a private consortium, under a 35-year concession with the NSW government. The LPI was subsequently renamed and replaced by the NSW Land Registry Services on 1 December 2017.

The NSW government continues to guarantee title under the Torrens Assurance Fund (TAF) and will continue to retain full ownership of all land title data. The government created the Office of the Registrar General on 1 July 2016 to monitor and enforce the operator’s performance of the land titles registry business in respect of defined service levels, KPIs and the security of the data. The Office of the Registrar General is also a division of the Department of Finance, Services and Innovation, the minister of which is the Minister for Finance, Services and Property, currently Victor Dominello MP.

The division was led by its general manager, currently Des Mooney, who reports to the secretary of the Department of Finance, Services, and Innovation. Both the general manager for Land and Property Information and the secretary of the Department reported to the Minister for Finance, Services and Property.

== Activities ==
Land and Property Information achieves its aims by maintaining a secure, efficient and guaranteed system of land ownership and registry; collection, collation, and integration of property information to assist with land management, conveyancing, property development, investment, local planning, state economic and social development and historical research; maintaining impartial and transparent valuation services to assist local and state government to determine rates and land taxes; implementation and monitoring standards for the survey industry to provide certainty and confidence when establishing property locations, boundaries and the construction of public infrastructure; and converts the wealth of land data it collects into a comprehensive and authoritative range of online and hard copy mapping products and services.

The division was also responsible for the Geographical Names Board of New South Wales and the New South Wales Board of Surveying and Spatial Information.

== History ==
Previously known as the Land and Property Management Authority, the organisation had broader responsibilities including the above activities plus the management of certain government-owned land, the maintenance of recreational and visitor facilities, such as State Parks, Great North Walk and The Hume and Hovell Walking Track. However, on 1 April 2011, the Authority was abolished and some of its functions merged into the Department of Finance and Services, with operational divisions created including Land and Property Information, and the State Property Authority. The Authority's previous functions within the Office of Rural Affairs, Crown Lands, and the Soil Conservation Service were transferred to the Department of Trade and Investment, Regional Infrastructure and Services and Department of Primary Industries.

The Australian Registry Investments, a consortium between the Hastings Funds Management Limited and the First State Super, won the rights to operate the titling and registry operations of New South Wales in April 2017, under a 35-year concession. It took over the New South Wales Land and Property Information in July 2017, which was renamed to NSW Land Registry Services in December 2017.
