= Queens Square, Sydney =

Public square in Sydney, Australia

Queens Square
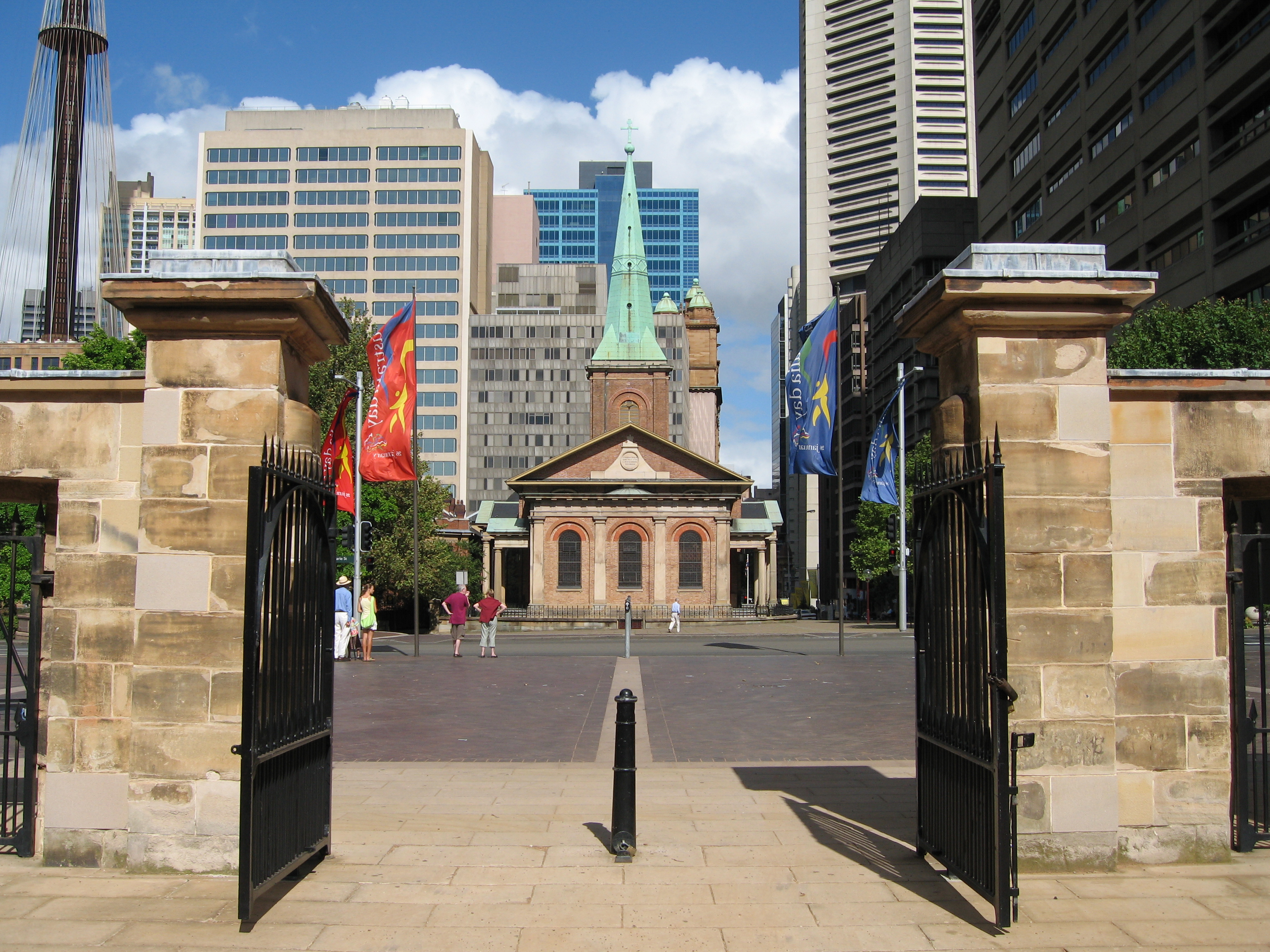
- View across Queens Square from inside the gates of Hyde Park Barracks towards St James' Church. The Supreme Court building is to the right, and the statues of Queen Victoria and Prince Albert and Hyde Park, are to the left.

- Location within Sydney
- Former name: King Street
- Namesake: Queen Victoria
- Type: Public square
- Addresses: Junction of King, Phillip and Macquarie streets and bounded on the south by St James and Prince Albert roads.
- Location: Sydney central business district, New South Wales
- Nearest metro station: St James
- Coordinates: 33°52′10″S 151°12′43″E

Construction
- Completion: c. 1977

Queens Square is a public square in central Sydney, Australia. The square is located at the junction of King Street with Phillip and Macquarie streets. It is bounded on the south by St James Road and Prince Albert Road.

== Description ==
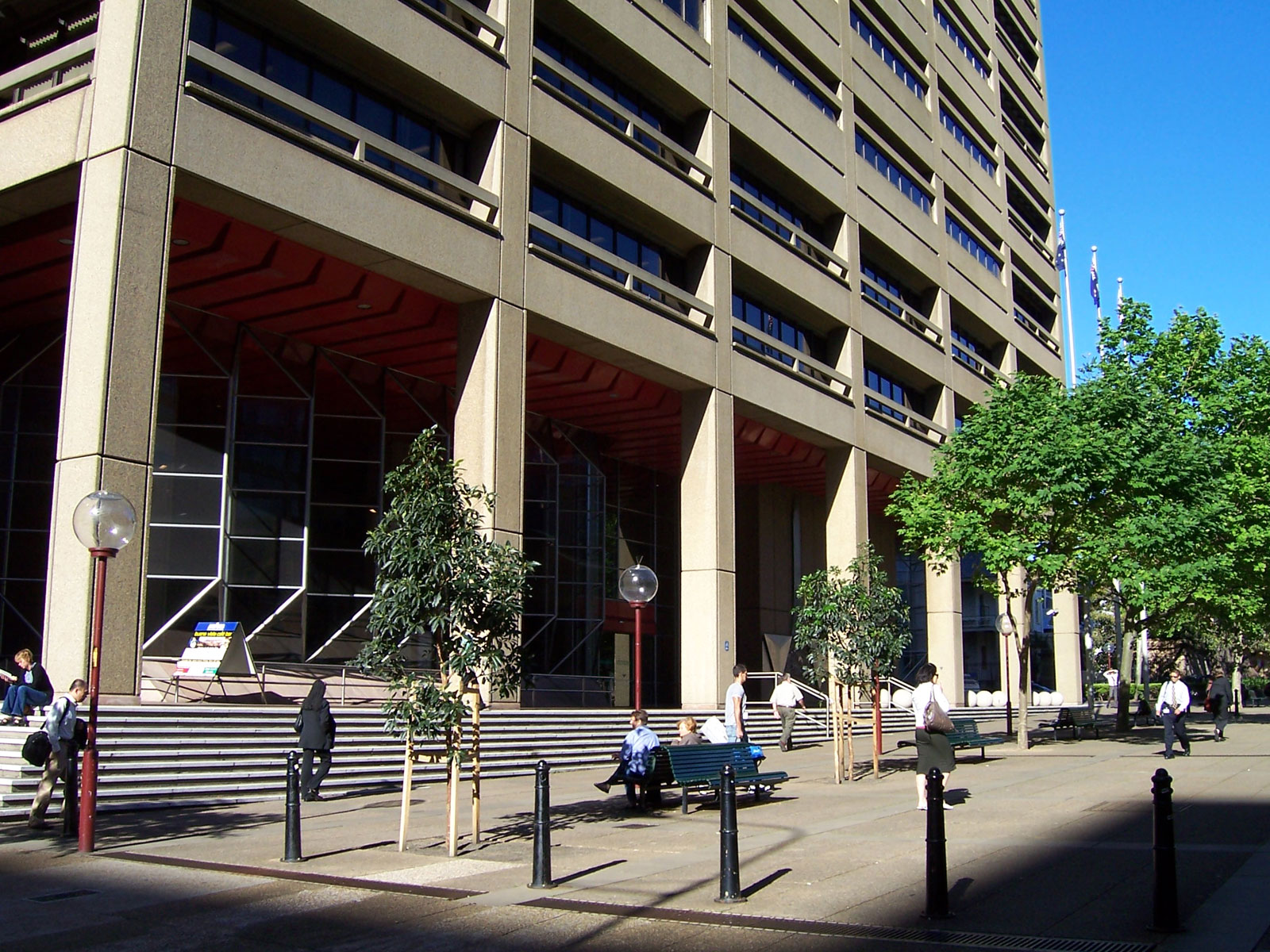
Law Courts Building. The open space on the right is the northern end of Queen's Square.

Arranged around Queens Square, clockwise from the north, are the Law Courts Building, the Sydney Mint, the UNESCO World Heritage Listed Hyde Park Barracks, the Land Titles Office, Hyde Park, St James' Church, and Sydney Law School. These buildings, other than the Law Courts Building and Sydney Law School, are all heritage-listed constructions, mostly dating from the 18th and 19th centuries.

Named in honour of Queen Victoria, a statue erected in her honour stands on the south-western corner of the square, and faces northward towards the Law Courts building. Another statue, of Prince Albert, stands on the south-eastern corner, and faces across Macquarie Street towards the statue of the Queen. Another memorial located on the square is that to Francis Greenway, NSW Colonial Architect responsible for some of the surrounding buildings, which is a mosaic and relief set into the ground in front of the Law Courts Building.

Being a public square adjacent to the Supreme Court of New South Wales, and also close to Parliament House, the square is often the scene of political and individual protests.

St James station is located underground to the south of the square, accessible by a pedestrian underpass below St James Road.

== History ==
Governor Lachlan Macquarie planned a public square on the location in the early nineteenth century. The square was originally named Kings Square, but was renamed Queens Square when Queen Victoria came to the throne in 1837. The statue of Queen Victoria was unveiled by Lady Carrington, the wife of the Governor of New South Wales in 1888, for Australia's centenary. It was in the middle of a circle of roads, which soon became a loop of tramways. In the late 1970s when the Law Courts Building was constructed, King Street was terminated at its junction with Phillip Street, and the former thoroughfare between Phillip Street and Macquarie Street became part of the square.

== See also ==
- List of places named after Queen Victoria in Australia
- Architecture of Sydney
