= Registrar General's Building =

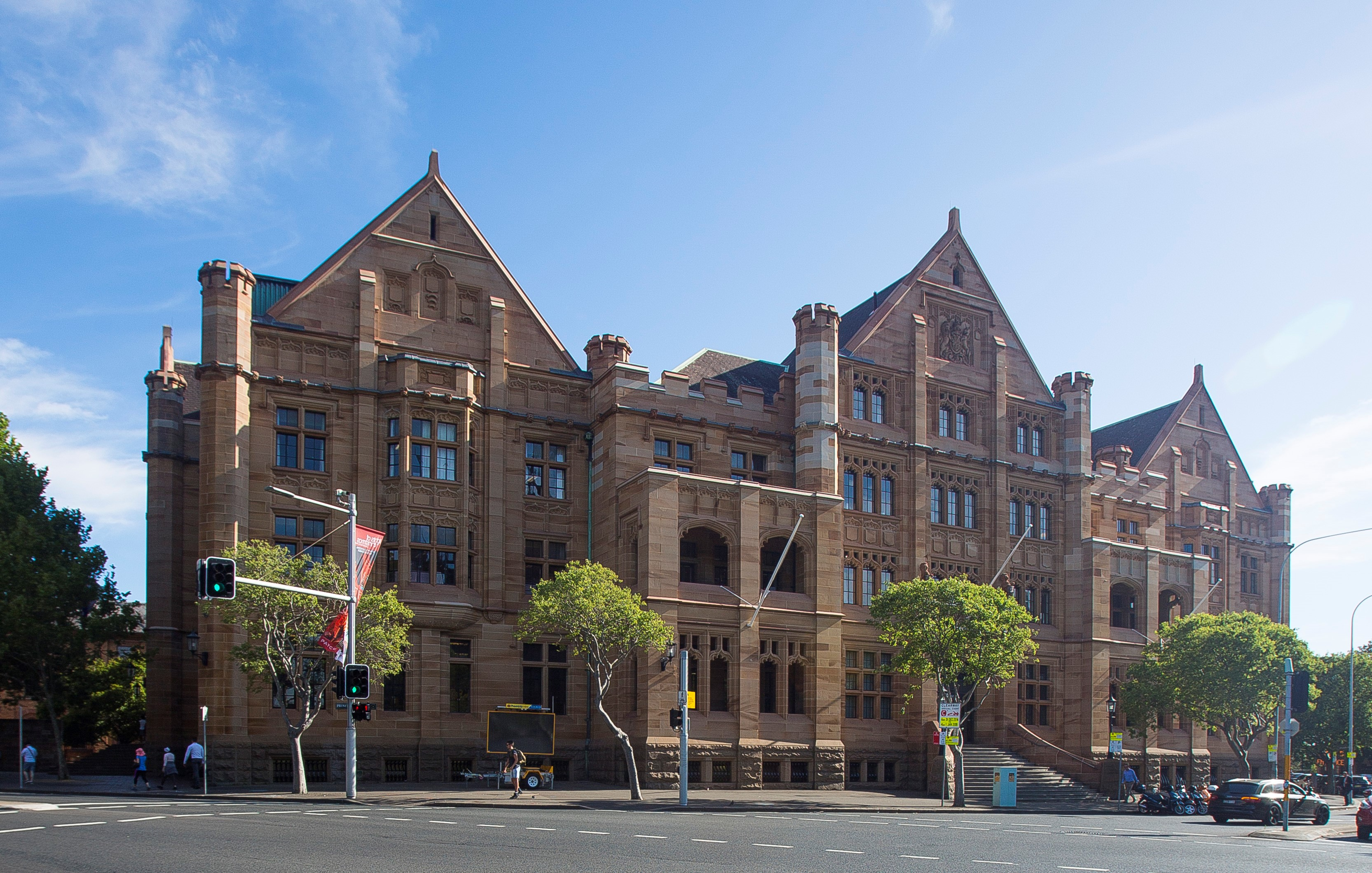
- The main facade from Prince Albert Road

- Location within Sydney
- Alternative names: Land Titles Office
- Etymology: Registrar-General Department

General information
- Status: Completed
- Type: Government administration
- Architectural style: Federation Gothic
- Location: 1 Prince Albert Road, Sydney central business district, New South Wales, Australia
- Coordinates: 33°52′12″S 151°12′48″E
- Current tenants: Land and Property Information
- Construction started: 1909
- Completed: 1913
- Client: Registrar-General's Department
- Owner: Government of New South Wales

Technical details
- Material: Sandstone-faced; Steel-framed construction; Reinforced concrete floor; Slate covered steel framed roof
- Floor count: 3

Design and construction
- Architects: Walter Liberty Vernon; E. H. Farmer (alterations in 1963)
- Architecture firm: New South Wales Government Architect

New South Wales Heritage Register
- Official name: Land Titles Office; Registrar General's Department Building
- Type: State heritage (built)
- Designated: 2 April 1999
- Reference no.: 962
- Type: Administration Office
- Category: Government and Administration
- Builders: Loveridge & Hudson

The Registrar General's Building, which hosts today's Land Titles Office of the Australian state of New South Wales, is a heritage-listed building located in the Sydney central business district. The building is currently used by the Land and Property Information division of the Department of Finance, Services and Innovation, part of the Government of New South Wales. It was added to the New South Wales State Heritage Register on 2 April 1999.

The building is located near the junction of College and Macquarie street and is set in an historical setting on the eastern fringe of the central business district alongside St Mary's Cathedral, Queen's Square, St James' Church, the Sydney Mint, the UNESCO World Heritage Listed Hyde Park Barracks, and Hyde Park.

== History ==
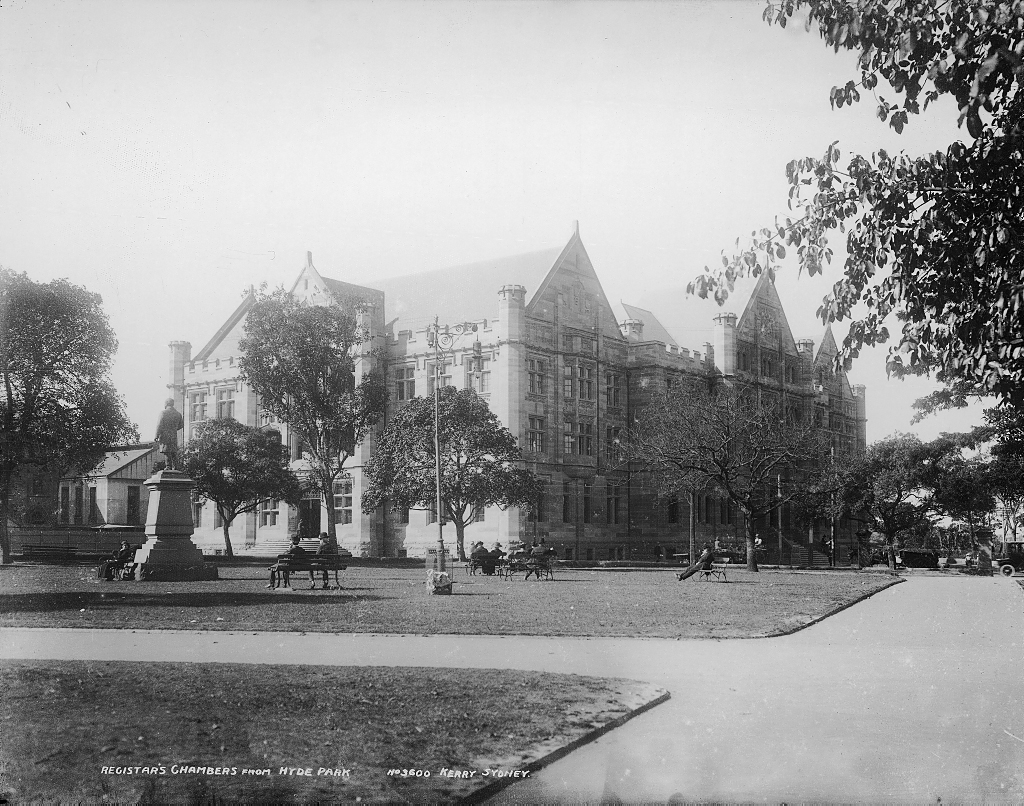
Registrar's Chambers (c. 1900)

The major part of the building is designed by Government Architect Walter Liberty Vernon and completed c. 1913. The building contractors and stonework contractors were Loveridge and Hudson. Designed by Vernon in 1908, the building was constructed in stages from 1909 to 1913 to house the Registrar-General's Department, replacing the 1860 Registrar General's Office in Elizabeth Street. The building was used as the central recording point of births, deaths and marriages in the state and the storage of title deeds for the vast majority of the twentieth century.

== Description ==
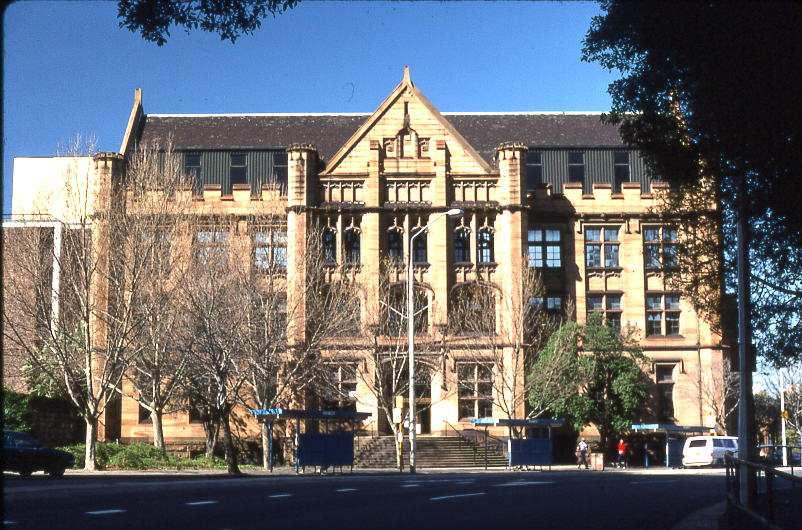
The western facade, pictured in 2007

A three-storey Neo-Gothic sandstone-faced office building with attic storey and basement, of steel-framed construction with reinforced concrete floor and slate covered steel framed roof. The facades contain some elaborate gothic detailing to windows and good carving work to gables and over entrances. The three large gables facing Prince Albert Road are flanked by castellated corner turrets, whilst the facade to Queen's Square has a similar small gable flanked by two turrets on each side. The initials CH (Colin Hudson, stonemason), are carved into one of the string course bosses at about second-floor level on the western side return wall of the main entrance facing St. Mary's. Nearby on a small octagonal turret are the initials of his father HCH (Herbert Charles Hudson). On the eastern side of the main entrance on the east and west elevations, with initials of the architects and clerks of works. On the keystone of the arch over the main entrance are the entwined numbers 1912.

=== Modifications and dates ===
Originally U-shaped, the north side was closed off by an addition in 1953 and further extended in the 1960s.

== Heritage listing ==
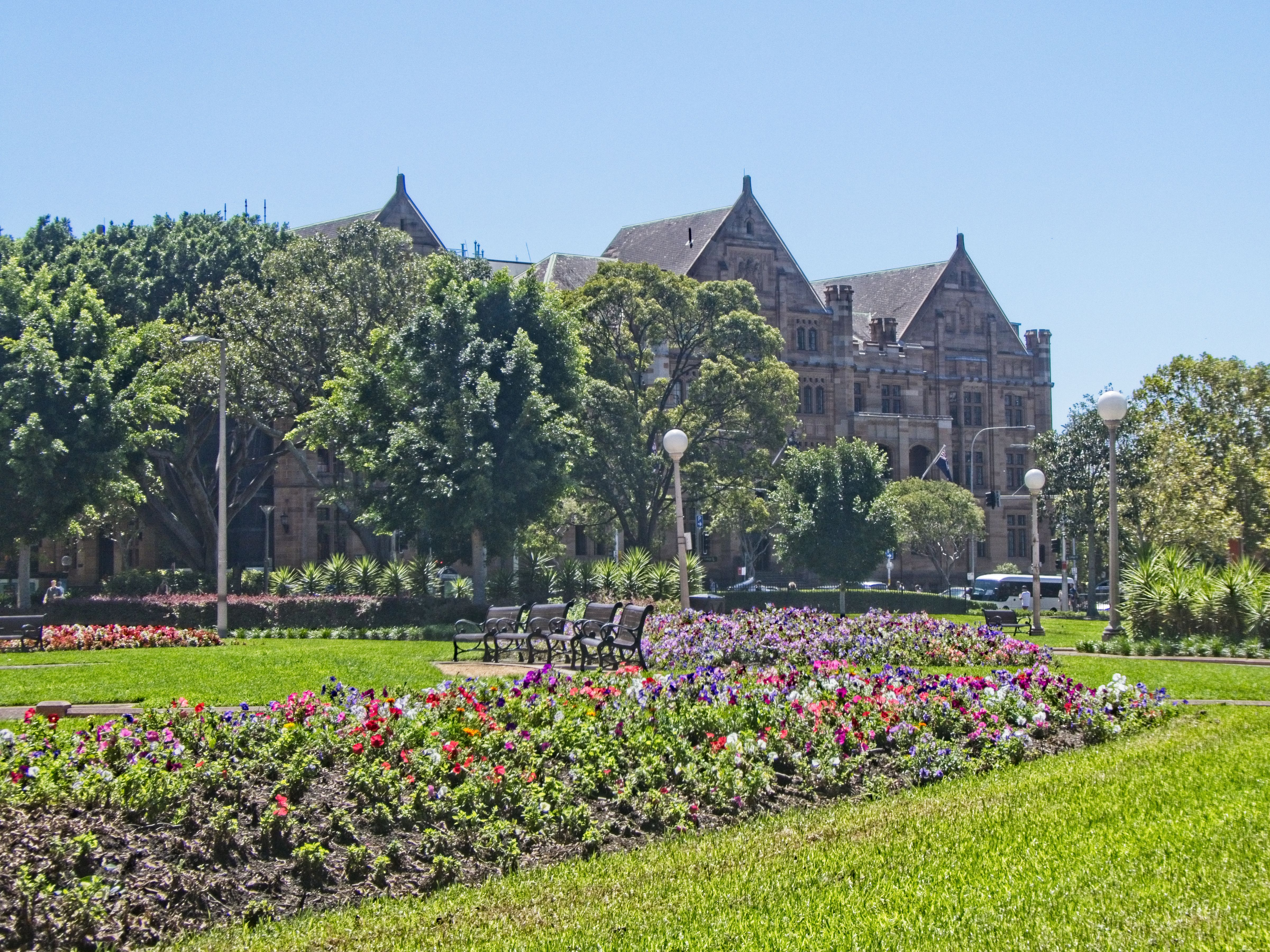
The building as viewed from Hyde Park

As at 6 December 2000, a well scaled civic building sensitively detailed to complement the adjoining older buildings such as St. Mary's Cathedral. Its carefully composed sandstone facade contributes to the streetscape and satisfactorily terminates the northern end of College Street. It provides a sympathetic component in the progression of civic historical buildings along College Street to Queen's Square. The building has long association with the registration of birth, death and marriages, as well as trade marks, bills of sale, business agents etc. The building stores valuable old registers and other land title documents.

Registrar-General's building was listed on the New South Wales State Heritage Register on 2 April 1999.

== See also ==
- Australian non-residential architectural styles
- General Register Office
