= PCPN =

PCPN may refer to:

- Permanent Committee on Place Names, a geographical naming agency
- Podkarpackie Centrum Piłki Nożnej, a football stadium in Stalowa Wola, Poland
