= Michael Coutts-Trotter =

Australian public servant

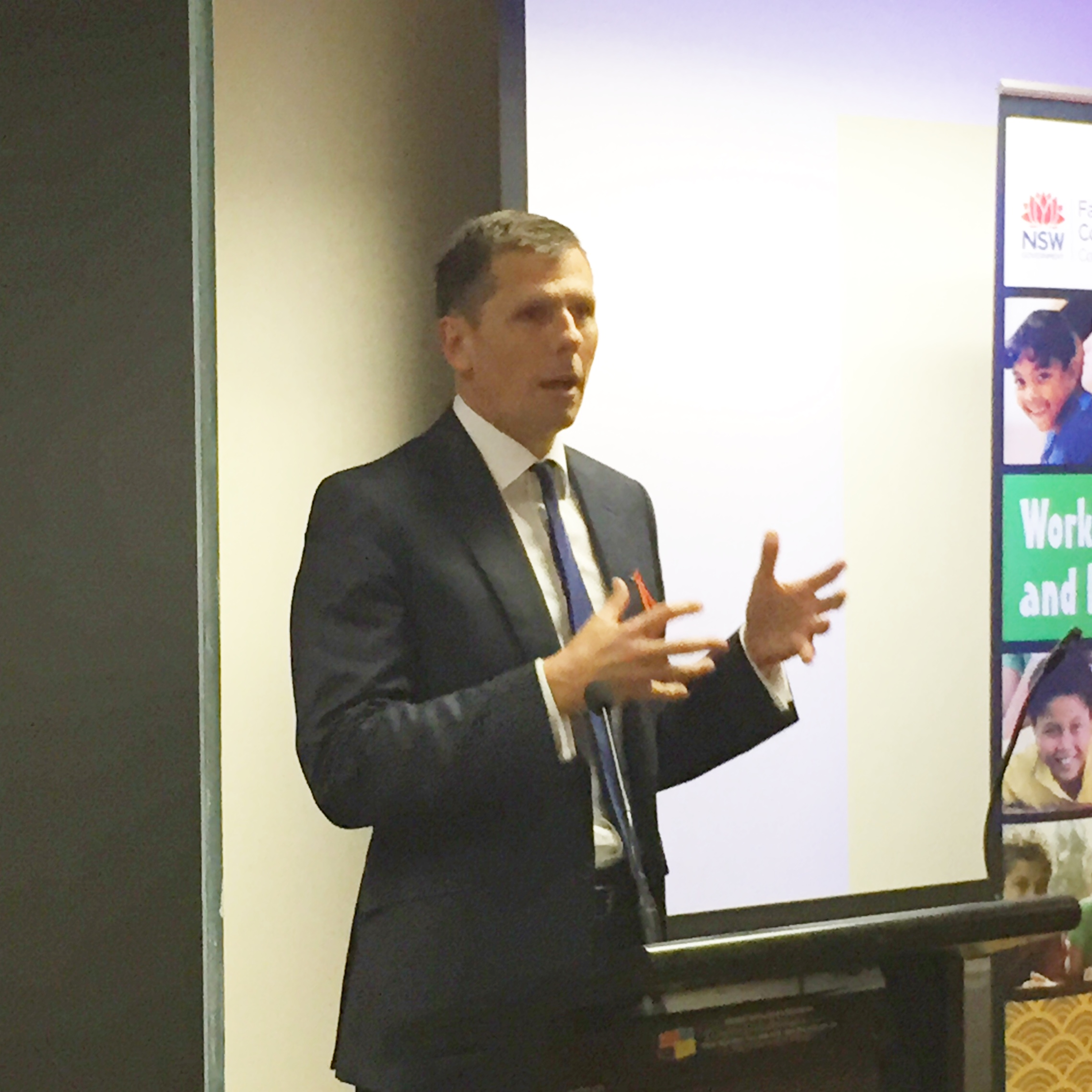
- Education: University of Technology, Sydney
- Occupation: Public servant
- Employer: New South Wales Government
- Organisation(s): New South Wales Treasury; Department of Premier and Cabinet (2021–2023); Department of Communities and Justice (until 2021)
- Spouse: Tanya Plibersek MP (married since November 2000)
- Children: Anna, Joe and Louis

Michael Coutts-Trotter is an Australian public servant who is the current Secretary of the New South Wales Treasury.

He was previously the Secretary of the New South Wales Department of Premier and Cabinet and of the Department of Communities and Justice, and director-general of the Department of Education and of the Department of Finance and Services. Coutts-Trotter served almost three years of a nine-year prison sentence after being convicted for the importation and distribution of heroin into Australia in 1986.

== Early life ==
Coutts-Trotter was born in Poole Maternity Hospital England in 1965 and arrived in Australia in 1976 with his parents who were married in 1975. His father Paul was the son of Sir Murray Coutts-Trotter, former chief Justice of Madras, while his mother Helen was from Cootamundra. Coutts-Trotter matriculated from Saint Ignatius' College, Riverview. In 1986, he received a nine-year prison sentence as a drug dealer selling heroin to addicts. He served two years and nine months in jail before parole in 1988. He graduated from the University of Technology Sydney with a degree in communications in 1995.

== Public service career ==
In April 2007, Coutts-Trotter was appointed Director-General of the NSW Department of Education. The appointment was criticised by opposition members of parliament, the NSW Teachers Federation and the Public Principals Forum, citing his lack of experience in teaching and education, and his criminal conviction as a heroin trafficker.

The Teachers Federation also questioned his criminal past and time spent in prison for heroin dealing, with the Federation's president, Maree O'Halloran, saying that a teacher with his criminal conviction for a serious drug offence would be unable to continue teaching and working with children.

Appointing him as Director-General of the Department of Finance and Services in April 2011, Premier Barry O'Farrell said that Coutts-Trotter's skills would allow the new department to deliver on its results. It was reported in July 2013, upon his appointment to lead the Department of Family and Community Services, that Coutts-Trotter's new role was a demotion. Following the report, O'Farrell held a media conference to reject the suggestion.

In 2013, Coutts-Trotter was made a national fellow of the Institute of Public Administration Australia.

In April 2019, Coutts-Trotter was announced as the new head of the (NSW) Department of Communities & Justice after Andrew Cappie-Wood left that position.

In October 2021, the newly appointed NSW Premier Dominic Perrottet announced that Coutts-Trotter would be promoted to the role of Secretary of the NSW Department of Premier and Cabinet. In April 2023, he was appointed by the new Labor government as the acting secretary of the New South Wales Treasury.

== Personal life ==
Coutts-Trotter is married to Tanya Plibersek, a federal MP and former deputy leader of the Australian Labor Party.
