= Geographical Names Board =

Geographical Names Board may refer to:

- Geographic names board, an official body established by a government to decide on official names for geographical areas and features
- Geographical Names Board of Canada
- Geographical Names Board of New South Wales
