= Norman Oakes =

Australian public servant

Norman "Norm" Oakes AO (24 February 1926 – 5 September 2015) was a former New South Wales public servant.

== Early life ==
Norman "Norm" Oakes was born on 24 February 1926 in Wallsend, New South Wales, Australia, the son of John Oakes and Florence Bobb. He attended Newcastle Boys' High School and thereafter studied economics at the University of Sydney. Joining the NSW Public Service on 21 July 1941. During the Second World War Oakes enlisted in the Royal Australian Air Force, serving from 1944 to 1946.

== Public service career ==
After the war Oakes rose to be Registrar-General of NSW Births Deaths and marriages and a member of the Public Service board. Eventually joining the NSW Treasury in 1960, he rose to become the head in 1977 as Under Secretary and Comptroller of Accounts, the last to serve under that title. In the 1986 Australia Day honours list Oakes was appointed an Officer of the Order of Australia (AO). In 1987 the Royal Australian Institute of Public Administration named him as one of their National Fellows.

== Later life ==
After his retirement in 1986 Oakes served as a Commissioner of the City of Sydney from its dismissal by the Unsworth Government on 6 April 1987 to 31 December 1988. In later years he served the NSW Branch of the Red Cross, including as Honorary Treasurer, for which he was awarded the Centenary Medal in January 2001.

In retirement, Oakes was an active member of the Yowie Bay Community and helped run a local Neighbourhood Watch program there for many years. He was also active in the local RSL (Miranda sub-branch). On 5 September 2015, Oakes died at his residence in Yowie Bay aged 90, and was buried at Woronora Cemetery.

Government offices
Preceded by William Ernest Henry	Under Secretary and Comptroller of Accounts of The Treasury; 1977 – 1986	Succeeded by Percy Allan (economist)
Civic offices
Preceded by Doug Sutherland as Lord Mayor of Sydney	Commissioner of the City of Sydney; 1987 – 1988; With: Neal (Chief), Shehadie (Deputy)	Succeeded by Jeremy Bingham as Lord Mayor of Sydney
