= Suburbs and localities (Australia) =

Geographic subdivisions in Australia

Suburbs and localities are the names of geographic subdivisions in Australia, used mainly for address purposes. The term locality is used in rural areas, while the term suburb is used in urban areas. Australian postcodes closely align with the boundaries of localities and suburbs.

This Australian usage of the term suburb differs from common American and British usage of suburb (municipality outside of a big city). The Australian usage is closer to the American or British use of neighbourhood or district, and can be used to refer to any portion of a city. Unlike the use in British or American English, this term can include inner-city, outer-metropolitan and industrial areas.

Localities existed in the past as informal units, but in 1996 the Intergovernmental Committee on Surveying and Mapping and the Committee for Geographical Names in Australasia (CGNA) decided to name and establish official boundaries for all localities and suburbs. In 2016, the process covered most of Australia but remained incomplete in rural areas of South Australia, rural Australian Capital Territory, and certain islands or water areas. Northern Territory boundaries continue to be actively maintained and updated quarterly.

The CGNA's Gazetteer of Australia recognises two types of locality: bounded and unbounded. Bounded localities include towns, villages, populated places, local government towns and unpopulated town sites, while unbounded localities include place names, road corners and bends, corners, meteorological stations, ocean place names and surfing spots.

Sometimes, both localities and suburbs are referred to collectively as "address localities".

In the first instance, decisions about the names and boundaries of suburbs and localities are made by the local council in which they are located based on criteria such as community recognition. Local council decisions are, however, subject to approval by the state's geographical names board. The boundaries of some suburbs and localities overlap two or more local government areas (LGAs). Examples of this are Adamstown Heights, which is split between the City of Newcastle and City of Lake Macquarie LGAs; and Woodville, which is split between the City of Maitland and Port Stephens Council LGAs. In unincorporated areas, localities are declared by the relevant state authority.
