= Law Courts, Sydney =

Coordinates: 33.8690°S 151.2115°E

Law Courts Building, Sydney
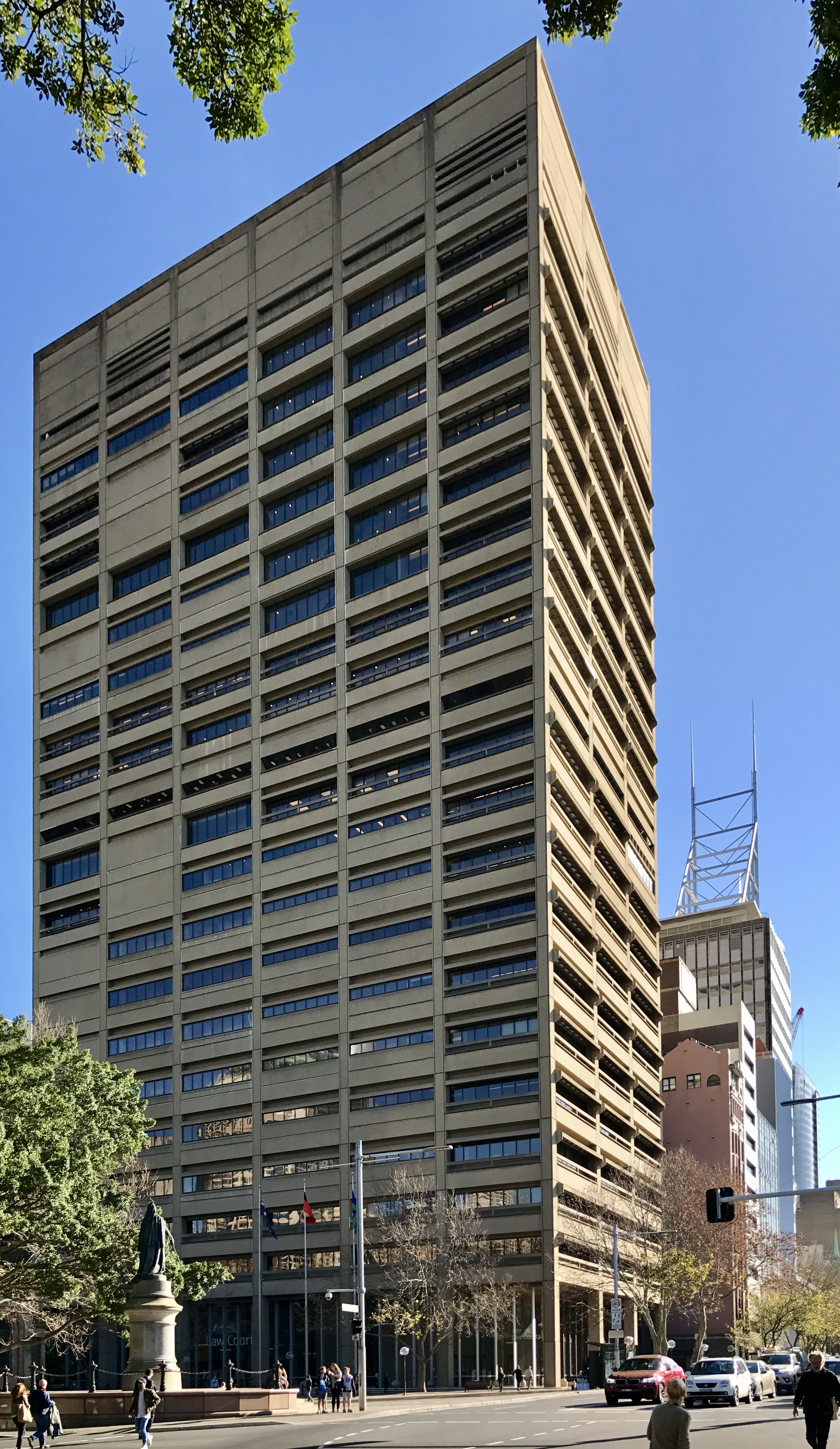
- View of the Law Courts from Queens Square
- Interactive map of the Law Courts Building, Sydney area

General information
- Type: Courts
- Architectural style: Brutalist
- Location: Queens Square, 184 Phillip Street, Sydney, Australia
- Current tenants: High Court of Australia, Federal Court of Australia, Supreme Court of NSW, Commonwealth Attorney General and Solicitor General of Australia
- Construction started: 1976
- Completed: 1977
- Opened: 1 February 1977
- Renovated: 2007—2012
- Client: Department of Attorney, Commonwealth of Australia & NSW Attorney–General

Technical details
- Floor count: 27

Design and construction
- Architect: Geoffrey Atherden AM
- Architecture firm: McConnel Smith and Johnson

Renovating team
- Architects: GroupGSA & Hassell
- Structural engineer: Taylor Thomson Whitting
- Quantity surveyor: Currie+Brown

Website
- https://supremecourt.nsw.gov.au/

The Law Courts Building is a building on Queens Square in Sydney, Australia, completed in 1977 in Twentieth Century Brutalist style. It is the seat of the Supreme Court of New South Wales, as well as parts of the Federal Court of Australia and the High Court of Australia.

== Building ==
The building is 114 metres tall, with 27 floors housing 34 state and 27 federal courtrooms, built in 1976 with the NSW Government and Commonwealth Government sharing the construction cost. It was designed by Geoffrey Atherden of the prominent architectural firm, McConnel Smith and Johnson, with an emphasis on making courts more humane and accessible in their design.

=== Coats of arms ===
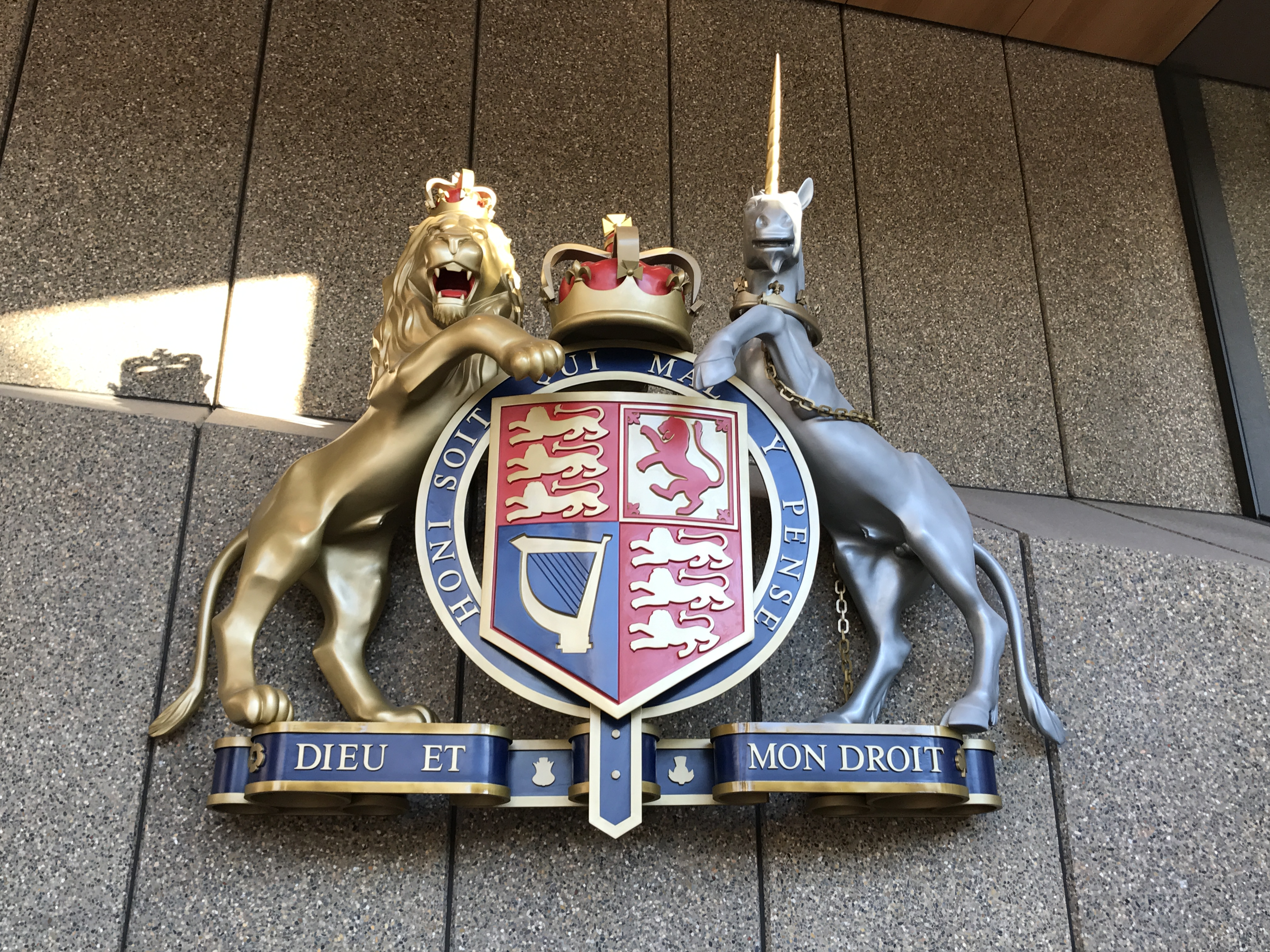
The royal arms (1975) in the lobby by Mike Kitching.

The Royal and Commonwealth coats of arms present in the lobby were designed in 1971–1975 by sculptor Michael Kitching, who also designed 64 smaller arms throughout the Judges Chambers and courtrooms in the building. Kitching's designs of the arms were noted for their singular artistic interpretation, including showing the lion and unicorn of the Royal Arms in guardant pose, and more natural poses for the kangaroo and emu in the Commonwealth Coat of Arms ("Traditionally in the Australian Arms the kangaroo sits bolt upright like a dog begging and not like any 'roo I've ever seen. And the emu has had its neck and legs stretched more like an ostrich. I've done them as they really appear. It's officially wrong, but it makes a lot more sense.").

On his works, Kitching noted: "We made simple modifications so that the work would complement a modern building without any lessening of tradition." To complete his commission, Kitching employed 15 students from the UNSW College of Fine Arts working to produce all the artworks in the studio of painter John Firth-Smith in North Sydney.

== History ==
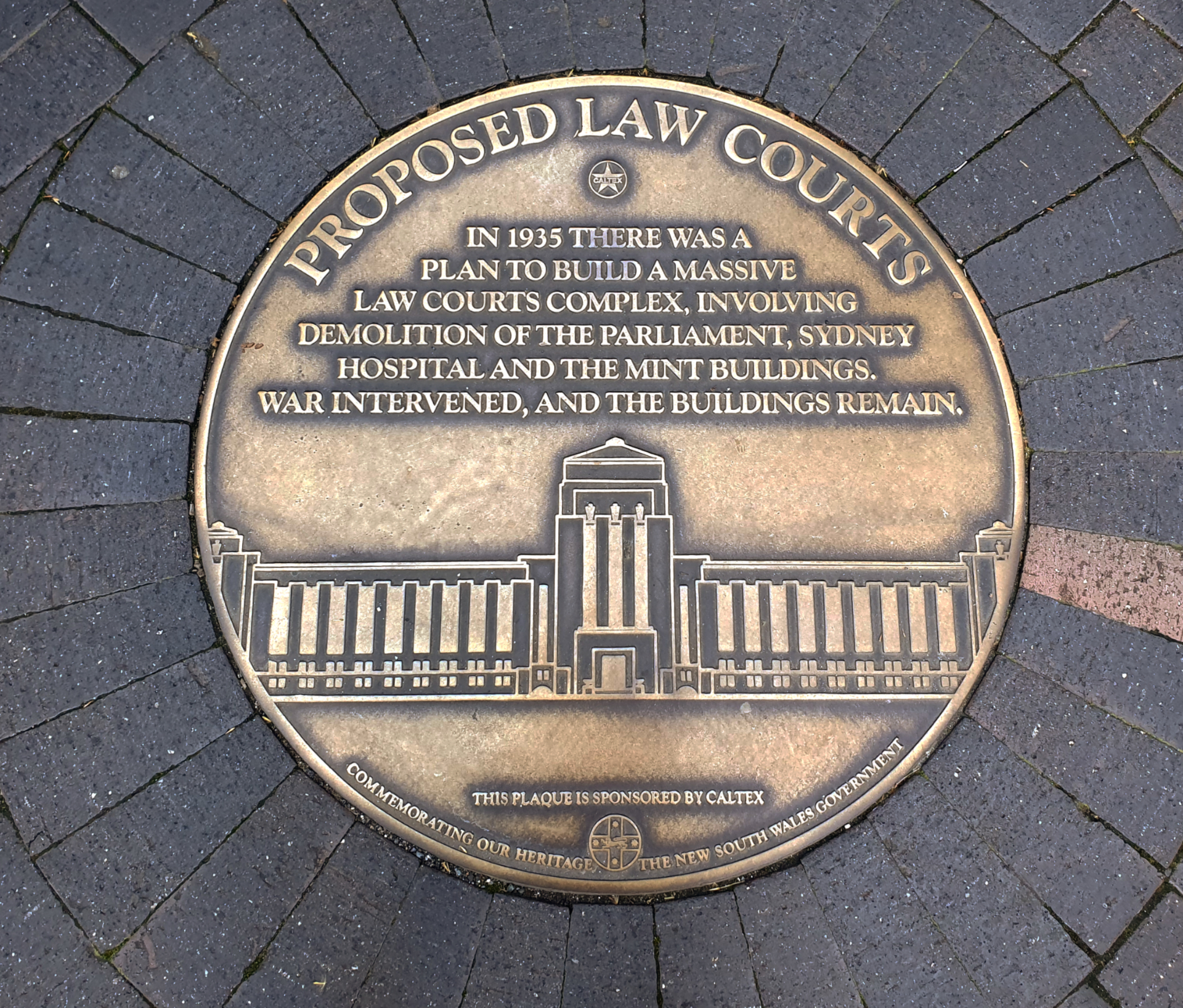
A memorial plaque to the proposed 1938 Law Courts building by Peddle Thorp and Walker, in front of Parliament House.

The first proposal for a purpose-built Law Courts Building, that would house the majority of courts, in Sydney was made in the late 1930s by the United Australia Party government of Bertram Stevens, which commenced early planning for a new Government precinct along Macquarie Street to Queen's Square, that would include a Large Law Courts building. In June 1935, the government established the "Macquarie Street Replanning Committee" with its role being "to advise the Government upon the re-planning and possible reconstruction, of certain portions of Macquarie-street and other areas in the vicinity affected by recent changes in the city; to prepare a scheme for consideration of the Government in relation to such questions as the disposal of the Mint site, the best location of the proposed new Law Courts, and the utilisation of the site upon which the present Supreme Court stands". A nine-member expert committee was appointed, including the prominent engineer and planner, Sir John Butters, as chairman. The committee's recommendations, including for a new law courts building on the site of the Parliament House, the Sydney Hospital, as well as the Sydney Mint, were accepted by the government in early 1937, and the Stevens Government requested that the committee then commence a design competition for this new structure. In August 1938, the winning design was announced by the government, being the design created by architects Samuel George Thorp, F. H. E. Walker, and Frank Thorp, of the firm Peddle Thorp and Walker. Estimated at a cost of £1,500,000, the designs were a highly ambitious scheme, with a large edifice in the Inter-war Art Deco style that was 900 feet (270 m) long, 170 feet (52 m) wide, and with three towers, the tallest being the central tower at 220 feet (67 m) crowning the top of Martin Place.

Faced with significant planning and cost hurdles including the need for government legislation, the scheme was delayed by the government and then was eclipsed by the outbreak of war in September 1939. In July 1939, the committee chairman, Sir John Butters, had expressed his frustration with the delays in planning the scheme: "the longer the commencement of improvements is delayed the greater are the prospects that the scheme for making them will be abandoned altogether". A year later in 1940, it was reported that the government was considering alterations to the Macquarie Street scheme, and by 1945, the succeeding Labor Government of William McKell, was considering a new scheme centred on Circular Quay. In June 1946, a new Macquarie Street plan was unveiled by McKell's government, with new draft designs that included a public square at the top of Martin Place, a law courts building, and a theatre/opera house complex.

The courts commenced operation from 17 January 1977 and the Law Courts Building was officially opened by the Premier of New South Wales, Neville Wran, on 1 February 1977.

== Refurbishment 2007—2012 ==
Between 2007 and 2012 the Law Courts underwent a major refurbishment of interiors, services and technology by The Reed Group. Architects Group GSA and Hassell and engineers Taylor Thomson Whitting undertook the redesign with minimal changes to the external form of the building. The works included: upgrading of the base building to modern standards, removal of asbestos from structural steel, upgrading of fire compliance to current BCA standards, upgrading of energy and water reticulation and refurbishment of interiors, fittings and finishes.
