= Morrison (investment firm) =

Investment company

- Type: Private company
- Industry: Investment management
- Founded: 8 August 1988
- Founder: Lloyd Morrison
- Headquarters: Wellington, New Zealand
- Key people: Rob Morrison (chairman); Paul Newfield (CEO)
- Subsidiaries: Infratil
- Website: morrisonglobal.com

H.R.L. Morrison & Co Group Limited Partnership, trading as Morrison, and formerly as Morrison & Co, is a New Zealand-founded global infrastructure investment manager, investing in both private and listed markets. It is headquartered in Wellington, New Zealand, and has offices in several other countries around the world.

== History ==
Morrison & Co was founded in 1988 by Lloyd Morrison to offer a broad range of investment advisory services to private and public sectors in New Zealand and Australia. In the early 1990s Morrison narrowed its focus to infrastructure investment and advisory services as major privatisations took place in Australia and New Zealand.

Morrison & Co launched Infratil Ltd, one of the world's first listed infrastructure funds, in 1994. Morrison then became an increasingly active investor and adviser in privatisations of Australasian airports, ports and energy businesses. It managed Infratil Australia Ltd from its founding in 1995 until 2000 when the fund was taken over by the Australian Infrastructure Fund. Prior to the takeover, Infratil Australia owned stakes in Perth Airport, Darwin International Airport, Alice Springs Airport, Southern Hydro, and Port of Portland in Australia (Portland, Victoria).

The New Zealand Superannuation Fund appointed Morrison to manage a global infrastructure mandate in March 2006. In 2008, Lloyd Morrison and the company published "A Measurable Goal for New Zealand", a discussion paper that called for a common economic goal for the country. It was motivated in part by forecasts showing New Zealand's economic growth trajectory would see its GDP per capita ranking among countries falling to 47th, whereas it had been ranked in the top 10 in 1950.

Marko Bogoievski took over as CEO in 2009 after Lloyd Morrison was diagnosed with leukaemia. In 2009, Morrison & Co launched the Public Infrastructure Partnership Fund (PIP Fund), New Zealand's first fund dedicated to investing in public–private partnerships (PPPs). In 2018, they established the Morrison & Co Growth Infrastructure Fund, a co-mingled fund targeting risk-adjusted returns through unlisted infrastructure assets with a strong sustainability focus.

In July 2018, Morrison took over management of Utilities Trust of Australia (UTA), an open-ended infrastructure fund established in 1994, one of Australia's first infrastructure investment funds, that had an A$6bn portfolio of core infrastructure assets. Morrison took over from Hastings Funds Management, after Westpac sold Hastings to Northill Capital in 2017, with UTA investors then voting to terminate Hasting's mandate as manager.

Over the following three years, Morrison expanded its presence outside New Zealand and Australia into Asia, Europe, UK and North America. It purchased agriculture business Sundrop Farms in May 2019, then sold it in December 2022. In 2021, Morrison raised US$3 billion for a new open-ended global infrastructure fund. Bogoievski was recognised by the IJGlobal Awards as Outstanding Individual of the Year and by the NZ Herald as a Business Hero in 2021. He left the company at the end of 2021, after 13 years as CEO. He was replaced by Paul Newfield, who was previously the Head of Australia & New Zealand.

In April 2023, Morrison acquired FiberLight for US$1 billion and announced Bill Major as CEO of Fiberlight. Also in 2023, Morrison changed its brand name from Morrison & Co to Morrison.

== Business summary ==
Infratil Ltd is a infrastructure fund that is listed on the New Zealand Exchange and the Australian Securities Exchange. Its major investments include CDC Data Centres, One NZ, Longroad Energy and Wellington Airport. Infratil pays Morrison a management fee that is tied to the total value of assets under management. Infratil's after-tax return since listing in March 1994 was 18.7% per annum to March 2022, and over the previous 10 years averaged 21.6% per annum.

The Public Infrastructure Partnership Fund is dedicated to investing in public–private partnerships. The New Zealand Superannuation Fund is the cornerstone investor in the fund and Morrison secured capital commitments from a number of New Zealand-based community trusts and institutional investors. The PIP Fund has investment capacity to deliver around NZ$1 billion of social infrastructure under PPP structures. The New Zealand Social Infrastructure Fund was established in 2010 to enable private investors to participate in the PIP Fund. On 10 December 2015 Morrison announced first financial close of PIP II, a follow-on fund also investing in New Zealand PPPs.

Utilities Trust of Australia is an open-ended infrastructure fund with a globally diversified portfolio of assets that includes Australian Registry Investments, Perth Airport, TransGrid, Phoenix Natural Gas and South East Water. UTA formerly owned M5 South West Motorway, which it sold in 2019, and the former Sydney Light Rail owner Metro Transport Sydney. In 2021, UTA was rated by GRESB as one of the top ten infrastructure funds globally and the leading fund in Oceania for its ESG performance.

In August 2020, Morrison announced the successful third and final close of the Morrison & Co Growth Infrastructure Fund (MGIF). MGIF's total fund size reached A$580 million. MGIF takes a long-term perspective of investments, focusing on the fundamental value of essential infrastructure services, and targets gross returns of 13–15% per annum.

In early 2021, Morrison committed to being climate-positive across its own operations, which means its business will eliminate carbon emissions altogether where possible or, alternatively, they will be offset through programmes that work with local communities.

In June 2021, a Morrison-managed consortium acquired 49 per cent of InfraCo Towers, the largest network of mobile tower sites in Australia, from Telstra. The consortium comprised the Future Fund as its largest investor, Sunsuper and the Commonwealth Superannuation Corporation (CSC). The business later changed its name to Amplitel Ltd.
