= South East Water =

British water utility

South East Water Limited.
- Type: Private limited company (Ltd)
- Industry: Water supply services
- Founded: 1992
- Headquarters: Snodland, Kent, United Kingdom
- Number of employees: 1100
- Parent: Des Jardin Entities (25%), NatWest Pension Trustee Limited (25%), Utilities Trust of Australia (50%)
- Website: southeastwater.co.uk

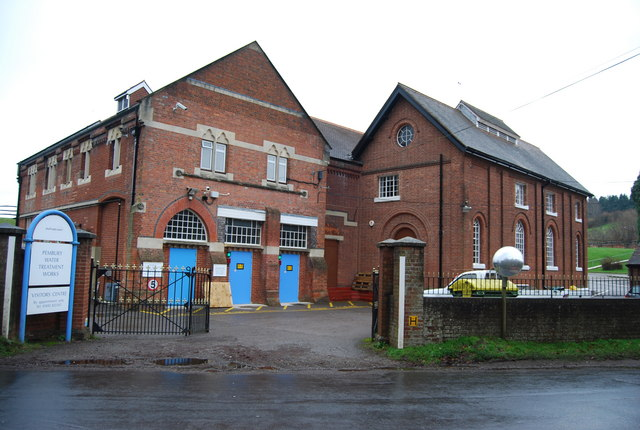
Pembury Water Treatment Works from Old Church Road, Pembury.

South East Water is a British water utility providing drinking water services to households across Kent, Sussex, Surrey, Hampshire and Berkshire. South East Water is a private limited company registered in England and Wales owned by parent company, HDF (UK) Holdings Limited. The company's shareholders are Utilities Trust of Australia, which owns 50 per cent, as well as the NatWest pension fund and Desjardins, both of which have a 25 per cent stake each.

According to the company, it supplies on average 521 million litres of drinking water per day and operates 83 water treatment works and 14,500 kilometres of its water mains across an area of 5,657 square kilometres. The company takes water from rivers, reservoirs at Ardingly and Arlington, and underground sources (aquifers) under abstraction licences issued by the Environment Agency.

== History ==
The present company came into existence in December 2007 by a merger of Mid Kent Water and an earlier separate company with the name of South East Water, thus uniting two water companies in the South East of England.

Other companies that had earlier been merged into the current company included Mid-Sussex Water Company, the Crowborough District Water Company, the Newhaven and Seaford Water Company, the Eastbourne Water Company (itself incorporating the Hailsham Water Company), the West Kent Water Company, the Mid Southern Water Company (formerly the Mid-Wessex Water Company; itself incorporating the Aldershot Gas and Water Company, the Frimley and Farnborough District Water Company, the Wokingham District Water Company, the Herriard and Lasham Water Company, the Manydown Estate Waterworks, the Hartley Wintney Waterworks, and the Maidenhead Waterworks Company), and the Burgess Hill Water Company.

The Mid Kent Water Company had been originally incorporated as an ordinary limited company in 1888, before being reincorporated by the Mid Kent Water Act 1898 (61 & 62 Vict. c. ccxxiii) as a statutory company. It absorbed the Cranbrook District Water Company by the Kent Water Act 1955 (4 & 5 Eliz. 2. c. xi).

In 2021-2022, the company's chief executive, David Hinton, received a base salary (not including bonus, pension contributions and other benefits) of £271,620. The CFO received a base salary of £222,503 over the same period.

South East Water was one of eleven water providers fined by the water regulator for England and Wales, Ofwat, in October 2022. South East Water’s fine was £3.2 million.

== Water supply issues ==
As of 21 December 2022, South East Water continued to receive criticism, including from MPs, as a result of widespread and long-lasting water outages affecting thousands of homes and businesses across its network. Bottled water stations were set up at several sites, but supplies quickly ran low. Various sites were forced to unexpectedly close at short notice to restock or as they became overwhelmed.

The Guardian reported on 21 December 2022 that South East Water had admitted that it couldn’t guarantee that all customers would have their water supply restored by Christmas Day. Speaking to Kent Live, Greg Clark, MP for Tunbridge Wells and former Cabinet Minister, said:

"I have spoken every day with the chief executive of South East Water, David Hinton. I wish I could tell you that I am confident that reliable supplies will be resumed imminently, but I’m afraid I can't."

Clark later described the leadership of South East Water as "deficient" in a crisis situation.

Clark confirmed that he had raised the issue in the House of Commons, asked the government to intervene, and further described South East Water's approach to resolving the crisis as "unacceptably bad and in some instances chaotic."

Further mass outages affected customers in June 2023, with several schools across Kent and Sussex being forced to close as a direct result of the lack of water supply. A BBC article described how elderly residents - many of whom did not have social media - were “beginning to panic and worry about how they are going to get water.” MP Nus Ghani described the situation as “groundhog day” and urged South East Water to urgently remedy the situation. On 26 June 2023 the company introduced a hosepipe ban across the area, blaming increased domestic demand through more people working at home. This was despite reservoirs in the region being almost full, following a wet winter and spring.

In June 2025, the company received a £200 million cash injection from its owners to improve its financial resilience.

In late November 2025, a major supply failure at the Pembury water treatment works (near Tunbridge Wells, Kent) left tens of thousands of customers of South East Water without running water. The plant was shut down on the evening of 29 November after the company admitted a “bad” or “chemical” batch of coagulant chemicals had contaminated the treatment process.

In early January 2026, the company reported a burst water main in the Tunbridge Wells area that left a further 24,000 properties without water supply. This was reported in addition to the contamination incident that occurred in November 2025, affecting the same supply area. Currently, South East water typically loses 100 million litres per day and is the worst rated water company as reported by OFWAT.

In May 2026, the House of Commons Environment, Food and Rural Affairs committee declared it had “no confidence” in the chief executive or the board of South East Water over its handling of supply disruption issues. In response, the chair of South East Water, Chris Train, resigned with immediate effect. The CEO David Hinton has also stepped down with the company citing that "he feels his position has become an increasing distraction from South East Water's most important priority, which is to deliver a resilient water supply for its customers". Later on that month, mass outages affected customers across Kent, which the company has blamed on an increased demand of water supply during that week's heatwave. Affected areas included Ashford, Maidstone, Herne Bay, Whitstable, as well as several suburbs in Kent and Sussex.
