= Department of Finance, Services and Innovation =

NSW Department of Finance, Services and Innovation
Department overview
- Formed: 1 July 2015
- Preceding agencies: Office of Finance and Services (2014–2015); Department of Finance and Services (2011–2014)
- Dissolved: 1 July 2019
- Superseding Department: Department of Customer Service
- Jurisdiction: New South Wales
- Headquarters: Sydney, New South Wales, Australia
- Ministers responsible: Victor Dominello, Minister for Finance, Services and Property; Matt Kean, Minister for Innovation and Better Regulation
- Department executive: Martin Hoffman, Secretary
- Child agencies: Revenue NSW; NSW Public Works; NSW Land Registry Services
- Website: www.finance.nsw.gov.au

The New South Wales Department of Finance, Services and Innovation, was a department of the Government of New South Wales that, until its 2019 abolition, functioned as a service provider to support sustainable government finances, major public works and maintenance programs, government procurement, information and communications technology, corporate and shared services, consumer protection, administration of taxation and revenue collection, and land and property administration of the government in New South Wales, Australia.

The department was previously known as the Department of Finance and Services (DFS) between April 2011 and April 2014, and the Office of Finance and Services between April 2014 and July 2015.

Following the 2019 state election most of the functions of the department were transferred to the newly-formed Department of Customer Service, with some functions transferred to The Treasury, with effect from 1 July 2019.

== Structure and responsibilities ==
Up until its abolition, the chief executive officer, entitled Secretary, of the Department was Martin Hoffman. The Department was responsible to the Minister for Finance, Services and Property, Victor Dominello and the Minister for Innovation and Better Regulation, Matt Kean. Both ministers were ultimately responsible to the Parliament of New South Wales.

The divisions of the department included:

- Corporate Services
- Government Services
  - OneGov
- Land, Property and Housing
  - Office of Registrar General (monitor and enforce performance of the NSW Land Registry Services)
  - Property NSW
  - Teacher Housing Authority
  - Waste Assets Management Corporation
- Legal Audit & Risk
- NSW Public Works
- NSW Fair Trading
- Office of Finance
- Revenue NSW
- Property and Housing Group
- State Archives & Records
- Work, Health and Safety
  - Insurance & Care NSW
  - State Insurance Regulatory Authority
  - SafeWork NSW
- Service Innovation and Strategy
  - Service NSW
- SICorp
- Telco Authority
