= Geographical Names Board of New South Wales =

Statutory body in New South Wales, Australia

Statutory authority overview
- Formed: 1966
- Jurisdiction: New South Wales
- Headquarters: Panorama Avenue, Bathurst
- Minister responsible: Jihad Dib, Minister for Customer Service
- Parent Department: Department of Customer Service
- Key document: Geographical Names Act 1966 (NSW)
- Website: www.gnb.nsw.gov.au

The Geographical Names Board of New South Wales is a statutory authority of the Department of Customer Service in the Government of New South Wales. It is the official body for naming and recording details of places and geographical names in the state of New South Wales, Australia.

The board was established in 1966 pursuant to the Geographical Names Act 1966.

== Board composition ==
The board consists of nine members, four of which are those people who hold the office of, or are a respective nominee of:

- the Surveyor General of New South Wales who is also chair of the board,
- the Department of Planning, Housing and Infrastructure,
- the State Librarian, and
- the Department of Customer Service

The other members are nominated by:

- the Local Government and Shires Association of New South Wales,
- the Royal Australian Historical Society,
- the Geographical Society of New South Wales,
- NSW Aboriginal Land Council, and
- the Chairperson of Multicultural NSW.

== Activities ==
The Geographical Names Act 1966, empowers the board to assign names to places, to investigate and determine the form, spelling, meaning, pronunciation, origin and history of any geographical name and the application of such name with regard to position, extent or otherwise.

A place is described in the Act as "any geographical or topographical feature or any district, division, locality, region, city, town, village, settlement or railway station or any other place within the territories and waters of the State of New South Wales but does not include any road, any local government area, urban area, county or district under the Local Government Act, electoral district or subdivision, or any school". The Act also specifies the procedures for formalising names.

In recent years, the board has been given the power to preserve and promote Aboriginal languages and acknowledge Aboriginal culture through place naming in NSW. The board does this by preferencing traditional Aboriginal place names or names with Aboriginal origin wherever it can. The board is dedicated to restoring traditional Aboriginal names to features with introduced names through its dual naming policy and recognising important traditional Aboriginal place names alongside long standing introduced names.

The board's policy mirrors the United States Board on Geographic Names in that it seeks to eliminate the use of possessive names from all place names in New South Wales, e.g. roads called Smith's Road are changed to Smiths Road or Smith Road.

== See also ==
- Committee for Geographical Names in Australasia
- List of cities in Australia
- Geographical Names Board of Canada
