= Revenue NSW =

Agency overview
- Preceding agencies: Office of State Revenue; State Debt Recovery Office
- Jurisdiction: New South Wales
- Headquarters: The Lang Centre, 132 Marsden Street, Parramatta, New South Wales
- Minister responsible: Hon. Courtney Houssos MP, Minister for Finance
- Agency executive: Scott Johnston, Deputy Secretary, Chief Commissioner of State Revenue, Commissioner of Fines Administration
- Parent Agency: Department of Customer Service
- Key documents: Land Tax Act 1956; Payroll Tax Act 2007; Stamp Duties Act 1920
- Website: www.revenue.nsw.gov.au

Revenue NSW is an administrative division of the Government of New South Wales that has responsibility for collecting New South Wales taxes. It was rebranded from the Office of State Revenue (OSR) and its fines division the State Debt Recovery Office (SDRO) on 31 July 2017. It was formerly an administrative division of the New South Wales Department of Customer Service until 6 July 2020, when it became a stand-alone division of the department.

Revenue NSW administers state taxation and revenue programs for and on behalf of the people of NSW. The agency manages fines and administers grants and subsidies to the community and businesses across NSW. They also recover debt to provide an equitable outcome for the community. The agency helps to develop policy, implement legislation, collect revenue, process and enforce outstanding fines and penalties. It administers state taxation laws, including the Land Tax Act 1956, Payroll Tax Act 2007 and the Stamp Duties Act 1920.

In 2016–2017, Revenue NSW collected more than A$29.4 billion in revenue.

The chief executive officer of Revenue NSW is the Deputy Secretary, Chief Commissioner of State Revenue and Commissioner of Fines Administration, currently Scott Johnston. The agency reports to the Minister for Customer Service. Ultimately the minister is responsible to the Parliament of New South Wales.

== Grants ==
On behalf of the NSW Government, the agency administers grants for:

- First home – New Home Scheme
- First Home Owner Grant (New Homes) scheme
- New South Wales New Home Grant Scheme
- Regional Relocation Grant
- Small Business Grant

== See also ==
- Taxation in Australia
