= Minister for Customer Service and Digital Government =

Minister in the Government of New South Wales

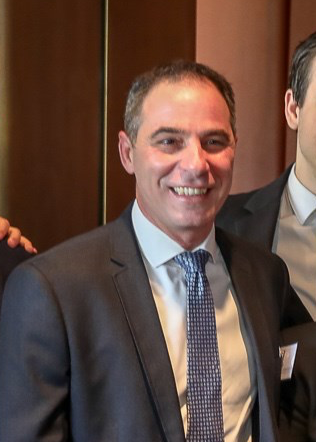
- Incumbent; Jihad Dib since 5 April 2023
- Department of Customer Service
- Style: The Honourable
- Nominator: Premier of New South Wales
- Appointer: Governor of New South Wales
- Inaugural holder: John Waddy (as Minister for Services)
- Formation: 3 January 1975

The Minister for Customer Service and Digital Government is a minister in the Government of New South Wales responsible for administering legislation and policy in relation to the state's revenues, consumer affairs regulations, innovation policy, property and housing administration, co-operative societies, and government records in New South Wales, Australia. The minister's responsibilities also include matters relating to government services and service delivery, and their improvement.

The minister administers their portfolio through the Customer Service cluster, in particular the Department of Customer Service, Service NSW, the State Records Authority, NSW Registry of Births, Deaths and Marriages and a range of other government agencies.

Ultimately the ministers are responsible to the Parliament of New South Wales.

== List of ministers ==
=== Customer service and digital government ===
The following individuals have served as Minister for Customer Service and Digital Government, or any precedent titles:

Ministerial title	Minister	Party	Ministry	Term start	Term end	Time in office	Notes
Minister for Services	John Waddy	Liberal	Lewis (1) (2)	3 January 1975	23 January 1976	1 year, 20 days	
Minister for Services	Ron Mulock	Labor	Wran (1)	14 May 1976	10 February 1977	272 days	
Minister for Services	William Haigh	Labor	Wran (1)	10 February 1977	19 October 1978	1 year, 251 days	
Minister for Services	Bill Crabtree	Labor	Wran (2) (3)	19 October 1978	2 October 1981	2 years, 348 days	
Minister for Services	Peter Anderson	Labor	Wran (4)	2 October 1981	26 May 1982	236 days	
Minister for Administrative Services	Matt Singleton	National	Greiner (1)	25 March 1988	24 January 1989	305 days	
Minister for Administrative Services	Robert Webster	National	Greiner (1)	24 January 1989	6 June 1991	2 years, 133 days	
Minister for Administrative Services	Anne Cohen	Liberal	Greiner (2); Fahey (1) (2) (3)	6 June 1991	4 April 1995	3 years, 302 days	
Minister for Public Works and Services	Michael Knight	Labor	Carr (1)	4 April 1995	15 December 1995	255 days	
Minister for Public Works and Services	Carl Scully	Labor	Carr (1)	15 December 1995	1 December 1997	1 year, 351 days	
Minister for Public Works and Services	Ron Dyer	Labor	Carr (2)	1 December 1997	8 April 1999	1 year, 128 days	
Minister for Public Works and Services	Morris Iemma	Labor	Carr (3)	8 April 1999	2 April 2003	3 years, 359 days	
Minister for the State Plan (Note: The State Plan was intended to provide better service delivery across the public sector in New South Wales.)	Linda Burney	Labor	Keneally	8 December 2009	28 March 2011	1 year, 110 days	
Minister for Finance and Services	Greg Pearce	Liberal	O'Farrell	3 April 2011	1 August 2013	2 years, 120 days	
Minister for Finance and Services	Andrew Constance	Liberal	O'Farrell	1 August 2013	23 April 2014	265 days	
Minister for Finance and Services	Dominic Perrottet	Liberal	Baird (1)	23 April 2014	2 April 2015	2 years, 282 days	
Minister for Finance, Services and Property	Dominic Perrottet	Liberal	Baird (2)	2 April 2015	30 January 2017	2 years, 282 days	
Minister for Finance, Services and Property	Victor Dominello	Liberal	Berejiklian (1)	30 January 2017	23 February 2019	6 years, 57 days	
Minister for Customer Service	Victor Dominello	Liberal	Berejiklian (2); Perrottet (1)	2 April 2019	31 March 2021	6 years, 57 days	
Minister for Customer Service and Digital	Victor Dominello	Liberal	Berejiklian (2); Perrottet (1)	31 March 2021	21 December 2021	6 years, 57 days	
Minister for Customer Service and Digital Government	Victor Dominello	Liberal	Perrottet (2)	21 December 2021	28 March 2023	6 years, 57 days	
Minister for Customer Service and Digital Government	Jihad Dib	Labor	Minns	5 April 2023	incumbent	3 years, 227 days	

== See also ==
- List of New South Wales government agencies
