= Parliament House, Sydney =

Legislature in New South Wales, Australia

Parliament House
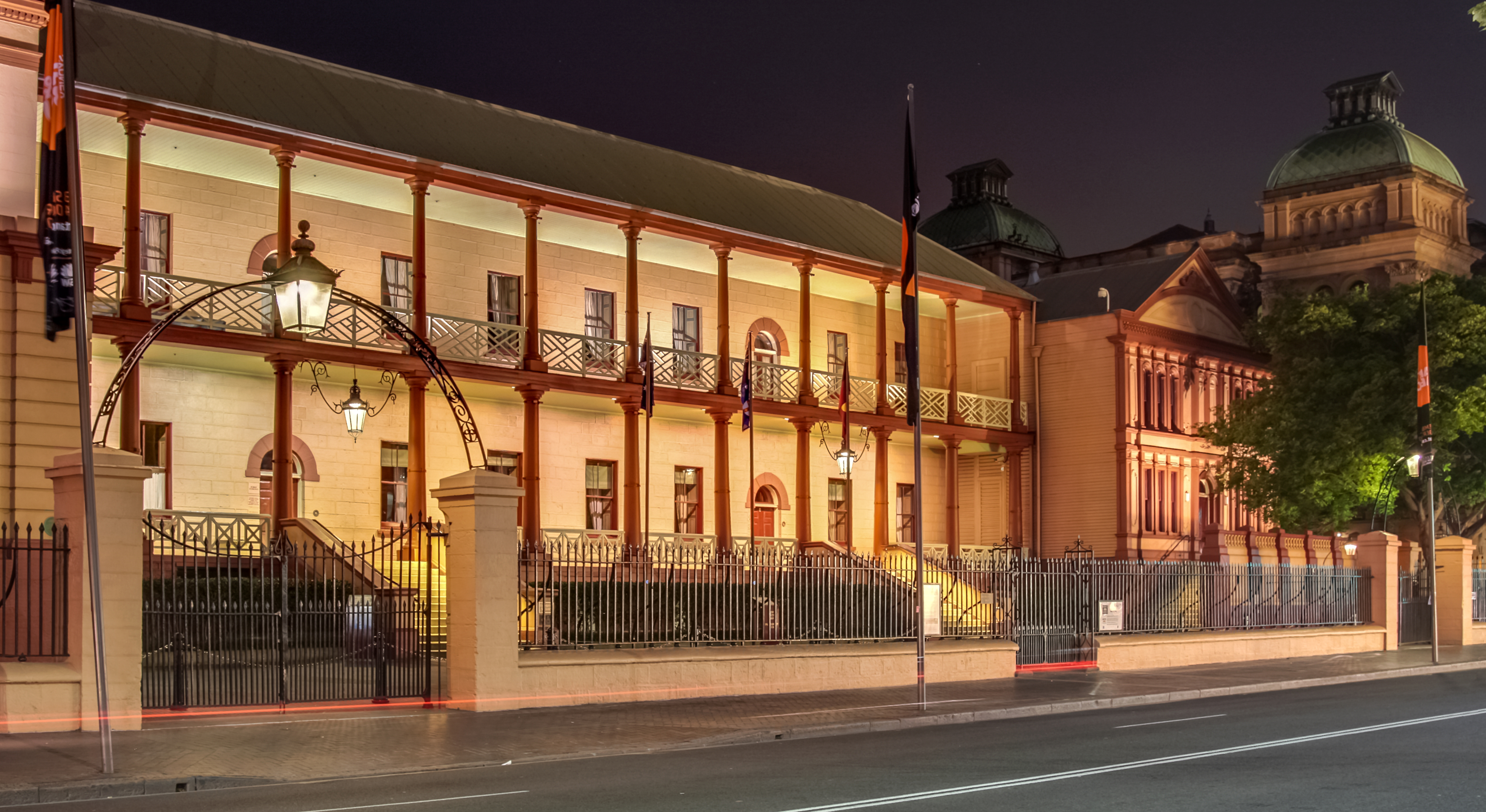
- Parliament of New South Wales

- Location within Sydney

General information
- Architectural style: Georgian; Neo-gothic
- Location: 6 Macquarie Street, Sydney NSW 2000, Australia
- Opened: 1856; 170 years ago
- Owner: The Crown in right of New South Wales (State of New South Wales)

Website
- https://www.parliament.nsw.gov.au/Pages/home.aspx

New South Wales Heritage Register
- Official name: Parliament House; Parliament of New South Wales; Parliamentary Precincts; Rum Hospital
- Type: state heritage (built)
- Criteria: a., b., c., d., f., g.
- Designated: 19 April 2002
- Reference no.: 1615
- Type: Parliament House
- Category: Government and Administration

Parliament House, Sydney is a group of heritage-listed buildings which houses the Parliament of the state of New South Wales. The main building is located on the east side of Macquarie Street in Sydney, the capital of New South Wales. The façade consists of a two-storey Georgian building, the oldest public building in the City of Sydney, flanked by two neo-gothic additions containing the parliamentary chambers. These buildings are linked to a 1970s twelve-storey office block at the rear, facing onto the Domain. It is also variously known as the Parliament of New South Wales, Parliamentary Precinct and the Rum Hospital.

Built with the initial purpose of a public hospital, unlike the parliamentary buildings of Australia's other capital cities, Sydney's Parliament House is not grand in its architectural appearance. Several plans for a new building have been unveiled in the past, but none have come to fruition. It was added to the New South Wales State Heritage Register on 19 April 2002.

== Layout ==
The main entrances are contained in a two-storey building with a colonnaded front verandah. On the ground floor, there are two entrance halls. Between these halls is the Parkes Room, which is used for small committee meetings and events. The upstairs rooms are used by Hansard. To the north of this building is the chamber of the Legislative Assembly, the lower house. The colour scheme of the chamber is green, following the colours in the House of Commons of the United Kingdom. At one end of the room is the speaker's chair, and in front of this is a table holding the mace. Government members sit in the two rows of seating to the speaker's right, and opposition members to the left. There are galleries for the press behind the speaker, Hansard to the speaker's left, guests of the speaker opposite the speaker and the public above the speaker's gallery and to the speaker's right.

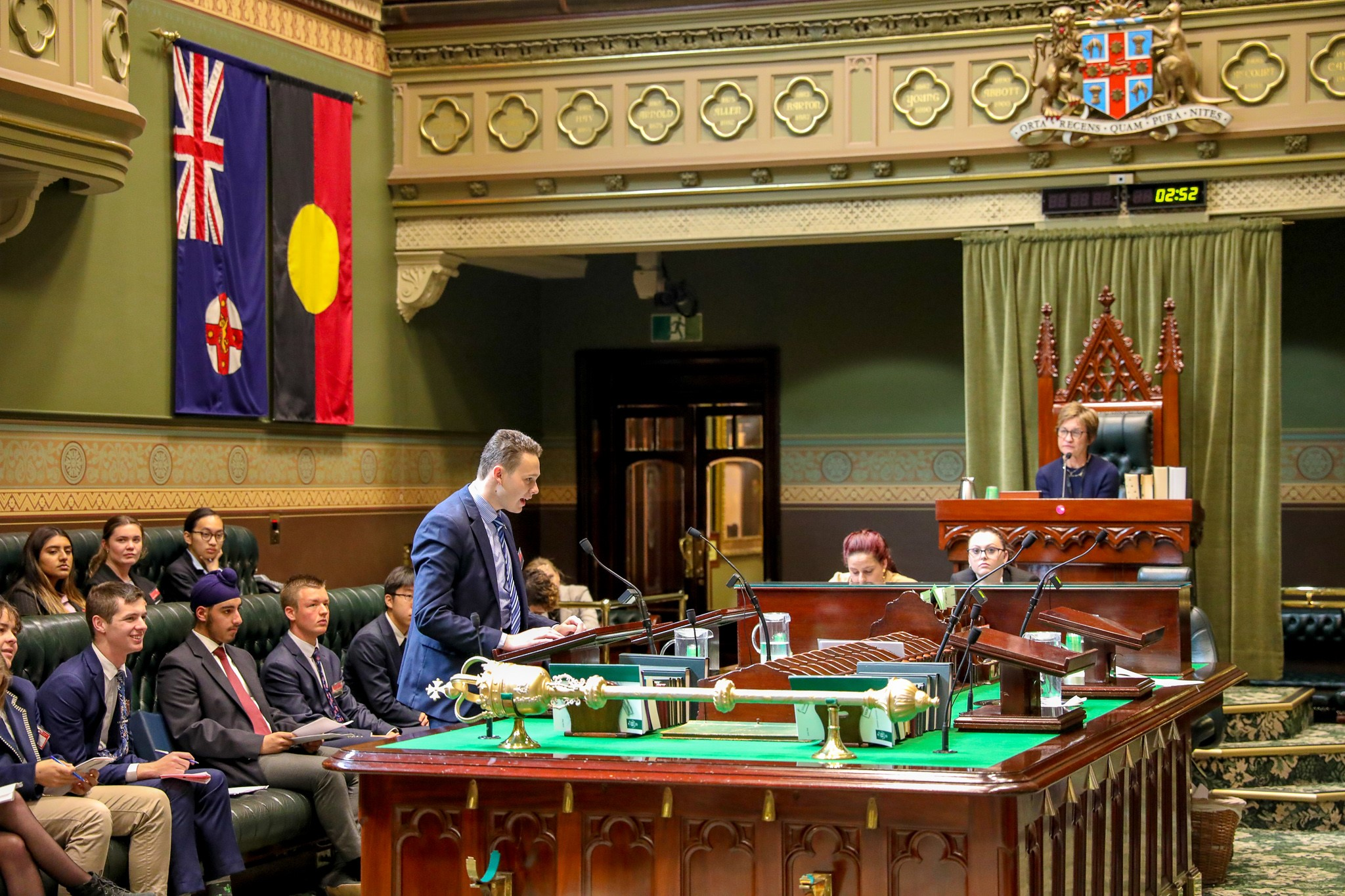
Legislative Assembly

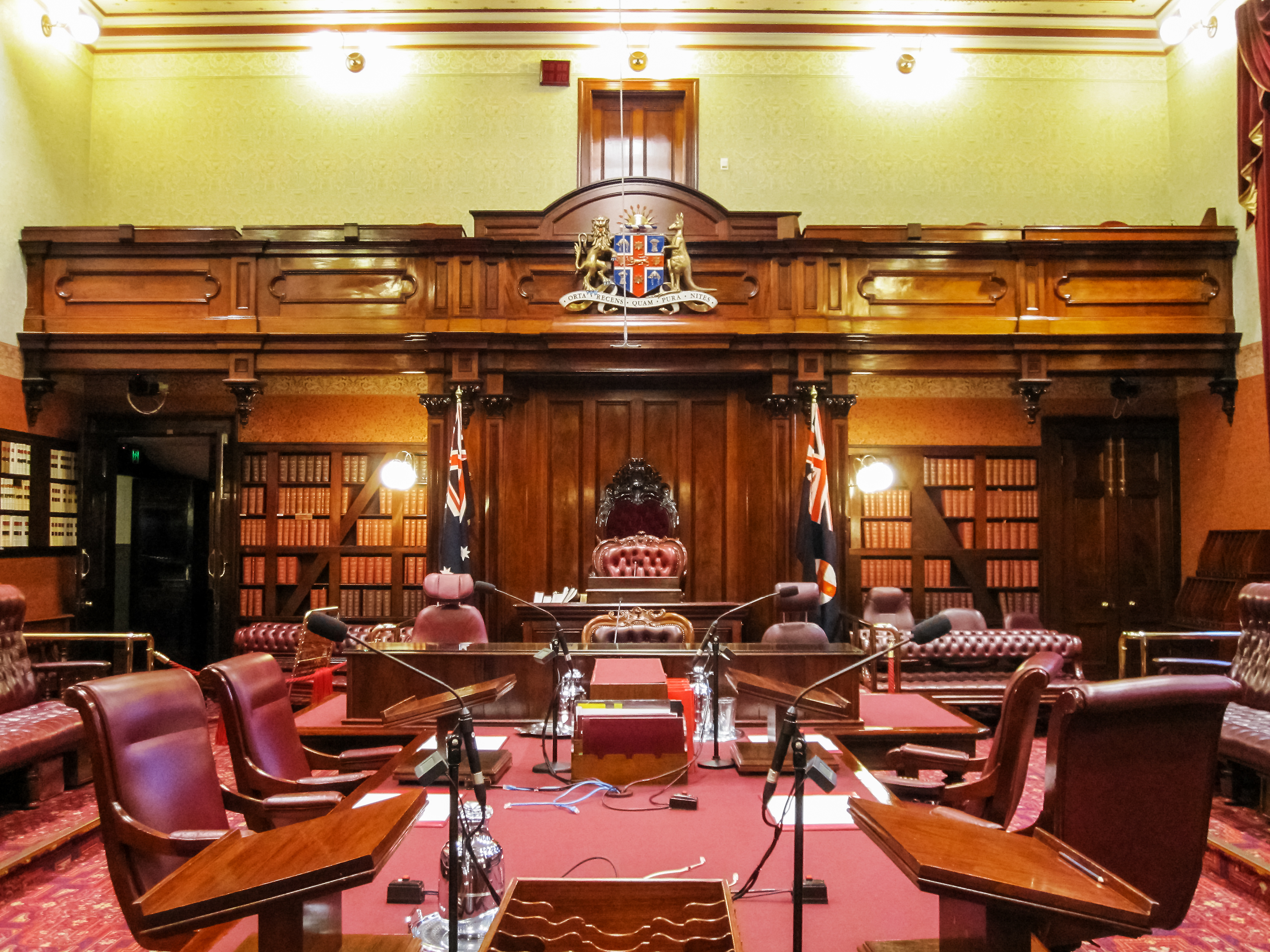
Legislative Council

At the opposite end of the entrance building is the Legislative Council chamber. Here, the colour scheme is red, representing the House of Lords. This chamber contains a vice-regal chair, for use by the monarch or his representative, the governor, and the chair of the president of the council. Both chairs are made from red cedar, the vice-regal chair in 1856 and the president's chair in 1886. The table in front of the chairs was also made in 1856 from red cedar. The wall behind the two chairs is covered by bookshelves holding the Hansard records. The chamber is also decorated with seven busts, four depicting early presidents of the council in ceremonial dress and three of other prominent former members in Roman togas. As in the lower house, government members sit on the president's right and opposition members on the left.

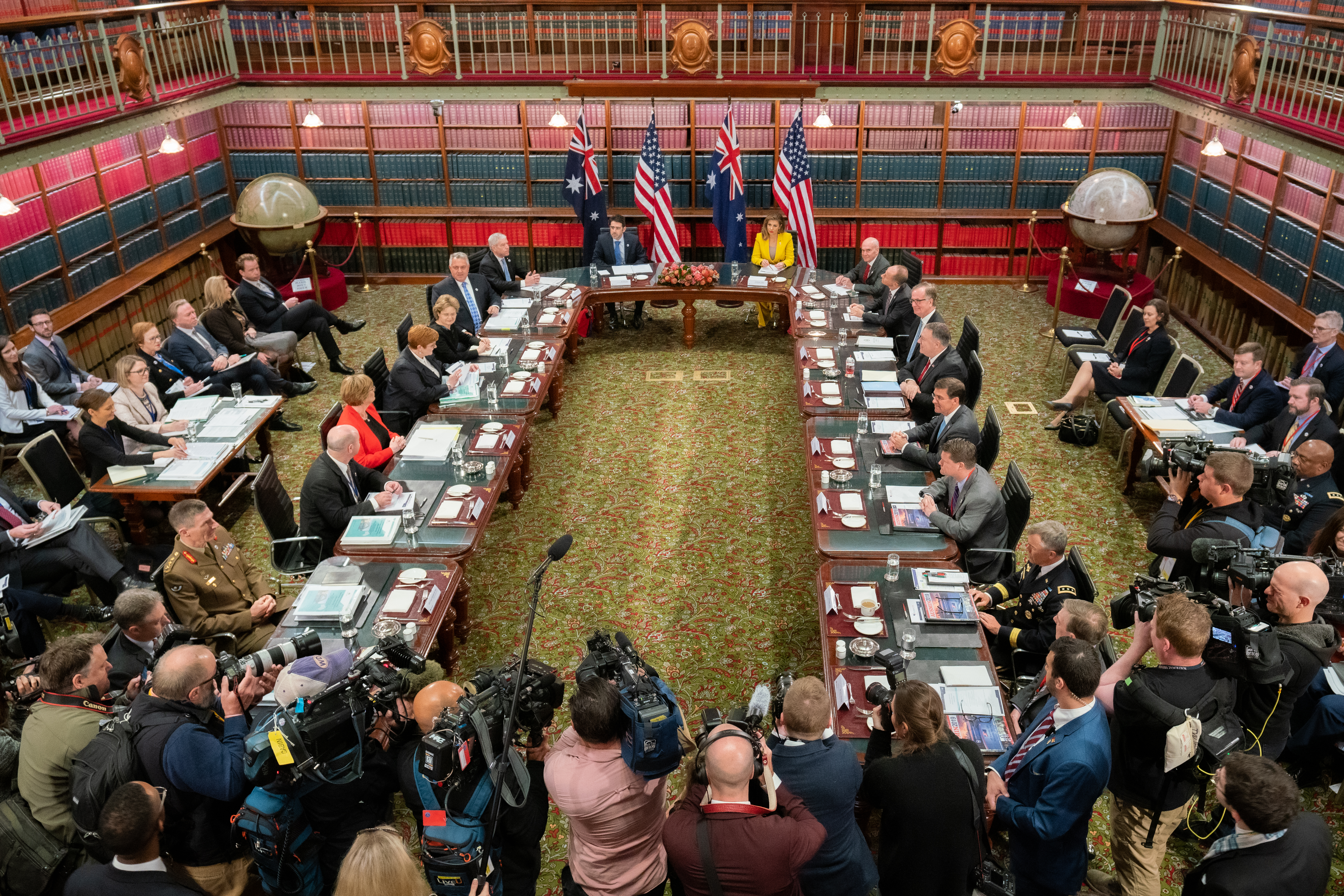
The Jubilee Room

Behind the entrance building is the Jubilee Room, used for committee meetings and public functions. In this area, which is open to the public, there is also the Fountain Court, an exhibition venue containing a fountain by Robert Woodward. Beneath the Fountain Court is a 166-seat theatrette and above it a roof garden sometimes used for functions. Together with a small post office, these 1970s features form a "square doughnut"-shaped building linking the streetfront buildings with a 12-storey block at the rear. This block, with views over the Domain contains offices for members and other staff and meetings rooms, as well as dining facilities, a fitness area and car parking and service areas. The building has a power co-generation unit that serves Sydney Hospital and the State Library of New South Wales as well as Parliament House.

== History ==
The partially remodelled Parliament House (the original North Wing of the Rum Hospital) in 1848, with the added Legislative Council chamber from 1843.

The oldest part of Parliament House was originally built as the north wing of Governor Macquarie's "Rum Hospital". Macquarie Street was created and land in the Domain was assigned by Governor Macquarie in 1810. As there was no funding from the British government, a contract to build the hospital was arranged involving convict labour and a monopoly on rum imports. The building of three two storey colonnaded buildings was completed in 1816 and was praised as "elegant and commodious" but also criticised for both its design and construction by Francis Greenway. Defects resulting from short cuts taken by the builders were still being discovered in the 1980s.

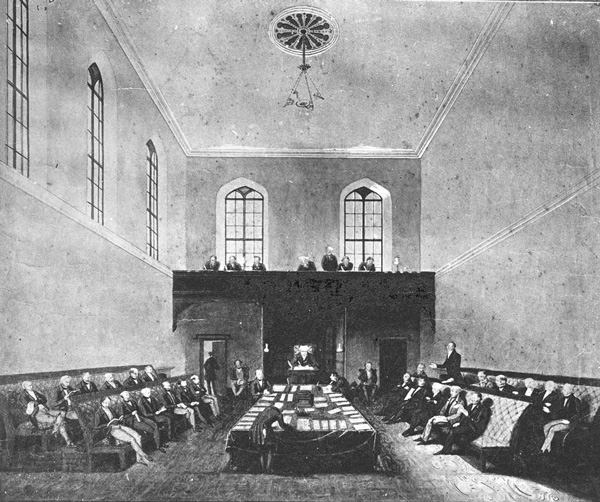
The first Legislative Council meeting in the chamber in 1843

The north wing was the chief surgeon's quarters, although at one point it was used as law courts. When the Legislative Council was formed in 1824, it did not have a permanent home and met in places such as the old Government House. In 1829, the council's membership increased from five to 15 members, and it began to meet in the downstairs northern room of the surgeon's quarters from 21 August. Only two rooms were left for the chief surgeon, with the remaining five rooms used as offices by the clerk of the Executive and Legislative Councils and other government officials. From 1831 to 1836, the clerk was also the curator of Australia's first museum, a small natural history collection which became the beginning of the Australian Museum collection.

The Legislative Council was increased to 36 members by the new colonial constitution in 1843. The room in the old building was no longer large enough, and so a new chamber was added to the north of the building. This chamber became the home of the new Legislative Assembly when a bicameral system was introduced in 1856. The Legislative Council was relocated to a prefabricated iron building that was assembled at the southern end of the original hospital building. The building had been manufactured in Scotland by engineering firm Robertson & Lister and originally shipped to Melbourne. It was purchased for £1,835. The cost of erecting and furnishing the building as well as the new offices was £4,475. The incomplete building was used first for the official opening of the new parliament on 22 May 1856.

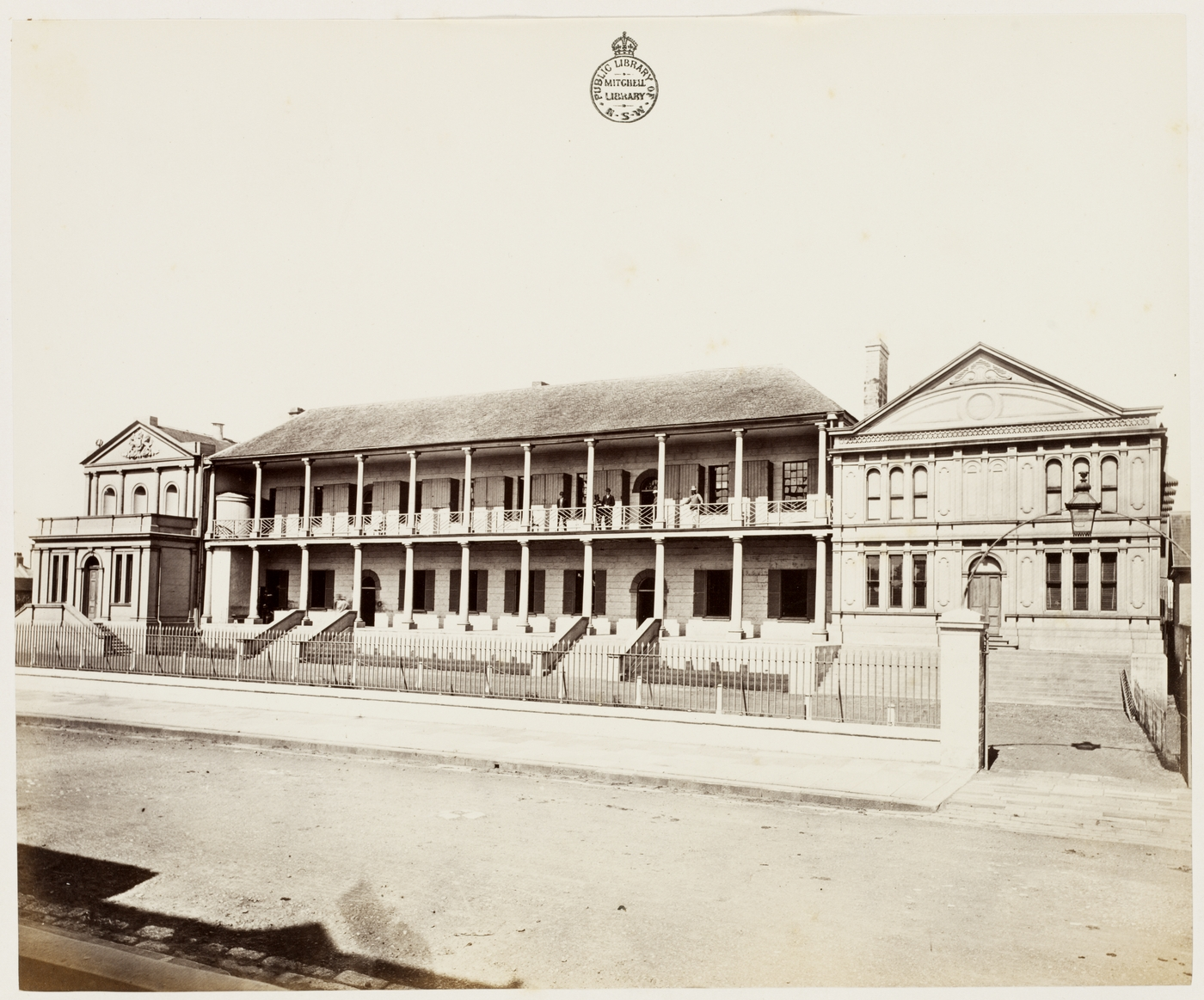
Parliament House pictured in 1872

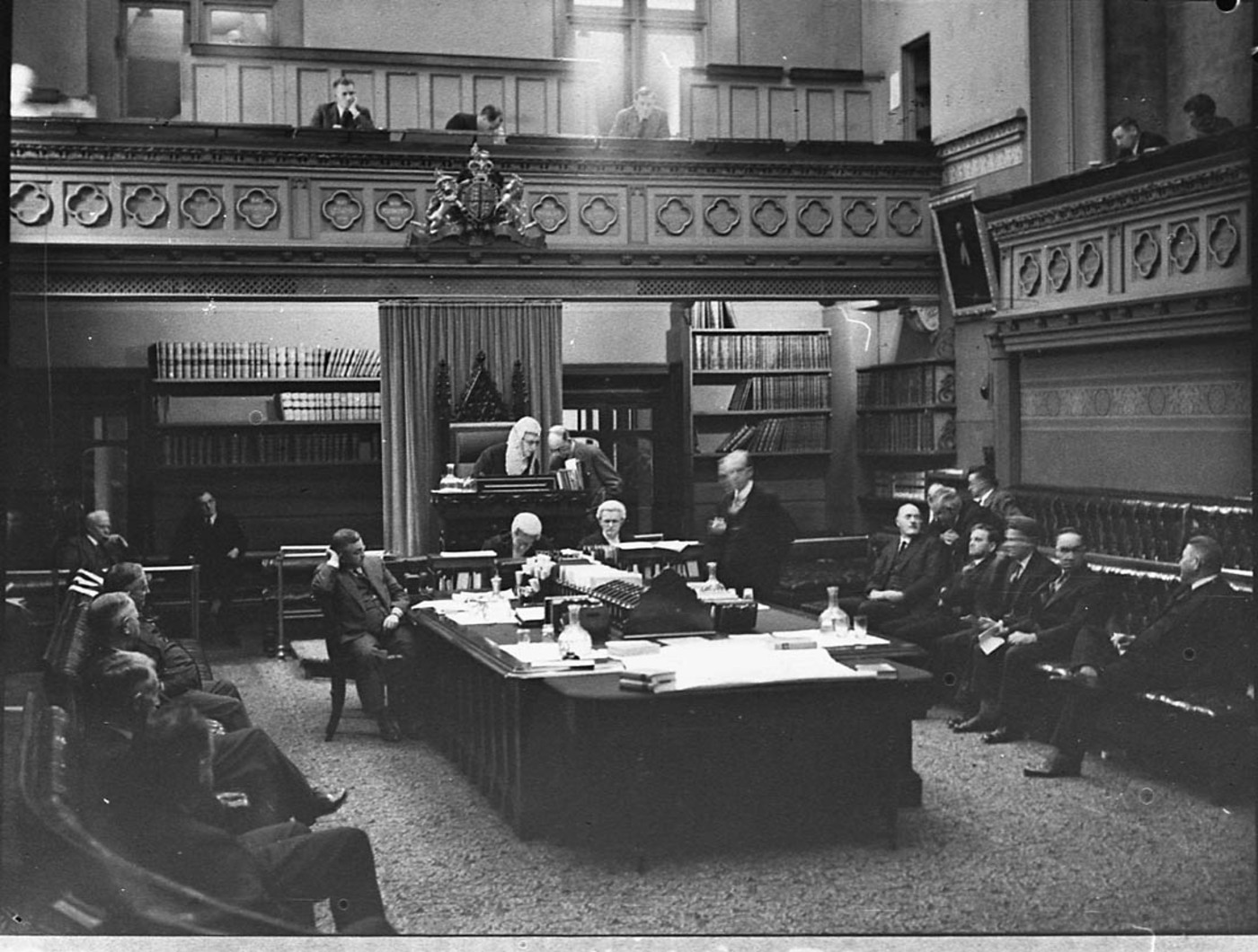
A bill being passed in the rebuilt Legislative Assembly, 1937

The new chamber was not without its problems. The walls, originally lined with packing boards covered with hessian and plastered, and the curved iron roof cause problems with acoustics, lighting and ventilation. The roof was replaced with slate in 1959. Other changes followed as the façade was moved 3 metres (9.8 ft) closer to the street in 1892–93. Deterioration in the southern wall became apparent during the 1920s, and wooden props were added to the outside of the southern wall and inside the chamber to hold up the ceiling. The southern wall was entirely rebuilt in the 1930s.

In the meantime, a dining room was constructed behind the hospital building by 1969 and the Parliamentary Library, which in 1850 had been moved to the original Legislative Council chamber, expanded and relocated back into the two remaining ground floor rooms, which were united to form the Greenway Room. The Jubilee Room was built as a reading room for the library in 1906.

In 2013, a man threatened to blow up parts of the building, but was prevented from doing so by NSW police. They stormed his car and took the man into custody.

=== Rebuilding proposals and extension ===
In 1861, William Henry Lynn won a competition to redesign the Parliament House in Gothic Revival style, but the project was never completed for unknown reasons.

In 1888, the foundation stone was laid for a new building which would have included a main entrance on Hunter Street (current location of the State Library of New South Wales), leading to a grand hall, and another one facing The Domain and the harbour, with each side having about a 350-foot-long (110 m) frontage. The land for this site had already been bought in 1879, and the decision made in 1882.

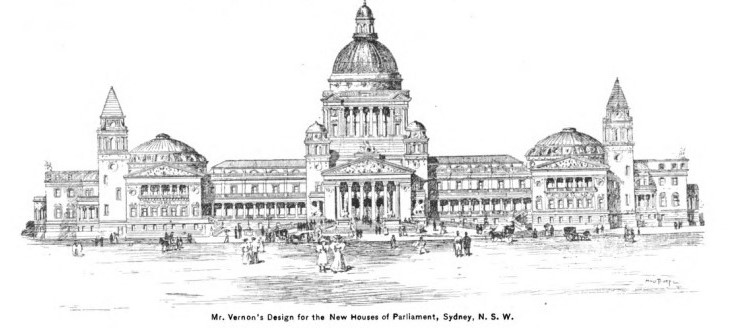
Walter Liberty Vernon's design for a new Parliament House, one of many proposals that were never realised

In 1897, another design was produced by Walter Liberty Vernon, which was to be located 240 feet (73 m) away from Macquarie Street, and stretch from Sydney Hospital to the statue of Governor Bourke (now in front of the State Library of New South Wales).

In 1907, a new neoclassical façade was planned for the building, together with a widening of Macquarie Street and a new building for the Law Courts. The plan fell through in 1908 when the government only allocated £74,051 of the required £146,000.

In 1935 a proposal was made to demolish the old Parliament House, alongside the Sydney Hospital and the Sydney Mint, to be replaced by a new parliament House facing Bridge Street, as well as a Law Courts complex facing Martin Place. The plan was however postponed due to expenses related to the Great Depression in 1936.

In 1964 a document titled Report and Development Plans for the Eastern Side of Macquarie Street was prepared by the New South Wales Government Architect. The plan envisaged the removal of Sydney Hospital to another location to make way for a monumental new Parliament House. The Mint, Hyde Park Barracks and the Rum Hospital's northern building (part of the current Parliament House) were to be refurbished and adapted for reuse. The proposed new Parliament House was planned with an extensive civic square with a massive fountain to terminate the view along Martin Place. However, change of government from Labor to Liberal in 1965 slowed the pace of major public works.

In 1970 plans for a new Parliament House were spearheaded by the Parliamentary Librarian, Dr Russell Cope. An Advisory Committee was established, representing both Houses and all political parties to determine accommodation needs for the Parliament. At the time much of Parliament House was substandard and a possible firetrap. The majority of members shared rooms. Even the Leader of the Opposition occupied an inadequate space over a hot and noisy boiler room.

In 1972, the brief and a development plan, prepared by the Government Architect, were tabled in Parliament. After a review, the Treasury recommended the deletion of the swimming pool, but Premier Robert Askin rejected this advice. Unlike the proposed demolition proposed in the 1964 scheme, the 1972 development plan required the new building to be constructed entirely within the boundary of the existing site, while leaving space for future additions to the State Library of New South Wales. Added to this restraint the work of the Parliament needed to continue through the entire construction period. To achieve this the construction was divided into a number of stages, including a temporary accommodation building on the parliamentary tennis court and bowling green.

In 1975, Premier Tom Lewis asked for the inclusion of an auditorium and a media centre. The same year tenders were called for the initial works (demolition and excavation). The initial works also included the stone by stone relocation of an historic building, Richmond Villa, to Kent Street, Millers Point, Sydney. Design and construction documentation was the responsibility of the New South Wales Government Architect, while construction management was tendered to the private sector. Hornibrook was the successful tenderer.

Parliament House seen from above in 2026

In 1979, once the first stage facing the Domain was completed, the second stage was constructed to link the first stage with the existing heritage buildings facing Macquarie Street. Fountain Court and its fountain, designed by Robert Woodward, was completed in 1983. The last stage of the rebuilding program was completed in 1985, with the interiors of the chambers of the Legislative Council and Legislative Assembly restored to their appearance in 1892. The old Surgeon's Quarters of the Rum Hospital, together with the former Parliamentary Library, were refurbished in a manner consistent with the two restored chambers.

== Artworks ==
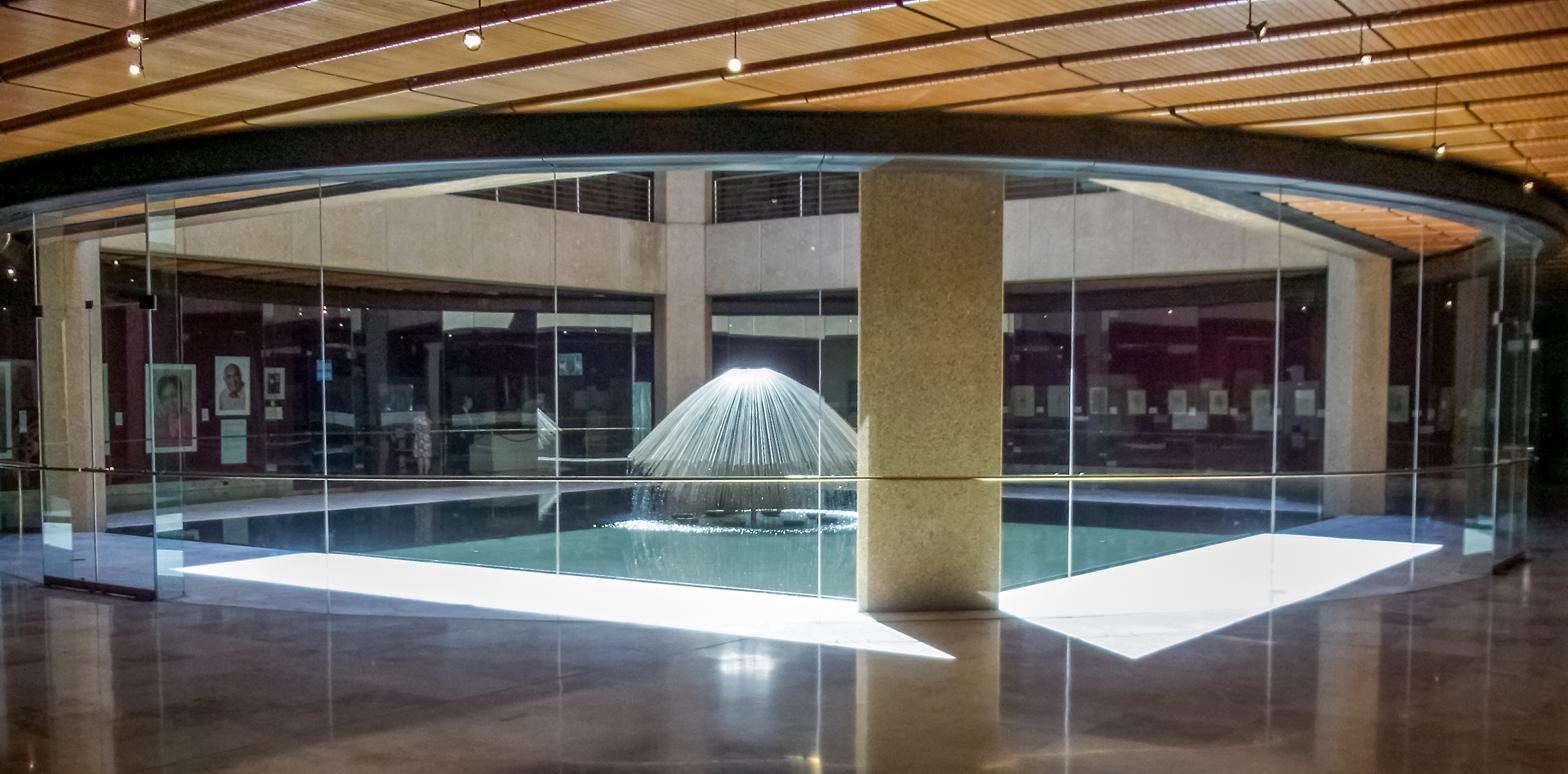
Fountain Court with fountain design by Robert Woodward

Many art works at Parliament House were on loan from the Art Gallery of New South Wales. The rebuilding project was seen as an opportunity acquire new works and a percentage of the overall budget was set aside for their purchase. Four women received commissions for works to be hung in prominent areas of the new building. In the dining area used for State receptions hang two tapestries by Fay Bottrell. In the main lift lobby Margaret Grafton's tapestry depicts the coat of arms of New South Wales. A series of wall hangings by Heather Dorrough are in the staff dining room, while the historically referenced depiction of Parliament House by Kitzpatrick hangs in the Fountain Court.

Members, ministers rooms and staff rooms are hung with either framed prints or photographs by contemporary Australian artists. A number of works on canvas were also purchased, the most notable being a portrait of Patrick White by Brett Whiteley.

== Heritage listing ==
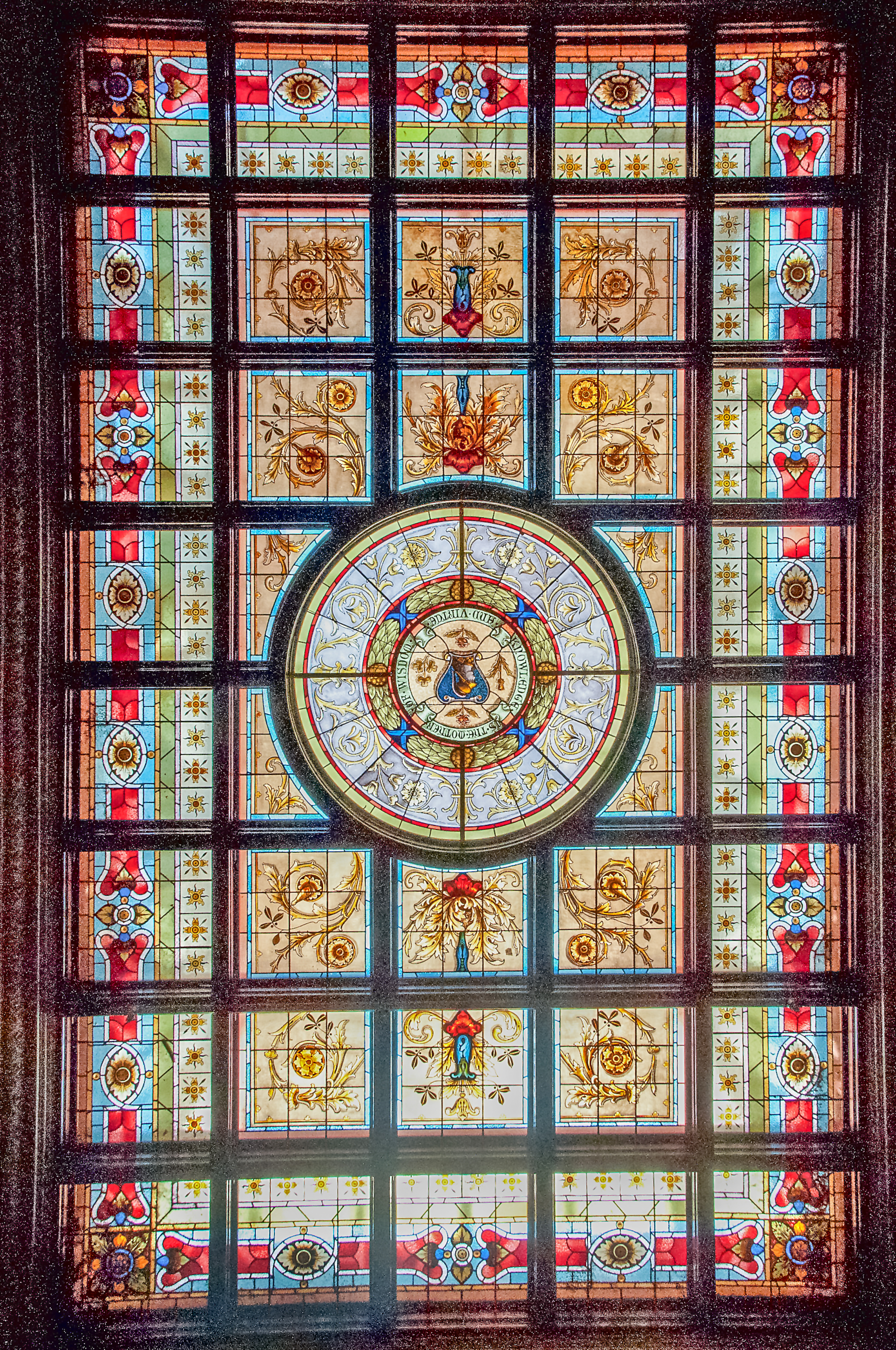
Stained glass ceiling in the Jubilee Room (formerly the main reading room of the Parliamentary Library)

Parliament House is of exceptional historical and social value. It has played a key role in the history of Australia from an early symbol of colonial government and civil improvement to its long tenure as the first NSW Parliament House and association with the Federation of the Australian colonies.

The Parliament House and the Mint Museum are the two surviving wings of the triple wing General Hospital, which was commenced in 1811. Built just 20 years after first settlement, the hospital was part of Macquarie's sweeping building campaign which included schools, barracks, orphanages, churches and storehouses. As Governor Macquarie had been refused funding by London, he entered into an agreement with three businessmen who proposed to build the hospital for three years' exclusive rights to the importation of rum and the hospital became known as The Rum Hospital.

A preserved section of the 1856 building's wall, in the Legislative Council chamber.

The north wing was requisitioned and converted to accommodate the first NSW Parliament House in 1829 because it was the largest public building in New South Wales at that time. Housing the Colonial Representative Government it was the first Parliament in Australia. Aside from its significance as the legislative arm of government in New South Wales, Parliament House has played a key role in the history of Australia as two important conventions were held to look at the issues of Federation of the colonies and the drafting of the Australian Constitution. Parliament House is significant for its association with important social and political figures of the nineteenth and twentieth centuries.

The Parliamentary precincts comprise the original old colonial Georgian building known as the Rum Hospital, which was finished in 1816 as well as later additions and extensions to the Parliament buildings. A new chamber was constructed at the northern end of the building in 1842 to accommodate the partly elected and partly nominee Council which was established with the new constitution of 1842. The Legislative Council is a pre-fabricated cast-iron building, initially shipped to Melbourne from Glasgow, Scotland, before being sent to Sydney as one of the two parliamentary chambers and is still a seat of government in NSW today. The centre wing, which was erected on poor foundations, was demolished in 1879 and the replacement building, the Sydney Hospital, was finished in 1894.

As part of Sydney's oldest remaining complex of public buildings, Parliament House has been at the centre of the history of New South Wales and continues to play a key role in the history of New South Wales as the seat of government today.

Parliament House, Sydney was listed on the New South Wales State Heritage Register on 19 April 2002 having satisfied the following criteria.

The place is important in demonstrating the course, or pattern, of cultural or natural history in New South Wales.

Parliament House has played a long and central part in the affairs of the State, originally as the first permanent hospital in Australia and then as the Parliament of New South Wales. It is associated with the changing political requirements of the colony and NSW's history as it is a permanent institution with a continuing history.

The place has a strong or special association with a person, or group of persons, of importance of cultural or natural history of New South Wales's history.

Many events of historical significance have occurred within the parliamentary precincts of New South Wales. The Parliament of New South Wales was the first legislature to be established in Australia and it was integral in the push for responsible self-government in 1856. The Parliament of New South Wales also played a significant role in the move to Federation by holding two conventions on the issue of federation and the drafting of the Australian Constitution in the 1890s.

The place is important in demonstrating aesthetic characteristics and/or a high degree of creative or technical achievement in New South Wales.

The building is an example of early colonial architecture. Completed in 1816. Built as part of Governor Macquarie's public building and town planning programs which established infrastructure for the colony.

The place has a strong or special association with a particular community or cultural group in New South Wales for social, cultural or spiritual reasons.

In December 1792 Governor Phillip proclaimed the open space which became the Botanic Gardens, Domain, Hyde Park and Macquarie Street for government use. The street itself was proclaimed in 1810 by Governor Macquarie. At first Macquarie Street only ran from Hyde Park to Bent Street, but in 1845 was extended in both directions – north to Benelong Point and south through Hyde Park to Surry Hills. The Hyde Park section was closed again in 1851.

Furthermore, the Parliament of NSW is important to the general public as it has helped shape the society we live in today. For example, the Parliament has played an important role in the push for women's suffrage proposing several bills for female suffrage between 1891 and 1901. These bills generally passed the Lower House but were defeated in the Upper House. New South Wales gave women the vote in July 1902.

The place possesses uncommon, rare or endangered aspects of the cultural or natural history of New South Wales.

The building was part of the first permanent hospital in Australia and held the first Parliament in Australia. It is the oldest public building in the City of Sydney. The building is a rare example of a cultural building which has continuously operated as a working environment.

The place is important in demonstrating the principal characteristics of a class of cultural or natural places/environments in New South Wales.

The Parliament is representative as a fine example of old colonial Georgian architecture in New South Wales.

== See also ==
- Australian non-residential architectural styles
