= Permanent Committee on Place Names =

Australian and New Zealand naming committee

The Permanent Committee on Place Names (PCPN) is a geographical naming authority composed of the various Australian and New Zealand committees on geographical names. The PCPN started in 1984 as the Committee for Geographical Names in Australia (CGNA) and it was renamed in 2005. It was integrated within the Intergovernmental Committee on Surveying and Mapping (ICSM) in 1993. It is also associated with the Geospatial and Earth Monitoring Division of Geoscience Australia. It contributes to the United Nations Group of Experts on Geographical Names.

== Annual meetings ==
Annual meetings followed at:-

- Bathurst (NSW) - 1985
- Adelaide - 1986
- Darwin - 1987
- Brisbane - 1988
- Hobart - 2010
- Adelaide - 2011
- Brisbane - 2012
- Canberra - 2013

== Official authorities ==
The authorities that work on geographic names and are members of the committee, and the enabling legislation, are as follows:

- Australian Capital Territory - National Memorials Committee - National Memorials Ordinance 1928
- New South Wales - Geographical Names Board of New South Wales - Geographical Names Act 1966
- New Zealand Geographic Board Ngā Pou Taunaha o Aotearoa
- Northern Territory - Place Names Committee for the Northern Territory - Place Names Act 1978
- Queensland - The Department of Geographic information - Queensland Place Names Act 1988
- South Australia - Geographical Names Board of South Australia - Geographical Names Act 1969
- Tasmania - Nomenclature Board of Tasmania - Survey Co-ordination Act 1944 amendments of 1955 and 1964
- Victoria - Place Names Committee - Survey Co-ordination (Place Names) Act 1965, updated to Geographic Place Names Act 1998
- Western Australia - Landgate - Land Administration Act 1997 (originally, prior to the Land Administration Act the Nomenclature Advisory Committee, appointed in 1936 ); Western Australian Place Names and Addressing

== Additional members ==
- Antarctic Names Committee of Australia
- Australian Surveying and Land Information Group
- Department of Defence - Army
- Department of Defence - Navy

== See also ==
- Gazetteer of Australia
- Suburbs and localities (Australia)
- Surveying in Australia
