= NSW Land Registry Services =

Agency of the Government of New South Wales

- Predecessor: New South Wales Land and Property Information
- Founded: 1 July 2017
- Headquarters: Lodgment Office, Level 30, 175 Liverpool Street, Sydney, Australia
- Area served: New South Wales
- Services: Titling & Land registration services
- Owner: First State Super; The Infrastructure Fund; Royal Bank of Scotland Pension Fund; UTA Registry Investments Trust.
- Website: www.nswlrs.com.au

NSW Land Registry Services (NSW LRS) is the business name of Australian Registry Investments (ARI), the operator of land titling and registry services in the Australian state of New South Wales. It is responsible for the state's land titles and property information and operates a registry under a 35-year concession with the Government of New South Wales.

== Business information ==
Australian Registry Investments was granted the right to operate the titling and registry operations of New South Wales in April 2017, under a 35-year concession which commenced on 1 July 2017. ARI is a consortium of First State Super, The Infrastructure Fund, the Royal Bank of Scotland (RBS) Pension Fund, and Utilities Trust of Australia (UTA) Registry Investments Trust, all of whom are represented on the Board of Directors.

The NSW Government continues to guarantee title under the Torrens Assurance Fund (TAF).

The Office of the Registrar General regulates NSW LRS as the operator of the NSW land titles registry under a regulator operator model. The Registrar General monitors NSW LRS's operation of the land titles registry in respect of defined service levels, KPIs and the security of the data.

NSW LRS was formerly known as New South Wales Land and Property Information (NSW LPI). The LPI was renamed to NSW Land Registry Services in December 2017.

In 2018, the NSW Land Registry Service collaborated with ChromaWay to test the feasibility of blockchain technology for land registration. The implementation of the blockchain technology is intended to enhance transparency and efficiency.
