= New South Wales Treasury =

Department of the New South Wales government

NSW Treasury

Department overview
- Formed: April 1824
- Jurisdiction: New South Wales
- Headquarters: 52 Martin Place, Sydney NSW 2000 Sydney
- Ministers responsible: The Hon. Daniel Mookhey MLC, Treasurer of New South Wales; The Hon. Courtney Houssos MLC, Minister for Finance; The Hon. Sophie Cotsis MP, Minister for Industrial Relations and Minister for Work Health and Safety
- Department executive: Michael Coutts-Trotter, Secretary
- Child agencies: Office of Financial Management; NSW Treasury Corporation; Electricity Tariff Equalisation Ministerial Corporation; FSS Trustee Corporation; Hardship Board of Review; Internal Audit Bureau of NSW; Liability Management Ministerial Corporation; NSW Self Insurance Corporation; SAS Trustee Corporation; Destination NSW; Western City and Aerotropolis Authority; NSW Small Business Commission; Jobs for NSW
- Website: www.treasury.nsw.gov.au

NSW Treasury is a department of the New South Wales Government, is responsible for state financial management policy and reporting, and providing advice to the government on economic conditions and issues in New South Wales, Australia. NSW Treasury was established in April 1824 and is the oldest continuing government agency in Australia.

== Core responsibilities ==
Management of NSW finances

- consistent collection and consolidation of financial information from public entities
- strong financial management through accurate data and advice
- effective delivery of the Budget and other financial reports, on behalf of the Treasurer.

Analysis, advice and delivery

- informed fiscal, economic, commercial and financial policy advice
- innovative reforms which support a strong and competitive economy
- providing fair and productive industrial relations and public sector wages policies
- robust risk management and governance frameworks.

Management of NSW assets

- value-creating commercial and financial transactions
- respected commercial, financial and service delivery reforms
- market-leading analysis and advice on private financing of public infrastructure
- managing, monitoring and advising on the efficiency and effectiveness of public sector commercial agencies.

Efficient management of NSW's cash resources is a key responsibility of Treasury. A policy & guidelines paper published by Treasury in 2010 ('TPP10–2 Treasury Banking System Cash Forecasting and Banking Arrangements') provided the state's agencies with relevant information in relation to cash forecasting requirements and banking arrangements. In 2015, the Expenditure Review Committee of the state's Cabinet directed that public sector agencies (excluding state-owned corporations and authorities specifically approved by the NSW Treasurer) would, from 1 April 2015, operate as part of the Treasury Banking System. This decision applied to all agency cash deposits held ‘at call’.

== Structure ==
The Treasury is led by its Secretary, Michael Coutts-Trotter who reports to the ministers listed below.

=== Ministers ===
The following ministers are responsible for administering the Treasury portfolio:

- Treasurer of New South Wales, currently The Honourable Daniel Mookhey MLC
- Minister for Finance and Minister for Domestic Manufacturing and Government Procurement, currently The Honourable Courtney Houssos MLC
- Minister for Industrial Relations and Minister for Work Health and Safety, currently The Honourable Sophie Cotsis MP

Ultimately, the Ministers are responsible to the Parliament of New South Wales.

=== Current structural groups ===
The Treasury is divided into six service groups that perform various functions on behalf of the department:

- Economic Strategy and Productivity Group
- Policy and Budget Group
- Commercial Group
- Financial Management and Services
- Office of the Secretary and Ministerial Services
- Office of the General Counsel

== Departmental head ==
Order	Agency head	Title	Term start	Term end	Term in office	Notes
1	Henry Lane	Under Secretary for Finance and Trade	1 September 1856	30 January 1872	19 years, 27 days	
2	Geoffrey Eagar	Under Secretary for Finance and Trade	1 February 1872	28 February 1891	19 years, 27 days	
3	Francis Kirkpatrick	Under Secretary for Finance and Trade	1 March 1891	10 May 1905	14 years, 70 days	
4	Charles James Saunders	Under Secretary for Finance and Trade	11 May 1905	28 January 1907	1 year, 262 days	
5	John William Holliman	Under Secretary for Finance and Trade	29 January 1907	15 January 1922	14 years, 351 days	
6	Arthur Pattrick Pearson	Under Secretary of The Treasury	16 January 1922	3 April 1923	1 year, 77 days	
7	John Spence	Under Secretary for Finance and Trade; Director of Finance	4 April 1923	21 November 1924	1 year, 231 days	
8	Sir Bertram Stevens	Director of Finance; Under Secretary and Director of The Treasury	22 November 1924	12 July 1925	232 days	
9	Clarence Radford Chapman	Under Secretary of The Treasury	13 July 1925	29 July 1935	10 years, 16 days	
10	Thomas Joseph Dwyer Kelly	Under Secretary and Comptroller of Accounts	30 July 1935	10 May 1938	2 years, 284 days	
11	Edmund Harold Swift	Under Secretary and Comptroller of Accounts	11 May 1938	5 January 1942	3 years, 239 days	
12	Mervyn Andrew Kerr Weir	Under Secretary and Comptroller of Accounts	19 January 1942	31 December 1945	3 years, 346 days	
13	John George Lee	Under Secretary and Comptroller of Accounts	2 January 1946	30 June 1948	2 years, 180 days	
14	Sir John Goodsell	Under Secretary and Comptroller of Accounts	1 July 1948	29 April 1955	6 years, 302 days	
15	Aubrey William Burleton Coady	Under Secretary and Comptroller of Accounts	30 April 1955	13 October 1959	4 years, 166 days	
16	William Gordon Mathieson	Under Secretary and Comptroller of Accounts	14 October 1959	26 December 1963	4 years, 73 days	
17	Edwin James Walder	Under Secretary and Comptroller of Accounts	27 December 1963	21 September 1965	1 year, 268 days	
18	Albert John Oliver	Under Secretary and Comptroller of Accounts	22 September 1965	30 June 1971	5 years, 281 days	
19	William Ernest Henry	Under Secretary and Comptroller of Accounts	1 July 1971	16 January 1977	5 years, 199 days	
20	Norman Oakes	Under Secretary and Comptroller of Accounts	17 January 1977	23 February 1986	9 years, 37 days	
21	Percy Allan	Secretary of The Treasury; Chairman of the NSW Treasury Corporation	24 February 1986	27 May 1994	8 years, 92 days	
22	Michael George Lambert	Secretary of The Treasury	1 June 1994	31 January 1997	2 years, 244 days	
23	John Pierce	Secretary of The Treasury	16 April 1997	2 March 2009	11 years, 320 days	
24	Michael Schur	Secretary of The Treasury	2 March 2009	28 April 2011	2 years, 57 days	
–	Michael Lambert (acting)	Secretary of The Treasury	28 April 2011	3 August 2011	97 days	
25	Phil Gaetjens	Secretary of The Treasury	3 August 2011	30 June 2015	3 years, 331 days	
26	Rob Whitfield	Secretary of The Treasury	1 July 2015	31 July 2017	2 years, 30 days	
27	Michael Pratt AM	Secretary of The Treasury	1 August 2017	28 January 2022	4 years, 180 days	
28	Paul Grimes PSM	Secretary of The Treasury	29 January 2022	14 April 2023	1 year, 75 days	
29	Michael Coutts-Trotter	Secretary of The Treasury	15 April 2023	incumbent	3 years, 193 days	
