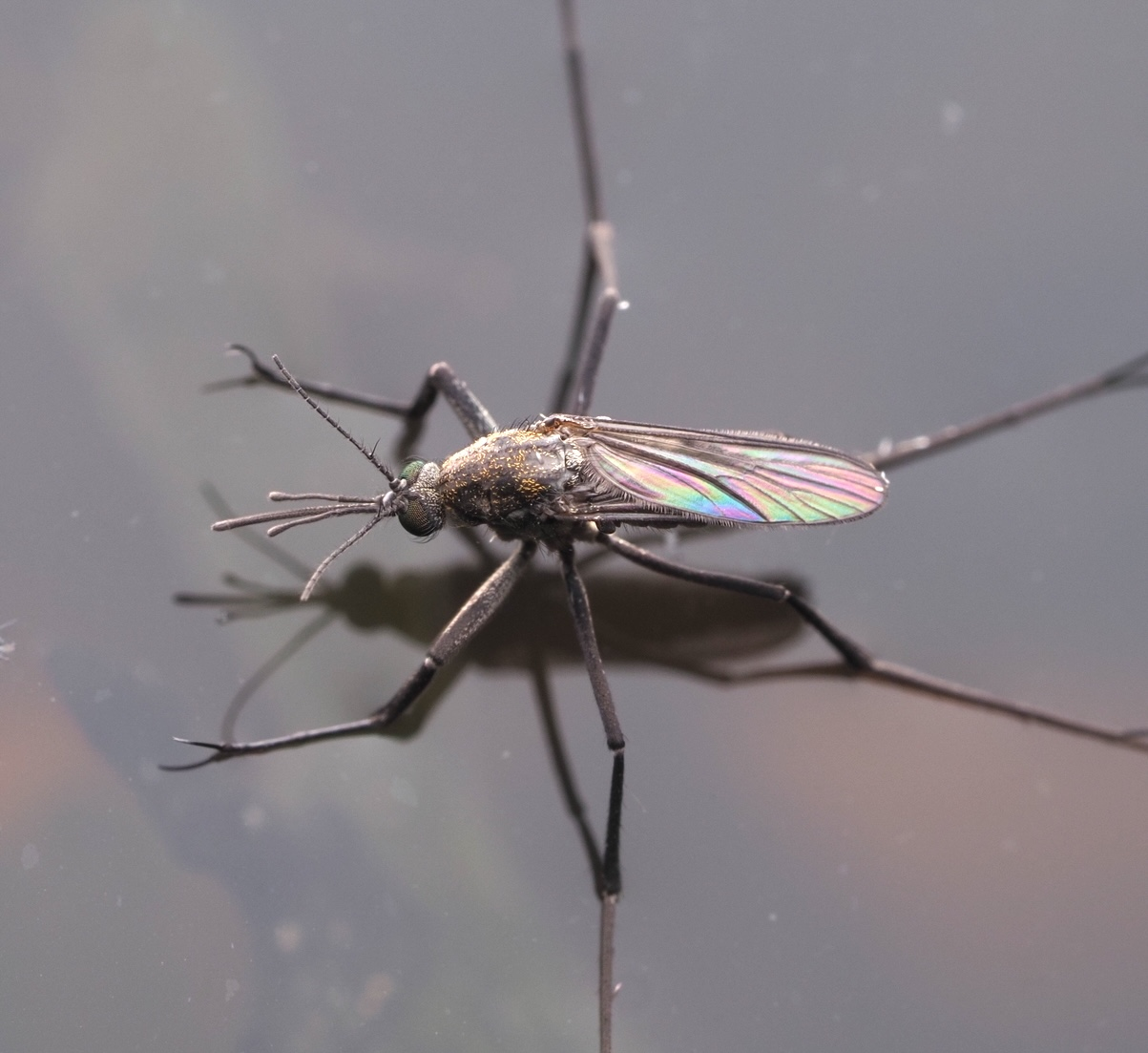
- Male Opifex fuscus

Scientific classification
- Kingdom: Animalia
- Phylum: Arthropoda
- Clade: Pancrustacea
- Class: Insecta
- Order: Diptera
- Family: Culicidae
- Tribe: Aedini
- Genus: Opifex
- Species: O. fuscus

Binomial name
- Opifex fuscus Hutton, 1902

= Opifex fuscus =

Species of mosquito

Opifex fuscus, commonly known as the saltpool mosquito, is a species of mosquito that is endemic to New Zealand. This species was first described in taxonomic literature in 1902 by Frederick Hutton. The mosquitoes occur on the coast, where the larvae live in rock pools within the spray zone.

To cope with their habitat, the larvae are able to tolerate a wide range of water salt concentrations. As adults they feed on blood whereas the larvae feed on algae and decomposing matter. The larvae have mouthparts that specialise towards either filter feeding or grazing, depending on what food source is available. They are widespread throughout the rocky coasts of New Zealand but have been displaced from the Otago region by the introduced species Aedes australis. The males wait on the surface of the rock pools and mate with female pupae before they mature into adults.

The larvae of this species are also known to be infected by the fungus Coelomomyces psorophorae, which uses copepods as intermediate hosts. In laboratory studies, O. fuscus is capable of spreading the Whataroa virus, but is not known to spread any diseases in nature. They are also known by the Māori name naeroa, which is generally applied to mosquitoes as a whole.

== Taxonomy ==
Opifex fuscus was first described in taxonomic literature in 1902 by Frederick Hutton from a specimen collected in Wellington by George Vernon Hudson. In Latin, fuscus means 'darkly coloured'. It is the type species of the genus Opifex, meaning it is the species on which Opifex is based. It was initially categorised as a crane fly, although Hutton noted it looked like a mosquito. Hutton did not specify a type specimen (the specimen on which the species description is based), so a specimen collected by Hudson was later assigned as the type specimen, termed a lectotype, by another researcher. This type specimen is stored in the Canterbury Museum in Christchurch.

In 1921, David Miller stated that Hudson had informed him O. fuscus was in fact a mosquito, rather than a crane fly. In the same year, Frederick Edwards examined specimens presented to the Natural History Museum of London by Hudson and confirmed that the species was in fact a mosquito and that it belonged in the subfamily Culicinae. In 1922, Miller followed up with a revision of the species and designated it as its own subfamily, the Opificinae. Just two years later, however, this subfamily was recognised to the be the same as Culicinae by Edwards. The species last had a major revision in 1968, in which the mosquito was described in greater detail and assigned to the Aedini group on the basis of its more primitive characteristics. It is commonly referred to as the "saltpool mosquito". The Māori word naeroa refers to mosquitoes, which includes Opifex fuscus.

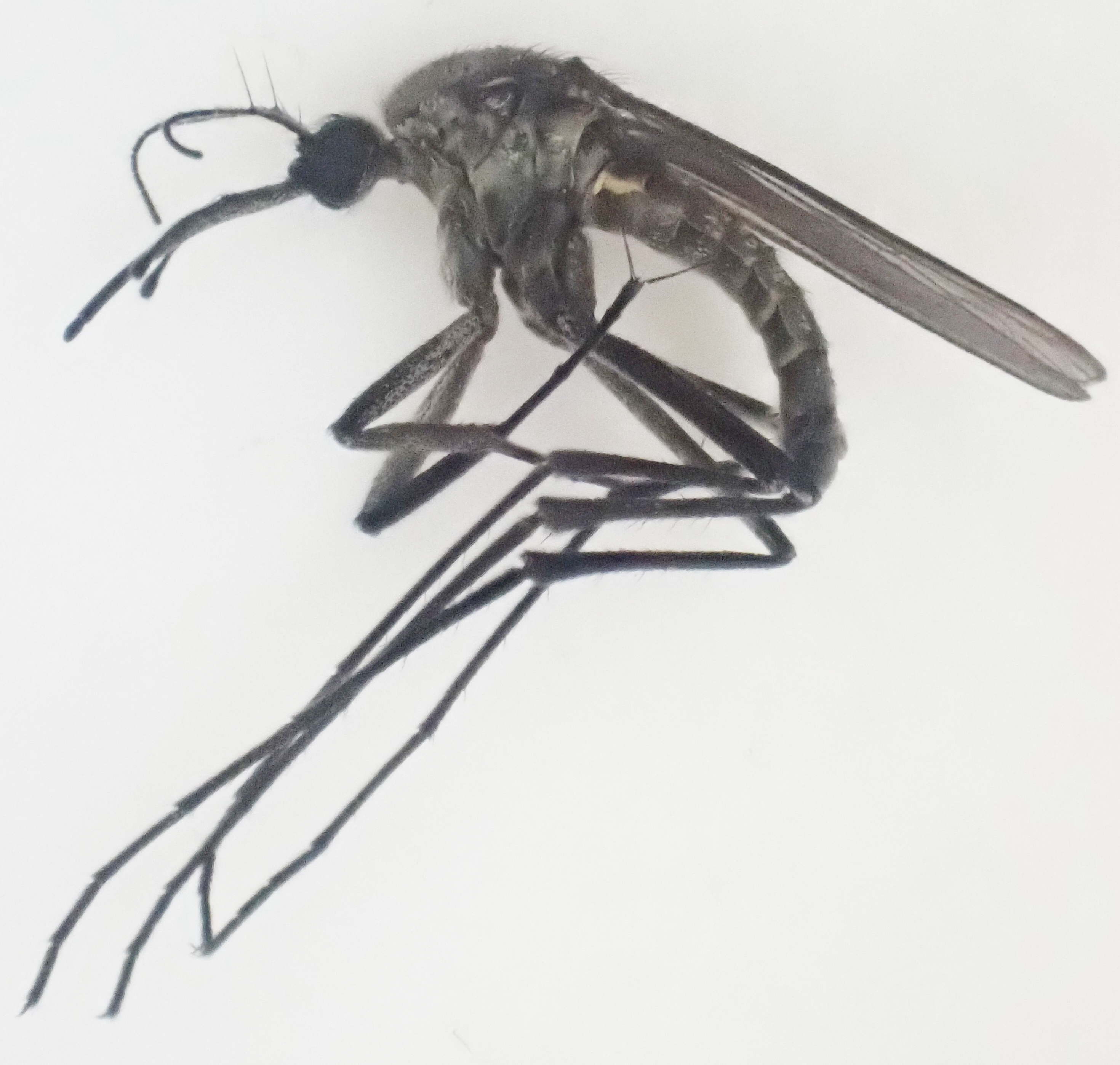
Adult

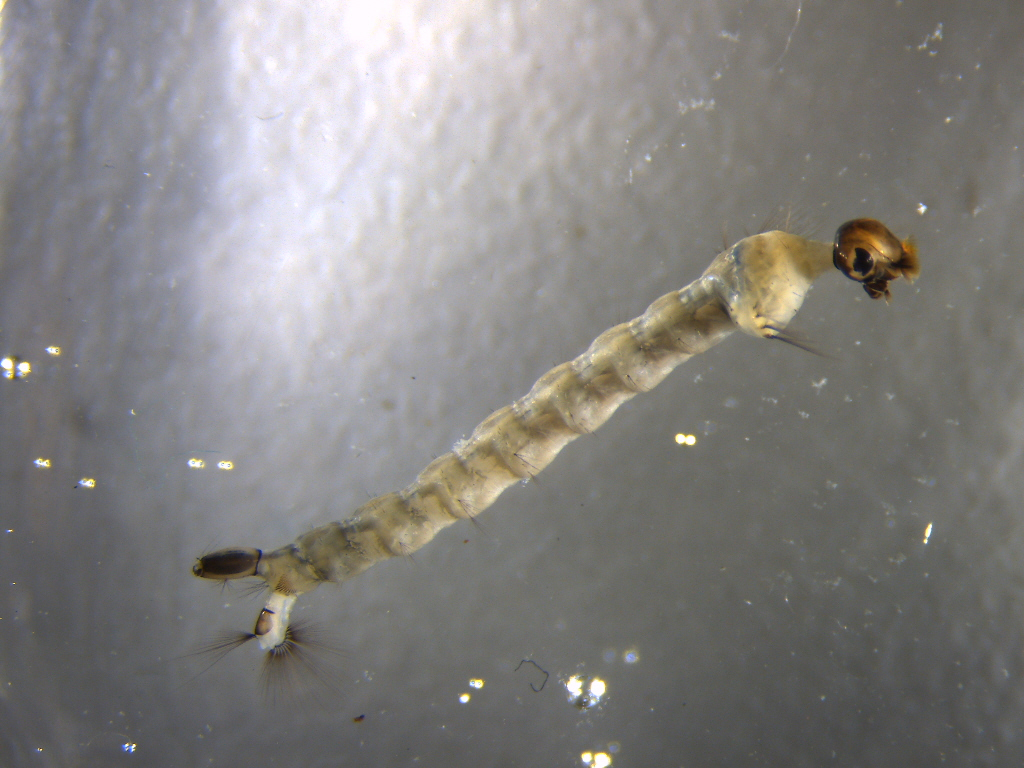
Larva

== Description ==
As adults, they can be distinguished from the rest of New Zealand's mosquitoes by the presence and absence of certain bristles on the abdomen, the shape of the antennae and the absence of scales on the upper surface of the head.

The adults are stocky, generally greyish in colour and are roughly 5 mm (0.2 in) in length. The antennae are blackish and have three long bristles near their base. The upper surface of the head does not have scales that stick out. Like many other mosquitoes, they have a long proboscis, a straw-like mouthpart for sucking blood. The legs are brownish black, with the first pair of legs in the male having very long claws. The thorax, the middle section of the body, is blackish and is coated with gold and black hairs on top. The abdomen is a black brown colour and is covered in blackish bristles and whitish scales. Due to the water-repellent body hairs, the mosquito can tolerate being doused in water. In flight, they make a slight buzzing sound.

=== Pupa ===
The thorax of the pupae, the juvenile stage where the mosquitoes are in a cocoon-like structure, has a ridge that is divided by a groove-like depression, which is used in mating. The appendages used in respiration are near the middle of the thorax and have spines on the upper surface. The segments of the abdomen are visible and well defined. Abdominal segments one to six have long spines on their upper surfaces.

=== Larva ===
The different instars, or phases between moults, of the larvae can be distinguished by the size of the head capsule. In their final instar before pupating, the larvae are about 12.5 mm (0.49 in) in length. They are coloured blackish brown but are sometimes also greenish. Near the tip of abdomen there is a structure termed the siphon, which is a straw-like organ used for breathing air and has a small pair of hair tufts just above the middle. This structure splits off making it appear like the abdomen divides in half at the tip. The abdomen ends with a segment referred to as the anal segment. On this segment there is the anal plate, a platelike structure that occupies most of the segment, and a series of conspicuous tufts of hair. The head has brownish maxillae (mouthparts). The head also has mouth brushes that come in two forms, with each larva only having one type. In the first form, the brushes have simple hairs whereas in the second, the hairs are pectinate, having small branches protruding off them. A scanning electron microscope study found all brushes bear pectinate hairs to some degree, indicating a continuum rather than a strict dichotomy. The thorax is slightly wider than the head and has a distinctive pattern of small hairs. There are tufts of hair on the segments of the abdomen, with longer tufts at the beginning of the abdomen.

=== Egg ===
The eggs' dimensions are 0.3 mm by 0.5 mm (0.01 by 0.02 in) and they are ovoid in shape. They are brownish to blackish in colour but are somewhat transparent. The underside of the egg is flattened. Sections of the egg have protuberances that stick to surfaces.

== Distribution and habitat ==
This species is only found in New Zealand and occurs throughout the rocky coastline of the entire North Island and most of the South Island. In the south east of the South Island, they co-occur with Aedes australis, an exotic species which also utilises rock pools. It has been suggested that A. australis competes with O. fuscus and has displaced it in this region. The distribution of O. fuscus also includes nearby small islands such as the Three Kings Islands, the Mokohinau Islands and White Island. In addition, populations have been recorded in the much further away Kermadec Islands and the subantarctic Snares Islands.

=== Habitat ===
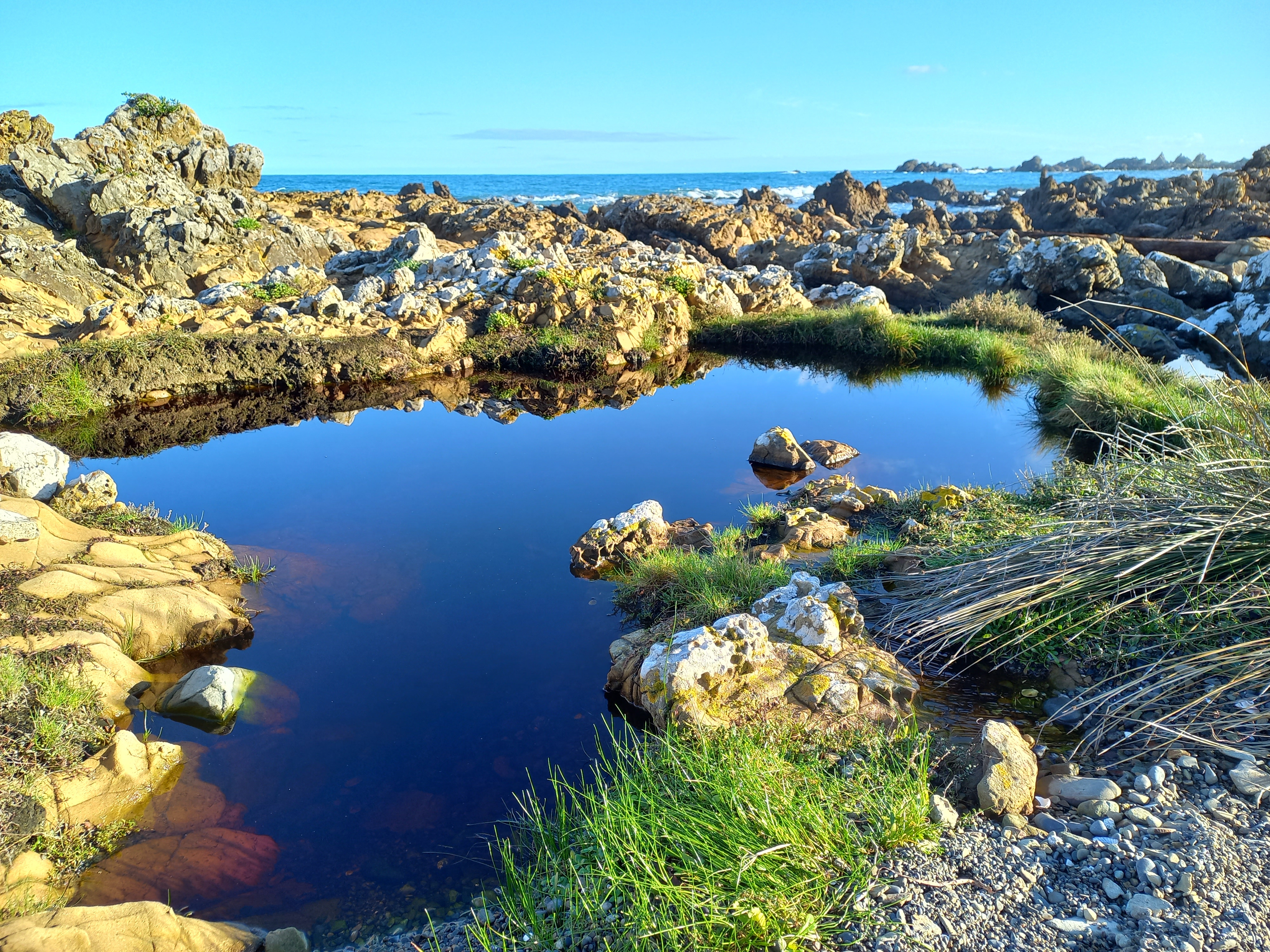
Typical salt pool habitat of Opifex fuscus

The salt pool mosquitoes occur in rocky coastal habitat. The larvae are found in rock pools that occur within the spray zone above the high tide of the coast. Due to the water evaporating and leaving behind salt, these pools tend to develop high salt concentrations. The larvae occur in both permanent and temporary rock pools which are refreshed by rain and spray from the ocean. They have also been recorded from pools in freshwater streams and from a horse water trough, although these are not typical examples.

The larvae tolerate a wide range of salinities. In the field, pools containing larvae have been recorded up to ~9% (≈2.6× normal seawater of ~3.5%) and down to ~0.40%. In laboratory work, third and fourth-instar larvae withstood step increases to 7%, with occasional individuals to 10.5%, and in an evaporation trial moulting and pupation ceased by ~13%. The remaining larvae died by ~16.5%. Another study reported a single larva surviving in 1.25× seawater. In one study, the permeability of the cuticle was much lower than that of mosquitoes that live in freshwater. It was suggested that this is an adaptation for surviving the high salinity of salt pools. The adults are also frequently observed on or near rock pools occupied by larvae, with the males commonly seen floating on the surface of the pools. Within the salt pools that they occupy, the copepod Tigriopus fulvus, a small crustacean, is often present.

== Diet ==
Adult females of this species feed on the blood of birds and humans. They will feed by day and night but are most active during the day. Unlike other mosquito species, the female generally does not require a blood meal to produce their first batch of eggs due to their large energy reserves from their larval stage. After producing their first eggs, they will begin feeding on blood. However, this was contradicted by one study, in which females were only able to lay eggs after feeding on sugar water. This may indicate that if they have insufficient energy reserves (such as when they receive little food as larvae), they may need to feed before laying eggs. In lab conditions, the females would spend 5 to 12 minutes feeding on human blood.

Based on gut contents, the larvae feed primarily on various algae and decomposing matter. As the larvae get bigger, they feed on larger food particles. However, they are also reported to occasionally cannibalise injured mosquito larvae when food is scarce. By the time they emerge as adults, they have unusually high levels of fat when compared to other mosquitoes.

The type of mouth brush that the larvae possess appears to be determined by the type of food available. In one study, larvae reared on fish food developed pectinate brushes, whereas those reared on blood serum only had simple brushes. It appears that simple brushes are best suited for filter feeding, whereas the pectinate brush are best suited for grazing.

== Life history ==
Females use their ovipositor (pointed structure that deposits eggs) to lay their eggs on the damp edges of rock pools, which can extend up to 5 cm (2 in) from the water's surface. Typically, the eggs are laid inside cracks and crevices, but other coastal debris may also be utilised when there are limited egg-laying spots available. When at a suitable site, the female tucks its abdomen under its thorax and lays six to ten eggs. Because the rock pools fluctuate in water levels and may even be temporary, it is risky for larvae to hatch at the wrong time. To prevent this, they hatch when the water level is high, detected by changes in oxygen levels, and can potentially delay hatching for months if the conditions are not suitable. Upon hatching, the larvae leave the egg shell head first. In lab conditions, the females have been recorded laying up to 100 eggs, but around 30 eggs laid was more typical. Egg laying begins in just under two weeks from emergence.

The larvae have four instar stages to pass through before pupating. The rate at which the larvae grow can be quite variable. In one study (in lab conditions), it was found that it took larvae 10 to 30 days to reach the pupal stage. The growth rate depends heavily on environmental factors such as temperature and light exposure. In laboratory conditions, larvae grown at 25 °C (77 °F) matured faster than larvae at 13 °C (55 °F). The final instar before pupating takes the longest amount of time and is also the largest increase in biomass.

Once in the pupae stage they do not feed. Few larvae pupate during the winter months (June to August), with September being the time of year when pupae were most abundant in one study. As in the larval stage, the pupation stage varies in length and appears to be dependent on the environment. It has been recorded taking as little as 72 hours and as long as 12 days. The females are recorded emerging into adults within five to thirty minutes after capture for mating by the male. In the North Island, adults can be found all year. However, in the South Island, the adults are apparently absent during winter.

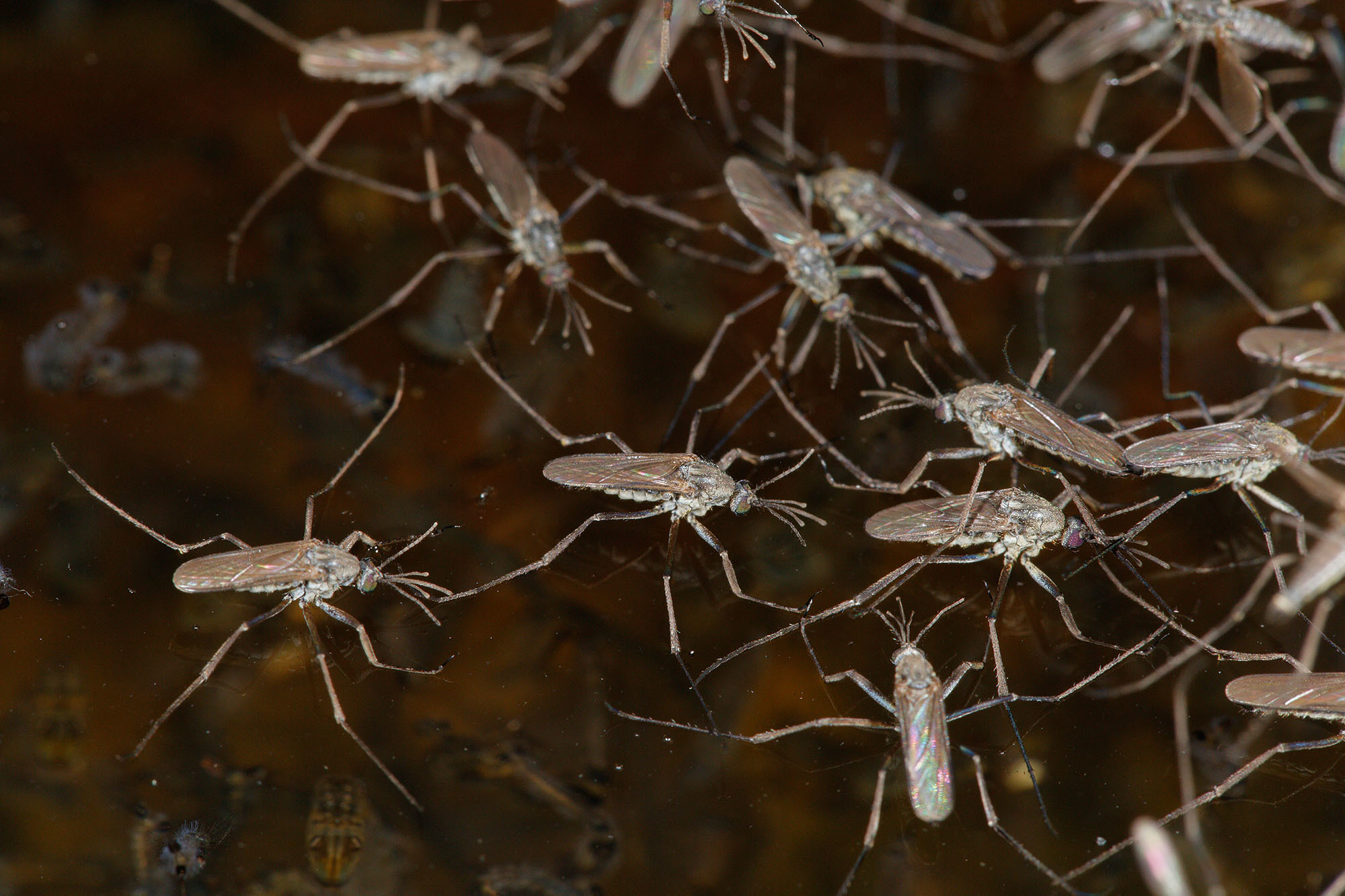
Males congregating on the surface of a pool

=== Mating ===
Opifex fuscus has an unusual mating system when compared to other mosquitoes. Females mate extremely early, usually at the time of emergence. Before newly emerged males can begin mating, they must rotate their terminalia (the terminal segments of the abdomen, which are modified into external genitalia) to at least 135 degrees, which may take up to five hours—unusually quick for mosquitoes. The males typically begin looking for females around 6 to 24 hours after emerging.

The males wait on the surface of saltwater pools that contain larvae of their species. Once a larva pupates it will float to the surface. The male will then grab the pupae using its front legs with claws that are modified to be extremely long. The males can detect the pupae by eyesight and possibly vibrations caused by the pupae reaching the surface. When the male is in contact with a pupa, it submerges its head underwater, which is covered in hydrophobic hairs to protect it. The male then bends its abdomen to the pupa and inserts its terminalia into a groove in the pupae. Once the terminalia is locked into place with the groove, the male lets go of its front legs. Around ten to twenty minutes later, the pupa begins to emerge into an adult. The male will slot its abdomen into the pupal case to assist with emergence, which takes up to five minutes. If the emerging mosquito is female, then the male will come into contact with its terminalia and transfer spermatozoa, often before it has even left its pupal case. If the adult emerging from the pupa is male, then it will disengage and attempt to find another pupa, often within a few seconds of capture. It is very rare for these mosquitoes to emerge without the assistance of males, although it is possible.

One potential cause for this mating system is that the females apparently only need to mate once, whilst males will mate many times. Because of this, there is strong competition among males for mating. The selective pressure from this competition may have caused the evolution of the early mating system in this species. There is evidence that larger males tend to be able to mate with more females than smaller males do, which suggests that mating for this species is non-random. This pupal mating system is extremely rare, but the mosquito Deinocerites cancer has a similar system.

== Parasites ==
The larvae can be infected by Coelomomyces psorophorae, a parasitic fungus that completes an earlier part of its life cycle inside small aquatic crustaceans called copepods before infecting mosquito larvae. It was first discovered infecting Opifex fuscus larvae in Otago. The fungus also infects Aedes australis, which co-occurs with O. fuscus in some parts of New Zealand. The fungus is far more effective at infecting the former. In O. fuscus, the natural infection rates have been found to be as high as 47.3%.

== Disease transmission ==
Opifex fuscus has not been recorded transmitting diseases in the wild. However, in laboratory conditions it has successfully acted as a host of the Whataroa virus, New Zealand's only mosquito-borne virus. In another study, it was found that O. fuscus could act as a disease vector for some other alphaviruses.
