= Solanum karsense =

Scientific classification
- Kingdom: Plantae
- Clade: Embryophytes
- Clade: Tracheophytes
- Clade: Spermatophytes
- Clade: Angiosperms
- Clade: Eudicots
- Clade: Asterids
- Order: Solanales
- Family: Solanaceae
- Genus: Solanum
- Species: S. karsense

Binomial name
- Solanum karsense Symon

Species of flowering plant

Solanum karsense, the Menindee nightshade, is a member of the family Solanaceae, and is listed as a vulnerable species under both the NSW Biodiversity Conservation Act and the Commonwealth Environment Protection and Biodiversity Conservation Act.

== Description ==
Solanum karsense is a green-grey perennial herb that can grow up to approximately 30 cm (12 in) tall. The entire plant is densely covered in pale star shaped hairs with firm pale spines up to 15 mm (0.6 in) long along the stem. Leaves are rounded and ovate, 1.5 to 3 cm (0.6 to 1.2 in) long and 1 to 2 cm (0.4 to 0.8 in) wide. Flowers are purple, shallowly bell shaped being about 20 to 35 mm (0.8 to 1.4 in) across and occur in clusters up to 12. The fruit is a small berry, white with green stripes.

== Distribution and habitat ==
Solanum karsense is found in far south-western New South Wales, Australia. The species' range is known to extend as far south as Balranald along the Murray River, and as far north as Manindee, as far west as the South Australian border, and its eastern most sighting is nearby the Lachlan Valley State Conservation Area. Kinchega National Park is the only conservation reserve in which the species is protected.

The species preferred habitat is periodically flooded lake beds and floodplains, with heavy self-mulching grey clay soils, and is often associated with Black Box (Eucalyptus largiflorens) and Old Man Saltbush (Atriplex nummularia). However, the species also occurs on sandy floodplains, ridges and red brown earths.

== Ecology and life cycle ==
Solanum karsense is ephemeral and clonal, appearing in flushes following flooding or significant rainfall. During flooding seeds persist in the soil, once the soil dries out and begins to crack seedlings emerge and take approximately 3 to 6 months to mature, flower, and set seed, replenishing the seed bank. Populations then decline until the next flood or rain event. Individuals can also reproduce through runners shooting up from lateral roots. It has been known to tolerate or even be stimulated by human disturbances like ploughing, grading, and cultivation. Populations can range from isolated individuals to large colonies covering thousands of hectares.

== Threats ==
Key threats to the species include habitat modification through lake bed cropping; the altering of flooding regimes, both permanent inundation of formally ephemeral lakes, and the disruption of natural flooding cycles; and grazing pressure from livestock, rabbits, kangaroos, and goats.

== Conservation management and research ==
Solanum karsense is an extremely under researched species with many knowledge gaps such as the species range, population hotspots, and seed viability and germination, as well as the effects of fire, flooding, grazing, and other disturbances on the species. The species is covered under NSW's Saving Our Species program but has no active conservation programs as of June 2026, however one is stated to be in the works.
