= Opifex =

Opifex is a Latin word meaning artisan or manufacturer and refers to a worker who created something. The word is derived from the Latin words opus ("work" or "thing") and facio ("to make"); the plural is opifices.

The word is also used as the name for the genus Opifex in the mosquito subfamily and in the binomial name of the species Phidippus opifex

Opifex is used in Latin for Saint Joseph the Worker, Sanctus Josephus Opifex, who is celebrated in the Roman Catholic Church on May 1.

Additionally, the German alchemist Cornelius Agrippa used the word in the Third Book of his Occult Philosophy to refer to God.

Andrew Marvell uses the phrase "opifex horti" in his neo-Latin poem "Hortus" (l. 49) to refer to the gardener.
