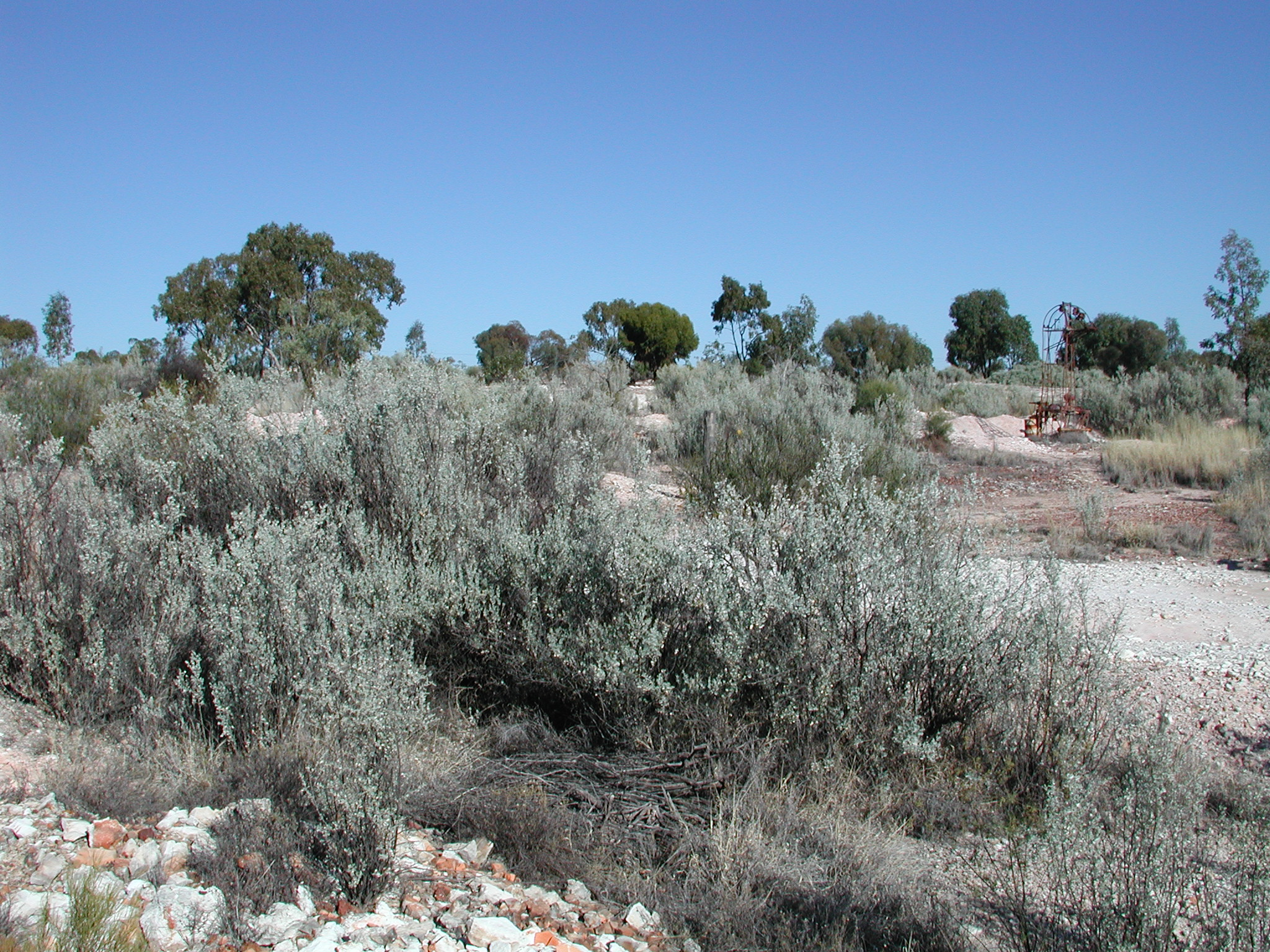

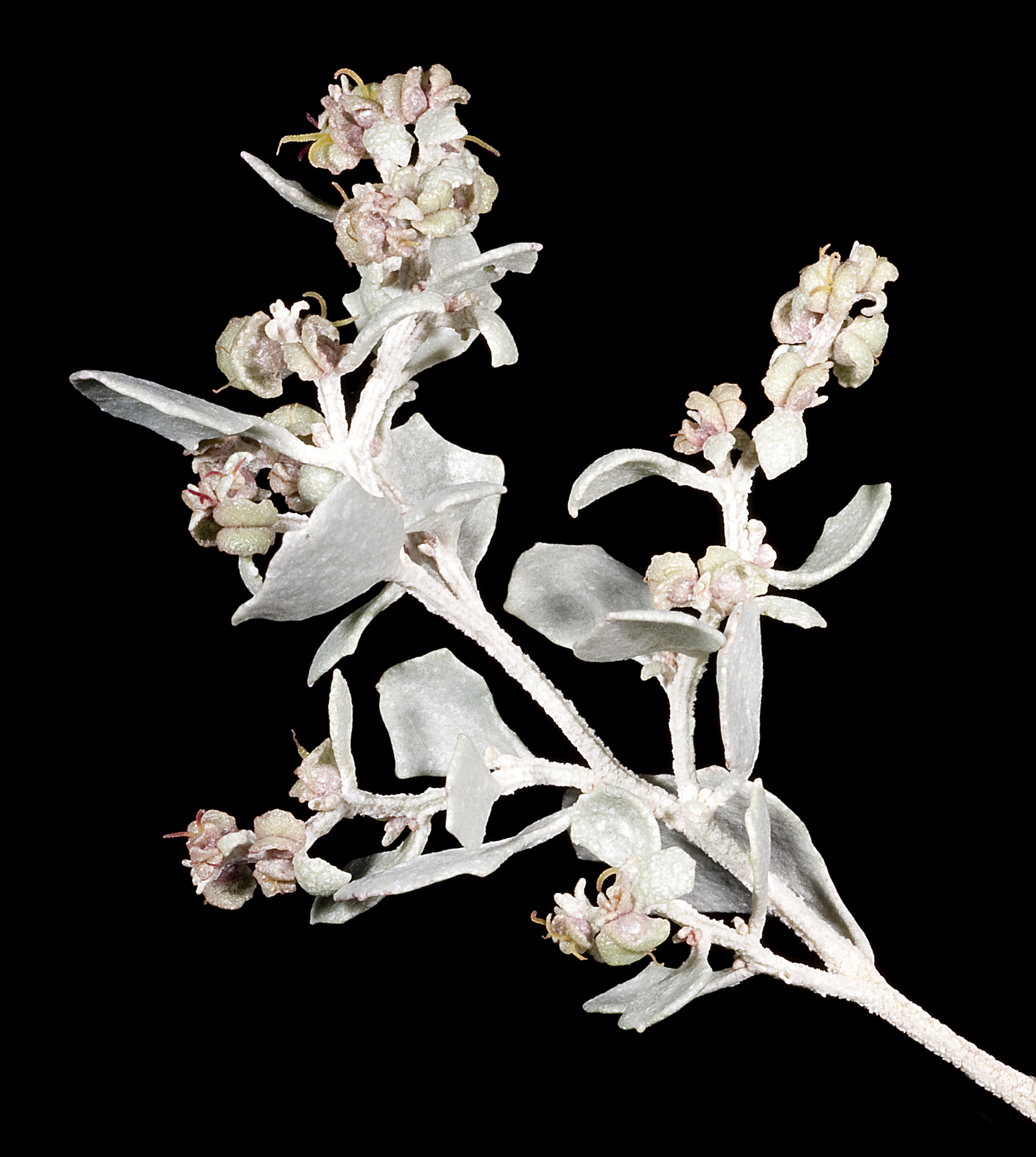

Scientific classification
- Kingdom: Plantae
- Clade: Tracheophytes
- Clade: Angiosperms
- Clade: Eudicots
- Order: Caryophyllales
- Family: Amaranthaceae
- Genus: Atriplex
- Species: A. nummularia

Binomial name
- Atriplex nummularia Lindl.
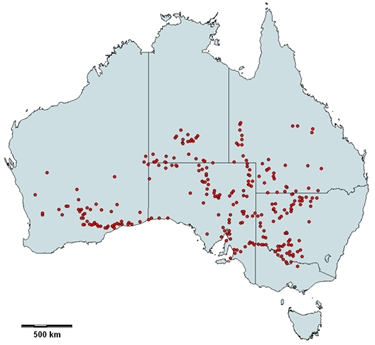
- Occurrence data ALA

Synonyms
- Atriplex johnstoni

= Atriplex nummularia =

Oldman saltbush

Species of plant

Atriplex nummularia is a species of saltbush from the family Amaranthaceae and is a large woody shrub known commonly as oldman saltbush. A. nummularia is native to Australia and occurs in each of the mainland states, thriving in arid and semi-arid inland regions.

== Description ==
Atriplex nummularia is a perennial halophyte species that is extremely hardy, thriving in particularly harsh environments such as saline and alkaline lowlands. A. nummularia is the largest species of Australian saltbush, typically growing 2–4m wide and up to 3m tall in either a sprawling or erect arrangement.

It develops a lattice of woody stems which branch from or close to ground level and utilises a taproot with a subsequent root system that is moderate to deep. It is an evergreen plant, with simple alternate leaves that often have dull teeth and are irregular in shape, varying between circular and triangular. The leaves range between 1–5 cm long and have a silvery-grey coating on both sides with a scaly texture.

Although hermaphroditic variations with bisexual flowers have been reported this species is generally regarded as dioecious, with male and female flowers occurring on separate plants. The male flowers are at the ends of branches in disjunct beads, whereas the female flowers grow along panicles in dense clusters typically around 20 cm in length. After the female flower has been fertilised, leafy bracts become enlarged and surround the developing seed.

The seeds themselves are typically round with a thick, woody seed coat and an overall reddish-brown appearance. Attached only at the base, the fruiting bracteoles are fan shaped and generally grow between 0.5–1 cm wide.

== Taxonomy and naming ==
Atriplex nummularia was first described as a species by John Lindley in 1848. It belongs to the genus Atriplex which comprises 298–377 species commonly referred to as a saltbush. A. nummularia is originally from the family Chenopodioideae which contains approximately 165 genera and 2040 species. More recently, this was included in Amaranthaceae (sensu lato). through the introduction of the APG II system in 2003.

The genus name Atriplex is a Latin word meaning "saltbush" and the specific epithet (nummularia) is derived from the Latin word nummus meaning "coin", referring to the circular shape of the leaves.

Its Noongar names are purngep, pining, and binga.

== Distribution and habitat ==
Originally a native Australian plant, Atriplex nummularia naturally occurs New South Wales, the Northern Territory, Queensland, South Australia, Victoria and Western Australia. It usually occurs on saline, low-lying clay soils such as floodplains, but is highly adaptable and can occur in most soils.

Atriplex nummularia also thrives in temperate and sub-tropical regions of the world, occurring throughout Taiwan and many parts of Oceania. It has also been introduced to most Middle-Eastern and North African countries, as well as South Africa, Mexico, Chile, Spain and the USA. A. nummularia is typically found in lowland areas such as floodplains in both the Northern and Southern hemispheres, favouring saline clay soils.

== Behavioural ==
The name saltbush fittingly describes a function of the species in which they retain salt in their leaves absorbed with water through osmosis. Optimal growth is achieved in places where the mean annual temperature is between 15–24 °C and where rainfall is between 230–650mm per annum, though conditions outside this range may be tolerated once the plant has become well established. Where it has been introduced to the South West of the United StatesA. nummularia primarily grows on alluvial or limestone soils and while extremely tolerant of both saline and alkaline conditions, it does not cope in an acidic environment. The species is able to grow in soils ranging from clays to sand, but is best suited to well-drained soils that have a deep profile.

Though a saline environment deters most pests A. nummularia is not totally immune. The lucerne flea (Sminthurus viridis) and red-legged earth mite(Halotydeus destructor) are the most common and can infest the plant, causing significant damage that results in the malformation of new growth. It may also become sporadically attacked by a native saltbush scale, usually managed naturally through environmental processes. A. nummularia is often used as a food source for the larvae of some species including Lepidoptera and provide a habitat for arthropods including arachnids such as Phidippus californicus.

== Reproduction and dispersal ==
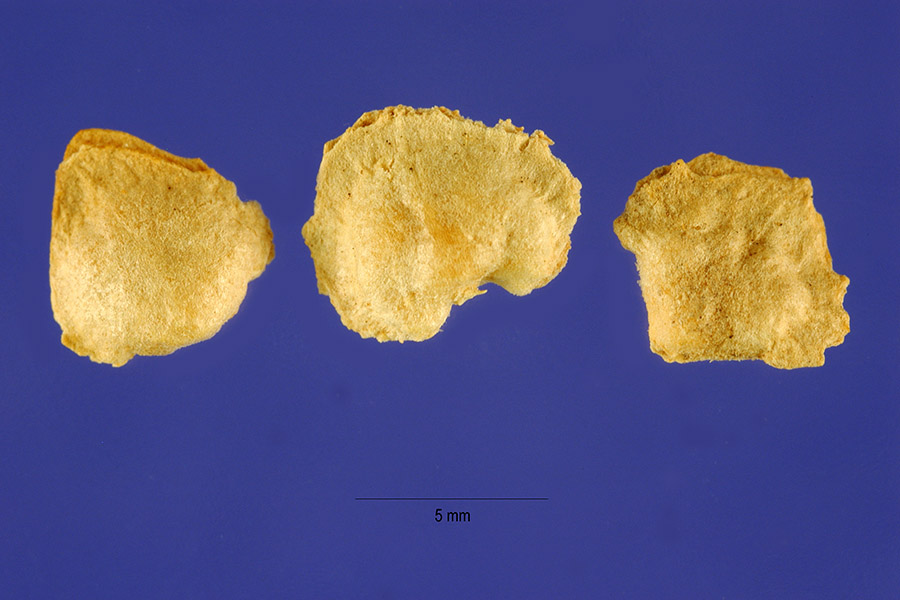
A. nummularia seeds

Atriplex nummularia generally produces small wind-pollinated flowers throughout the winter months (June–August), although this may vary according to seasonal temperature fluctuations. Seed production is often subject to immense variation with saltbush fruit commonly containing no seeds. The seeds that do develop typically mature during the months of spring (September–November).

== Uses ==
Atriplex nummularia is among the most commonly utilised forage shrubs in Australia and has become widely cultivated for stock fodder. This is primarily a result of its propensity to survive in harsh environments subject to flooding, drought and high levels of salinity, as well as being palatable to livestock due to the elevated mineral content of the plant.

The seeds from the plant are a traditional food source for many Australian Aboriginal communities, both consuming them on their own and as a component of meals. A. nummularia is also used as a windbreak, stock shade, crop shelter-belt, screen or hedge, firebreak, erosion control and soil binder particularly for stabilising sand dunes as well as rehabilitating eroded or scorched soils.

Grubs found in the roots were eaten either raw or roasted by Noongar people, and the leaves and roots were mashed and boiled with water, to bathe skin sores wounds and burns, while early settlers reportedly drank the same decoction to treat scurvy.

== Conservation actions ==
Atriplex nummularia occurs in several protected areas, including the following in New South Wales:

- Kinchega National Park
- Mungo National Park
- Murrumbidgee Valley National Park
- Mutawintji National Park
- Paroo-Darling National Park
- Sturt National Park
- Yanga National Park

== Gallery ==
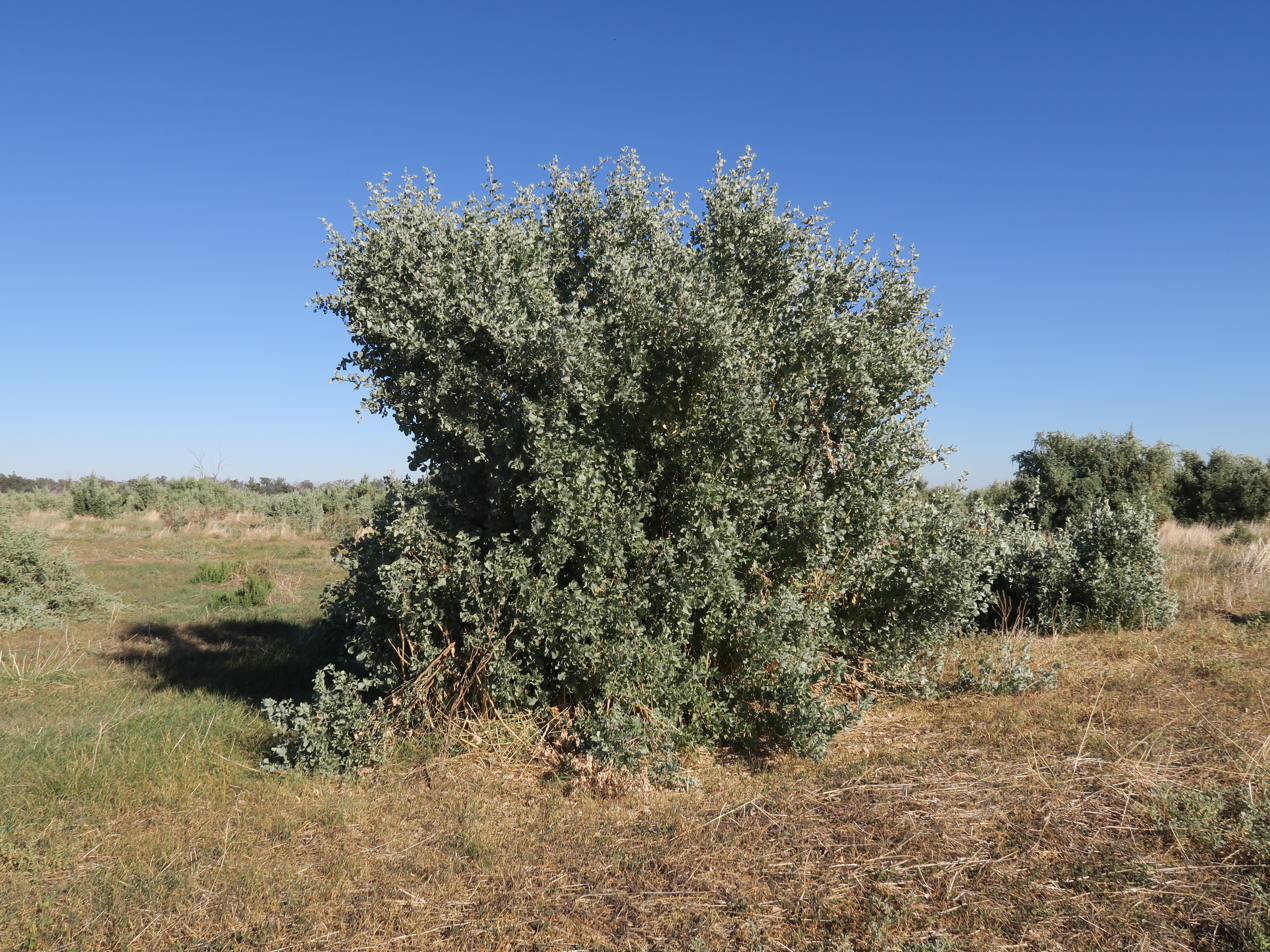
A. nummularia - Large shrub

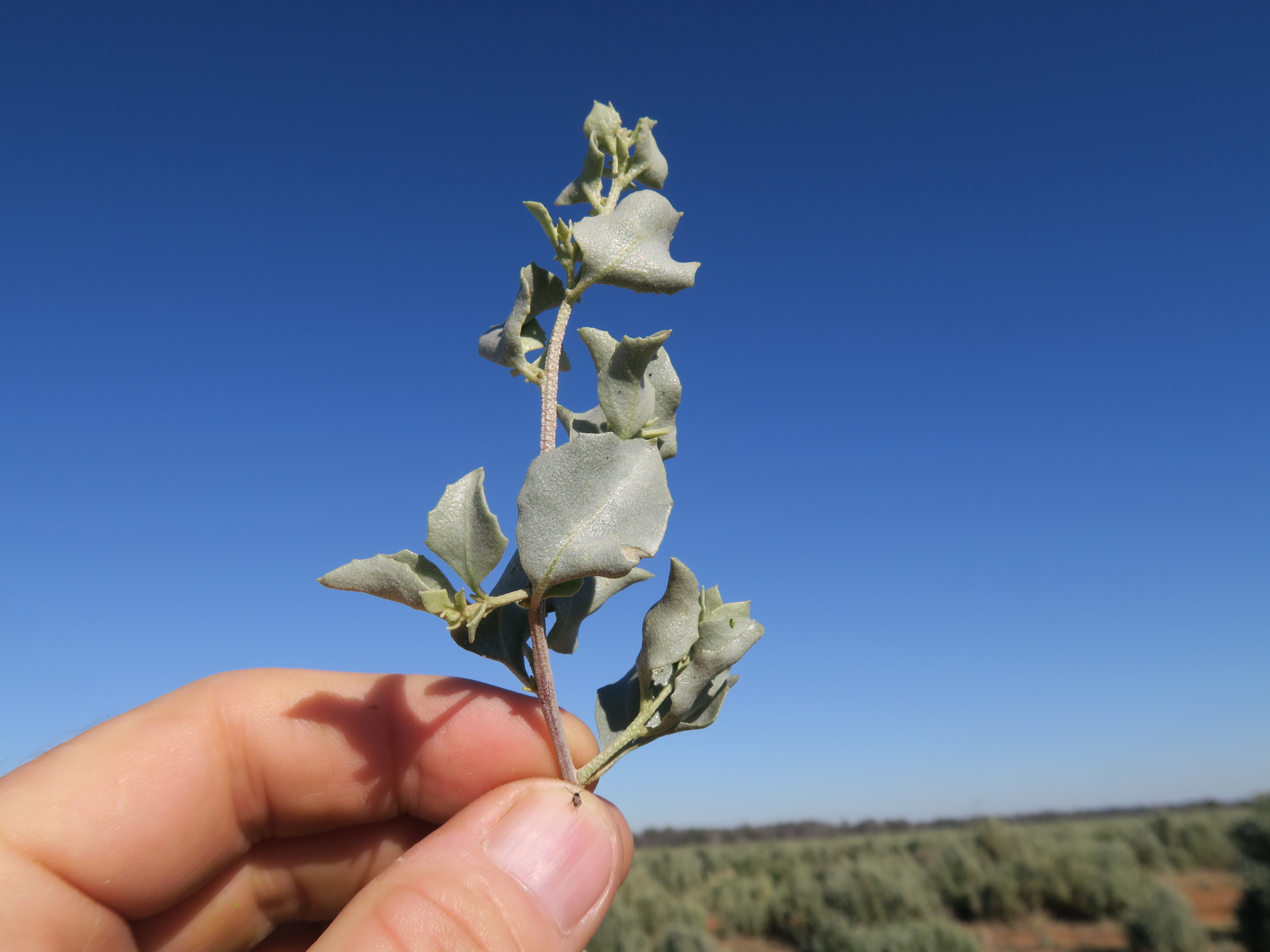
A. nummularia - Stem and leaf segment

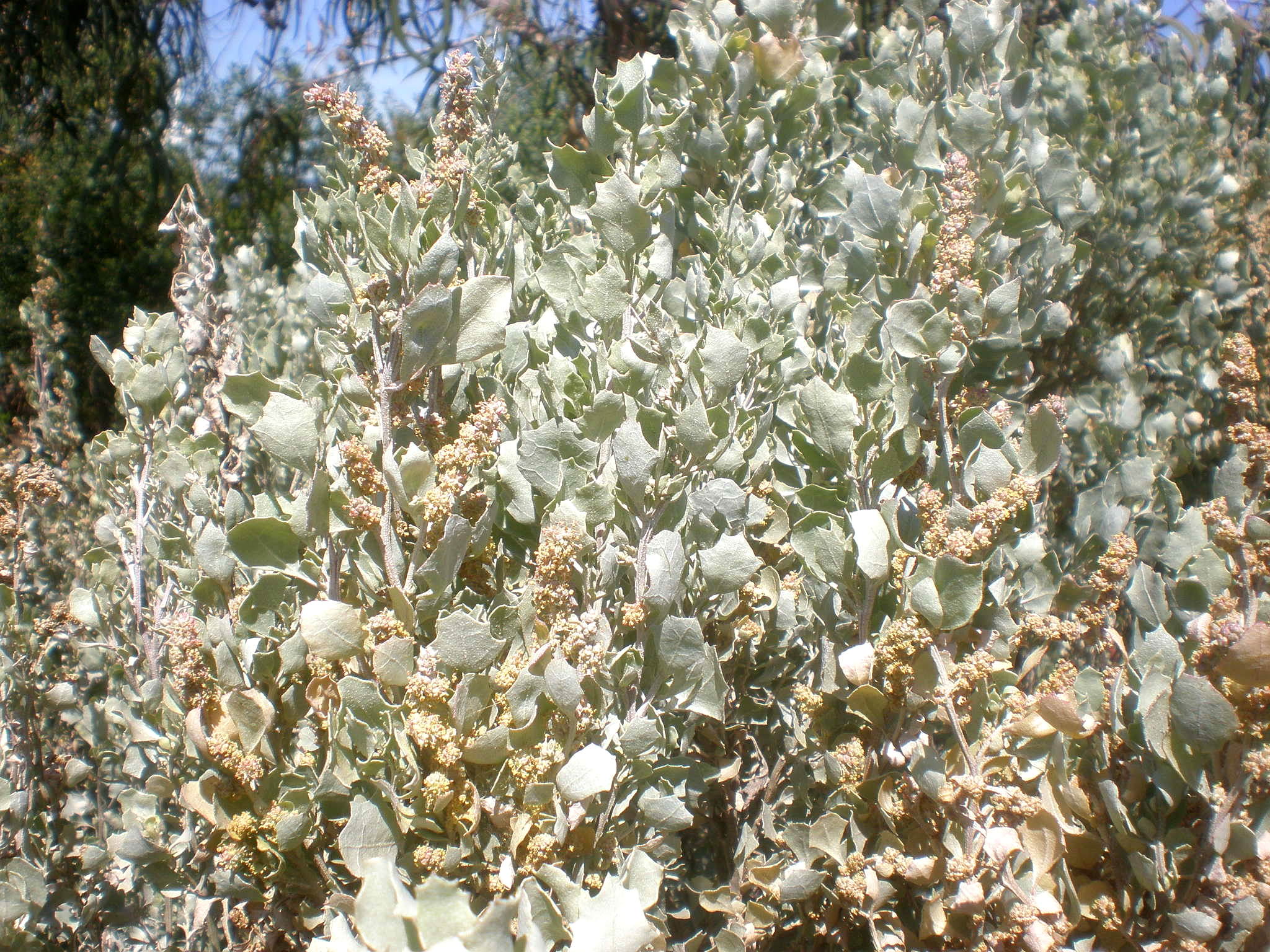
A. nummularia - Fruit and flowers
