= Kinchega Woolshed =

Heritage-listed former shearing shed in NSW, Australia

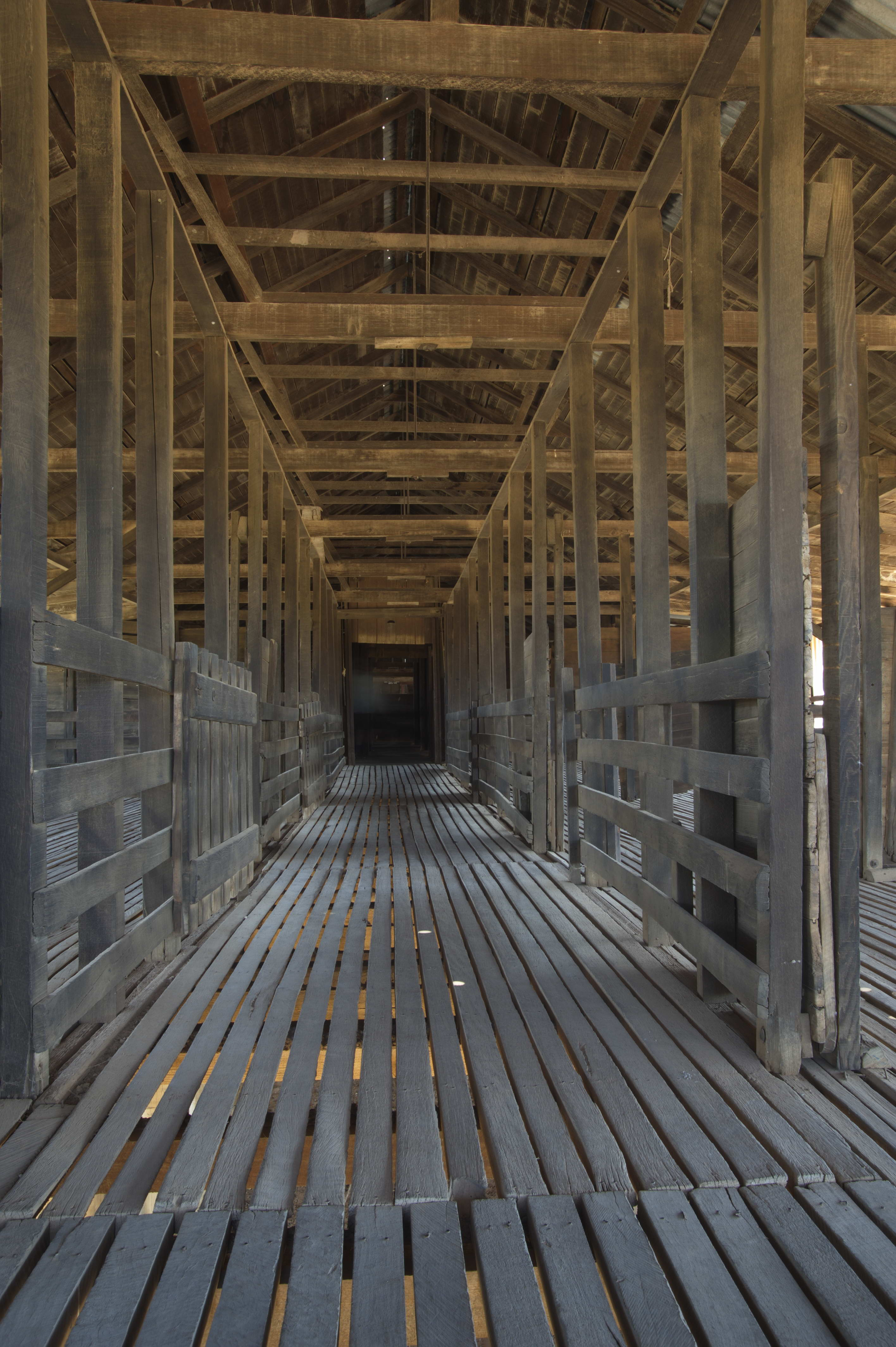

- Location within New South Wales Location within Australia
- 32.4754°S 142.3432°E
- Location: 15km south-west of, Menindee, Central Darling Shire, New South Wales, Australia

History
- Built: 1875–1875

Site notes
- Owner: Office of Environment and Heritage

New South Wales Heritage Register
- Official name: Kinchega Woolshed
- Type: state heritage (built)
- Designated: 2 April 1999
- Reference no.: 995
- Type: Woolshed/Shearing Shed
- Category: Farming and Grazing

Kinchega Woolshed is a heritage-listed former shearing shed located 15 km south-west of Menindee township, Central Darling Shire, New South Wales, Australia. It was built from in 1875. The property is owned by the New South Wales Office of Environment and Heritage. It was added to the New South Wales State Heritage Register on 2 April 1999.

== History ==
Originally an early West Darling property named "Menindel", it was first held by the explorer John McKinlay in the 1850s. By 1860 it was taken up by Peter McGregor and it had become known as "Kinchega". Burke and Wills visited it in 1860 and Kinchega's manager, William Wright, accompanied them as third in command and was blamed almost entirely for the tragedy that befell the expedition after he failed to meet the party on its return to Cooper's Creek.

In 1870 the station was sold by George Urquhart to Herbert Bristow Hughes. Hughes had two river steamers built in England to service the station named the "Jandra" and the "Nile". Steam engines were installed in 1875, by which year "Kinchega" was running 75,000 sheep and its boundary extended beyond the southern end of the Barrier Ranges. It is during this period that the present shed came into being. Kinchega Station remained in the Hughes family for almost a century. In 1883 when Kinchega was at its peak the property was running 160,000 sheep and employed 73 men.

In 1967 Kinchega Woolshed became part of Kinchega National Park, by that time it is estimated that six million sheep had passed through the shed.

The woolshed was restored in 1993.

== Description ==
Kinchega Woolshed is a very large linear building constructed of timber frame with corrugated iron cladding. It consists of 26 stands and is built upon a low sandy hill close to the Darling River. The main structure is constructed of trimmed river gum trunks, sawn roof frames and flooring raised well clear of the ground and a wide pitched roof, skillions and walls sheeted with corrugated iron. A notable feature of the building is the pavilion of sweating pens at the southern end; its light stud-frame construction contrasts with the heavier timber of the original section of the shed.

Nearby are a cluster of small corrugated iron clad buildings containing the shearer's quarters, cookhouse and stores buildings.

Kinchega Woolshed witnessed the evolution in shearing technology that was seen throughout the wool industry during the nineteenth-twentieth centuries. Blades were replaced by mechanical handpieces and the steam traction engine that first powered the machinery stands outside the building. A boiler also is located here. Team was in turn replaced by kerosene and then diesel powered shearing gear. Finally the handpieces were powered by electrical equipment. In addition to the traction engine, the shearing machinery is also present, as is the wool press, wool cranes, a cart and buggy and other equipment.

It was reported to be in good physical condition with medium archaeological potential as at 17 September 1997.

== Heritage listing ==
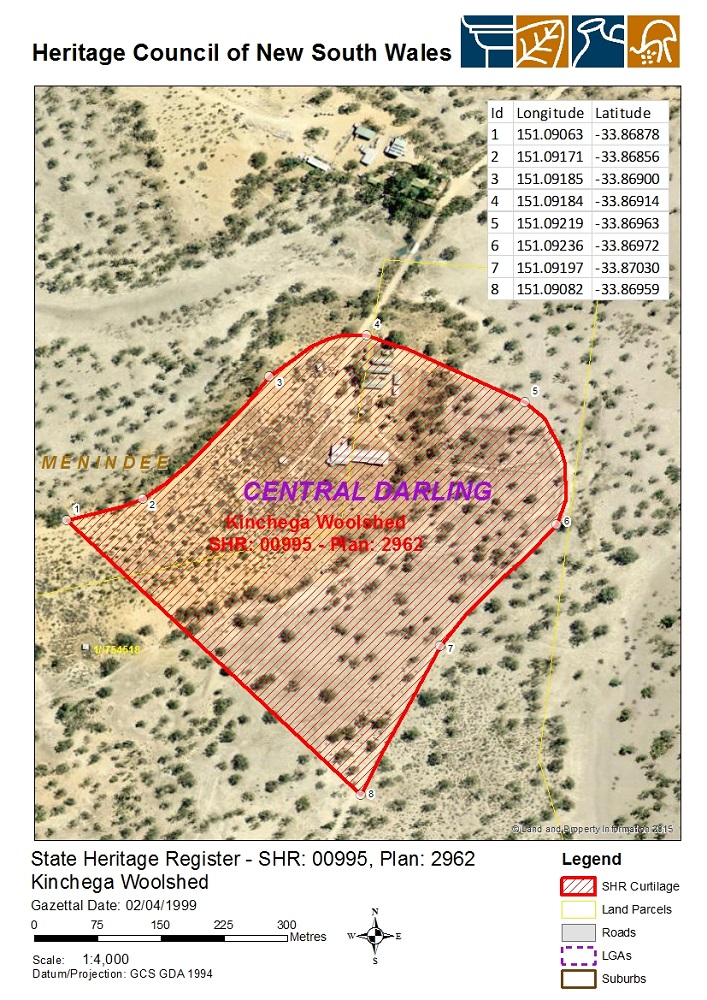
Heritage boundaries

Dating from 1875, Kinchega Woolshed is associated with the early pastoral history of the far west of New South Wales. The building illustrates the huge size of pastoral holdings in the arid areas of Australia and is a good example of a large scale shearing shed. The shed is of notable design, the sweating pens being an important feature of the building. Owing to its site and large dimensions, it is a prominent feature in the arid surrounding landscape and is a visual symbol of the grazing history of the outback. It helps to show the major developments in shearing technology during the century since its construction.

Kinchega Woolshed was listed on the New South Wales State Heritage Register on 2 April 1999 having satisfied the following criteria.

The place is important in demonstrating the course, or pattern, of cultural or natural history in New South Wales.

Dating from 1875, Kinchega Woolshed is associated with the early pastoral history of the far west of New South Wales. The building illustrates the huge size of pastoral holdings in the arid areas of Australia and is a good example of a large scale shearing shed of traditional timber construction.

The place is important in demonstrating aesthetic characteristics and/or a high degree of creative or technical achievement in New South Wales.

The shed is of notable design, the sweating pens being an important feature of the building. Owing to its site and large dimensions, it is a prominent feature in the arid surrounding landscape and is a visual symbol of the grazing history of the outback.

The place has potential to yield information that will contribute to an understanding of the cultural or natural history of New South Wales.

It helps to show the major developments in shearing technology during the century since its construction.

The place is important in demonstrating the principal characteristics of a class of cultural or natural places/environments in New South Wales.

It is perhaps the largest woolshed of its type remaining in the Western District and also one of the better examples.
