= Menindee, New South Wales =

Menindee
- Town
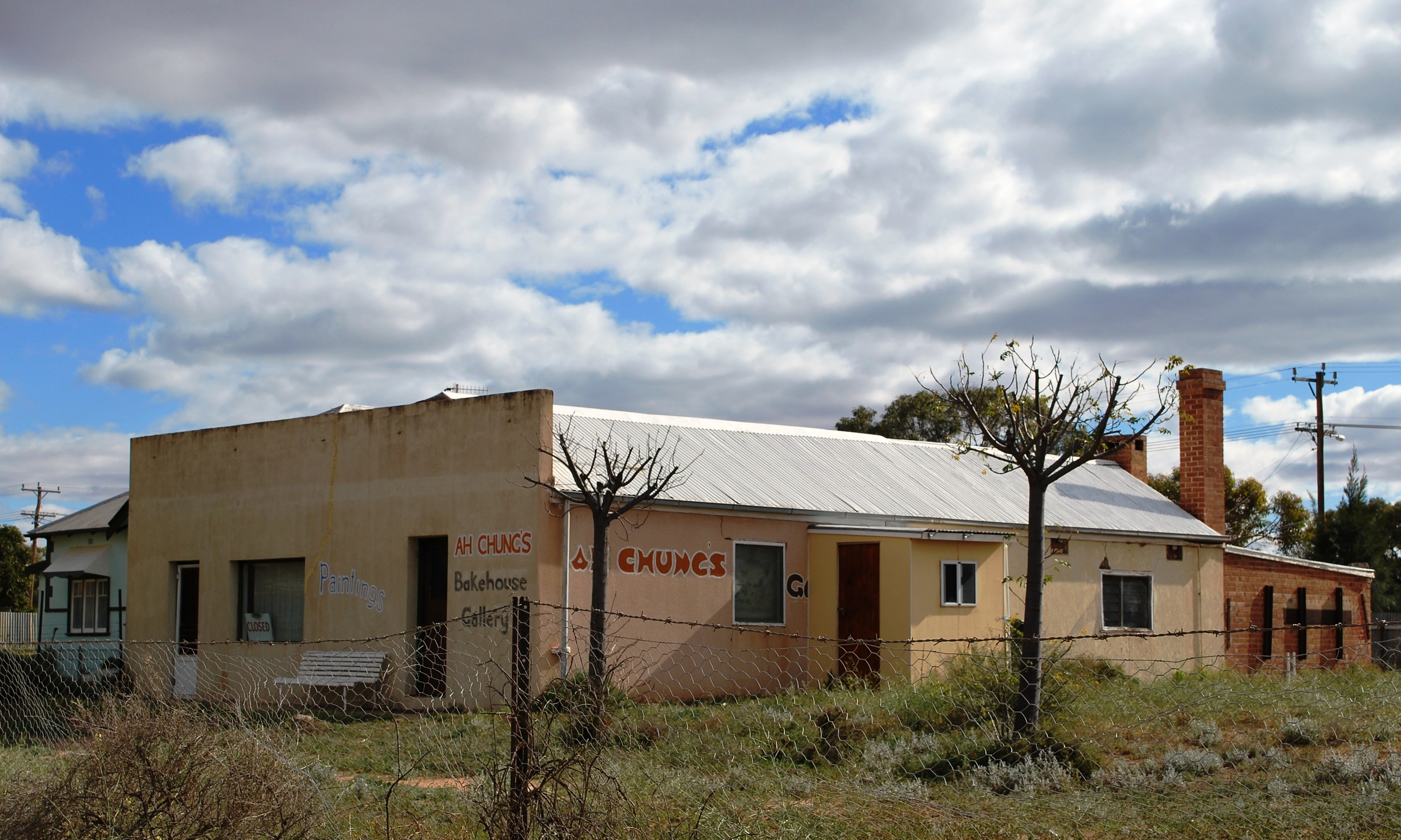
- Ah Chung's Bakehouse Gallery

- Coordinates: 32°23′33″S 142°25′05″E
- Country: Australia
- State: New South Wales
- LGA: Central Darling Shire
- Location: 1,006 km (625 mi) from Sydney; 622 km (386 mi) from Adelaide; 112 km (70 mi) from Broken Hill; 245 km (152 mi) from Wentworth

Government
  - State electorate: Barwon
  - Federal division: Parkes
- Elevation: 61.0 m (200.1 ft)

Population
  - Total: 537 (2021 census)
- Postcode: 2879
- County: Menindee County
- Mean max temp: 25.9 °C (78.6 °F)
- Mean min temp: 11.3 °C (52.3 °F)
- Annual rainfall: 245.8 mm (9.68 in)

Menindee is a small town in the far west of New South Wales, Australia, in Central Darling Shire, on the banks of the Darling River, with a sign-posted population of 980 and a 2021 census population of 537. Menindee was the first town to be established on the Darling River. There are two distinct theories for the derivation of the township’s name: (a) from the Barkindji word "minandichi" for the shallow ephemeral lake north-west of the present-day township; (b) from the Barkindji word 'milhthaka', meaning "yolk of an egg".

== History ==
=== Aboriginal occupation ===
The Menindee district lies within the traditional lands of the Barkindji people, who occupied the area for thousands of years before the arrival of Europeans, with evidence of previous Aboriginal activities going back 35,000 years. Aboriginal people became increasingly concentrated along the Darling River as the nearby Willandra Lakes system began to dry out after the last ice age 20,000 years ago. The area around present-day Menindee was a particularly productive region for Aboriginal occupation with its overflow lakes and channels in combination with the riverine environment.

=== European exploration ===
The first Europeans into the region were an exploring party led by Major Thomas Mitchell in 1835. The expedition had travelled down the Bogan and Darling rivers, intending to follow the course of the Darling to its junction with the Murray. Mitchell and his men encountered bouts of hostility from aboriginal groups as they progressed. In the area of the Menindee Lakes the expedition was subject to increasing confrontation from the native inhabitants and Mitchell decided it would be too dangerous to proceed and decided to turn back. Mitchell named the ephemeral lakes in the area 'Laidley's Chain of Ponds' after James Laidley, the Deputy Commissary-General of New South Wales. The Barkindji people called the lakes 'wontanella' meaning "many waters".

An expedition led by Charles Sturt arrived at Laidley’s Ponds in October 1844, the initial stage of a series of explorations in Central Australia searching for the north-south watershed of the continent and an inland sea. The party established a base camp at Lake Cawndilla (south-west of present-day Menindee) and over two months made several scouting expeditions into and beyond the Barrier Range. In December 1844 Sturt’s party moved further north to the Grey Range, after which they undertook a number of exploratory trips into the dry interior, before returning to Adelaide in January 1846.

=== European settlement ===
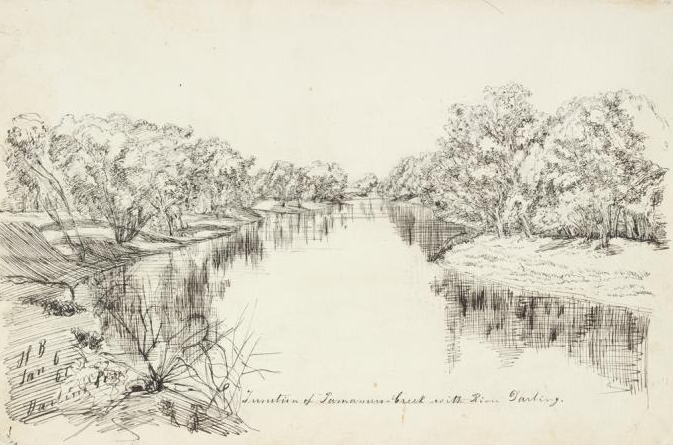
'Junction of the Paramaru Creek with the River Darling' Hermann Beckler (1861)

The Darling Pastoral District between the Murrumbidgee and Darling rivers was officially proclaimed on 4 December 1847. In 1849 Alexander McCallum took up the 'Menindee' pastoral lease. In September 1850 it was reported that "the commandant of the Native Police… and his gallant band" were "at Laidley Ponds" to investigate "aggressions… committed on shepherds". The account stated that "the natives had been very troublesome, and some parties had been obliged to abandon their stations." In 1851 the government surveyor Francis McCabe surveyed and mapped the lower Darling River. His plan of survey named the locality as "Minnindia". In about 1852 Thomas Pain, with his wife Bridget and children, settled at the site of Menindee and built a shanty hotel to provide services to travellers along the Darling River. Another source states the public house was built in about 1855, possibly by "a man named Williams". In any case Thomas Pain was certainly in possession of the building by 1860.

In late January 1859 Captain Francis Cadell in charge of the Albury steamer entered the Darling River at its junction with the Murray and after four days travel he reached the site of Menindee before continuing on for a further four days until he reached the 'Mount Murchison' pastoral run. Cadell’s pioneering voyage on the Darling "demonstrated that the river could be navigated for the purpose of carrying on trade".

In 1860 Thomas Pain was contracted to take mail on horseback once a fortnight along the Darling between Wentworth to Mount Murchison. Francis Cadell established a depot store at Menindee (which he sold in about 1862).

The Burke and Wills expedition camped at Menindee on their journey to cross Australia from Melbourne to the Gulf of Carpentaria. They arrived here on 14 October 1860, crossed the Darling River at Kinchega Station and made Camp XXXIV (their thirty-fourth camp since leaving Melbourne). There was dissent within the party and the deputy-leader George Landells resigned. Robert O'Hara Burke split the party, heading north to Cooper Creek with half the men, stores and animals. The remaining men, stores and animals made a depot camp at Pamamaroo Creek (a sign and cairn mark the site of the camp). This camp was used for the remainder of 1860 and for most of 1861. While in Menindee, Burke stayed at Thomas Pain's hotel. Pain was later reimbursed by the Victorian Exploration Committee for outstanding accounts.

In October 1861 Menindee was described as a settlement consisting of the following buildings: "a public-house, a store, and a hut in the occupation of the police". The population of permanent residents numbered "about fifteen souls, including women and children".

=== A government township ===
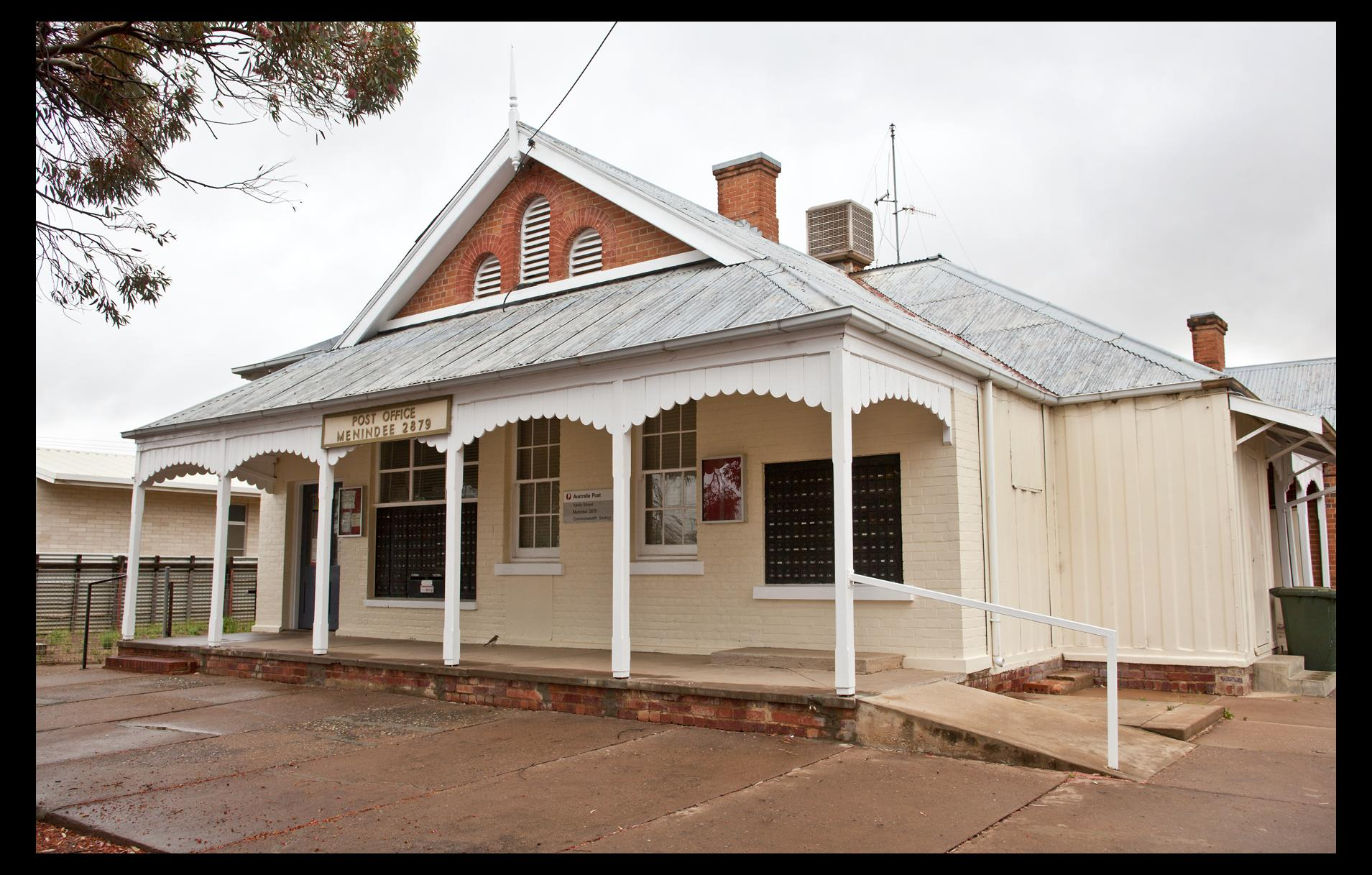
The Menindee Post Office, erected in 1881.

The location of Menindee was surveyed in preparation for land sales in 1861 and the name "Perry" ("with but little regard for euphony") chosen by the colonial government. In June 1862 it was notified that "the approved Plan" for "a Town to be called Perry" had been deposited for public inspection in Sydney and with "the Land Agent at Wentworth". The name "Perry" was unpopular with the locals and the subject of ridicule in the colonial press. One report in July 1862 speculated that the name was a "cheap honor, we suppose, to some political snob" and suggested that "winkle" might have been added to the name "and then we should have known what creature was intended to be honored". The first land sales at Perry (Menindee) were held in July 1862. In November 1863 the previous notification for the town to be called "Perry" was rescinded. The notice in the Government Gazette explained that "it has been considered expedient to alter the name of the Town in question to the native name of the locality, viz., Menindee, by which it is not only better known by the Colonists, but has become celebrated in the annals of Australian Exploration".

In 1866 Thomas Pain sold his inn "to a man named Robertson or Robinson" and "after a few months it again changed hands". The new owner was Christopher Quinn who was granted a publican’s license in July 1866 (probably the first license obtained for the establishment). Quinn named his public house the Menindie Hotel.

An application was submitted in 1868 for a government school at Menindee. Classes began in a temporary structure in 1869. In June 1873 it was reported that the Council of Education in Sydney was experiencing "great difficulty in providing a teacher for the public school at Menindie… on account of the distance of that place from Sydney".

It was recorded in September 1875 that "Menindie maintains a public Hospital, a Catholic Church, besides hotels and stores".

In November 1878 Menindee was described as "yet only a small place", consisting of "four public-houses, two good stores, a Post and Telegraph Office, Court-house, a Police-station, with its necessary adjuncts, and, as near as I could judge, about twenty cottages scattered about".

At the time of the 1881 Census Menindee had a population of 261 persons (156 males and 105 females). A new post and telegraph office was completed at Menindee in 1881. Soon after it was built it was described by a correspondent as "by far the most handsome building in the town". A visitor to Menindee in August 1881 described the lay-out of the town as "higgledy-piggledy", adding: "Perched on a collection of little sandhills, which effectually raise it above all floods, it is composed of buildings, most of them brick, which, judging from their appearance, might have been dropped down by chance, like a collection of children's toy bricks".

At the time of the 1891 Census Menindee had a population of 194 persons (113 males and 81 females).

A January 1924 account of Menindee describes it as "probably the most casual of all villages in the State". The "dozen or so houses that constitute Menindie" seemed to be set out without a town-plan; "of streets or roads, there are none, the only few yards of made surface being the approach to the punt".

A direct railway connection between Sydney and Broken Hill was accomplished with the completion in October 1927 of a railway bridge over the Darling near Menindee. The iron bridge was of the bascule type, with a centre span hinging at one end to permit river steamers to pass. The bridge had provision for a roadway as well as a railway on a single deck.

== Heritage listings ==
Menindee has a number of heritage-listed sites, including:

- 15 km south-west: Kinchega Woolshed

== Population ==
According to the 2021 census, the population of Menindee was 537.

- Aboriginal and Torres Strait Islander people made up 32.6% of the population.
- 74.5% of people were born in Australia and 77.8% of people only spoke English at home.
- The most common responses for religion were No Religion 41.2% and Roman Catholic 17.9%.

According to the 2016 census, the population of Menindee was 551.

- Aboriginal and Torres Strait Islander people made up 36.1% of the population.
- 79.3% of people were born in Australia and 84.3% of people only spoke English at home.
- The most common responses for religion were No Religion 35.3% and Roman Catholic 23.6%.

== Schools ==
Menindee Central School serves K-12.

== Geography ==
The village of Menindee sits on a sandhill above the floodplain on the north bank of the Darling River. The sand dunes and sand plains of the area are characterised by light-textured red sand and loams which are susceptible to wind erosion. The floodplain is characterised by a grey cracking clay (black soil) supporting open woodlands dominated by black box trees.

The Kinchega National Park is situated on the western edge of town.

== Natural environment ==
=== Menindee nightshade ===
The threatened Menindee nightshade (Solanum karsense) is named after the Menindee region, one of the locations where it is known to occur. It is a grey-green downy forb with spines scattered along the stems, bearing purple flowers (typically solanum-type) in spring. The Menindee nightshade is restricted to the far south-western plains of NSW, mainly in the area between the Darling and Lachlan rivers, along the Darling between Menindee and Wilcannia, and across to Broken Hill. It has been recorded from Kinchega National Park near Menindee.

== Water supply ==
A weir on the Darling River near Menindee diverts water from the river into a series of shallow, otherwise dry, overflow lakes. The Menindee Lakes, also known as the Menindee Water Storage Scheme, regulate the river flow for irrigation downstream into South Australia.

Menindee residents had complained about the town's "putrid" water quality and claimed that cotton growers were removing water from the river during the recent drought. Generally the health of river systems is reliant on summer rains. Some locals were carting water from other sources. The WaterNSW advised property owners not to water their stock from the Darling.

The river is subject to blooms of blue green algae in summer. Richard Kingsford, Director of the Centre for Ecosystem Science at the University of NSW said the Menindee Lakes had been drained more often than in the past. In July 2018, 23 gigalitres of environmental water was delivered to the Darling River; this reconnected isolated parts of the river and flushed out algae.

In early 2019, up to one million native fish were found dead along a 40-kilometre stretch of the river in Menindee, including the large and critically endangered Murray cod. The apparent trigger for these deaths was a sudden drop in temperature, causing much of the algae bloom to decompose. The levels of dissolved oxygen in the river then fell too low for the fish to survive.

Widespread rainfall over north-west NSW and southern Queensland during January/February 2020 started to flow into Menindee Lakes (Lake Wetherell) on 10 March. It was estimated that over 550 gigalitres would reach Menindee Lakes as a result of this flow event. Increased numbers of waterbirds have been observed in the area. The area flooded again in early 2023.

== Climate ==
Menindee has a hot desert climate (BWh) under the Köppen climate classification, featuring hot, dry summers and short, cool winters. The annual average rainfall is 284.6 millimetres (11.2 in) which would make it a semi-arid climate except that its high evapotranspiration, or its barrenness, makes it a desert climate. Rainfall varies significantly from year to year, with the town often going without rainfall for months on end, but occasional severe rainstorms can cause falls of over 100 mm in a day, the last time this happened being January 2011.

Menindee is tied with Bourke in recording the highest temperature in New South Wales, with a temperature of 49.7 °C (121.5 °F) recorded on 10 January 1939.

Climate data for Menindee (1876–2024)
Month	Jan	Feb	Mar	Apr	May	Jun	Jul	Aug	Sep	Oct	Nov	Dec	Year
Record high °C (°F)	49.7 (121.5)	47.5 (117.5)	43.4 (110.1)	40.1 (104.2)	33.3 (91.9)	28.9 (84.0)	28.9 (84.0)	32.3 (90.1)	39.5 (103.1)	42.8 (109.0)	46.4 (115.5)	48.9 (120.0)	49.7 (121.5)
Mean daily maximum °C (°F)	34.4 (93.9)	33.8 (92.8)	30.7 (87.3)	25.6 (78.1)	20.7 (69.3)	17.3 (63.1)	17.0 (62.6)	19.3 (66.7)	22.9 (73.2)	26.5 (79.7)	30.0 (86.0)	32.8 (91.0)	25.9 (78.6)
Mean daily minimum °C (°F)	18.5 (65.3)	18.2 (64.8)	15.2 (59.4)	10.9 (51.6)	7.5 (45.5)	5.0 (41.0)	4.1 (39.4)	5.3 (41.5)	8.0 (46.4)	11.3 (52.3)	14.6 (58.3)	16.8 (62.2)	11.3 (52.3)
Record low °C (°F)	7.0 (44.6)	6.4 (43.5)	3.9 (39.0)	2.0 (35.6)	−1.6 (29.1)	−2.8 (27.0)	−3.5 (25.7)	−2.0 (28.4)	0.2 (32.4)	1.0 (33.8)	1.7 (35.1)	6.0 (42.8)	−3.5 (25.7)
Average rainfall mm (inches)	24.0 (0.94)	21.7 (0.85)	18.8 (0.74)	16.8 (0.66)	22.7 (0.89)	21.4 (0.84)	18.3 (0.72)	17.9 (0.70)	18.4 (0.72)	22.8 (0.90)	21.2 (0.83)	21.8 (0.86)	245.8 (9.65)
Average precipitation days	2.5	2.6	2.5	2.8	4.1	4.8	5.0	4.9	3.9	3.9	3.3	2.8	43.1
Source: Bureau of Meteorology

== Transport ==
The transcontinental railway line crosses the Darling River at Menindee. The railway line is about 900 kilometres (560 mi) west of Sydney and about 110 kilometres (68 mi) south-east of Broken Hill. Menindee is served by NSW TrainLink's Outback Xplorer service between Sydney and Broken Hill with one train in each direction per week. Trains head west (to Broken Hill) on Mondays and east on Tuesdays.

A community access bus service runs to Broken Hill and return Monday to Friday (except public holidays), run by CDC Broken Hill (formerly Murton's City Bus Pty Ltd).

No major highway runs through Menindee but the Barrier Highway between Adelaide and Nyngan runs nearby to the north through Broken Hill.

== See also ==
- List of extreme temperatures in Australia
