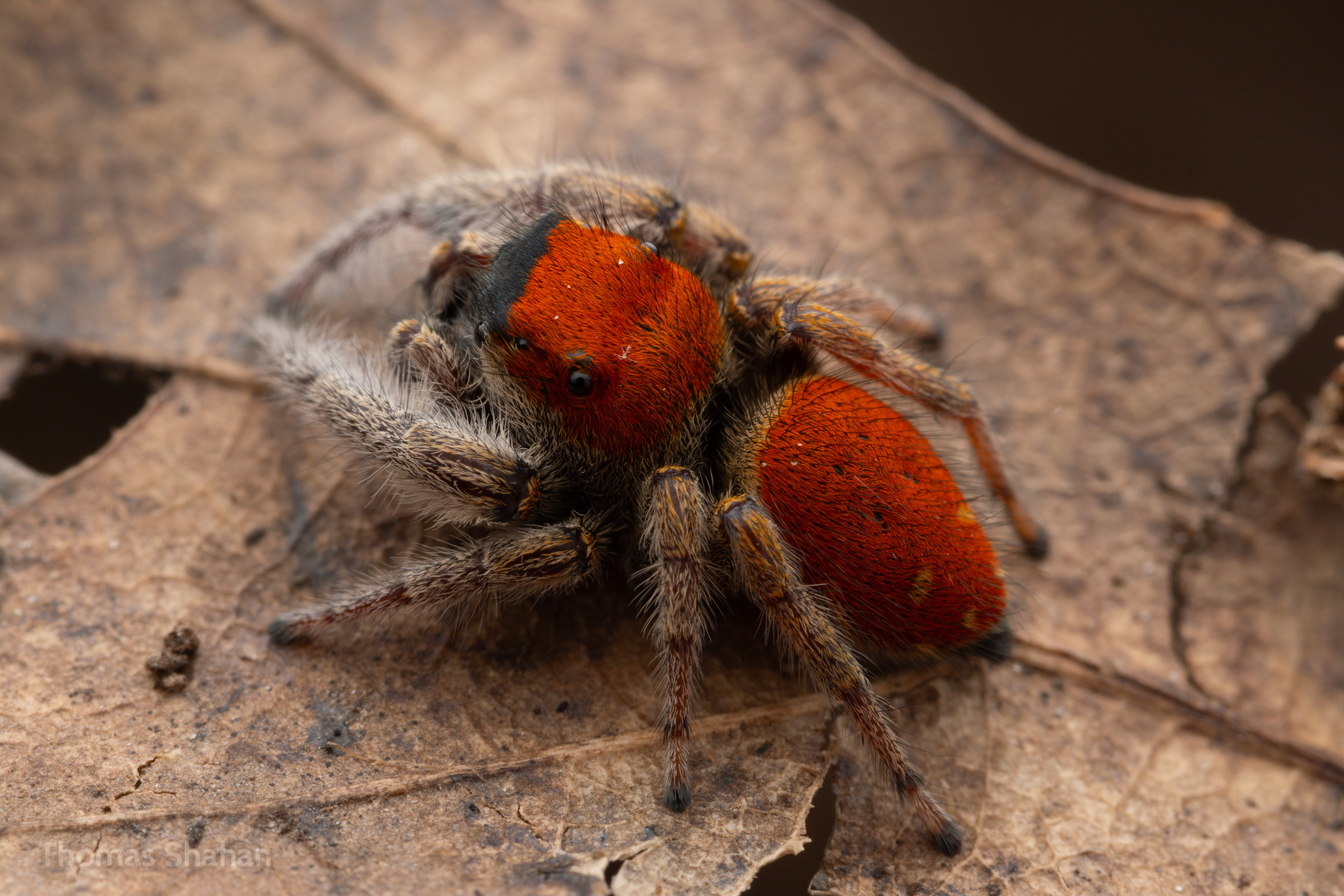
- A mature male specimen found in Oklahoma

Scientific classification
- Kingdom: Animalia
- Phylum: Arthropoda
- Subphylum: Chelicerata
- Class: Arachnida
- Order: Araneae
- Infraorder: Araneomorphae
- Family: Salticidae
- Genus: Phidippus
- Species: P. whitmani

Binomial name
- Phidippus whitmani Peckham & Peckham, 1909
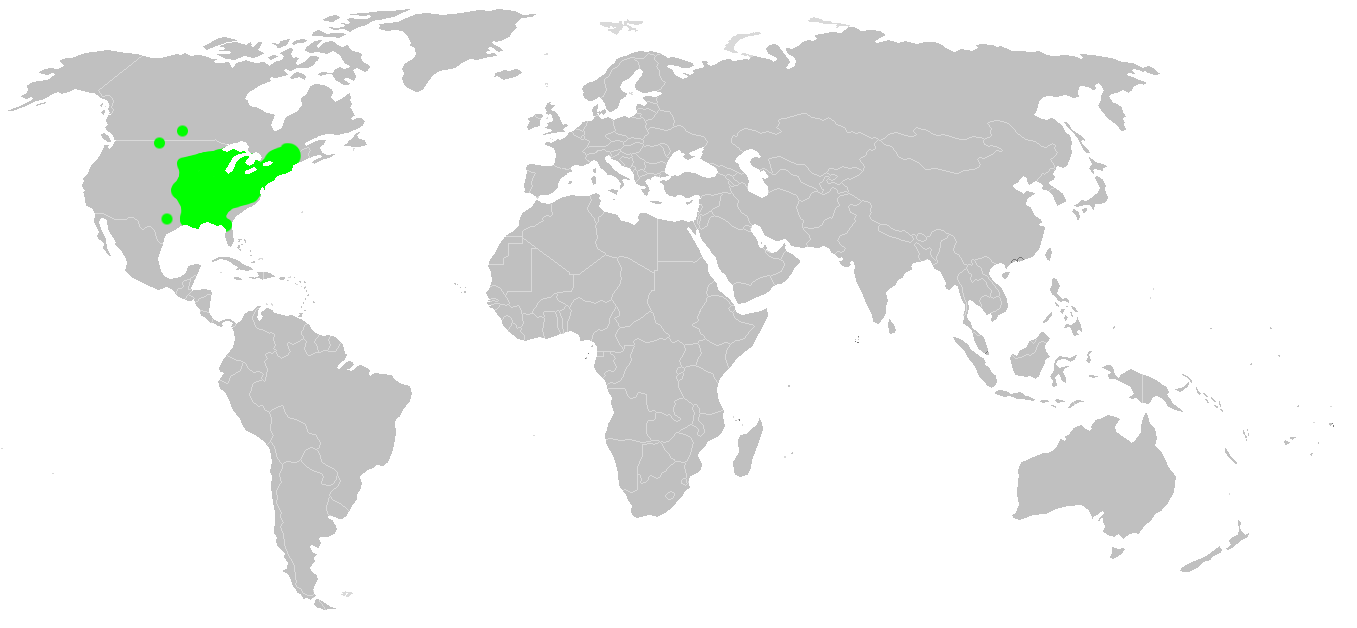

Synonyms
- Phiale modestus; Phidippus paludatus; Dendryphantes whitmani

= Phidippus whitmani =

Species of jumping spider

Phidippus whitmani, also known as Whitman's jumping spider, is a species of jumping spider endemic to North America. It is named after American zoologist Charles Otis Whitman.

== Description ==
Phidippus whitmani displays sexual dimorphism. In male spiders, the top of the abdomen and cephalothorax is strikingly red, with a white band along the top of the abdomen and a lateral band with several small black or white spots in the center. There is a black band in the frontal eye region and white setae on the forelegs. The chelicerae are typically black and fringed with white. Female spiders possess similar patterning to male spiders (spots and bands), although the abdomen and cephalothorax are typically brown in the northern half of the species' range. Female spiders may be red in the southern half of its range.

Spiders mature in May or June, and females tend to lay eggs in July and August.

== Distribution ==
Phidippus whitmani can be found throughout the United States and Canada. In the United States, its range extends from Florida in the south to New York and New Hampshire in the north, and it can be found as far west as Colorado. In Canada, the species can be found throughout Nova Scotia, Newfoundland, Québec, Manitoba, and Ontario. It is ranked as apparently secure in Ontario.

This species is commonly found in older, mixed hardwood forests in leaf litter or on herbaceous vegetation.
