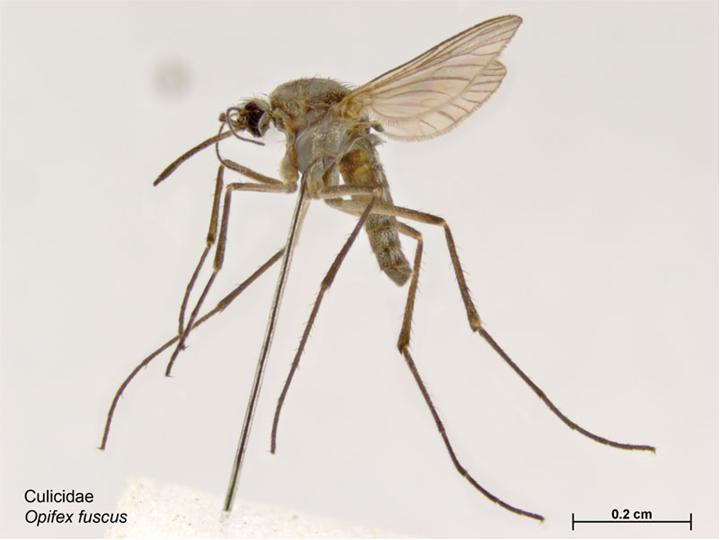
- Opifex fuscus

Scientific classification
- Kingdom: Animalia
- Phylum: Arthropoda
- Class: Insecta
- Order: Diptera
- Family: Culicidae
- Subfamily: Culicinae
- Tribe: Aedini
- Genus: Opifex; Hutton, 1902

= Opifex (fly) =

Genus of mosquitoes

Opifex is a genus of mosquito containing the species Opifex chathamicus and Opifex fuscus.

Opifex fuscus have an unusual mating system. In contrast with most mosquito species, which mate in flight, mating in Opifex occurs on the surface of salt-water pools.

Opifex fuscus males will grab female pupae from under the surface of the water. Females begin reproducing as soon as they come out of their chrysalis.
