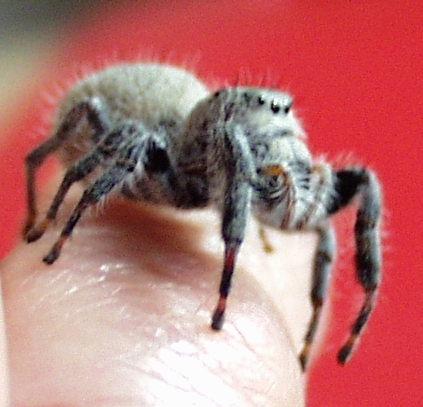

Scientific classification
- Kingdom: Animalia
- Phylum: Arthropoda
- Subphylum: Chelicerata
- Class: Arachnida
- Order: Araneae
- Infraorder: Araneomorphae
- Family: Salticidae
- Genus: Phidippus
- Species: P. octopunctatus

Binomial name
- Phidippus octopunctatus (Peckham & Peckham, 1883)

Synonyms
- Attus octo-punctatus; Attus opifex; Phidippus opifex; Parnaenus griseus; Dendryphantes octopunctatus; Dendryphantes opifex

= Phidippus octopunctatus =

Species of spider

Phidippus octopunctatus is a jumping spider that occurs in the United States and Mexico, mostly in the Great Basin Desert. It is among the largest jumping spiders found in North America, approaching 25 millimetres (0.98 in) in body length. They are gray to brownish-gray in color.

Unlike Phidippus californicus, which lives in the same habitat, it builds a large and prominent nest among the branches of a bush to house its egg cocoon.

Adult males, unmated adult and subadult females can be found in late August.

Phidippus octopunctatus has been observed to hunt large prey, such as grasshoppers and bees.
