= Whataroa virus =

Virus classification
- (unranked): Virus
- Realm: Riboviria
- Kingdom: Orthornavirae
- Phylum: Kitrinoviricota
- Class: Alsuviricetes
- Order: Martellivirales
- Family: Togaviridae
- Genus: Alphavirus
- Species: Alphavirus whataroa

Species of virus

Whataroa virus is a mosquito‑borne RNA virus in the genus Alphavirus (family Togaviridae) first isolated in 1962 near Whataroa in South Westland, New Zealand. It is the only mosquito‑borne virus known to be endemic to New Zealand and is grouped within the Sindbis virus antigenic complex. The virus circulates in a bird–mosquito cycle, and human disease has not been confirmed.

Formally described in 1967, Whataroa virus is adapted to South Westland's cool temperate climate and replicates in mosquitoes at comparatively low temperatures for arboviruses. Despite the wide distribution of its main mosquito vectors in New Zealand, documented activity has remained confined to the Whataroa River valley for more than six decades. Closely related isolates were detected in eastern Australia in 1989–1990, indicating a wider Australasian presence.

As New Zealand's only endemic mosquito‑borne virus, it is monitored for public‑health and biosecurity purposes and used as a bioindicator of how exotic viruses might establish and persist.

== Discovery and classification ==
Whataroa virus is named for the locality of Whataroa, where it was detected during early‑1960s field investigations. In 1962 it was isolated from wild birds and mosquitoes in the Whataroa area during a national survey of arthropod‑borne viruses. It was formally described in 1967 by T. Maguire and J. A. R. Miles, working with virologist J. Casals. They confirmed it as a novel "group A" arbovirus (now Alphavirus) distinct from other known viruses. Serological tests showed that Whataroa virus was antigenically distinct from Sindbis virus, supporting recognition as a separate Alphavirus species.

In modern taxonomy it is placed in the genus Alphavirus, family Togaviridae, and grouped within the Sindbis antigenic complex of the Western equine encephalitis (WEE) complex (also historically called the "Western equine encephalomyelitis" complex) alongside Sindbis, Ockelbo and related viruses. Early phylogenetic analyses of partial E1 and nsP4 sequences placed Whataroa virus with Old World Sindbis‑like viruses within the WEE complex and, unlike New World WEE‑complex viruses, found no evidence of the Eastern equine encephalitis–Sindbis recombinant genome arrangement.

Like other alphaviruses, Whataroa virus has an envelope surrounding a capsid that contains a single‑stranded RNA genome of about 11–12 kb. The genome encodes non‑structural replication proteins and the structural proteins forming the virion, including envelope glycoproteins E1 and E2. By electron microscopy, virions are roughly spherical (about 70 nm in diameter) with surface spikes formed by repeating E1–E2 complexes. Australian isolates from New South Wales (1989–1990) showed 96–97% nucleotide identity to the prototype New Zealand strain and are regarded as antigenic variants of Whataroa virus.

== Ecology and transmission ==
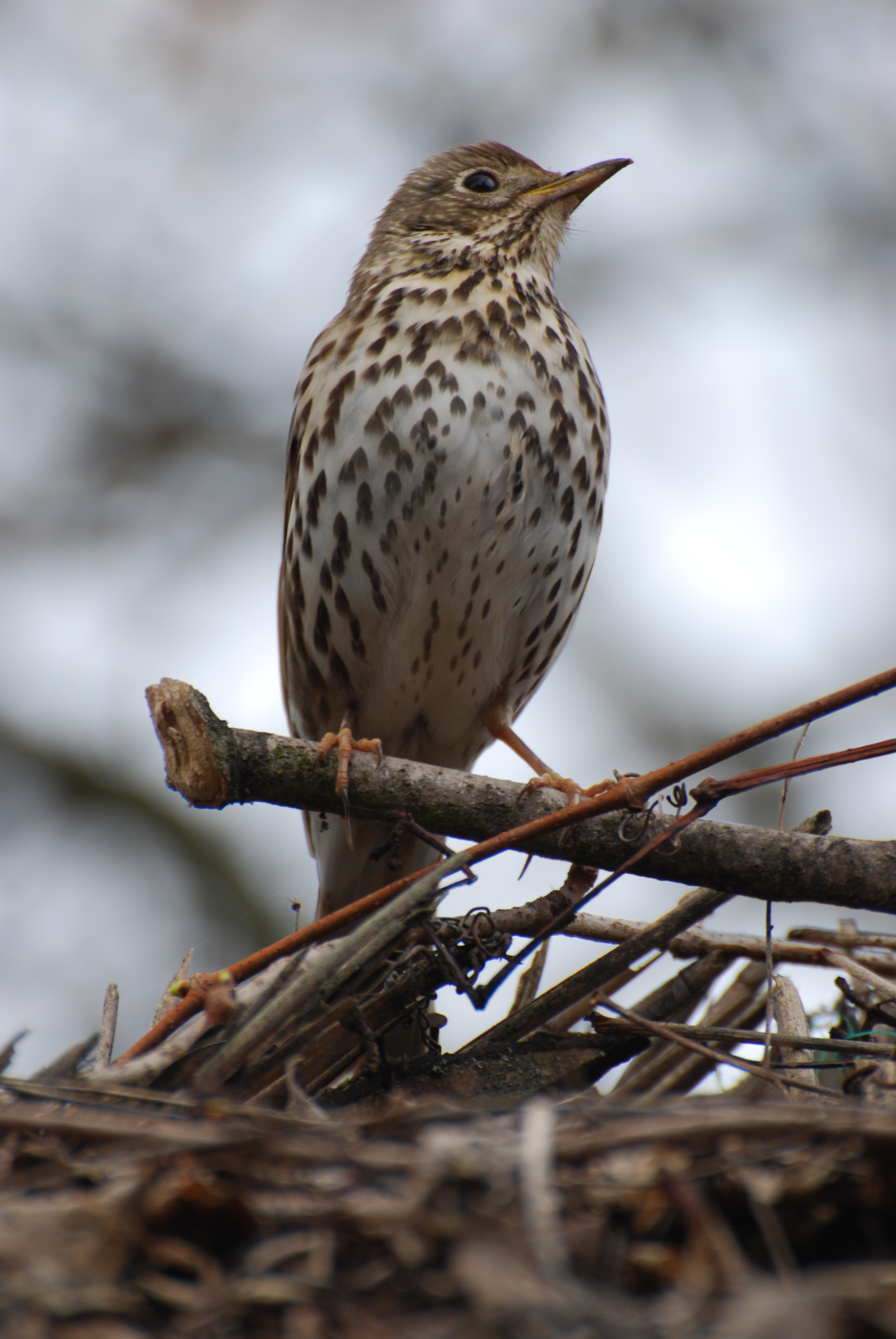
Song thrushes (Turdus philomelos), introduced from Europe, are major reservoir hosts of Whataroa virus in South Westland.

Field studies in South Westland (1964–1969) established that Whataroa virus circulates in an enzootic (natural, wildlife) cycle involving wild birds as vertebrate hosts and mosquitoes as vectors. The principal reservoir hosts are passerine birds, especially song thrushes (Turdus philomelos) and common blackbirds (Turdus merula), which showed the highest rates of infection in the Whataroa area. A five‑year serosurvey (1964–1969) detected Whataroa virus–neutralising antibodies in about 15% of 4,300–4,500 birds across 30 species; thrushes (and early on, blackbirds) had the highest and most persistent seroprevalence. An epizootic peaked in 1965–1966 with monthly seropositivity up to about 70%. Most infections in birds are asymptomatic, and antibodies were detected each year, indicating persistent exposure without obvious illness. A 2022 national catalogue of viruses associated with indigenous Aotearoa New Zealand species identified Whataroa virus as the only case first reported from an indigenous host and later recorded in an introduced host species, consistent with spillover into introduced passerines.

Transmission is by endemic mosquitoes – primarily Culiseta tonnoiri and the vigilant mosquito (Culex pervigilans) – which feed predominantly on birds and thereby maintain the bird–mosquito cycle with limited spillover to mammals. Whataroa virus has been isolated from both species in the Whataroa region, confirming them as natural vectors. Under laboratory conditions, some Culiseta tonnoiri that fed on viraemic suckling mice transmitted the virus on subsequent feeds, corroborating a competent vector role. Experimental infections also showed high vector competence in Aedes australis (a laboratory analogue for South Westland species), with transmission typically only after about 17 days of extrinsic incubation at 20 °C.

Whataroa virus is well adapted to South Westland's cool, temperate environment and replicates in mosquitoes at lower temperatures than other arboviruses studied at the time. By 20 °C in laboratory studies, antigen appeared in some salivary‑gland cells within 18–36 hours (depending on the infection route) and, once present, persisted for at least 122 days. Mosquitoes transmitted reliably only after high titres accumulated in salivary glands, consistent with an extended extrinsic incubation period at cooler temperatures. Enzootic maintenance appears local: birds often carried antibodies on emerging from winter, suggesting overwintering by low‑level chronic infection in birds and/or survival in dormant vectors. In experiments, the virus infected and persisted in the argasid tick Ornithodoros capensis, raising the possibility of arthropod reservoirs, though there is no field evidence of a continuous tick‑borne cycle; the primary cycle is bird–mosquito.

== Geographic distribution and surveillance ==
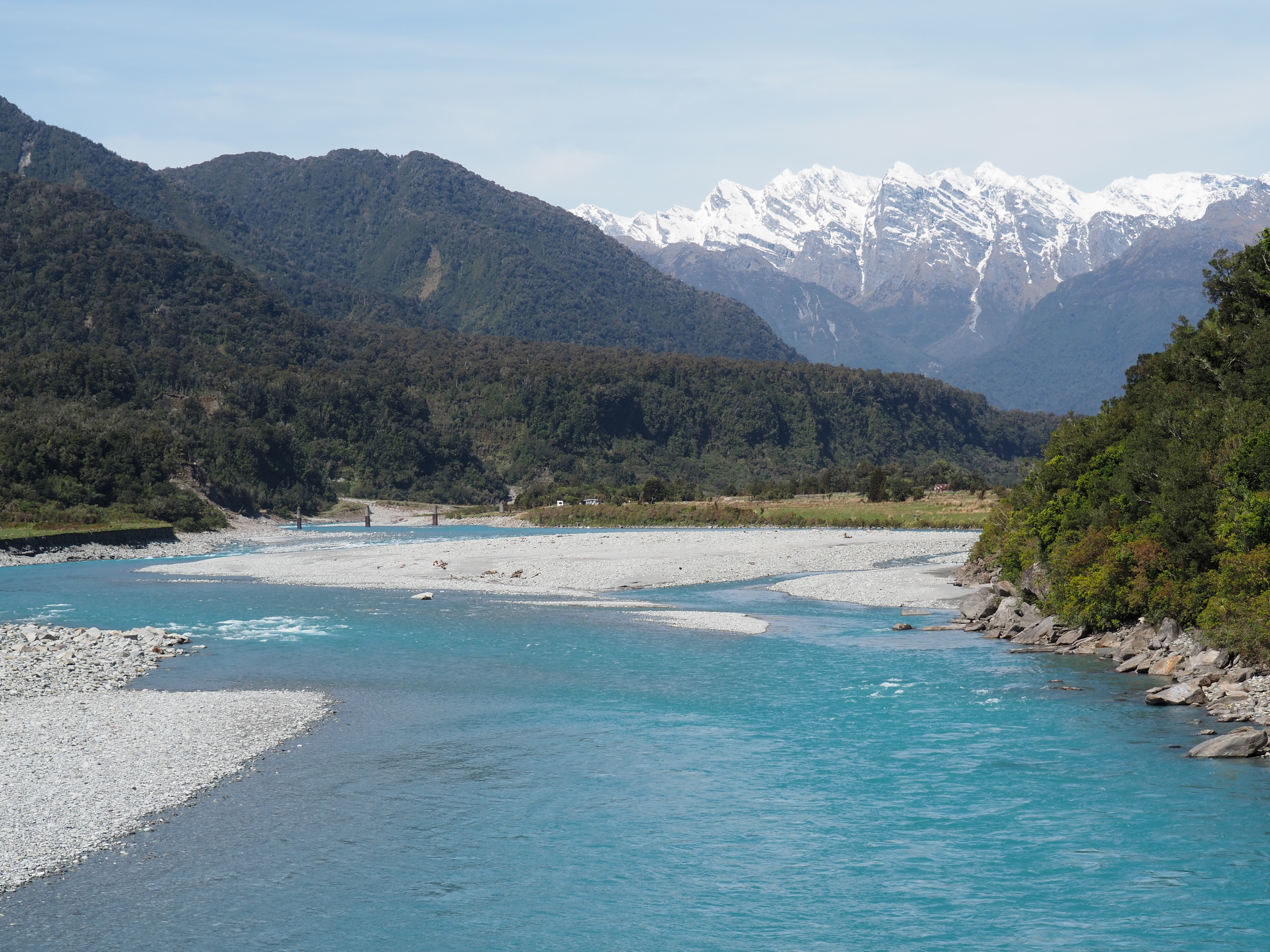
The Whataroa River valley, South Westland, where Whataroa virus was discovered in 1962 and continues to circulate in a bird–mosquito cycle

Whataroa virus has a very limited known geographic range. Intensive ecological work in the 1960s identified a focal transmission zone in the Whataroa River valley and surrounding lowlands where key mosquito and bird species co‑occur. Despite extensive attempts during 1964–1969 (no arbovirus was recovered from 3,800 bird blood samples or from about 63,000 mosquitoes collected locally) the serology showed sustained, local activity. Outside this focus, no other endemic mosquito-borne viruses were detected in New Zealand, and Whataroa virus remained geographically restricted despite the widespread presence of Culex pervigilans elsewhere in the country. A pilot genus‑wide RT‑PCR survey (2000–2001) screened 6,293 mosquitoes from several regions (Kaipara Harbour, northern Hawke's Bay, Gisborne and the West Coast) and detected no Alphavirus RNA, demonstrating feasibility of molecular surveillance but reinforcing the focal nature of Whataroa virus. After a 40‑year gap with no monitoring, a 2010 survey at Whataroa again detected the virus (by molecular methods) in a small fraction of introduced thrushes and blackbirds (3/95; 3.2%); concurrent trapping did not detect it in mosquitoes, suggesting that bird sampling is the more sensitive indicator of low‑level circulation.

Beyond New Zealand, Whataroa virus (or very close variants) has been found in Australia. Several Alphavirus isolates from mosquitoes collected in New South Wales (1989–1990) were 96–97% identical in nucleotide sequence to the New Zealand prototype and were antigenically very similar, differing only in a few minor epitopes. This was the first isolation outside the original New Zealand focus and indicates a broader Australasian distribution, probably maintained in local bird–mosquito cycles. The route between New Zealand and Australia is uncertain – migratory birds or human‑assisted mosquito transport are plausible – but there is no record of outbreaks in Australia, and detection has been through specialised mosquito surveillance. A 2013–2014 serosurvey of 287 horses in northern Queensland found rare Whataroa‑like neutralising antibodies (about 1.4% of properties), though cross‑reaction with Sindbis‑like alphaviruses could not be excluded; significance for Australian equids remains uncertain.

== Human infection and public health significance ==
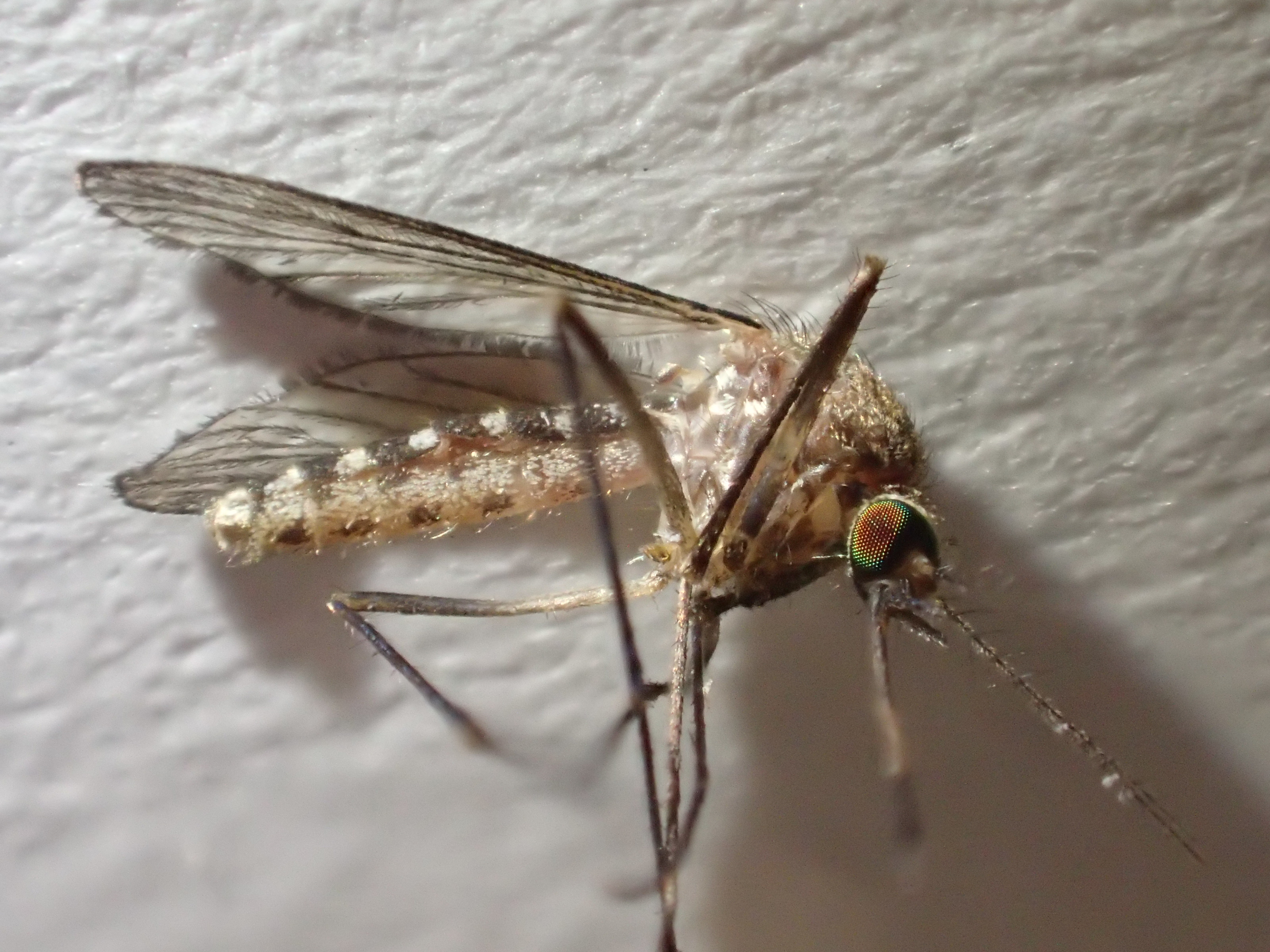
The vigilant mosquito (Culex pervigilans), one of the two primary vectors that transmit Whataroa virus between birds in New Zealand

No confirmed human illnesses or outbreaks have been attributed to Whataroa virus in New Zealand or elsewhere. In 2005 a published correspondence debated possible human infection: Ministry of Health advisers suggested there was evidence of symptomless infection on the West Coast, whereas the original authors judged the data inconclusive and stated that no definite human cases had been confirmed in New Zealand. By analogy with related Sindbis‑group alphaviruses, any human infection would be expected to cause a mild influenza‑like illness, if it occurs at all. Overall, humans appear to be incidental hosts at most, given the virus's preference for bird hosts and the bird‑biting habits of the endemic mosquito vectors. Modern surveys have not documented seroconversion or clinical cases despite long‑term environmental presence.

New Zealand public health guidance treats Whataroa virus as a low, residual risk. Its persistence shows that exotic arboviruses can establish silent enzootic cycles in local ecosystems. Surveillance interest continues, particularly under environmental‑change scenarios; for example, the late‑1990s incursion of the exotic southern saltmarsh mosquito (Aedes camptorhynchus; later eradicated) prompted concern about the potential for Ross River virus should competent vectors establish.
