= Aedes australis =

Scientific classification
- Kingdom: Animalia
- Phylum: Arthropoda
- Clade: Pancrustacea
- Class: Insecta
- Order: Diptera
- Family: Culicidae
- Genus: Aedes
- Subgenus: Halaedes
- Species: A. australis

Binomial name
- Aedes australis (Erichson, 1842)

Synonyms
- Culex australis Erichson, 1842; Halaedes australis (Erichson, 1842); Culex crucians F. H. Walker, 1856; Culicada tasmaniensis E. H. Strickland, 1911; Caenocephalus concolor F. H. Taylor, 1914

Species of mosquito

Aedes australis is a brackish water mosquito species from the subgenus Halaedes. It is native to Australia. It was first found in New Zealand in 1961 and is now present in the southern half of the South Island.

== Habit and habitat ==
The species breeds in littoral rock and brackish pools just above the tide line and remains close to their breeding habitats. Additionally, most adult females have been known and tested to be autogenous which allows females to lay their first batch of eggs before taking or ingesting a blood meal. Their autogenous capacities can however be greatly altered by the conditions that surround them in their environment, such as temperature. The percentage of autogenous females from the same breeding pool can vary from 40% in the summer to 85% in the winter due to temperature swings and slower development. There are anautogenous populations of Aedes australis in Tasmania and South Australia, meaning those mosquitoes have to consume blood to reproduce. A. australis are almost exclusively anautogenous in eastern New Zealand. In addition, humans are the most common source of blood for A. australis in those regions.

The eggs of this species are rhomboidal in both ventral and dorsal view.
