= Kinchega National Park =

National park in New South Wales, Australia

- IUCN category II (national park)
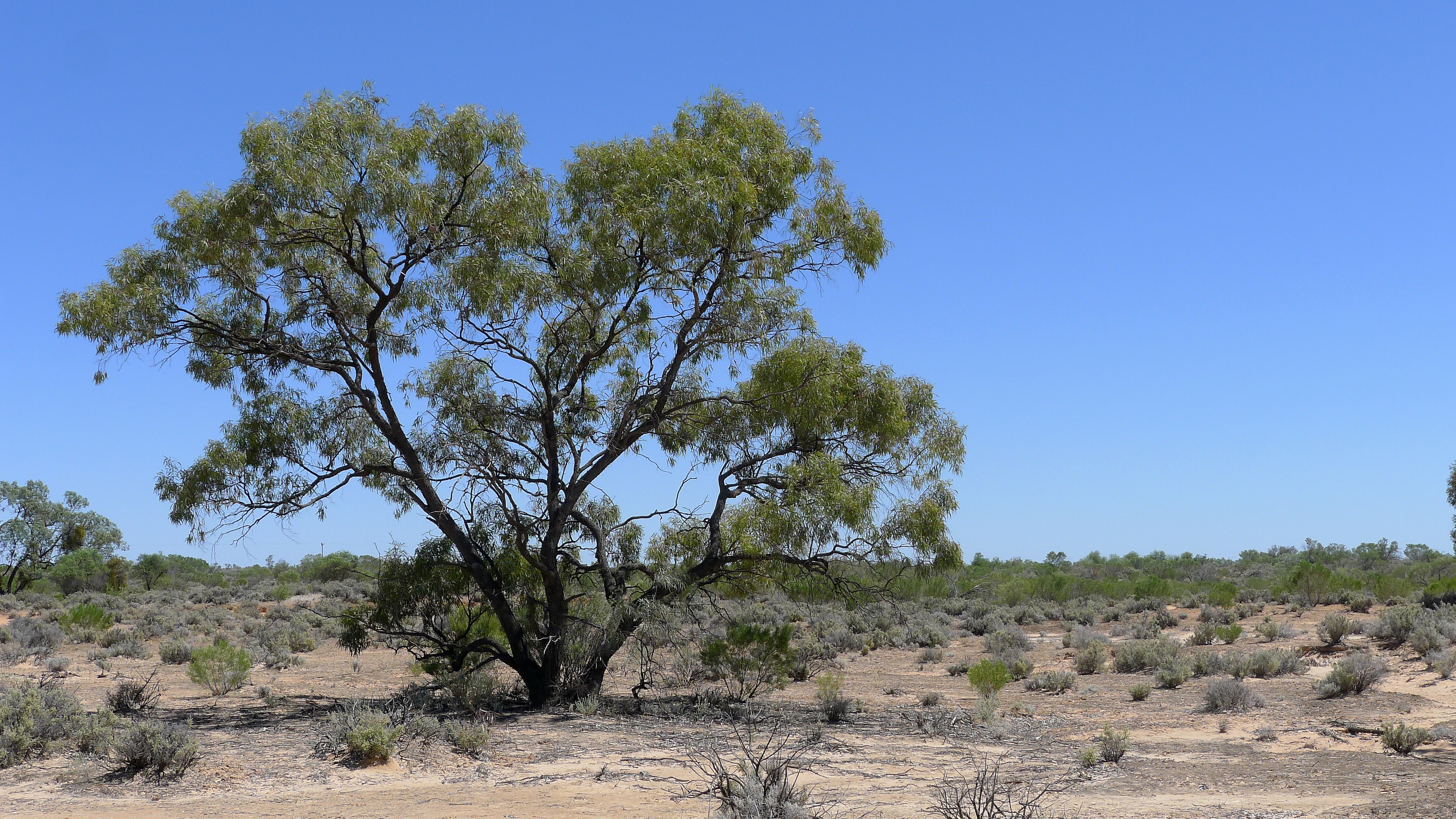

- Location within New South Wales
- Location: New South Wales
- Nearest city: Menindee
- Coordinates: 32°32′39″S 142°17′50″E
- Area: 442.59 km^{2} (170.88 sq mi)
- Established: 1 October 1967
- Governing body: NSW National Parks & Wildlife Service
- Website: Official website

The Kinchega National Park is a protected national park in the Far West region of New South Wales, in eastern Australia.The 44,259-hectare (109,370-acre) national park is located approximately 840 kilometres (520 mi) west of Sydney and 111 kilometres (69 mi) south-east of Broken Hill. The park adjoins the town of Menindee. The eastern edge of the Kinchega National Park is formed by the Darling River.

The park is noted for its Aboriginal artefacts, left behind by the Paarkantji people, who travelled up and down the Darling River.

== Fauna ==
It is home to many species of wild animals, such as lace monitor, Peron's tree frog, pink and black cockatoos, kultarr.

== See also ==
- Protected areas of New South Wales
