= Department of Creative Industries, Tourism, Hospitality and Sport =

Department of the New South Wales Government

Department overview
- Formed: 1 July 2024; 2 years ago
- Preceding Department: Department of Enterprise, Investment and Trade
- Jurisdiction: New South Wales
- Headquarters: Sydney, Australia
- Ministers responsible: The Hon. John Graham MLC, Minister for the Arts; Minister for Music and the Night-time Economy; The Hon. David Harris MP, Minister for Gaming and Racing; The Hon. Steve Kamper MP, Minister for Sport; Minister for Jobs and Tourism
- Department executive: Elizabeth Mildwater, Secretary
- Website: www.nsw.gov.au/departments-and-agencies/creative-industries-tourism-hospitality-and-sport

The Department of Creative Industries, Tourism, Hospitality and Sport (DCITHS), a department of the government of New South Wales, delivers services that promote trade, hospitality, racing, arts, tourism and sport in the state of New South Wales, Australia.

The department was formed on 1 July 2024 following the announcement from the Minns Labor Government on 12 April 2024 that the New South Wales Department of Enterprise, Investment and Trade would be re-organised as part of a Machinery of Government change.

== Structure ==
The department is led by secretary, presently Elizabeth Mildwater since July 2024. The Deputy Secretary of Corporate Services is presently Lisa Alonso Love and the Deputy Secretary of Hospitality and Racing is presently Tarek Barakat.

=== Ministers ===
The following ministers are responsible for the administration of the department and its agencies:

- Minister for the Arts
- Minister for Gaming and Racing
- Minister for Jobs and Tourism
- Minister for Music and the Night-time Economy
- Minister for Sport

=== Agencies administered ===
The following agencies are administered by the department, classified by groups:

- Creative industries and tourism
  - Art Gallery of New South Wales
  - Australian Museum
  - Create NSW
  - Destination NSW
  - Museum of Applied Arts & Sciences
  - Museums of History NSW
  - State Archives and Records Authority of NSW
  - State Library of New South Wales
  - Sydney Opera House
- Hospitality
  - Greyhound Welfare and Integrity Commission
  - Independent Liquor and Gaming Authority
  - Liquor & Gaming NSW
  - NSW Independent Casino Commission
  - Office of Racing
  - Office of Responsible Gambling
  - Office of the 24-Hour Economy Commissioner
- Sport
  - New South Wales Institute of Sport
  - Office of Sport
  - Venues NSW

== See also ==
- List of New South Wales government agencies
