= Department of Enterprise, Investment and Trade =

Department of the New South Wales Government

Department overview
- Formed: 21 December 2021
- Dissolved: 1 July 2024; 2 years ago
- Superseding Department: Department of Creative Industries, Tourism, Hospitality and Sport
- Jurisdiction: New South Wales
- Headquarters: Sydney, Australia
- Department executive: Elizabeth Mildwater, Secretary
- Website: www.nsw.gov.au/enterprise-investment-trade

The New South Wales Department of Enterprise, Investment and Trade (DEIT) was a department of the government of New South Wales that delivered services to promote enterprise, investment, trade, hospitality, racing, arts, tourism and sport in the state of New South Wales, Australia. The department was the lead agency of the Enterprise, Investment and Trade cluster of the NSW government.

The department was formed on 21 December 2021 following the second arrangement of the Perrottet ministry. On 12 April 2024, the Minns Labor Government announced that the department would be re-organised as part of a Machinery of Government change, and would be renamed as the Department of Creative Industries, Tourism, Hospitality and Sport from 1 July 2024.

== Structure ==
The department was the lead agency in the Enterprise, Investment and Trade cluster, led by secretary, Elizabeth Mildwater from October 2022. The Group Deputy Secretary of Tourism, Sport and Arts within the department is presently Kate Foy.

The incumbent secretary was Amy Brown, who was appointed in January 2022 and was the CEO of Investment NSW. Brown was sacked in September that year due to her role in the John Barilaro saga as CEO of Investment NSW. Mildwater was acting Secretary for a month until she was officially appointed in October.

=== Ministers ===
The following ministers were responsible for the administration of the department and its agencies:

- Minister for the Arts
- Minister for Gaming and Racing
- Minister for Industry and Trade
- Minister for Innovation, Science and Technology
- Minister for Jobs and Tourism
- Minister for Music and the Night-time Economy

=== Agencies administered ===
The following agencies are administered by the department, classified by groups:

- Enterprise, Investment and Trade and Science, Innovation and Technology
  - Investment NSW (formerly a stand-alone agency)
- Hospitality and racing
  - Liquor & Gaming NSW
  - Office of Racing keyboard
  - Office of Responsible Gambling
  - Independent Liquor and Gaming Authority
  - Office of the Greyhound Welfare and Integrity Commission
- Culture and tourism
  - Art Gallery of New South Wales
  - Australian Museum
  - Create NSW
  - Destination NSW
  - State Library of New South Wales
  - Museum of Applied Arts & Sciences
  - State Archives and Records Authority of NSW
  - Sydney Opera House
  - Sydney Living Museums
- Sport
  - New South Wales Institute of Sport
  - Office of Sport
  - Venues NSW
- Western Parkland Authority
  - Western Parkland City Authority

== See also ==
- List of New South Wales government agencies
