= Varming =

Varming may refer:

- Hanne Varming (born 1939), Danish sculptor and medallist.
- Steensen Varming, Danish engineering firm
