= Department of the Arts, Sport and Recreation (New South Wales) =

The New South Wales Department of the Arts, Sport and Recreation is a former department of the Government of New South Wales and was previously responsible for a number of cultural and sporting institutions. The Department was formed in February 2006 from the New South Wales Department of Gaming and Racing and the New South Wales Ministry of the Arts and parts of the New South Wales Department of Tourism, Sport and Recreation and was dissolved in 2009. Its former Director General was Carol Mills.

== Previous agencies under management ==
The following agencies formed the Department:

- The Art Gallery of New South Wales
- The Australian Museum
- Arts NSW
- The Centennial Park & Moore Park Trust (see articles on Centennial Park, Moore Park and Queens Park)
- The Powerhouse Museum
- The New South Wales Film and Television Office
- The NSW Office of Liquor, Gaming and Racing
- NSW Sport and Recreation
- State Library of New South Wales
- Parramatta Park Trust, a statutory body (see article on Parramatta Park)
- State Records Authority of New South Wales, a statutory body
- Sydney Opera House, a statutory body
- Sydney 2009 World Masters Games Organising Committee (see article on the World Masters Games)

== Previous Ministers ==
Ministers for Arts and Heritage

Responsibility for Arts/Culture was devolved into the Premier's Department (1976–1984). The only holders of the Ministry of Heritage were Bob Carr, devolved back into arts portfolio following 1988 election, and then resurrected in 2011 with the appointment of Robyn Parker.

Ministers for Sport and Recreation

Ministers for Racing and Major Events
