= Landcom =

Landcom may refer to:

- Allied Land Command, headquarters for NATO land forces
- Landcom (New South Wales), New South Wales government housing organisation

== See also ==
- Land.com, a subsidiary of CoStar Group
