= Meroogal =

Historic building in New South Wales, Australia

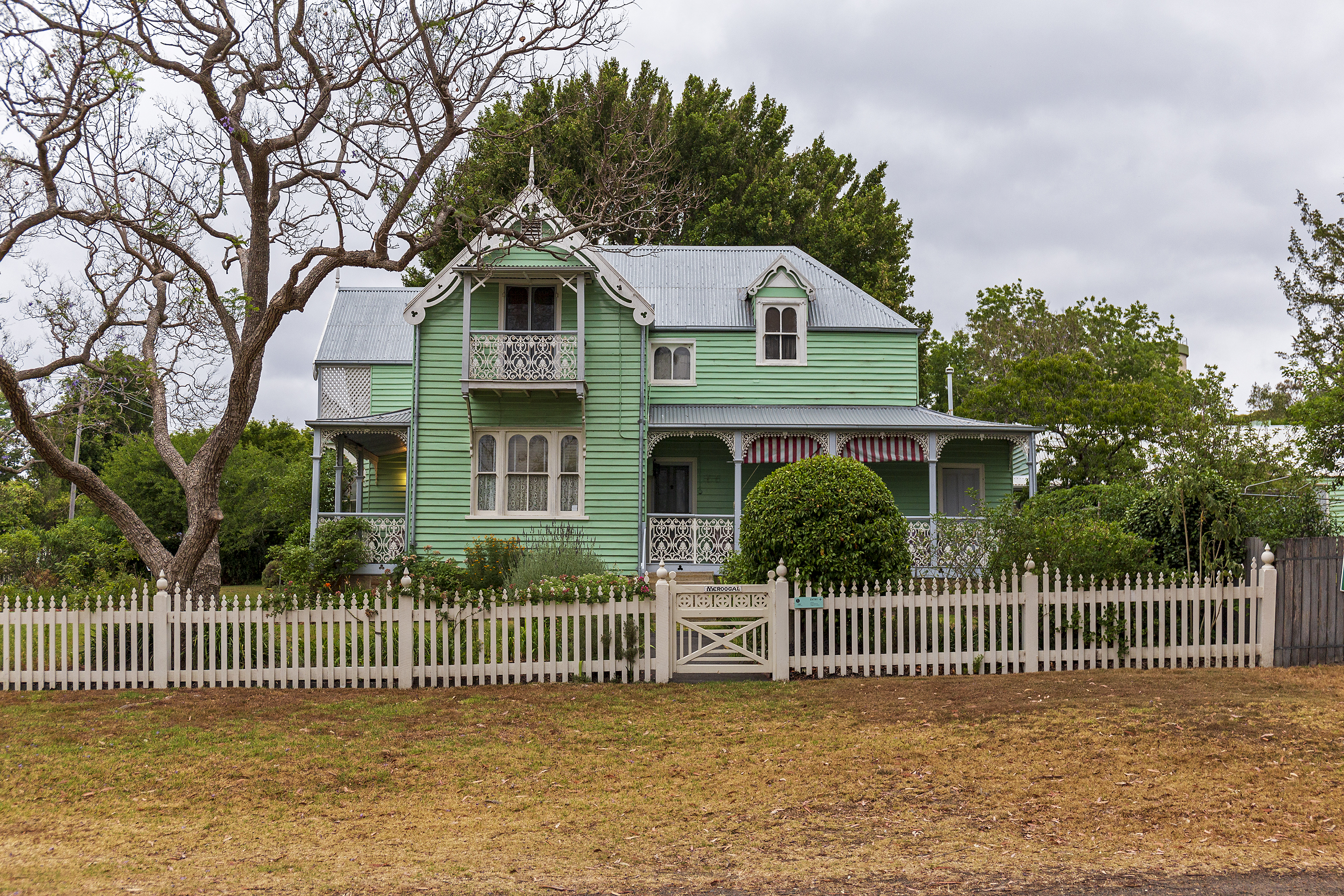
- View from Worrigee Street

- Location within New South Wales Location within Australia
- 34.8754°S 150.5927°E
- Location: 35 West Street, Nowra, City of Shoalhaven, New South Wales, Australia

History
- Built: 1886–1886

Site notes
- Architect: Kenneth Mackenzie
- Owner: Museums of History NSW

New South Wales Heritage Register
- Official name: Meroogal
- Type: state heritage (built)
- Designated: 2 April 1999
- Reference no.: 953
- Type: historic site
- Builders: Kenneth Mackenzie

Meroogal is a heritage-listed former residence and now house museum at 35 West Street, Nowra, City of Shoalhaven, New South Wales, Australia. It was designed by Kenneth Mackenzie and built in 1886 by Kenneth Mackenzie. The property is owned by the Museums of History NSW. It was added to the New South Wales State Heritage Register on 2 April 1999.

== History ==
Meroogal was constructed in 1886 for occupation by Mrs Jessie Catherine Thorburn, a widow, and her four unmarried daughters. It was a modest building in comparison to the grand late 19th century houses in Sydney, but quite grand compared to other residences in Nowra. The only properties of significantly greater value were banks and hotels. Finance for the project was provided by her eldest son, Robert Taylor Thorburn. He appears to have had the available funds due to his partnership in a goldmine at Yalwal, 26 kilometres south west of Nowra. Her brother Kenneth Mackenzie designed the house. Kenneth Mackenzie probably built or at least supervised Meroogal's construction as well, as he had designed and built several buildings at Cambewarra, eight kilometres north west of Nowra. The house stood on an original allotment of just over one hectare.

The impetus for building Meroogal appears to have been the marriage of Robert Taylor Thorburn and the family's desire to move to town for business and social reasons.

Thorburn married Jessie Billis in 1885 and bought the land for Meroogal in September that year. When Meroogal was completed in May 1886 the family moved from their property, Barr Hill, to Nowra. Jessie Catherine and her daughters went to Meroogal and Thorburn and his wife went to another house in Nowra. Barr Hill was let to a share farmer.

Between 1886 and 1900 the occupants of the house temporarily changed. However, by 1900 the occupants were the same as those who had moved in originally, Jessie Catherine and her four daughters – Annabella Jane (Miss Belle), Georgina Isabella (Miss Georgie), Jessie Catherine (Miss Kate) and Fanny Kennina (Miss Tottie).

In 1914 a substantial portion of what was then Lot 5 was resumed to provide an additional water reservoir for Nowra. This was the first of several lots to be sold, transforming the original 5 acre property to what is now far less than half the size. The majority of original Meroogal land has now been developed for urban use.

In 1916 Jessie Catherine died. In the same year her second daughter Mary Susan Macgregor and her husband came to live in Kintore, the cottage built for their retirement on Meroogal land. The two families associated daily and ate together regularly.

The site of the cottage built in 1916 is vacant following a fire which destroyed it in the mid-1970s.

Between 1916 and 1939 numerous family members and other visitors came to stay at Meroogal, some for lengthy periods of time. During this period two of the original four sisters died and Mary Macgregor moved into Meroogal, leasing Kintore to tenants. When Miss Kate died in 1940 the remaining sister, Miss Tottie went to live with relatives and did not return to Meroogal. This left Helen Macgregor, Mary Macgregor's daughter who had moved to Meroogal in 1930, as the principal occupant from 1945 until 1969. Her sisters were regular visitors. Her sister Elgin came to live there in 1971 and remained there until 1977.

In the mid-1920s the Thorburn sisters maintained the ordered household regime developed in the 19th century, with tasks divided between them. The Thorburns and Macgregors all led active social lives through their family and friends and their activities with local organisations. Yet despite the mixing of Thorburns and Macgregors and the generations, there were differences between them and these are remembered by the living members of the families. The personalities and interests of the women who occupied and ran Meroogal are evident in these recollections, the fabric of the building and changes to it, the furniture and contents of the house and the remaining personal belongings. These include diaries, scrap books, work books and other items.

From the late 1940s there has been a succession of tenants sharing the house with the Macgregors, with the two rear bedrooms used by the tenants. The sequence and nature of this is unclear.

Between 1941 and 1959 the original one hectare allotment was subdivided, losing parts of the garden. The flower garden and back yard were retained.

From 1978 until mid-1985 Meroogal was used by June Wallace, Mary Macgregor's granddaughter, her children and some other Macgregor descendants as a holiday house.

The property is now owned by the NSW Government's Historic Houses Trust and open to the public on appointed days as a house museum.

== Description ==
Meroogal is a late Victorian, two-storey weatherboard cottage with verandahs and balconies on two similar street frontages and includes a servants' wing. The walls are weatherboard on stone foundations and the roof of corrugated iron. Internally the floors are original hardwood and the joinery cedar. The building features elaborate bargeboards, cast-iron balustrades on timber verandahs and balconies, arched window sashes and french doors and dormer windows in two sides. The internal walls are wallpapered, the ceilings panelled, doors four panelled and the staircase is cedar. The joinery throughout is painted and the fireplaces and mantels are cast iron.

Upstairs there are lining boards on the walls and ceiling and four bedrooms, two with timber balconies and cast-iron fireplaces.

The servants' wing consists of three rooms and a verandah and is connected to the kitchen by a short, covered way.

The house is surrounded by a picket fence with gates on each street front. Shaded by two large jacaranda trees (Jacaranda mimosifolia), Meroogal's garden layout is edged with glazed border tiles.

It was reported to be in good physical condition as of 17 September 1997.

The Contents

The contents of Meroogal embody many family ties and associations together with unconscious and self-conscious decisions to dispose of some possessions and keep others. Although the furniture has changed substantially, the rooms retain the flavour of Victorian period decoration, particularly in relation to paintings, pictures and photographs. The contents and furnishings include items from each generation of occupants and include items originally brought from Barr Hill.

Between 1946 and 1977 many pieces of furniture and other contents were sold or given away. It is also likely that when Kintore was let to tenants in 1948 some of the valued furniture and contents were moved to Meroogal and elsewhere. When the cottage was sold in 1959 the remaining furniture was brought to Meroogal and/or sold.

It is the most intact collection of Victorian period furniture, and other related house contents known in an urban area in NSW.

The Garden

The house stood on an original allotment of just over one hectare.

The garden was a source of pride to the Thorburns and the Macgregors, the latter winning a prize in The Sydney Morning Herald garden Competition in the 1960s. A remnant of the 1920s orchard fence and gate remains.

Between 1941 and 1959 the original one hectare allotment was subdivided, losing parts of the garden. The flower garden and back yard were retained.

Since HHT acquisition, it was decided to restore the garden to its appearance in the late 1920s, which was largely unchanged from its original form. The fences and flowerbeds have been reconstructed and a host of perennial and annual plants have been re-introduced into the garden. In spring roses mix with Iris, stocks, larkspurs and love-in-a-mist (Nigella damascena) in the beds. White blossoms on the Damson plum trees (for jam), old "California Crown" apple and "Williams" pear, and later purple jacarandas make a great show in the garden. The garden is now about 1/10 of the size of the original one hectare allotment

=== Modifications and dates ===
- 1886–1936 – Painting and decoration most frequent, house was originally on just over one hectare allotment
- c. 1890s – New kitchen and lumber room added
- c. 1909 – Planting of Jacaranda trees (Jacaranda mimosaefolia)
- 1912 – Telephone facilities added
- c. 1912 – Town water connected
- 1916 – Cottage named Kintore built for the Macgregors
- 1939 – Sewerage connected and necessary alterations made.
- c. 1939 – earth closet beyond the servant's wing demolished
- 1941–59 – 1 hectare allotment subdivided, losing parts of the garden. Flower garden and back yard retained.
- Post 1950 – Current decorative finishes are added.
- 1958 – Gas connected and necessary alterations made
- c. 1977 – Kintore cottage destroyed by fire.
- c. 1980 – stables demolished
- 1984 – reconstruction of new picket fence similar, but not identical, to the old.

== Heritage listing ==
Meroogal is of outstanding cultural significance. The property, together with associated documents and the recollections of people associated with it, provides a remarkable opportunity to understand and demonstrate aspects of the relationships between a family and its individual members and their material culture. The primary significance of Meroogal is as an artefact of history and its evidence of the lives of four generations of one family who lived in the house, their history and its evidence of taste and circumstances.

Meroogal was listed on the New South Wales State Heritage Register on 2 April 1999 having satisfied the following criteria.

The place is important in demonstrating the course, or pattern, of cultural or natural history in New South Wales.

Meroogal is historically significant for its evidence of 19th century Nowra and association with several prominent families in the district

The place is important in demonstrating aesthetic characteristics and/or a high degree of creative or technical achievement in New South Wales.

Meroogal is aesthetically significant for its substantial contribution to the townscape of Nowra and its skilful design demonstrating the adaption of ideas from America.

The place has potential to yield information that will contribute to an understanding of the cultural or natural history of New South Wales.

Meroogal is significant for its evidence of, and ability to demonstrate, the life and role of women in the late 19th and the 29th century, its potential to demonstrate aspects of domestic and family life in the period from it construction to 1956 and its evidence of a substantial town house with ancillary uses.

The place possesses uncommon, rare or endangered aspects of the cultural or natural history of New South Wales.

Meroogal is a rare example of the continuance and adaption of Victorian taste within a house of the same period.
