= Create NSW =

New South Wales government agency

Agency overview
- Formed: 13 May 1971 (Ministry of Cultural Activities); 1 April 2017 (Create NSW)
- Preceding agencies: Ministry of Cultural Activities (1971–1975); Department of Culture, Sport and Recreation (1975–1976); Cultural Activities Division (1976–1984); Office of the Minister for the Arts (1984–1988); Ministry for the Arts (1988–2006); Arts NSW and Screen NSW (2006–2017)
- Jurisdiction: New South Wales
- Headquarters: 323 Castlereagh Street, Sydney
- Minister responsible: Minister for the Arts
- Agency executive: Kerri Glasscock, Executive Director, Create NSW
- Parent Department: Department of Creative Industries, Tourism, Hospitality and Sport
- Website: www.nsw.gov.au/departments-and-agencies/create-nsw

Create NSW is a government agency of the Government of New South Wales, that falls within the Creative Industries, Tourism, Hospitality and Sport cluster. The agency was created on 1 April 2017 from an amalgamation of Arts NSW (ANSW) and Screen NSW. Create NSW is responsible for administering government policies that support the arts, artists and the various cultural bodies within the state of New South Wales in Australia, and for the provision of funding. It also provides secretarial and administrative support to the Arts & Culture Advisory Committee, a high-level committee which works with the government to help shape policy and promote the arts throughout the state.

As of June 2025, Kerri Glasscock was appointed Executive Director of Create NSW. The agency advises the Minister for the Arts. Ultimately, the Minister is responsible to the Parliament of New South Wales.

== History ==
=== Arts minister role ===
The role of an "arts" minister, overseeing the management and support for all cultural activities in New South Wales, before the early 1970s was an unheard of concept in politics. However, by the early 1970s, various governments in Australia recognised the need for a steering authority for state support for the arts. In response, premier Bob Askin appointed George Freudenstein as the first Minister for Cultural Activities on 11 March 1971. On his appointment Freudenstein requested the establishment of an organisation to enable him to carry out his responsibilities and the Premier agreed. On 13 May 1971 the Ministry of Cultural Activities was established, taking over responsibility for various legislation and bodies that had previously been under the purview of the Department of Education, including the Archives Office of New South Wales, Art Gallery of New South Wales, State Library of New South Wales, Australian Museum, Museum of Applied Arts and Sciences, Sydney Observatory, the Advisory Committee on Cultural Grants, NSW Film Council, and the Sydney Opera House Trust. In the case of the opera house, the Ministry had responsibility for its completion and final official opening on 20 October 1973.

With Freudenstein's departure on 3 January 1975, a new Minister for Culture, Sport and Recreation was appointed and on 6 January 1975, the Ministry of Cultural Activities was replaced by the new Department of Culture, Sport and Recreation. This arrangement lasted until 14 May 1976 when the new Labor Government of Neville Wran transferred the responsibility for cultural activities to the Premier's Department. This became the Cultural Activities Division under the administration of the Premier himself. This situation continued until 1984, when Wran established the Office of the Minister for the Arts within the Premier's Department and commissioned himself with the title of Minister for the Arts.

On 15 June 1988 a Ministry for the Arts independent of the Premier's Department was established.

=== 2006: Arts NSW created ===
This Ministry for the Arts was abolished on 3 March 2006 and its responsibilities were moved to the new Department of the Arts, Sport and Recreation. Arts NSW became the new dedicated division for the Minister, and it transferred to "Communities NSW" in July 2009 and then the Department of Trade and Investment, Regional Infrastructure and Services from 4 April 2011. From the appointment of Troy Grant as the Minister in 2014, Arts NSW fell within the Department of Justice.

Between 2014 and 2020, the organisation was shuffled through four departments.

=== 2017: Create NSW ===
Create NSW was created via an amalgamation of Arts NSW and Screen NSW on 1 April 2017. The Screen NSW banner was removed, CEO Courtney Gibson left the role, and Michael Brealey, then acting executive director of Arts NSW, became CEO of the new agency. In April 2017, an arm of Create NSW was established (Create Infrastructure) dedicated to the planning and delivery of cultural infrastructure.

The agency fell within the Arts, Screen and Culture Division of the Department of Planning and Environment (abolished on 1 July 2019) at the time of the publication of its 2018 Cultural Infrastructure Plan 2025+. As a result of a government restructure in April 2019 after a state election, Create NSW was moved to the Minister for the Public Service and Employee Relations, Aboriginal Affairs, and the Arts, then held by Don Harwin and administered through the Community Engagement portfolio of the Department of Premier and Cabinet headed by Deputy Secretary, Community Engagement, Clare Foy.

On 28 June 2019, Harwin announced a revamp to the process of application, assessment and delivery of NSW arts funding. The main differences, largely driven by the findings of the 2018 NSW Arts Summit, Arts 2025, were:

- a streamlined approach that consolidated the existing 14 funding rounds into two annual calls for funding;
- a reduction in the assessment criteria for funding applications from 26 to 3; and
- replacement of the cross-sector peer review panels by ten new "Artform Assessment Boards".

In addition, the requirement that an organisation had to receive project funding for three consecutive years in order to qualify for annual funding was dropped.

In September 2019, a restructuring of the leadership team of Create NSW led to the resurrection of the Screen NSW brand, and Grainne Brunsdon appointed head of that team, which remained part of Create NSW. Screen NSW moved out of Create NSW in 2024, and in 2026 became a standalone division in the Department of Creative Industries, Hospitality, Tourism and Sport.

== Structure, role and activities ==
=== Role and organisational structure ===
Create NSW is "the NSW Government’s arts, screen and culture development, policy and infrastructure planning and delivery body". Between 2019 and 2021 the agency was responsible to the Minister for the Public Service and Employee Relations, Aboriginal Affairs, and the Arts and was administered through the Department of Premier and Cabinet. It was one of five branches of the Community Engagement Group within the department. In a rearrangement of the Perrottet ministry, Create NSW was transferred to the newly established Enterprise, Investment and Trade cluster and a Minister for the Arts established to guide the agency's direction.

It also provides secretarial and administrative support to the Arts & Culture Advisory Committee, a high-level committee which works with the government to help shape policy and promote the arts throughout the state.

As of May 2020, the executive team was headed by Kate Foy (Deputy Secretary, Community Engagement), Chris Keely (Executive Director, Create NSW) and Grainne Brunsdon (Head of Screen NSW), along with seven other members of the team. As of June 2025, Kerri Glasscock was appointed Executive Director of Create NSW.

Also under the arts portfolio are statutory authorities of the Sydney Opera House, Australian Museum, Art Gallery of NSW, State Library of NSW, Museum of Applied Arts and Sciences (MAAS), and Sydney Living Museums and the State Archives and Records Authority (SARA, aka NSW State Archives and Records), but these are separate from Create NSW.

=== Infrastructure and properties ===
As of 2020, Create NSW's infrastructure redevelopment projects included: Artspace, Theatre Royal, the Australian Museum, Riverside Theatres, the new Powerhouse Museum, Sydney Opera House renewal, expansion of the Art Gallery of NSW ("Sydney Modern Project"), and Walsh Bay Arts Precinct. The Regional Cultural Fund is also under infrastructure.

As of 2020, Create NSW managed nine properties in and around the Sydney CBD: Carriageworks multi-arts centre, the former Darlinghurst Gaol, the Walsh Bay Arts Precinct (including Wharf 4/5), the Roslyn Packer Theatre, the Parachute Ground at Lilyfield, The Gunnery, Garry Owen House, and the Arts Exchange in The Rocks area.

=== Arts organisations and festivals ===
The NSW performing arts sector includes 11 of Australia’s major performing arts organisations, including The Australian Ballet, Australian Brandenburg Orchestra, Australian Chamber Orchestra, Bangarra Dance Theatre, Bell Shakespeare Company, Belvoir, Musica Viva Australia, Opera Australia, Sydney Dance Company, Sydney Symphony Orchestra, and the Sydney Theatre Company.

Create NSW provides support for four major cultural festivals: the Biennale of Sydney, the Sydney Festival, the Sydney Film Festival, and the Sydney Writers' Festival. In collaboration with the federal government through the Visual Arts and Craft Strategy (VACS), Create NSW helps to support the careers of artist, craft practitioners and arts professionals such as curators, through programs at the Australian Centre for Photography, Art Gallery of NSW, Sydney Biennale, dLux MediaArts, Artspace Visual Arts Centre (housed in The Gunnery), the Australian Design Centre and the Museum of Contemporary Art Australia.

== Funding for the arts in NSW ==
Because of the changes in name and organisational structure over the years, funding by Create NSW is difficult to track, but in 2013–14, Arts NSW allocated A$53 million to arts and cultural development, and in 2018–9, A$55.4 million in arts grants. In addition, the 2018–9 Cultural Infrastructure Plan allocated A$645 million to the new Powerhouse Museum in Parramatta, and large amounts to the Walsh Bay Arts Precinct, Art Gallery of NSW’s Sydney Modern Project, Sydney Opera House renovations, the Riverside Theatres redevelopment, the Regional Cultural Fund, and expansion of the Australian Museum, totalling A$1.6 billion on infrastructure. After so much spending on buildings, there was less left for spending on either commissions by artists or emergencies. Owing to the impact of the COVID-19 pandemic in Australia, special sector support packages were provided by the governments of South Australia (A$1.5 million), Queensland (A$8 million) and Victoria (A$16.8 million), while as of May 2020 Create NSW had only redirected A$2 million of its existing budget to support the arts during the crisis.

== Agency executives ==
Name	Title	Term start	Term end	Time in office	Notes
C. G. Meckiff	Secretary of the Ministry of Cultural Activities	1971	1975		
C. G. Meckiff	Under Secretary of the Department of Culture, Sport and Recreation	1975	1976		
Evan Williams	Director of the Division of Cultural Activities	1976	1984		
Evan Williams	Director, Office of the Minister for the Arts	1984	1988		
Evan Williams	Secretary of the Ministry for the Arts	1988	2001		
Roger Wilkins	Director-General of the Ministry for the Arts	2001	2006		
Bob Adby	Director-General, Department of the Arts, Sport and Recreation	2006	2007		
Peter Loxton (acting)	Director-General, Department of the Arts, Sport and Recreation	November 2007	February 2008		
Carol Mills	Director-General, Department of the Arts, Sport and Recreation	February 2008	2009		
Mary Darwell	Executive Director, Arts NSW	2008	2016?		
