= Sydney Mint =

Heritage-listed building in Sydney

- Sydney
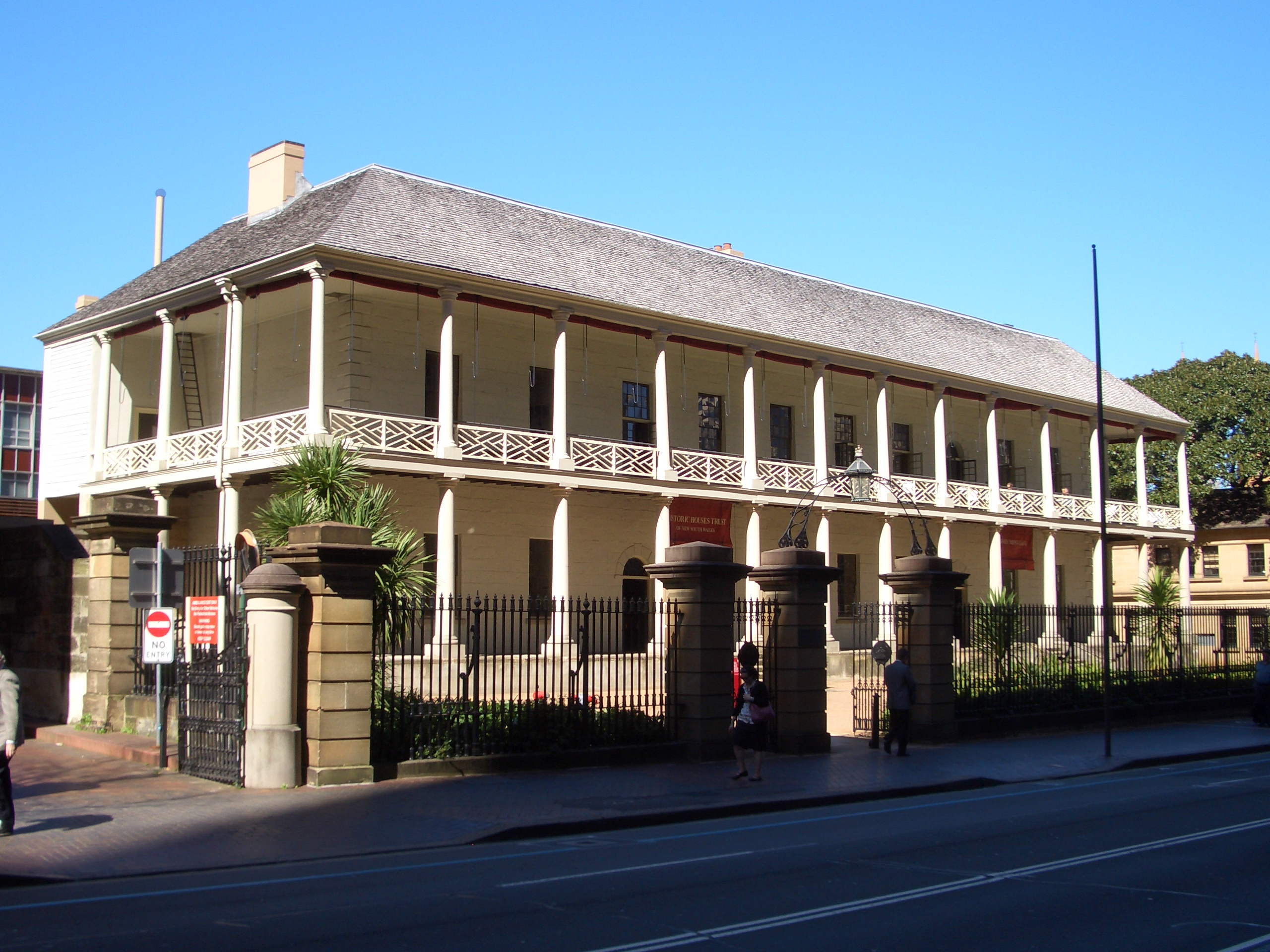

- Location within Sydney

General information
- Location: Macquarie Street, Sydney, Australia
- Coordinates: 33°52′08″S 151°12′45″E
- Opened: 1816 (Hospital); 1854 (Mint)
- Owner: Museums of History NSW

Design and construction
- Architects: Captain F.C. Ward & Joseph Trickett

New South Wales Heritage Register
- Official name: Mint Building and Hyde Park Barracks Group; Rum Hospital; Royal Mint – Sydney Branch; Sydney Infirmary and Dispensary; Queen's Square Courts; Queen's Square
- Type: State heritage (Complex / Group)
- Criteria: a., c., d., e., f.
- Designated: 2 April 1999
- Part of: Mint Building and Hyde Park Barracks Group
- Reference no.: 190
- Type: Other – Government & Administration
- Category: Government and Administration
- Builders: Garnham Blaxcell, Alexander Riley and D'Arcy Wentworth

The Sydney Mint in Sydney, New South Wales, Australia, is the oldest surviving public building in the Sydney central business district. Built between 1811 and 1816 as the southern wing of the Sydney Hospital, it was then known as the Rum Hospital. In 1854 a mint was established on the site with the hospital building used to house mint staff as well as providing a residence for the Deputy Mint Master. A coining factory was built at the rear. Both of these structures have exceptional heritage significance and have been associated with major events in the colonial history of New South Wales.

Located in Sydney's central business district at 10 Macquarie Street, it is near many other famous Australian historical buildings including Hyde Park Barracks, St James' Church and Parliament House. The building is now the head office of Museums of History NSW and is listed on the New South Wales State Heritage Register. Sections of the building are open to the public.

== History ==
=== General Hospital and The Dispensary (1811–1854) ===
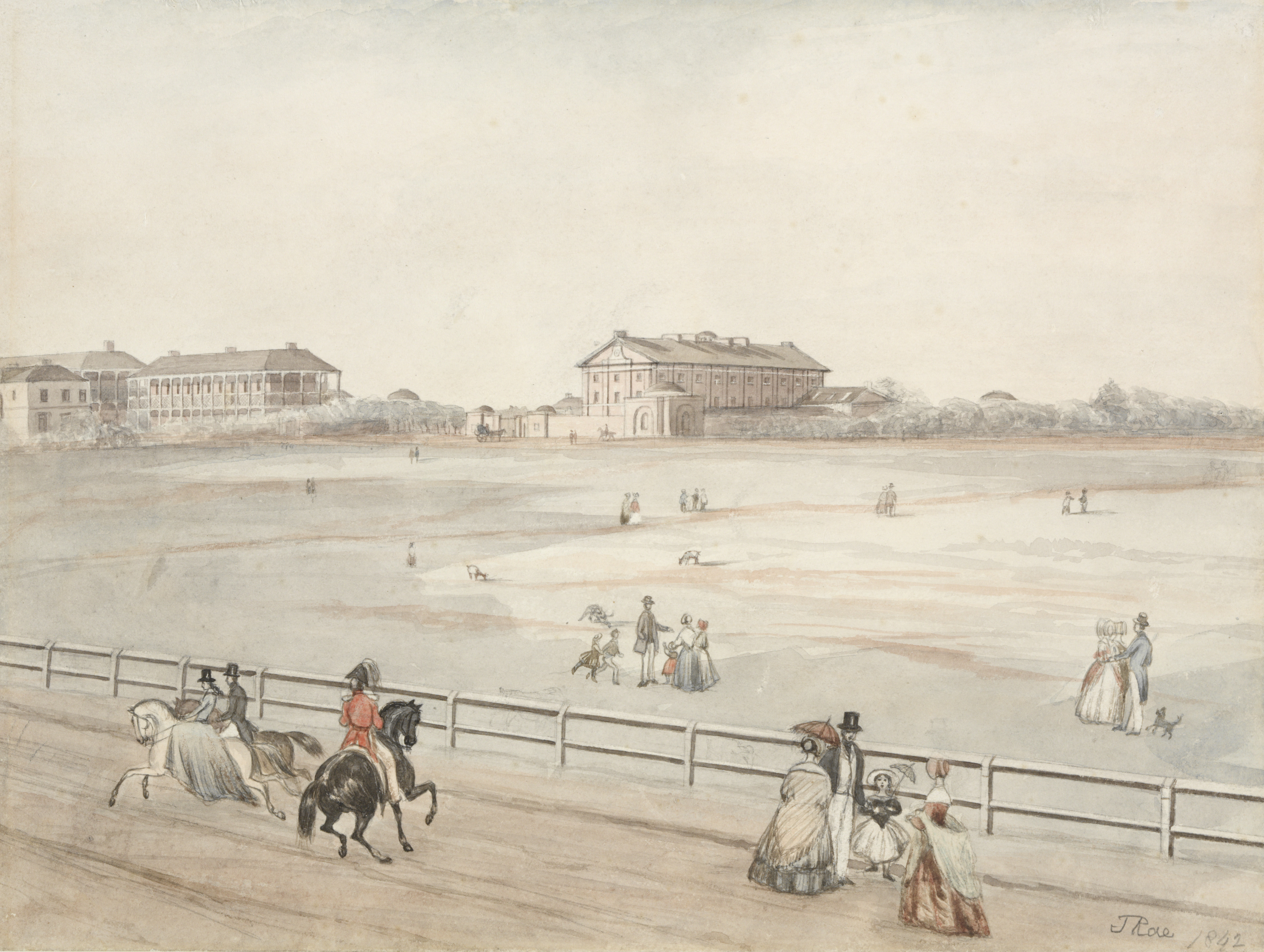
Hyde Park, St James Parsonage, Dispensary (afterwards the Sydney Mint) and Convict Barracks, Sydney, 1842

Model of the South Wing of the General Hospital

In 1811, Governor Lachlan Macquarie commenced planning for a new general hospital in Sydney which was to be his first major public building. The contractors were paid with 45,000 gallons of rum hence the name Rum Hospital. Construction was completed in 1816.

Its design is loosely based on ancient Greek architecture with its two tiers of columns made of cedar timber in the style of Doric mouldings. The columns are angled inwards creating an optical illusion imitating the Parthenon in Athens, Greece.

A dispensary opened in 1842 replacing the south wing after which the rest of the site was used as a military hospital until 1854. Governor Macquarie signed an agreement with Garnham Blaxcell, Alexander Riley and D'Arcy Wentworth to build a new convict hospital in November 1810. In return, the three gentlemen received the monopoly on the purchase of spirits for three years. As a result, the building became known as the Rum Hospital.

While the architect is unknown, the inspiration for the form of the buildings is thought to have come from Macquarie's time in India, especially the Madras Government House. The hospital, however, is constructed to the standard institutional army plan of the time – as seen at Victoria Barracks. The hospital was originally constructed with three wings, the northern wing is now part of Parliament House, the central wing has been demolished and the southern wing became the Mint.

The foundation stone was laid almost a year later, in October 1811, but the hospital was not ready for patients until March 1816. This was largely due to the constant inquiries into claims of poor quality materials and construction. Henry Kitchen wrote to Commissioner Bigge "that one would really imagine that they had been built for the very purpose of exhibiting a striking effect which such a structure would produce when in ruins". Architect Francis Greenway also criticised the buildings, drawing up plans to strengthen the roof. Greenway's official report on the workmanship found that the joints in the structural beams were weak, the foundations poor, that corners had been cut during construction, there was rotting stonework and dry rot in the timbers. Even though Macquarie ordered the contractors to remedy these faults, many more did not come to light until the restoration works of the 1980s. Despite all this, it is the oldest extant building in central Sydney.

Commissioner Bigge's main complaint, however, was regarding the size and grandeur of the buildings, rather than anything else. These may have been justified in the early years of its existence as the hospital could not be sustained on such a large scale. As a result, other Government agencies occupied various sections – the Legislative Council moved into the Principal Surgeon's Quarters in 1829, pushing the Principal Surgeon out by 1848. This wing today forms the northern facade of Parliament House. Other rooms were given over to the Principal Supervisor of Convicts and Sydney's first museum.

This early uncertainty over tenure of the buildings effected the growth of the Sydney Infirmary and Dispensary, as it was known from 1844 until 1881, when it became Sydney Hospital. The southern wing was first used for the treatment of convict patients and also housed the assistant surgeons and the medical store. From late-1843 until 1848 the building was used by the Dispensary. The Dispensary was created in 1826, occupying a variety of buildings around the city before being given the southern wing. The purpose of the service was to treat, as outpatients, the free poor who could not afford medical care. In 1848 the Sydney Infirmary and Dispensary gave up the southern wing to ensure ownership of the current site of the Sydney Hospital. Little seems to have occurred with the buildings until 1853.

The Legislative Council of New South Wales had begun petitioning the British Government for the establishment of a Mint in 1851. The gold rush had brought in to circulation large amounts of unrefined gold that was threatening the official currency. The British Government finally approved the establishment of a Mint in 1853, sending equipment and twenty staff.

Captain F.C. Ward, appointed as Deputy Mint Master, designed the required buildings and stayed in England to order the equipment. C. Trickett as Superintendent of Coining, was sent to Sydney in 1853 to direct the erection of the factory buildings and machinery and to ensure adequate security. Ward, who had worked with Joseph Paxton on London's Crystal Palace, employed similar techniques in the construction of the Mint – prefabricated cast iron columns and trusses. It was Trickett who selected the site and modified Ward's plans to incorporate the southern wing of the hospital as accommodation and offices with the remaining factory buildings forming the other three sides of a quadrangle. The short southern reach consisted of Carpenter's and Fitting Shops. To the east were the coining and rolling rooms and the Superintendent's Office. Attached to this block, further to the east, was the engine and boiler rooms. The northern block consisted of the melting house, an office and a store room. The courtyard created was geometrically landscaped around a central feature. The Factory buildings necessitated the demolition of the hospitals kitchen and outbuildings. Construction of the pre-fabricated buildings was undertaken by a contingent of trained Sappers and Miners (Royal Engineers).

=== Royal Mint and the Coining Factory (1855–1926) ===
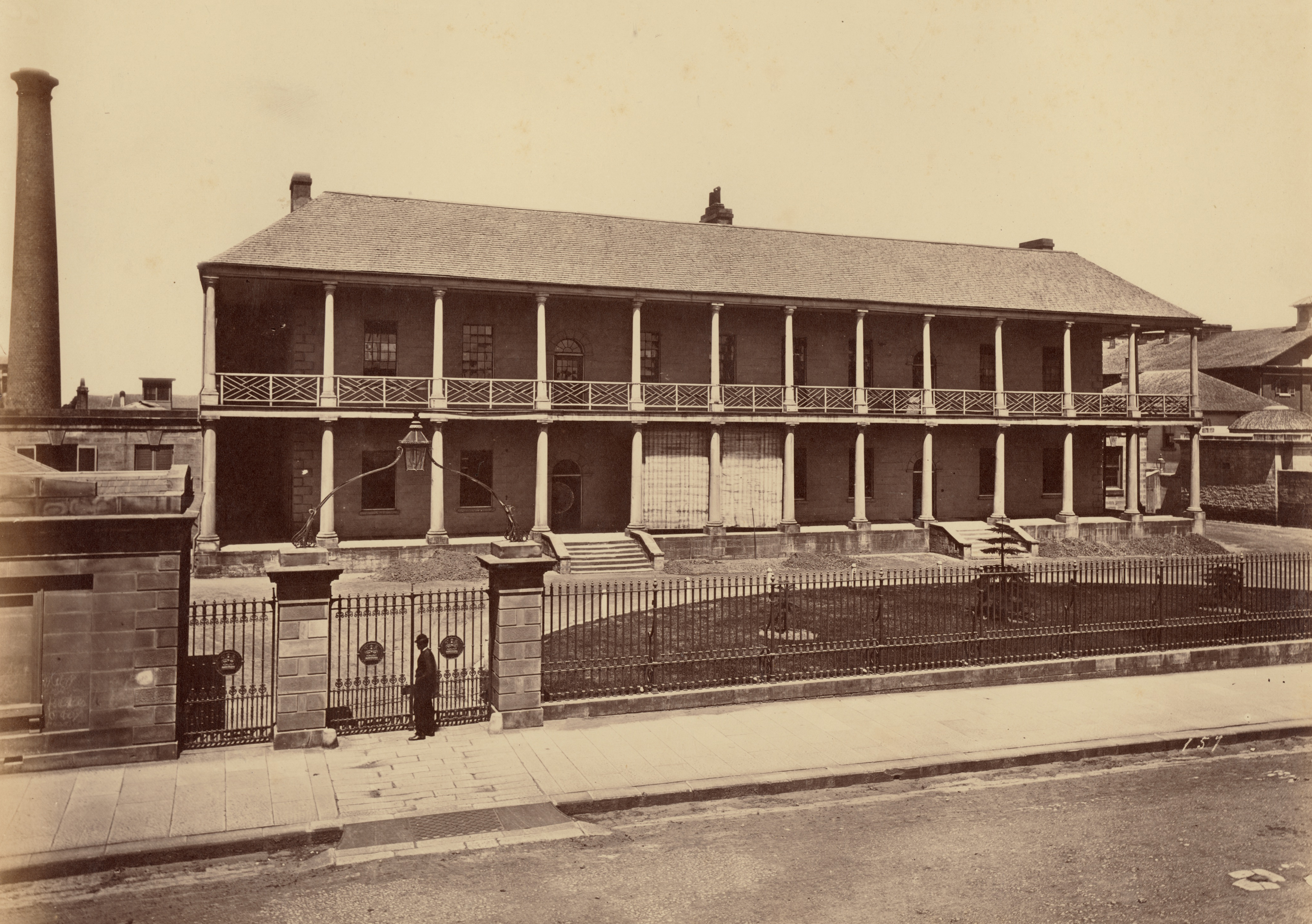
Royal Mint, Macquarie Street branch, Sydney, Australia, 1870

The British Secretary of State gave acceptance to the colonial government to establish a mint in Sydney which was to be the first branch of the Royal Mint outside England. The rear side of the mint became the coining factory. There were frequently major upgrades on the mint during the late 1800s and the early 1900s. However, by 1926, with the Melbourne and Perth Mints having much better technology and being more profitable, the mint was closed.

In 1854, 19-year-old William Stanley Jevons and Francis Bowyer Miller were appointed Assayers to the Mint. Captain Edward Wolstenholme Ward, of the Royal Engineers, was appointed Deputy Master and Chief Officer, Charles Elonis Superintendent of the Bullion Office, Joseph Trickett Superintendent of the Coining Department, Robert Huat First Clerk in the Bullion Office and Elliott Knipe Registrar and Accountant.

The Mint began operation on 14 May 1855. Now known simply as The Mint, its official title was the Royal Mint, Sydney Branch. The first five years of operation saw exports of gold fall sharply as over one million pounds worth of gold was converted into sovereign and half sovereign coins each year. In 1868 Sydney's coins were recognised as legal tender in all British colonies, but it was not until February 1886 that they were accepted in Britain. The coins were identical to those produced in Britain, except for a small mint mark.

The Sydney Branch began distribution of British bronze coins in 1868, and in 1879 began distributing Imperial silver coinage. After federation, it was one of three mints to strike the new Commonwealth coins.

Small alterations continued to be made to the buildings throughout the occupation of the Mint. In the early 1860s a new assay office and crushing room were added. In 1870–75 a series of residences were constructed facing Hospital Road. The chimney was renewed in 1889. The Mint continued to struggle with the deterioration of the buildings and in 1909 the Royal Commission for the Improvement of the City of Sydney recommended the Mint be demolished as Macquarie Street was increasingly seen as the seat of government. Federation encouraged the consolidation of minting activities in Canberra, Melbourne and Perth, the facilities in Sydney deteriorated to such an extent that the Mint was closed in January 1927, due to ageing equipment and unprofitability.

During the operation of the Mint it formed the unofficial headquarters of the Philosophical Society of New South Wales. The majority of senior staff at the Mint were founding members. With the blessing of the Society's president, Sir William Denison, also Governor of New South Wales, the Mint building and equipment was used for a number of experiments and became the heart of the scientific community in Sydney. Experiments included the investigation of the strength and elasticity of native timbers and on the combustibility of coal from Tasmania and Bellambi. The Philosophical Society also fostered other important research into weather and seismic patterns.

=== Government offices, Law Courts and the Museum (1927–present) ===
The Government Insurance Office moved into the building as soon as the Mint closed. Soon other government offices followed, including the Local Government Superannuation Board, the Electrical Contractors and Licensing Board and the Family Endowment Department. Government offices kept arriving and going for another fifty years. Gradually these buildings were being demolished.

On the departure of the Mint, a series of government departments sought office space in the buildings. Similar to the Barracks next door, with no security of tenure there was little incentive to maintain the buildings and, instead fibro buildings filled all available spaces to meet the requirements of the Family Endowment Department (1927–1940), State Headquarters of National Emergency Service (1940-1950s), Housing Commission of NSW (mid 1940s) and the Land Tax Office (mid 1940s). The Court Reporting Branch, District Courts and Parliamentary Library moved in during the 1950s. Fibro-lined courtrooms were created within the former Coining Factory for use by them.

In the 1930s with an increasing use of the motor car, and demand for parking spaces, the Mint's Macquarie Street gates were removed, a common fate for the gates of public buildings at the time. They were eventually acquired by Barker College at Hornsby in 1937 following the efforts of its Council Chairman, Sir John Butters. This was not the first time a school had acquired significant city gates: St. Joseph's College at Hunters Hill had bought the Sydney Town Hall gates and fencing when they became redundant with construction of Town Hall Railway Station.

Construction of a new District Court in 1956 had the greatest impact on the Factory buildings. Offices replaced the residences on Hospital Road, the Assay office and stores, as well as the eastern perimeter wall. In 1968 the quartz crushing room and associated shed, melting room and rolling room were also demolished to create a car park.

Restoration of the buildings, announced in 1975, were undertaken in 1977–79, with the intended purpose of utilising at least the Mint as a Museum. In 1982 the Mint opened as a branch of the Museum of Applied Arts and Sciences. It was expected that law courts would be established after the demolitions, however, activists successfully led a campaign in 1979 to preserve the Mint buildings as well as Hyde Park Barracks. The Premier of New South Wales, Neville Wran, announced that the Mint would come under control of the Museum of Applied Arts and Sciences. The museum closed down in 1997 and the building's ownership was transferred to the Historic Houses Trust.

The Mint was recently named as one of 30 projects that have reshaped the built environment since 1978. "The refurbishment project is an example of the Integration of services systems (by Steensen Varming ), to provide a modern, functional headquarters while minimising the impact on the heritage and archaeological fabric of a site."

In the 1980s an attempt was made to purchase the original gates back from Barker College, but they were by now firmly part of the college's history. Instead, copies of the gates were cast in iron for reinstatement at the Mint. This reconstruction came more than 40 years following their initial removal. It inspired restoration of similar entry gates at Trickett's cottage, "Banksia" in Double Bay, to introduce a new entrance and gates sympathetic to the house's style. Joseph Trickett worked as an engineer at the Sydney Royal Mint in 1855 and "Banksia" was built at the same time as the Sydney Mint building. The moulds used in the 1980s to reconstruct decorative parts of the gates of the Mint in Macquarie Street were located and re-used to cast decorative parts of 'Banksia's new gates, not only stylistically appropriate, but one in which the original owner Trickett himself would have participated.

In 1998 ownership of the site was transferred to the Historic Houses Trust, who continued to operate a small museum, plus a cafe. In 2004 restoration and construction was undertaken to enable the HHT to use the site as a Head Office. The former Coining Factory was sympathetically remodelled into offices and the Superintendent's Office to hold the Caroline Simpson Library and Research Collection. A new theatrette and foyer were also added. The work was overseen by architect Richard Francis-Jones, of FJMT Architects; Clive Lucas Stapleton and Partners as conservation architects and Godden Mackay Logan as archaeologists.

In July 2016 the Mint celebrated its 200th anniversary of continuous civic function with a symposium "A future for the past" as part of a programme of events.

== Description ==
There are four structures relating to the current Mint curtilage. Located at the front of the allotment, facing Macquarie Street, is a wing of the original Rum Hospital. Originally, the Mint buildings were constructed behind the hospital to form a courtyard. The building on the northern boundary, which had been demolished has recently been replaced by the foyer to the new theatrette in the eastern range.

=== Hospital Wing ===
The original Rum Hospital is a two-storey sandstone structure with a double-tier verandah around northern, western and southern sides. Sandstone columns supporting the verandah and timber roof shingles are replacements, as is the "Chinoiserie" timber lattice balustrade on the upper verandah. The verandah has been enclosed on the eastern side to form toilet and washrooms on ground floor and bathroom and kitchen on the first floor, for what was the Deputy Mint Master's residence.

Internally, the main building is divided into seven spaces on the ground floor and six on the first floor. Two of these are stairwells with associated hall/lobby, located one third from both the northern and southern ends.

Attached to the south-east corner is a one-storey rectangular room with a bay window facing Macquarie Street, formerly the Library for the Deputy Mint Master's residence, now part of the Historic Houses Trust office space.

=== Coining Factory ===
The Coining Factory buildings extend in a rough L from the former Library to form a courtyard with the Rum Hospital. The structure is iron-framed, with a sandstone-facade and corrugated iron roof. On the southern boundary, separated from the former Library by a covered breezeway is a one-storey building, originally the fitting shops and carpenters' workshops, now security centre and plant rooms for air-conditioning. The eastern reach of the quadrangle, the former Factory, has been renovated into offices for use by Historic Houses Trust staff. Works also included the construction of a theatrette and facilities in the north-eastern corner, forming an extension of the eastern quadrangle boundary. Central to the northern boundary, with covered breezeways on either side, a foyer/gallery completes the new works. The new sections are constructed of steel and glass box protected by cedar louvres and boarding, designed to mirror the Superintendent's Office. The theatrette allows an opportunity to view the eastern elevation of the hospital in the context of Sydney's skyline.

The central courtyard has been landscaped with a raised grass area, highlighted by a single tree in the south-east corner.

=== Archaeology ===
Carol Powell, who was employed to compile archival information relating to the Mint and Hyde Park Barracks, also undertook the recording of archaeological deposits exposed by the renovation works between 1977 and 1979. Like the Hyde Park Barracks, it became apparent that the deposits were larger and more intact than expected and required a dedicated archaeologist. Wendy Thorp undertook test excavations during 1980, which focused on three areas. The first of these were cellars located under the hospital, probably dug following construction and filled between 1854 and 1868 when the premise was converted into the Mint. The second focus was on the courtyard, where the hospital's kitchen had been located. The third and final area of investigation was the under and between floor spaces in the hospital building. Unlike the Hyde Park Barracks these spaces were barren, having been cleaned out in the mid-19th century and again when the Mint was moved to Canberra.

Patricia Burritt's Stage II excavations revealed further cellars under the eastern verandah, which were probably filled at a later date than the first set. In the courtyard some evidence was found of the foundations of the hospital kitchen, along with the base of the 19th century fountain and post-Mint additions. No evidence was found of the hospital's outbuildings adjacent to Hyde Park Barracks, or of the southern industrial buildings. Excavation was limited, in comparison to the Hyde Park Barracks, as minimal documentary evidence was available to direct the location of trenches.

=== Caroline Simpson Library ===
The Caroline Simpson Library is a specialised research library run by Museums of History NSW and open to the public. Its collection includes a wide range of formats relating to the history of house and garden design, interior furnishings, and domestic life in New South Wales. Apart from the various types of published material and manuscripts, the collection also includes wall and floor coverings, garden ornaments, and soft furnishings.

== Heritage listing ==
The Mint is of State significance as evidence of two important phases in New South Wales history – the development of the Colony under Governor Macquarie and its progress towards independence. The Rum Hospital, built between 1811 and 1816, is evidence of early colonial architecture and building techniques, much of the original fabric and form of the building has been retained. The buildings demonstrate the evolution and adaptation of architectural forms to Australia, including colonial army buildings. The Coining Factory is an early surviving example of a pre-fabricated cast-iron structure in New South Wales. The site became the Royal Mint, Sydney Branch and began coining in 1855 as the first mint to be established in a British colony. The place is important as one of the three Australian mints at which the Commonwealth government minted the first Australian coins following the federation of the Australian colonies. The minting of Australian coins at the Sydney Mint commenced in 1916 and continued until the closure of the building as a mint in 1927. The Mint is uncommon evidence for manufacturing during the mid 19th century in central Sydney. The site retained its importance as District Courts and Government offices, before becoming a museum. The site is also significant for the archaeological potential to reveal further information about the Rum Hospital and the minting process during the 19th and early 20th century.

Hyde Park Barracks, Sydney (inclusive of the Sydney Mint), was listed on the New South Wales State Heritage Register on 2 April 1999 having satisfied the following criteria.

The place is important in demonstrating the course, or pattern, of cultural or natural history in New South Wales.

There is a diversity of structures which document the evolution of the Hyde Park Barracks complex from the late Georgian era to modern times: from the era of convict cell blocks and enclosed penal institutions, through to judicial courts and offices and present-day museum. It contains two fig trees on Macquarie Street which are symbolic of a number of significant town planning schemes throughout the 19th century, such as the creation of Chancery Square, (now known as Queen's Square). Within the complex are structures associated with the first purpose-built government institution for the housing of convicts. It is associated with the development of the legal system in NSW being the location of the first meeting in 1830 of the bench of magistrates for the Court of General Sessions and the first location of the Metropolitan District Court established under the District Courts Act, 1958. It is associated with other historic landmarks in the area such as the former Rum Hospital, St James' Church, Hyde Park, the Domain, St Mary's Cathedral and Macquarie Street.

The place is important in demonstrating aesthetic characteristics and/or a high degree of creative or technical achievement in New South Wales.

It contains elements such as the perimeter walls, parts of the two gate lodges, one former pavilion and parts of another, some external and probably internal walls on the northern range of buildings which are associated with the convict architect Francis Greenway's design. Together with the central barracks building, the place possesses a rich architectural history from the earliest days of European settlement in Australia.

The place has a strong or special association with a particular community or cultural group in New South Wales for social, cultural or spiritual reasons.

It contains a museum which is a centre of tourist and cultural activity in Sydney.

The place has potential to yield information that will contribute to an understanding of the cultural or natural history of New South Wales.

The site contains areas of potential archaeological significance which are likely to provide significant insight into the establishment of the place and its subsequent developmental history.

The place possesses uncommon, rare or endangered aspects of the cultural or natural history of New South Wales.

It is the oldest example of a walled penal institution in Australia. The barracks provide rare evidence of the standards and skills of building practice, architectural design and urban planning in early 19th century Sydney
