= Museums of History NSW =

Heritage organisation in Australia

- Museums of History NSW logo

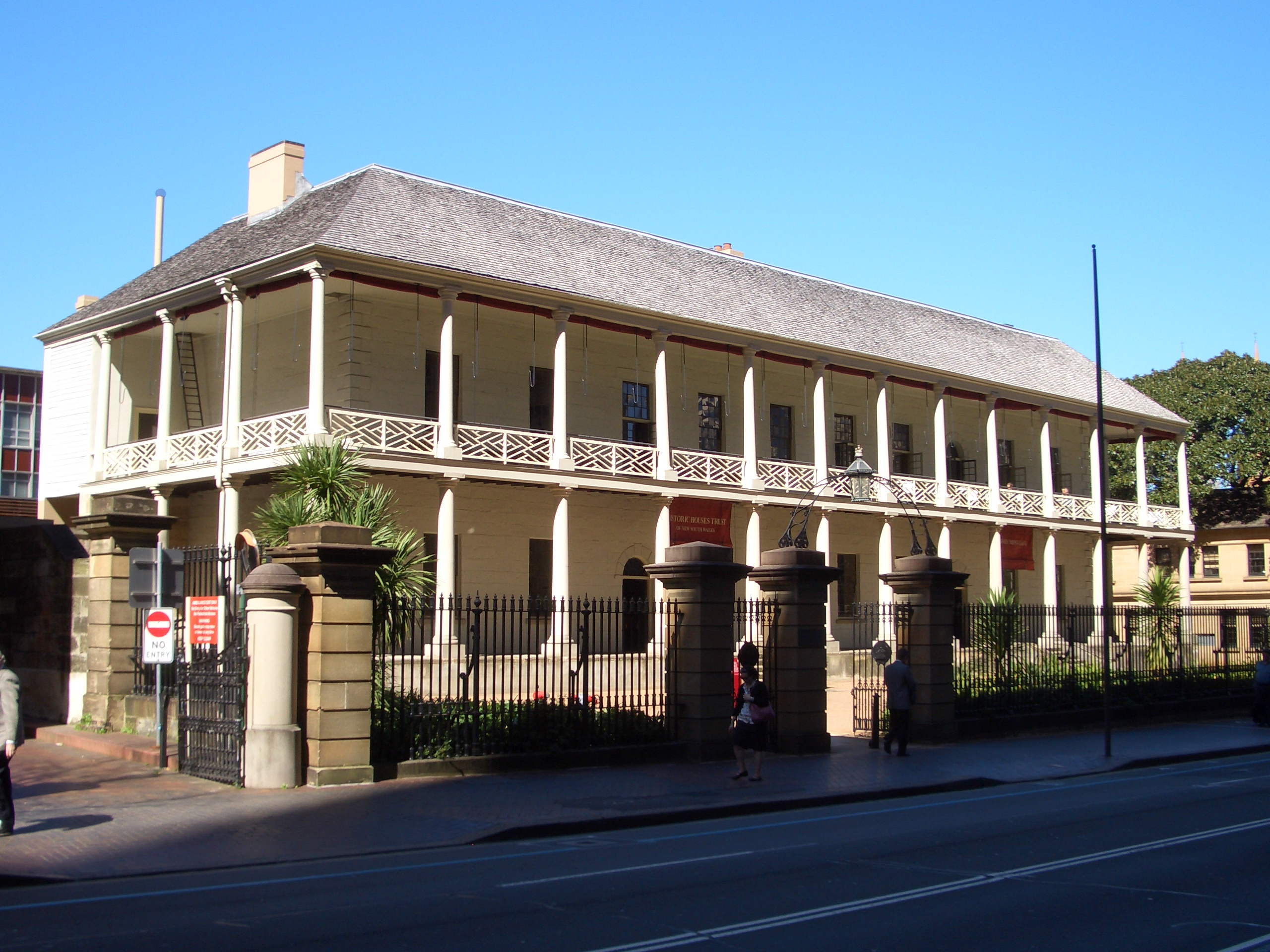
- The Mint – Headquarters of MHNSW

Agency overview
- Formed: 2022
- Preceding agency: Sydney Living Museums
- Jurisdiction: New South Wales
- Headquarters: The Mint, 10 Macquarie Street, Sydney, Australia
- Employees: 354 (2024)
- Annual budget: A$73.6 million
- Minister responsible: John Graham, Minister for the Arts
- Agency executives: Bob Carr, Chair; Loretta Di Mento, Deputy Chair; Annette Pitman, Chief Executive Officer; Scott Ellis, Chief Operating Officer; Martyn Killion, Director, Collections and Executive Director, State Records NSW; Danielle Toga, Director, Corporate Services; Ben Alexander, Director, Commercial Services; Kathryn Natoli, Director, Strategy & External Relations; Rebecca Bushby, Director, Programming, Production & Audience
- Parent department: Department of Enterprise, Investment and Trade
- Parent agency: Create NSW
- Child agencies: State Records NSW; Government Records Repository
- Key documents: Museums of History NSW Act 2022; State Records Act 1998
- Website: mhnsw.au

Museums of History NSW (MHNSW) is a statutory body of the Government of New South Wales that is responsible for historic sites, state collections, and archives in the state of New South Wales, Australia. In 2023, the former State Archives and Records Authority was merged with Sydney Living Museums (formerly known as Historic Houses Trust of New South Wales) to form MHNSW. MHNSW headquarters are in The Mint, and sites run by the organisation include various houses, gardens, parklands, and urban spaces across New South Wales.

== History ==
The Historic Houses Trust was established under the Historic Houses Trust Act 1980 and originally charged with the running of Elizabeth Bay House and Vaucluse House. The Trust expanded to care for 12 houses, gardens, and museums in New South Wales. As of 2016 the Trust was caring for over 48,000 catalogued objects across all of the sites.

In 2013, the Historic Houses Trust launched its new identity as Sydney Living Museums to refresh and unify its diverse range of properties and highlight its role and relevance for current and future generations.

In 2023, (Note: Most of the provisions of the Museums of History NSW Act 2022 came into force on 31 December 2022) Sydney Living Museums merged with the State Archives and Records Authority to form Museums of History NSW.

== Events ==
Museums of History NSW organises the annual Sydney Open event in which visitors explore modern and old buildings in the Sydney CBD. Sydney Open allows visitors access to parts of buildings that they would not otherwise be able to see. In 2026, a satellite event named Parramatta Open launched, expanding the experience to Parramatta rather than just the CBD.

== Sites ==
Museums of History NSW currently manages the following properties:

Property	Image	Acquired/ assumed management	Date opened	Status
The Mint, Macquarie Street, Sydney		1998	1998 and 2004	Headquarters and the Caroline Simpson Library
Elizabeth Bay House, Onslow Avenue, Elizabeth Bay		1980	1980	Museum
Elizabeth Farm, Alice Street, Rosehill		1984	1984	Museum
Hyde Park Barracks, Macquarie Street, Sydney		1990	1991	Museum
Justice and Police Museum, Circular Quay, Sydney		1990	1991	Museum
Meroogal, Cnr West and Worrigee Streets, Nowra		1985	1988	Museum
Museum of Sydney, Corner Philip and Bridge Streets, Sydney		1990	1995	Museum
Rouse Hill Estate, Rouse Hill		1987	1999	Museum
Rose Seidler House, Clissold Road, Wahroonga		1988	1991	Museum
Susannah Place, The Rocks, Sydney		1990	1993	Museum
Vaucluse House, Wentworth Road, Vaucluse		1980	1980	Museum

== See also ==
- National Trust of Australia (New South Wales)
