= Justice and Police Museum =

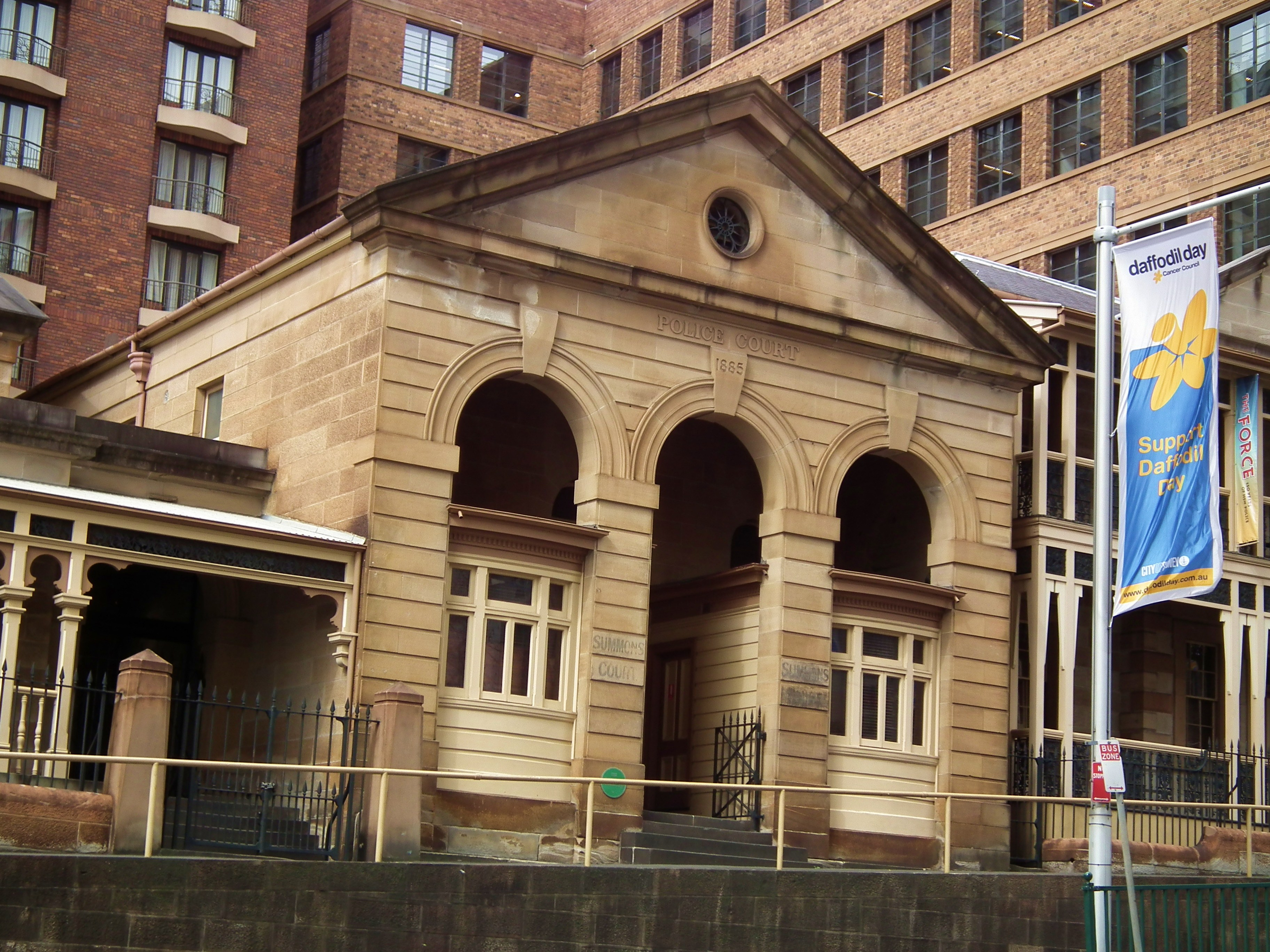
- Phillip Street frontage of the museum

- Location in Greater Sydney
- Former name: Water Police Court; Phillip Street Police Station; Water Police Station; Law Courts; Traffic Court
- Location: 4–8 Phillip Street, Sydney central business district, New South Wales, Australia
- Coordinates: 33°51′44″S 151°12′44″E
- Type: Living history museum
- Website: sydneylivingmuseums.com.au/justice-police-museum

History
- Built: 1854–1886

Site notes
- Architects: Edmund Blacket; Alexander Dawson; James Barnet
- Architectural style: Australian classic revival
- Owner: Department of Communities and Justice

New South Wales Heritage Register
- Official name: Justice and Police Museum; Police Station & Law Courts (former); Traffic Court
- Type: State heritage (built)
- Criteria: a., c., d., e.
- Designated: 2 April 1999
- Reference no.: 673
- Type: Police station
- Category: Law Enforcement

The Justice and Police Museum is a heritage-listed former water police station, offices and courthouse and now justice and police museum located at 4–8 Phillip Street on the corner of Albert Street, in the Sydney central business district, New South Wales, Australia. It was designed by Edmund Blacket, Alexander Dawson and James Barnet and built from 1854 to 1886. It is also known as Police Station & Law Courts (former) and Traffic Court. The property is owned by the Department of Communities and Justice.

== History ==
=== Pre 1856 ===
In 1851 the Governor General approved the Colonial Architect's plan for a new Water Police Office. By November the site had been chosen. In 1853 work began on quarrying the sandstone at Bennelong Point for the Water Police Office but work was delayed because of high prices and a labour shortage caused by the gold rushes. A sum of £4,000 was allocated in 1854 for the construction of the Water Police Station on Phillip Street to the south of the Water Police Office.

The new Water Police Office on the eastern side of Circular Quay was completed. The building, designed by Edmund Blacket, consisted of a main court and four adjoining offices. In April the buildings were occupied by the Water Police Magistrate, Hutchinson Hothersal Brown, and court staff consisting of a Clerk of Petty Sessions and a second clerk. Cases heard in the court related to the workings of the Harbour Regulations Act and the Act for Establishing a Water Police. In May permission was granted for the Steam Navigation and Pilot Boards to take possession of one room.

The Water Police moved from Cadman's Wharf to the Water Police Station located in Phillip Street to the south of the Water Police Office. It was designed by Colonial Architect Alexander Dawson and construction commenced in 1857. The building consisted of a ground floor with Charge Room, adjoining offices, cells to the rear, a kitchen, store room and exercise yard. Upstairs was a barracks providing accommodation for four water policemen and their families. It also contained a kitchen and wash house. The original police station design was based on stations at Darlinghurst, Newtown and Balmain. The building was intended to accommodate six cells and a lock-up keeper. However, due to financial constraints and delays caused by labour shortages during the Gold Rush period, the station was completed as a modest two-storey building.

The second court, designed by Colonial Architect James Barnet, was completed during this period. It consisted of a court room and two Magistrates Offices at the rear. While it functioned as a Summons Court hearing cases of petty crime, the Blacket Court became a Charge Court. This period witnessed a growth of police and court operations. The buildings were affected by a number of alterations and additions caused by changes to the nature of the courts and the business they attracted.

In 1913 the Water Police who lived at the station were removed to their new accommodation on the north-western side of the Quay at Dawes Point, providing two locations for their activities. The station became known as the Phillip Street Police Station from this time although it was still often referred to as the Water Police Station. The activities of the station were incorporated more fully into the Metropolitan Policing District, becoming the head station for Number 4 Division by 1933. It seems that the Water Police held the two locations at least until this time, when the split between the metropolitan (essentially foot) duties associated with the Station and the Water Patrol had become more definite. However, the adjacent court continued to be referred to as the Water Bench until late 1940. In 1917 the Police Traffic Branch moved into offices at the Water Police Court and remained there until 1924. In 1918 the Water Police Court closed for alterations and was reopened in 1924. By 1924 special arrangements had been made for hearing traffic offences in the Water Police Court in addition to those concerning shipping, military trainees and children. From 1926 the courts became known as Traffic Courts 1 and 2 for hearing all traffic and parking offences in the Sydney district. They also continued to hear cases relevant to shipping and cases arising from Water Police activity.

The courts were vacated by court staff, providing valuable space for the police in the adjoining station in late 1979.

Court functions, 1890–1924

- 1890s – Licensing Court
- 1917–1924 – Traffic Office
- 1918 – Fair Rents Court
- 1919–1933 – Small Debts Court
- 1924–1980 – Traffic Court

Other occupants of Water Police Courts, 1890–1918

- 1890–1933 – Clerk of petty Sessions and Chamber Magistrate
- 1890–1897 – Stipendiary Magistrate
- 1890–1918 – Chief Clerk
- 1890–1904 – Accountant
- 1890–1902 – Clerks
- 1891–1902 – Bailiff of the Small Debts Court
- 1894–1902 – Messenger
- 1914–1918 – Chief Industrial Magistrate

The site is run by Sydney Living Museums (formerly the Historic Houses Trust of NSW) as a Police & Justice museum. The Friends of the Historic Houses Trust have been responsible for fundraising through interpretive tours and events to acquire the Neville]Locker collection of convict artefacts for Hyde Park Barracks and the Police & Justice Museum.

== Description ==
The Justice and Police Museum comprises two main elements, the Museum Buildings and the Museum Collection.

=== The museum buildings ===
These are two 19th-century courthouses and a police station built on the corner of Phillip and Albert Streets at the eastern end of Circular Quay for use by the Sydney Water Police, the Water Police Magistrate and the metropolitan police.

- 1856 – Court House – 4 Phillip Street
- 1858 – Police Station – 8 Phillip Street
- 1886 – Court House – 6 Phillip Street

The 1856 Blacket Court building area

The Blacket Court building area is a single storey classic revival sandstone building with an arched colonnaded portico roofed with a Doric pediment. The facades comprises timber framed windows and doors with the main entrance to the northern wall enclosed with curved timber and glass walling.

The Court House consists of five smaller roof areas. These include the main gabled or pedimented roof area to the court room, with two lower hipped roof areas on each side of the main court room area. The building area also includes a flat roof area to the rear or south end of the court which extends over a sandstone paved corridor between the Blacket Court Building (1856) and the Barnet Court Building (1886). The western wing has a lean-to verandah roof extending along the Phillip Street facade. The main gabled ended roof and the two hipped roof areas are covered in slate with lead hip and ridge flashings. The flat roof area at the rear is covered in copper and contains three glazed skylights with steel grilles. The western lean-to verandah roof is covered with corrugated steel "colourbond" roofing.

There are four chimneys located on the main courtroom roof area.

The 1886 Barnet Court building area

The Barnet Court building area is a single storey sandstone building erected at the rear of the Blacket Court Room as an extension. It consists of an arched colonnaded portico, also roofed with a pediment to match the detail of the earlier Blacket Court Building. The main front entrance portico is enclosed with a curved timber and glass walling, The main roof area is gabled with slate roofing and the stair roof comprises a lean-to corrugated steel "colourbond" roof sheeting.

The 1858 Police Station Area

The Police Station Area is a two-storey Pyrmont sandstone building of simple Classical style with a pediment over the central section of the front facade. It has a T-shaped hipped roof with lead ridge and flashings and slate tiles. The windows are timber framed. The front facade to Phillip Street has a metal pike fence and gate on a low sandstone wall extending the full extent of the facade.

=== Museum collection ===
The collection is general and largely police-based in content. Its nucleus is formed from the 1910 Police Museum teaching collection of criminal implements. It contains few objects relating to the specific theme of the Water Police but covers a broader cross section of policing activities and law related themes. The collection includes historical artefacts, photographs and documents. It is particularly strong in firearms of the colonial period and forensic evidence from famous crimes.

=== Condition ===
As at 18 September 1997, physical condition is good. Archaeological potential is low.

=== Modifications and dates ===
- 1862 – Alterations to Clerk of Petty Sessions Office and the Guard Room. Partitions removed.
- 1865 – Water Police Station supplied with gas lighting
- 1875–76 – Two stone cells added to the rear of the Water Police Station
- 1879 – A Court Keepers's cottage constructed from timber on the eastern side of the Water Police Court.
- 1885–86 – Second courthouse designed and completed by Colonial Architect James Barnet, Colonial Architect.
- 1897–99 – Office on northern end of Phillip Street frontage in Water Police Court converted into a courtroom.
- 1899–1900 – Timber and glass witness waiting rooms designed by Colonial Architect Walter Liberty Vernon and installed in the entrances to both courthouses.
- 1903 – Alterations and additions to officers quarters in the Water Police Station.
- 1912 – Prisoners dock in Court Number 1 altered.
- 1924–28 – Further subdivision of offices to create space
- 1930s – Toilets in glazed brick constructed at rear of Police Station
- 1933 – Phillip Street frontage of the Water Police Court altered to house a fibro cement infill and new waiting room. Internal work on ground floor.
- 1941 – Police Station porch altered
- c. 1941 – Reinforced concrete air raid shelter constructed on southern end of porch.
- 1947–48 – Levels of Phillip and Albert Street lowered. External stairs, an elevated footpath and sandstone retaining walls were constructed to provide public access and building support.
- 1986–1990 – Alterations, additions and reconstruction.

== In popular culture ==
The museum courthouse appeared in SBS documentary series The Jury: Death on the Staircase, based on the British series The Jury: Murder Trial, profiling the jury deliberation process during a re-enactment of a real manslaughter case.

== Heritage listing ==
As at 26 September 1997, The buildings symbolically represent power and privilege. Architecturally and culturally they evoke a system of social control and relate to a specific power relationship. The site's proximity to the waters of Sydney Cove; its close and long continuing association with the colony and its classical architectural syntax and indeed, endearingly human scale, provides an important foil to multi-storeyed buildings and Circular Quay.

Justice and Police Museum was listed on the New South Wales State Heritage Register on 2 April 1999 having satisfied the following criteria.

The place is important in demonstrating the course, or pattern, of cultural or natural history in New South Wales.

The buildings were the headquarters of the Water Police, one of the earliest policing bodies in New South Wales, whose activities were closely related to Sydney's growth as a maritime and commercial centre. The complex of buildings reflects the work of four government architects over 48 years. The buildings have a continuous association with different law and policing functions in the inner metropolitan district. In their present form they demonstrate the architectural response to demands imposed by policing trends in the 19th century.

The place is important in demonstrating aesthetic characteristics and/or a high degree of creative or technical achievement in New South Wales.

The buildings form part of a historic precinct within the Sydney Cove area, conspicuous for its sandstone buildings which include significant sites relating to the foundation of colonial government and administration.

The place has a strong or special association with a particular community or cultural group in New South Wales for social, cultural or spiritual reasons.

The Justice and Police Museum holds the only public collection of artefacts in NSW relating to the history of crime, law and policing.

The place has potential to yield information that will contribute to an understanding of the cultural or natural history of New South Wales.

The reconstruction as of c. 1899 of the court and police station provide a unique opportunity to demonstrate the working relationship between the two in an experiential and interactive context and manner. The museum is unique among Sydney's museums in that it can communicate the activities of the law and the police today to the public. While it may disseminate information about the aims and methods of these institutions it should maintain an independent role as a commentator and interpreter.

== See also ==
- Museum of Sydney
