= Office of Sport (New South Wales) =

Agency of the New South Wales Government

Agency overview
- Formed: 1955; 71 years ago
- Preceding Agency: NSW Sport and Recreation; New South Wales Department of Tourism, Sport and Recreation
- Type: Government agency
- Jurisdiction: New South Wales
- Headquarters: Level 3, 6B Figtree Drive, Sydney Olympic Park
- Minister responsible: The Hon. Steve Kamper MP, Minister for Sport
- Agency executive: Adam Berry, Chief Executive, Office of Sport
- Parent department: Department of Creative Industries, Tourism, Hospitality and Sport
- Website: www.sport.nsw.gov.au

The New South Wales Office of Sport, an agency of the New South Wales Government, is responsible for assisting the people of New South Wales to participate in sport and active recreation, in order to improve personal and community well being.

Administratively, the agency is a division within the Department of Creative Industries, Tourism, Hospitality and Sport. The Chief Executive of the Office of Sport is Adam Berry. The agency is responsible to the Minister for Sport, presently The Hon. Steve Kamper MP.

== History ==
The history of the agency goes back to 1955 when the New South Wales Department of Sport and Recreation was formed. In 2003 the agency was reincarnated as the New South Wales Department of Tourism, Sport and Recreation (2003 to 2006), the Department of the Arts, Sport and Recreation (2006 to 2009), Communities NSW (2009 to 2011), and Office of Communities, Sport & Recreation (2011–2014). NSW Sport and Recreation was formed in 2014.

== Branches ==
The Office of Sport is divided into three branches:

=== Commercial Services ===
As part of its commitment to the people of NSW, the Office of Sport manages ten centres in NSW, three Olympic sport venues and The Duke of Edinburgh's Award.

The Sport and Recreation Centres offer people of all ages the opportunity to participate in well-planned recreational and sporting activities in a residential environment at an economical cost. The Centres offer the following programs and services:

- School camps for government, independent and catholic schools throughout NSW (targeted at primary and high school students)
- Kids and family holiday camps – during school holidays
- Programs for under-represented and disadvantaged groups such as respite camps for disabled teens
- Active experiences and outdoor education programs for corporates and community groups.

The ten Sport and Recreation Centres are located at:

- Berry (South Coast)
- Broken Bay (Hawkesbury)
- Borambola (Riverina)
- Jindabyne (Snowy Mountains)
- Lake Ainsworth (North Coast)
- Lake Burrendong (Western NSW)
- Lake Keepit (North West NSW)
- Milson Island (Hawkesbury)
- Narrabeen (Sydney)
- Point Wolstoncroft (Hunter)

Olympic Sport Venues include:

- Sydney International Equestrian Centre (Sydney)
- Sydney International Regatta Centre (Sydney)
- Sydney International Shooting Centre (Sydney)
- Penrith Whitewater Stadium (Sydney)

=== Participation and Partnerships ===
The Participation and Partnerships branch incorporates regions, funding and performance, and industry programs.

The Office of Sport has offices in:

- Sydney (Central Region)
- Borambola near Wagga Wagga (Southern Region)
- Dubbo (Western Region)
- Lennox Head (Northern Region)
- Newcastle (Northern Region)
- Orange (Western Region)
- Ourimbah (Northern Region)
- Tamworth (Western Region)
- Wollongong (Central Region)

These offices work closely with local government, non-government agencies, community and sporting organisations to facilitate, implement and promote greater opportunities for sport and recreation in the community.

=== Policy and Strategy ===
The Policy and Strategy branch develops and provides strategic advice to the Minister, Chief Executive and Executive Director. The branch works closely with stakeholders in the sport and recreation sector, other entities within the portfolio and key government agencies including Infrastructure NSW, Destination NSW and NSW Treasury.

The branch is responsible for the development and implementation of key major projects including the NSW Stadia Strategy. The NSW Government announced in September 2015 that more than $1.6 billion will be invested in the stadia network over the next decade. $600 million has been set aside in Rebuilding NSW and the NSW Government will provide a further allocation of funding to complete the projects.

== See also ==
- NSW Institute of Sport
- List of New South Wales government agencies
