= Steensen Varming =

Engineering firm in Denmark

Steensen Varming is an engineering firm headquartered in Copenhagen, Denmark.

== History ==
It was founded by Niels Steensen and Jørgen Varming in Copenhagen, Denmark, in 1933. The firm specialised in civil, structural and building services engineering. During the 20th century, the practice grew out of Denmark and new offices were established in Australia (Steensen Varming Australia ‐ 1973), United Kingdom (Steensen Varming Mulcahy ‐ 1957) and Ireland (Varming Mulcahy Reilly Associates ‐ 1947).

Jørgen Varming was the son of a prominent Danish architect, Kristoffer Varming; Jørgen studied engineering at the University of Newcastle.

=== Sydney Opera House ===
Steensen and Varming were chosen by the Danish architect Jørn Utzon as the mechanical consulting engineers for the Sydney Opera House in Sydney in 1957. The Australian branch of Steensen & Varming Australia (later to be known as Steensen Varming) was led by Vagn Prestmark a partner from the Danish Steensen & Varming firm.

Prestmark established Steensen Varming in Australia in 1957 and the company was permanently established in Australia in 1973. Steensen & Varming was not well known in Australia prior to the Sydney Opera House, it was however well established in Europe with offices in Dublin, Belfast, London, Edinburgh and Copenhagen and employed over 500 people by 1973.

When Utzon resigned from the Sydney Opera House in 1966, Steensen & Varming continued as the mechanical consultants ultimately delivering the design, documentation, contract administration and detailed site supervision of all mechanical, hydraulic and fire protection services, including the controls and supervisory system.

Steensen Varming's most known contribution to the Sydney Opera House, was the design for the water heat pump system. The architects and engineers agreed that constructing a boiler chimney stack or a cooling tower, would not be in keeping with the design of the Opera House, which ruled out the two normal approaches for large-scale air conditioning. Steensen Varming provided the design solution in using a heat pump system, which used water from the harbour as the cooling agent.

There were three main considerations which led to the design of the Opera House air conditioning as a heat pump system, the availability of the waters of Sydney harbour as a heat sources and sink, the aesthetics and the savings that could be achieved with a water-to-water heat pump. Three pumps draw water from Circular Quay, the water is filtered to remove debris and then passes through tubes and is discharged into the harbour at the opposite side of the Opera House. Fresh water circulates between the heat exchanger shells and the shells of the condenser and evaporators of three centrifugal chillers / heat pump sets.

The design innovation and technical expertise demonstrated in this landmark project subsequently led to the awarding of other projects in Australia to the Steensen Varming practice.

The engineering construction of the Sydney Opera House was featured in a National Geographic/BBC production hosted Richard Hammond called Engineering Connections. The programme aired in Australia on 13 March 2010. Part of the documentary featured the seawater heat rejection system originally designed by Steensen Varming and assistance on this documentary was provided by Steensen Varming who acted as technical liaison to the production team.

== Australian projects ==
=== Ian Thorpe Aquatic Centre ===
Steensen Varming was the first Australian organisation to win an Award of Excellence from the International Association of Lighting Designers for the lighting of the Ian Thorpe Aquatic Centre, Sydney. The Ian Thorpe Aquatic Centre was one of the last architectural designs by the architect Harry Seidler and was completed in 2008.

=== The Mint, Historic Houses Trust Australia ===
The Sydney Mint was recently named as one of 30 projects that have reshaped the built environment since 1978. "The refurbishment project is an example of the Integration of services systems (by Steensen Varming), to provide a modern, functional headquarters while minimising the impact on the heritage and archaeological fabric of a site."
