= New South Wales Institute of Sport =

Sports training institute in Australia

- NSWIS (N-swis)

Government agency overview
- Formed: 1996
- Jurisdiction: Government of New South Wales
- Headquarters: Sydney Olympic Park, Sydney, Australia
- Government agency executives: Gary Flowers, Chair; Kevin Thompson, Chief Executive
- Parent department: Department of Creative Industries, Tourism, Hospitality and Sport
- Key document: Institute of Sport Act, 1995
- Website: www.nswis.com.au

The New South Wales Institute of Sport (NSWIS) is a high-performance-sports training institute in New South Wales, Australia. The New South Wales government agency provides coaching, performance support, and daily training environments to help targeted athletes achieve podium performances. NSWIS supports athlete welfare through career and educational assistance, aiding athletes in balancing their sports commitments with personal development.

Located at Sydney Olympic Park, the institute was established as a statutory body under the Institute of Sport Act, 1995, following a review recommending central coordination and monitoring of high-performance sports programs in New South Wales. Operations officially commenced in 1996. Over the course of 2021, the institute developed 564 athletes, across 46 sports in 18 programs. The aim of the services is to ensure that NSWIS athletes have access to coaching and sports technology while also receiving tailored support to help balance their sporting commitments with personal development and a career.

The agency is responsible to the Minister for Sport. Ultimately, the minister is responsible to the Parliament of New South Wales.

== Structure ==
The institute offers support to athletes across the following nine areas:

- Athlete wellbeing and engagement
- Biomechanics
- Coaching
- Corporate and communications
- Nutrition
- Performance analysis
- Performance health
- Performance psychology
- Physiology
- Research
- Sports management
- Strength and conditioning

Under the institute's Mobile/Regional program, the NSWIS offers support services to NSWIS athletes in their home environment, enabling them to pursue their sporting careers with minimal disruption to their family, education and employment.

The institute's principal partner was ClubsNSW, who provided A$1 million a year in sponsorship.

== Sports ==
The NSWIS runs programs in a number of sports with the objective of preparing young athletes for national and international competition. As of January 2022, programs are run in the following sports:

- Athletics, including wheelchair track & road
- Basketball and wheelchair basketball
- Canoeing
- Cycling
- Diving
- Field hockey
- Rowing
- Sailing
- Surfing
- Swimming
- Triathlon
- Water polo
- Winter sports

== See also ==
- Football NSW National Training Centre
