= NSW State Archives Collection =

Archives management authority

The NSW State Archives Collection is an agency of the New South Wales Government that archives and manages the records of the history of the Government of New South Wales in Australia and is part of Museums of History NSW. Prior to 2022, it was a standalone authority known as the State Archives and Records Authority of New South Wales (commonly known as State Archives and Records NSW). It can trace its history back to the establishment of the office of Colonial Secretary and Registrar of the Records of New South Wales in 1821. However, in the early years of the Colony's history, little attention was paid to the management and preservation of non-current public records. This was mainly because the government of the day was fully focussed on the administration of the convict system, law and order, immigration and land settlement. Documents which were not required for the day-to-day running of the government were usually neglected or were destroyed.

== Background ==
It was not until the late nineteenth century, with the approach of the Centenary of the Colony, that an awareness of the value of public archives as fundamental sources for Australian history was recorded. This interest led to the appointment of an Archivist of New South Wales, and the publication of Historical Records of New South Wales. At the time the term 'archives' was used broadly to include manuscripts, pictorial material and maps from a wide range of private sources as well as to denote non-current official records.

The Trustees of the Public Library of New South Wales were active from about 1870 in the preservation of books and manuscripts relating to Australia, but it was the opening of the Mitchell Library in 1910 that provided the first real stimulus to action in the area of public records. At the request of the acting Premier and the Attorney General, The Trustees of the Public Library prepared a report on the present and future dangers of the neglect of State records, which included recommendations on the establishment of an Archives Department in the Public Library Building.

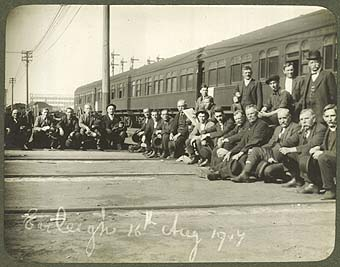
Locomotive drivers from the Eveleigh workshop during the 1917 strike. This was a great period of change for New South Wales.

This proposal lapsed but during the period 1911–1918, some action was taken towards establishing an archives office. A number of instructions were issued by both the Premier and the Public Service Board, advising departments to transfer non-current records considered to be of historical value, to the Mitchell Library. On the authority of these instructions, the Trustees of the Public Library became in effect, the archival authority for the State, and much work was done in the Mitchell Library to collect and preserve NSW State archives.

In November 1953, an Archives Department was established within the Public Library of New South Wales (subsequently State Library of New South Wales) by which time there was an estimated 2,300 metres of archives in the custody of the Mitchell Library.

The Archives Department in the period following 1953 adapted and put into practice recognised archival principles and procedures, both in the management of State archives in the custody of the Trustees and in the management of the Government Records Repository, which was established in 1955. The management of the repository was overseen by the Public Service Board.

The foundations for establishing a statutory authority to administer official archives in New South Wales had been well laid by the mid 1950s and preparatory work on Archives legislation began in 1955.

== Archives Act 1960 ==
In September 1960, the Archives Bill was approved by Cabinet. It was introduced into the Legislative Assembly in October and in November the Archives Act, No 46 of 1960, received Royal Assent. The Act was proclaimed to commence of the first day of June 1961. A new era in the management of public records in New South Wales had begun.

The Act stated that the "Archives Authority of New South Wales shall undertake the preservation, storage and arrangement, repair, cataloguing and calendaring, and have the custody and control, of the State archives and shall have the management of the Archives Office of New South Wales". The Archives Authority was also made responsible for the management of the New South Wales Government Records Repository and the Records Management Office of New South Wales.

== Archives Authority ==
The Archives Authority consisted of nine members, appointed by the Governor of New South Wales from the judiciary, legislature, universities and the New South Wales Public Service. The first Chairman of the Authority was H.S. Wyndham CBE, MA, Ed D. Dip Ed and the Principal Archivist was Gordon D. Richardson. The work of the Authority mainly related to the examination of recommendations for the retention and disposal of public records.

== Archives and Records Management Offices ==
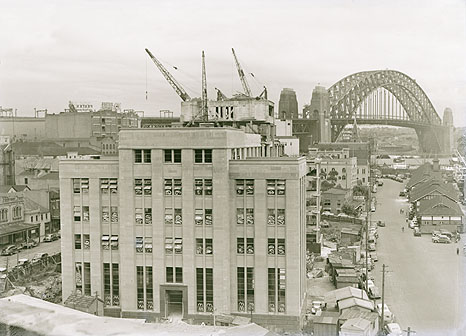
This image is pre-1952 and shows the construction of The Maritime Services Building (now the Museum of Contemporary Art). The location of the Records Management Office in 1978 was on a street parallel to this building.

The Archives Office was housed in extensions to the Public Library of New South Wales, which had been commenced in 1959 and included three floors specifically designed to accommodate the new office. In 1976 the Archives Office became administratively separate from the Public Library of New South Wales and in late 1978 moved, with the Records Management Office to a new purpose built archives building at 2 Globe Street, The Rocks.

== Challenges for the Archives Office of New South Wales ==
In the 1980s, challenges facing the Archives Office were primarily related to the burgeoning interest in family history which reached a peak in 1988 and has never subsided. During this period there was a massive increase in the use of the archives and staff had to be reallocated to public areas to deal with the demand. The response to this almost overwhelming increase in the use of archival resources led to the establishment of a "Genealogical Research Kit" consisting of some of the more popular archives available to researchers. This was purchased by many libraries around NSW and reduced the demand on original documents.

== Government Records Repository ==
In 1987, an extension to the Government Records Repository at Kingswood was completed. This included a public reading room, an exhibition area and conference facilities as well as specialised storage. At this time the reading room could accommodate up to fifty people and many of the key documents were available to users on microfilm, with the originals in storage at Globe Street, The Rocks.

== Regional Repositories ==
Initially, the concept of Regional Repositories started as an "archives on loan" scheme to place records which had been created in country areas, close to the originating community. The early 1980s saw a move to place archives at the University of New England, University of Newcastle, University of Wollongong, Riverina Murray Institute of Higher Education (now Charles Sturt University) and Newcastle Region Library. Archives were loaned to these institutions on the condition that they be properly looked after and made available to the local community for research. The regional repositories, with the addition of Broken Hill have grown into an informal network of archives in New South Wales that by 2005, contained a total of 4% of the State's archival holdings.

== State Records Act 1998 ==
The most significant event in the 1990s for the management of archives and government records in New South Wales was the passage into law of the State Records Act in 1998. Not only did this mean a change of name for the organisation, but also meant a change of direction and additional responsibilities.

For many years, it had been realised by the Archives Office of NSW that the focus of the Archives Act 1960 was almost exclusively on archives, rather than on the full life cycle of government records from their inception to their archiving or destruction, the so-called records continuum. To address these issues the new legislation took into account the need for mandating the creation and capture of records, the creation of standards and guidelines, protection of records, recovery of archival "estrays" and public access to records over 30 years old. The span of control of the act also brought local councils, universities and area health services under the umbrella of State Records which added significantly to the workload of the organisation.

== Access to archives ==
During the 1990s, the Genealogical Research Kit which contained microfilm copies of popular key archival documents was expanded, renamed the Archives Resources Kit (ARK), and deposited at forty Community Access Points (CAPs), mainly public libraries, throughout New South Wales. This had the effect of reducing demand in the Reading Rooms at the Sydney and Western Sydney Records Centres. In addition to the Archives Resources Kit, work was going on behind the scenes to make more State archives available to external users electronically. In 2000, Archives Investigator was developed jointly by the State Records Authority of NSW and the Council of the City of Sydney. (The name refers to HMS Investigator, in which Matthew Flinders completed the first circumnavigation of Australia, 1801–1803, and mapped much of the coast for the first time.) This made a large number of archival series available online via the Internet. Work on Photo Investigator, a related database commenced in the early 2000s and by 2006 a considerable number of photographs from the archives were available to users online.

== Expansion of Government Records Repository ==
2005 saw the opening of the Stage 6 Building at the Government Records Repository at Kingswood by The Hon Bob Debus, Attorney General and Minister for the Arts. This building is equipped with geothermal air conditioning, high thermal mass insulation and an argon gas fire suppression system. In 2005, it was estimated that this building would fulfil the storage requirements of the NSW government for non-current records until 2011.

== Museums of History NSW ==
In 2022, the former authority was merged with Sydney Living Museums to form Museums of History NSW, under the Museums of History Act 2022.

== Archives in New South Wales Timeline ==
For further information on archives in New South Wales, see Timeline of archives in New South Wales.

== Bibliography ==
- Archives Act 1960
- Archives Authority of New South Wales Annual Reports 1961–1997
- State Records Authority of New South Wales Annual Reports 1998 to 2005
- Michael Allen ed. Archeion (Archives Office of NSW) No 5 June 1987 pp 7–11
- Doust, Russell The Administration of Official Archives in New South Wales 1870–1980, M Lib thesis 1969
- Peter J. Tyler, State Records New South Wales 1788 to 2011. Annandale, NSW: Desert Pea Press, 2011

== See also ==
- Keyword AAA
