= Architecture of Sydney =

Overview of the architecture in Sydney

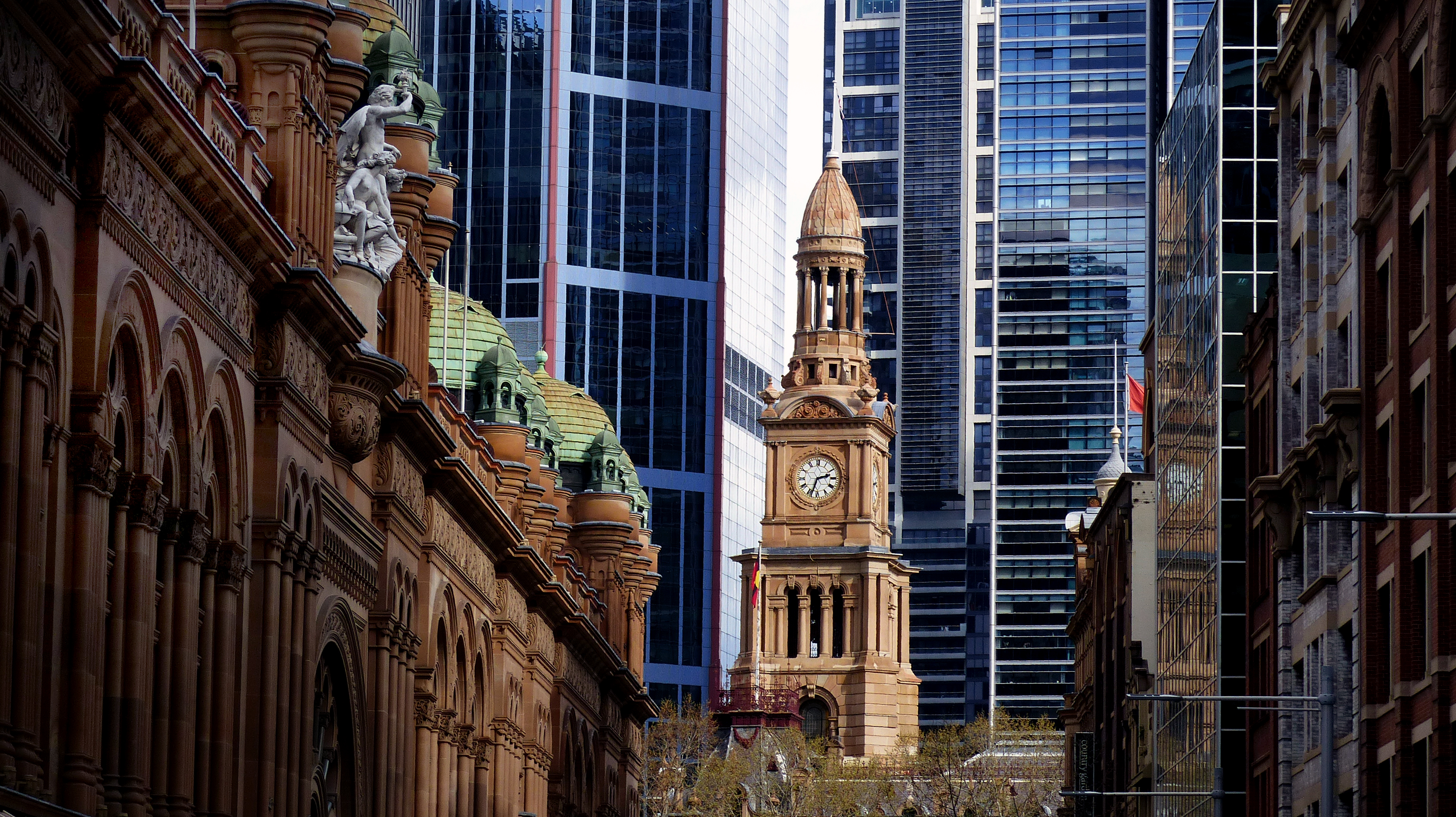
Victorian sandstone buildings juxtaposed with modern skyscrapers

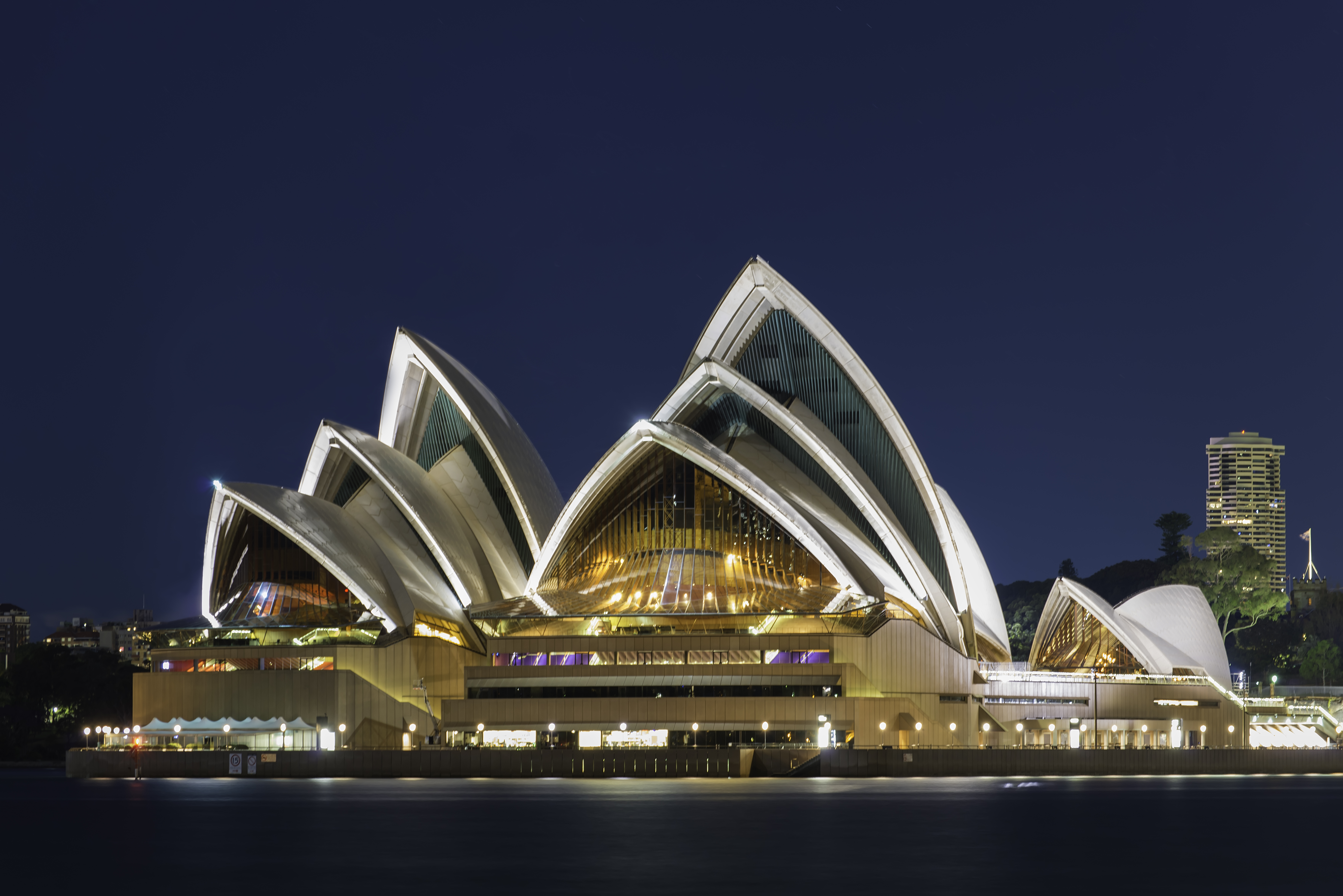
The Sydney Opera House by Danish architect Jørn Utzon

The architecture of Sydney, Australia’s oldest city, is not characterised by any one architectural style, but by an extensive juxtaposition of old and new architecture over the city's 200-year history, from its modest beginnings with local materials and lack of international funding to its present-day modernity with an expansive skyline of high rises and skyscrapers, dotted at street level with remnants of a Victorian era of prosperity.

Under the tenure of early nineteenth-century Governor Lachlan Macquarie, the works of Francis Greenway were the first substantial buildings for the fledgling colony. Later prominent styles were the Victorian buildings of the city centre created out of local Sydney sandstone, and the turn of the century Federation style in the new garden suburbs of the time.

With the lifting of height restrictions in the post-World War II years, much of central Sydney's older stock of architecture was demolished to make way for Modern high rise buildings – according to Singh d'Arcy, in The Apartment House (2017), "From the 1950s onwards, many of Sydney's handsome sandstone and masonry buildings were wiped away by architects and developers who built brown concrete monstrosities in their place. The 1980s saw uncomfortable pastiches of facades with no coherence and little artistic merit". Despite this, Sydney is still home to Australia’s oldest public building, Old Government House, located in Parramatta.

Sydney's notable new buildings were designed by the Austrian-Australian architect Harry Seidler, as well as by international architects such as Jørn Utzon, Jean Nouvel, Richard Rogers, Renzo Piano, Norman Foster, and Frank O. Gehry throughout the 1960s up until the 2010s.

== History ==
=== 1788–1820s: The new colony's restrained Georgian style ===
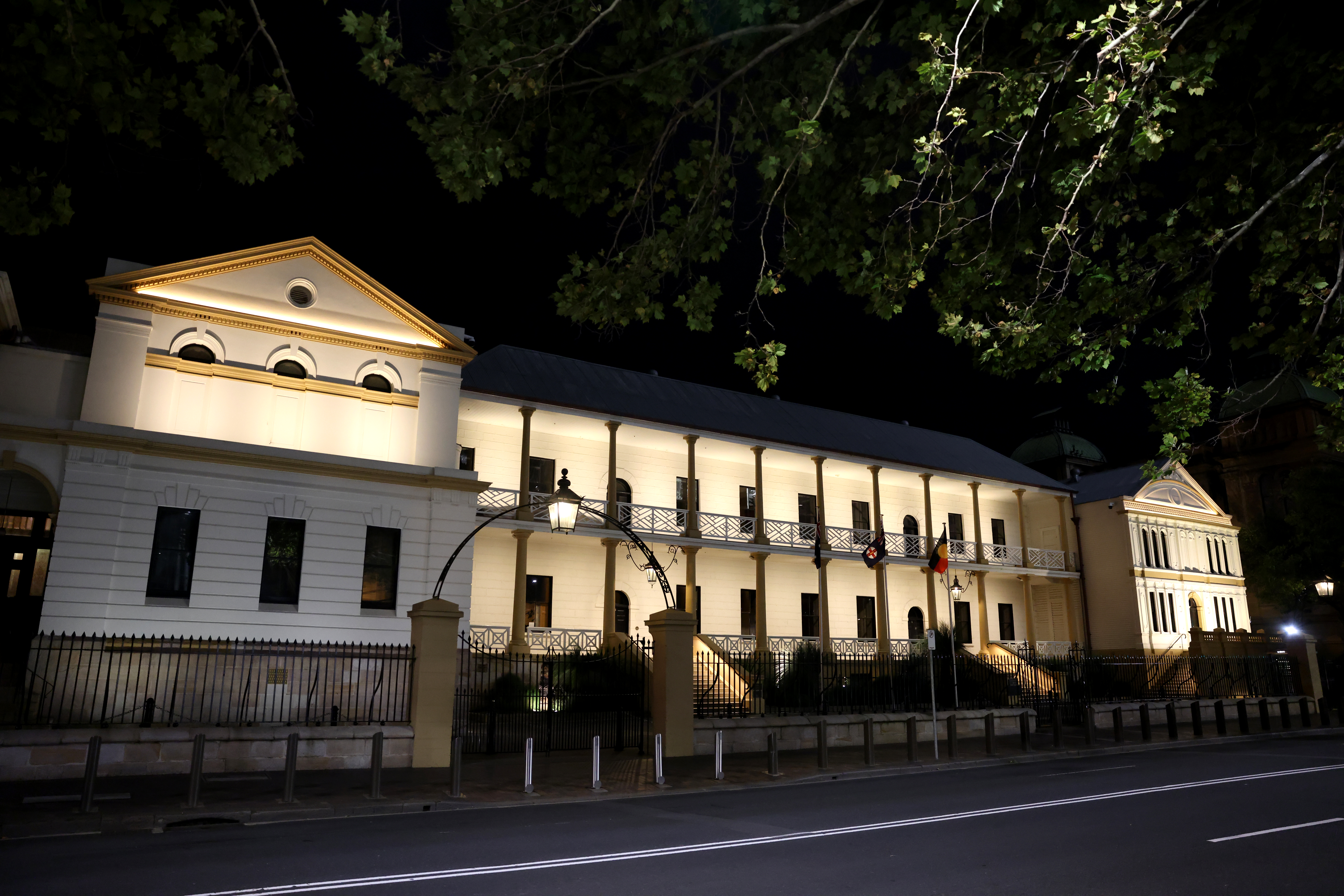
Parliament House, Sydney, the oldest public building in Australia

The British established a colony in Sydney Cove in January 1788 after the First Fleet sailed 9 months from Portsmouth. The early years of the colony suffered from a sense of provisionality and the attitude of the majority of convicts and their guardians that they would return to Britain once they had "done their time." The colony was poorly equipped, had little food supplies, and did not understand the climate or soil. For its first two years it faced starvation. In 1790, Governor Arthur Phillip began the process of freeing convicts and granting them land, such as that at Rose Hill 20 km inland which provided a stable food supply to the colony.

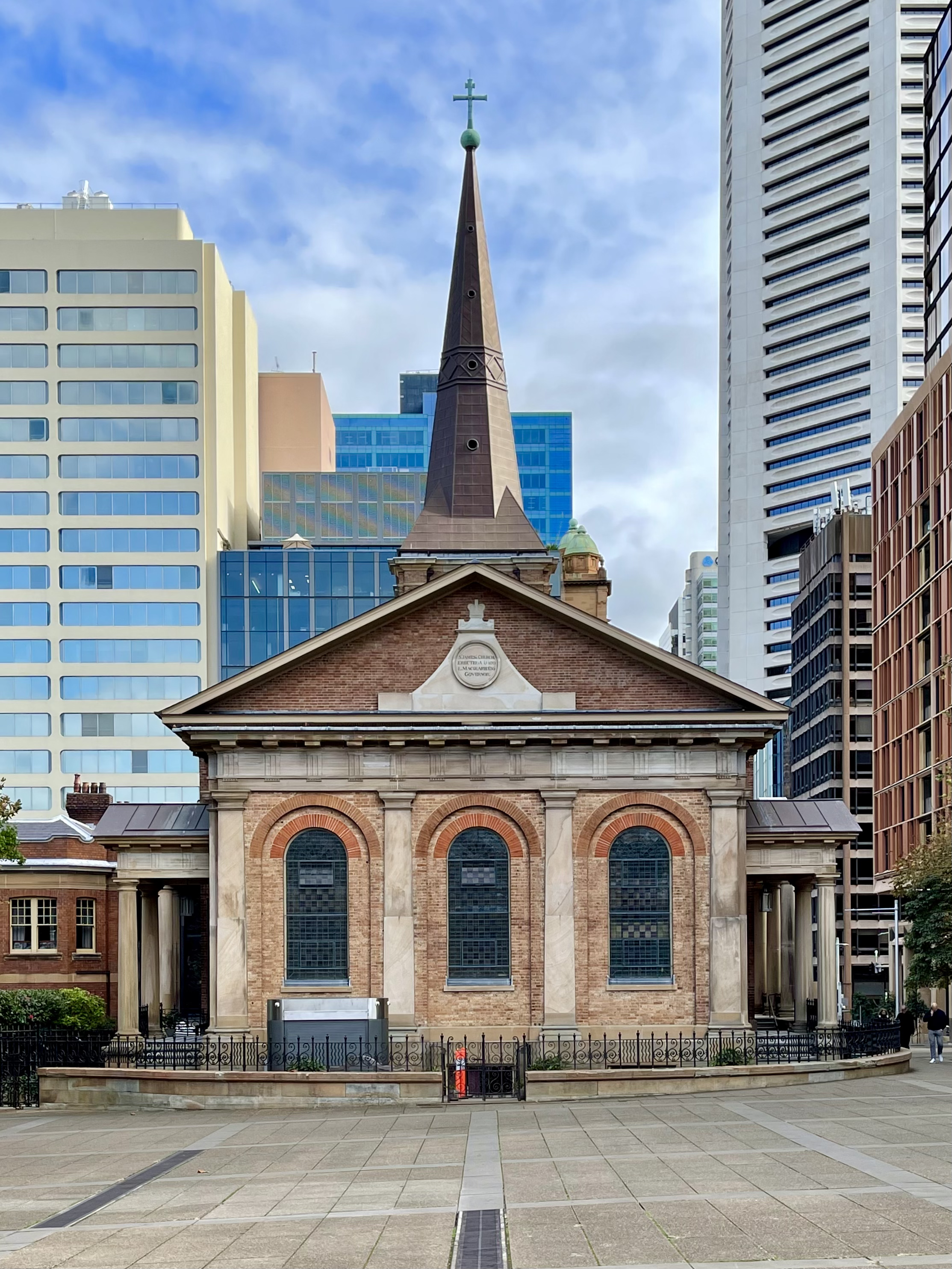
St James Church (1824)

The British Government did not provide architects, builders to the new colony, or useful tools. Request for building tools were responded to tardily with more inappropriate tools, which was seen as a sign that the British Government was reluctant to invest money in a penal colony, even though the number of free settlers was increasing. Amateur builders took time to work out what local materials were suitable. Those significant buildings that were built were of such poor workmanship and materials that they needed constant maintenance. Lieutenant William Dawes produced a town plan for Sydney in 1790 but it was ignored in the under-resourced and often lawless society, and Sydney's layout still shows this lack of planning. The earliest significant buildings in Sydney were simple restrained Georgian buildings that were suited to the climate (often by virtue of deep verandahs), available materials and craftsmanship, and were based in a spirit of making do and improvisation.

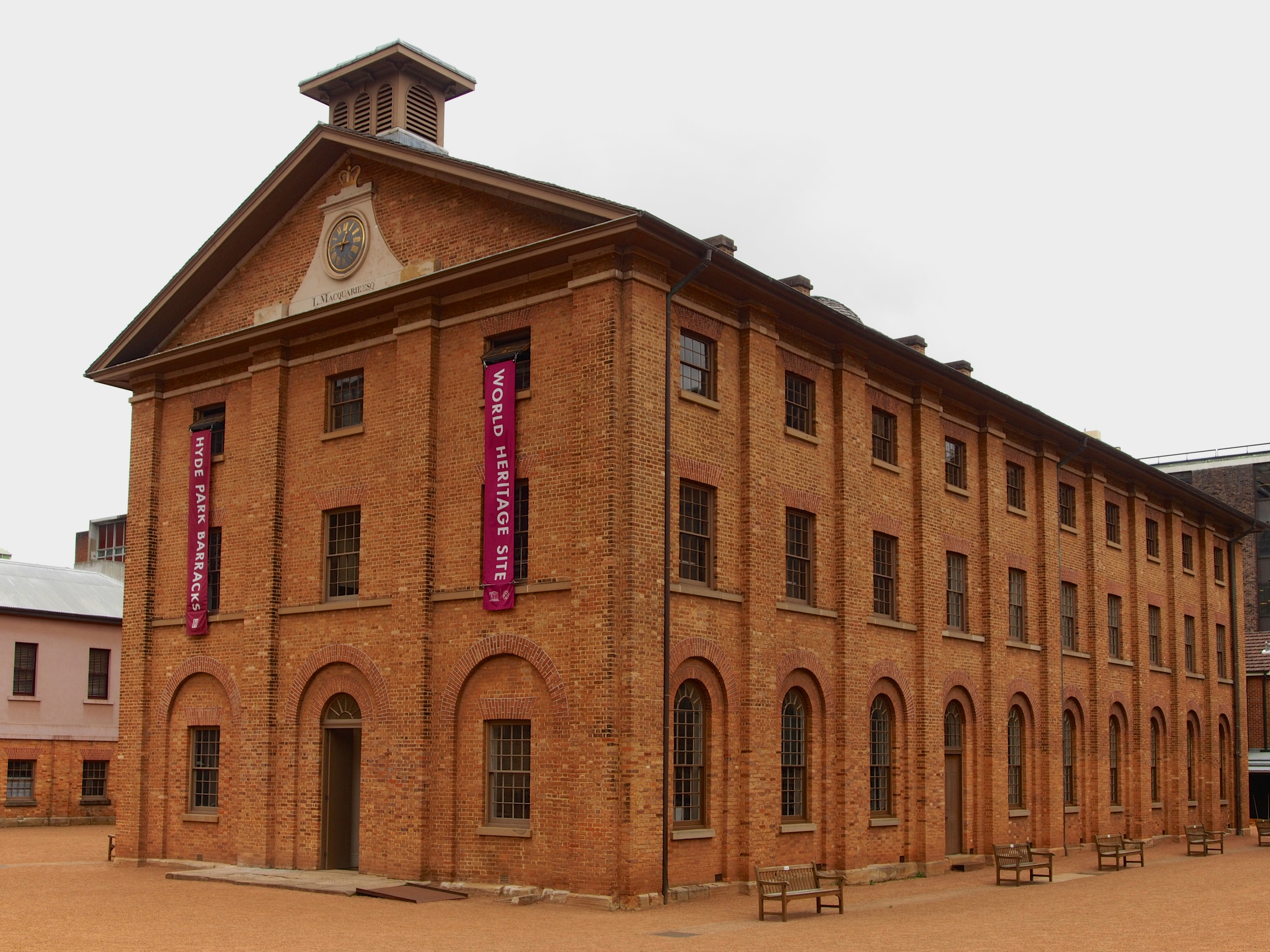
Hyde Park Barracks

Governor Macquarie's tenure began in 1810 and he promoted the idea of Sydney as a successful society of free citizens. He commissioned a survey of all aspects of the colony including its buildings which he found to be in a "most ruinous state of decay". He implemented a basic building code with certain minimum standards for new buildings and a requirement that every plan was to be submitted for new buildings. He saw his role as one of nation-building with a responsibility to provide facilities that were functional and provided a sense of community pride. By the end of his tenure, Macquarie had overseen the construction of 92 brick buildings, 22 stone buildings, 52 weatherboard houses, four bridges, seven quays and moles, and over 200 miles of road. In 1814, Francis Greenway, a convict serving a fourteen-year sentence for forgery, arrived in Sydney.

Over a short period of time, a partnership between him and Macquarie saw the construction of fine public buildings that were classically inspired, restrained decoratively and well-portioned and included Hyde Park Barracks, St James Church, St Matthews at Windsor, and Old Liverpool Hospital at Liverpool. An 1819 commission of inquiry into the colony accused Macquarie of extravagance particularly in regard to construction and he was recalled to England. This effectively ended Greenway's career and little public construction was carried out until the late 1830s.

=== 1830s–1850s: eclectic neo-Gothic ===
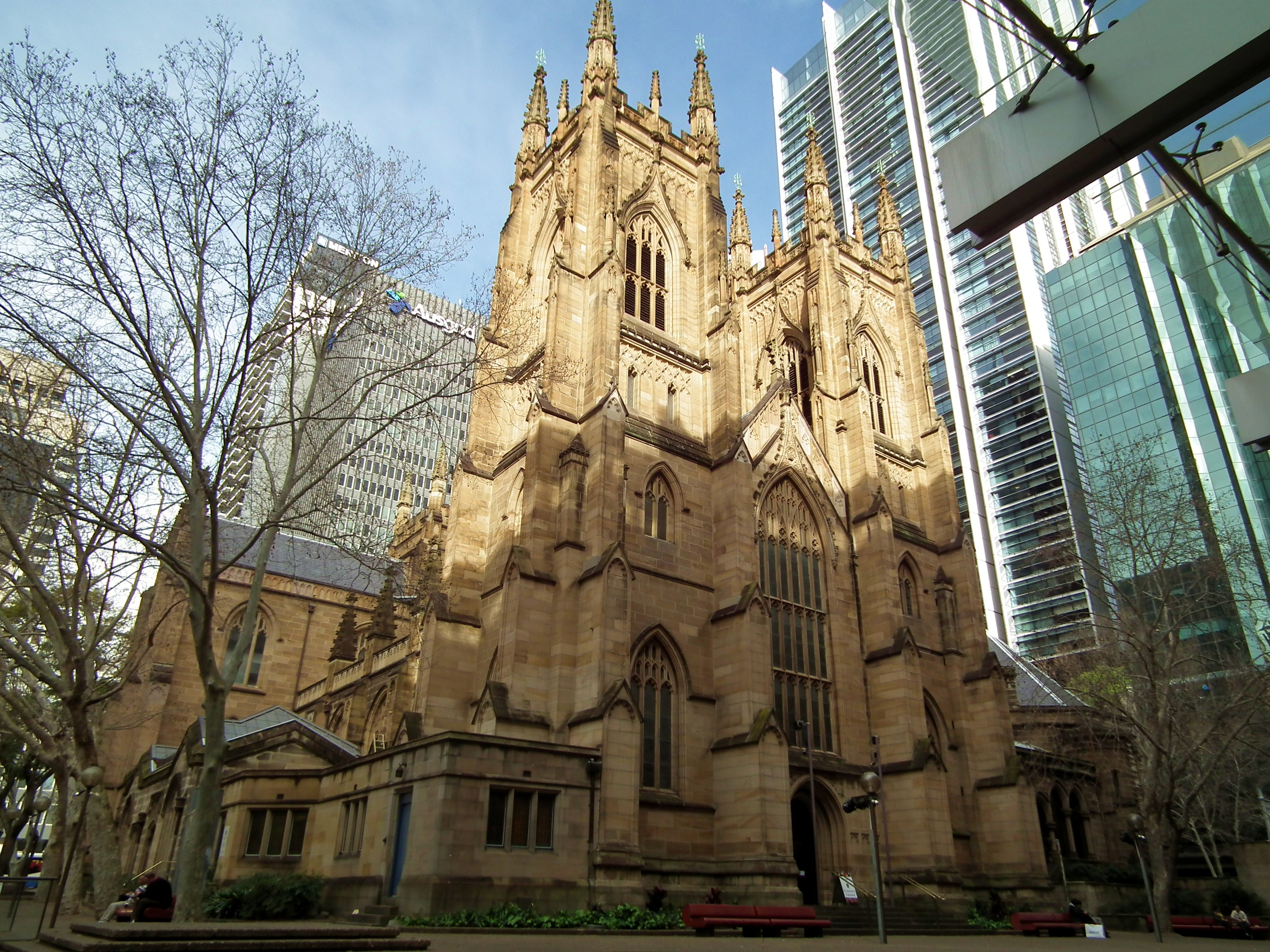
St Andrew's Cathedral by Edmund Blacket

Population growth, the granting of perpetual leases on town properties, the encouragement of free trade and exports underpinned a booming economy. Since the beginning of the colony, officers and administrators were housed on the eastern side of the Tank Stream, while lower ranks and commerce was consigned to the western side. By the 1830s this had become entrenched with fine homes on the Potts Point ridge. The derivative neo-Classical Georgian style was being replaced with the more ornate and eclectic Gothic Revival. John Verge was the most renowned architect in the 1830s and his buildings included Tusculum in Potts Point, Elizabeth Bay House, and Camden Park.

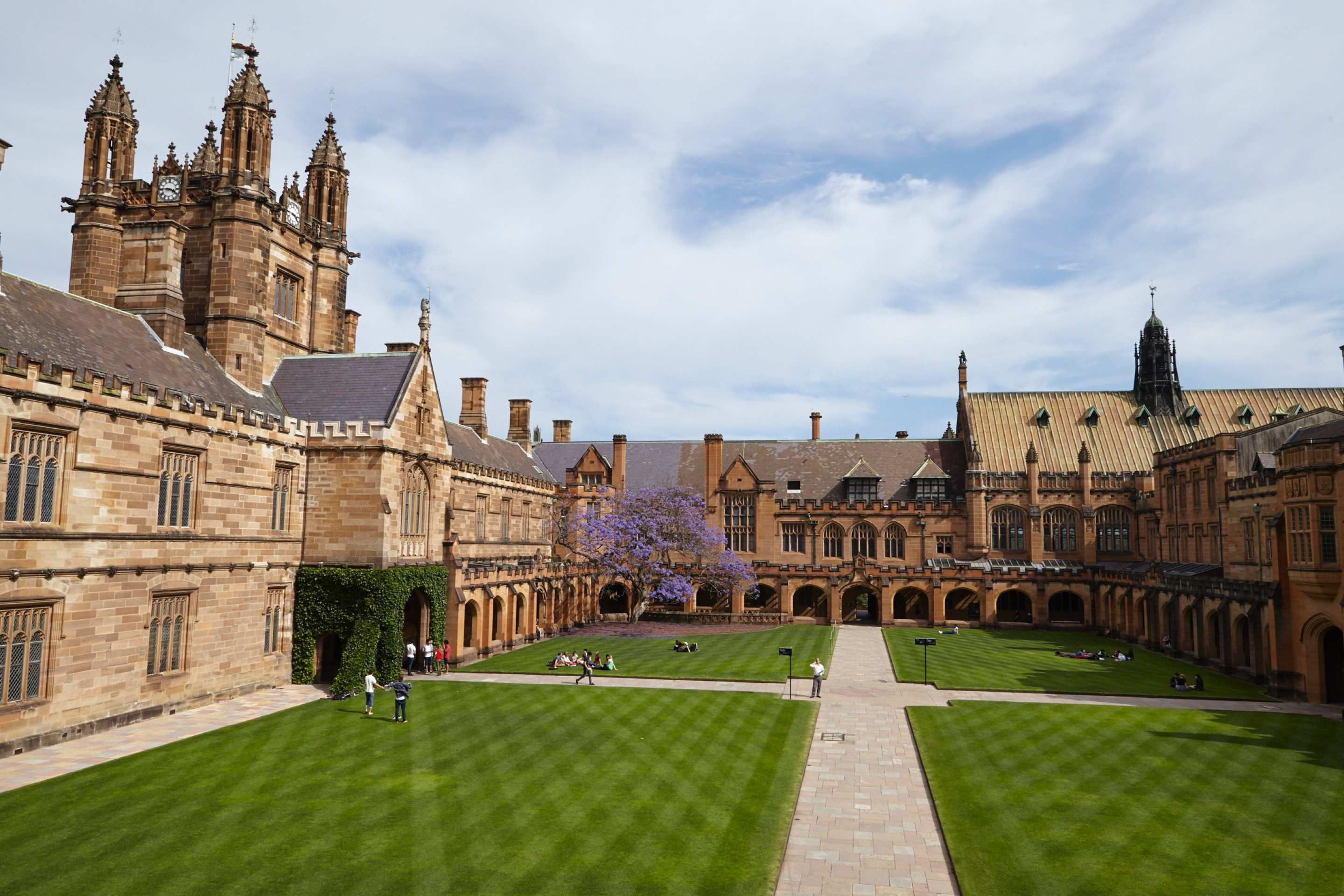
The ornate Gothic Revival University of Sydney

The 1840s saw an increasingly buoyant economy and confident society pushed along by the end of convict transportation and the commencement of an independent legislature. A building boom embraced the neo-Gothic style whereby the colony's strong need to identify with the home country was manifest. Public, commercial and domestic architecture overlooked the local climate in favour of styles transported from Britain, and projects with substantial budgets often produced an indiscriminate eclecticism. Conversely, projects with limited budgets that precluded ostentatious and derivative design often resulted a kind of vernacular style that responded to local conditions. Rather than a connecting device between rooms, the verandah became a sun-shading device, and solid sandstone walls and cross-ventilation stabilised both cold and hot temperature extremes.

=== 1850s – Victorian architecture ===
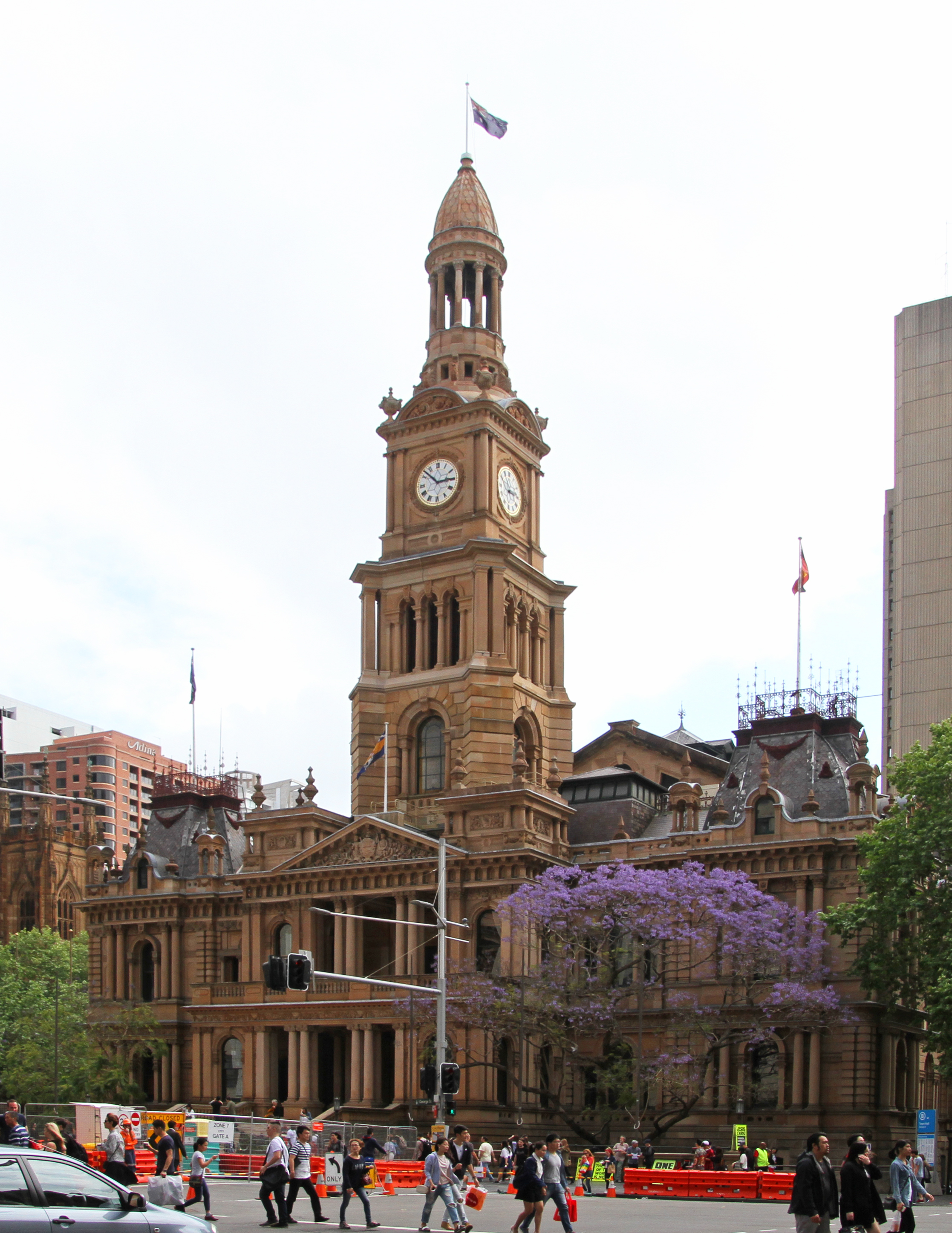
Sydney Town Hall, in Second Empire style

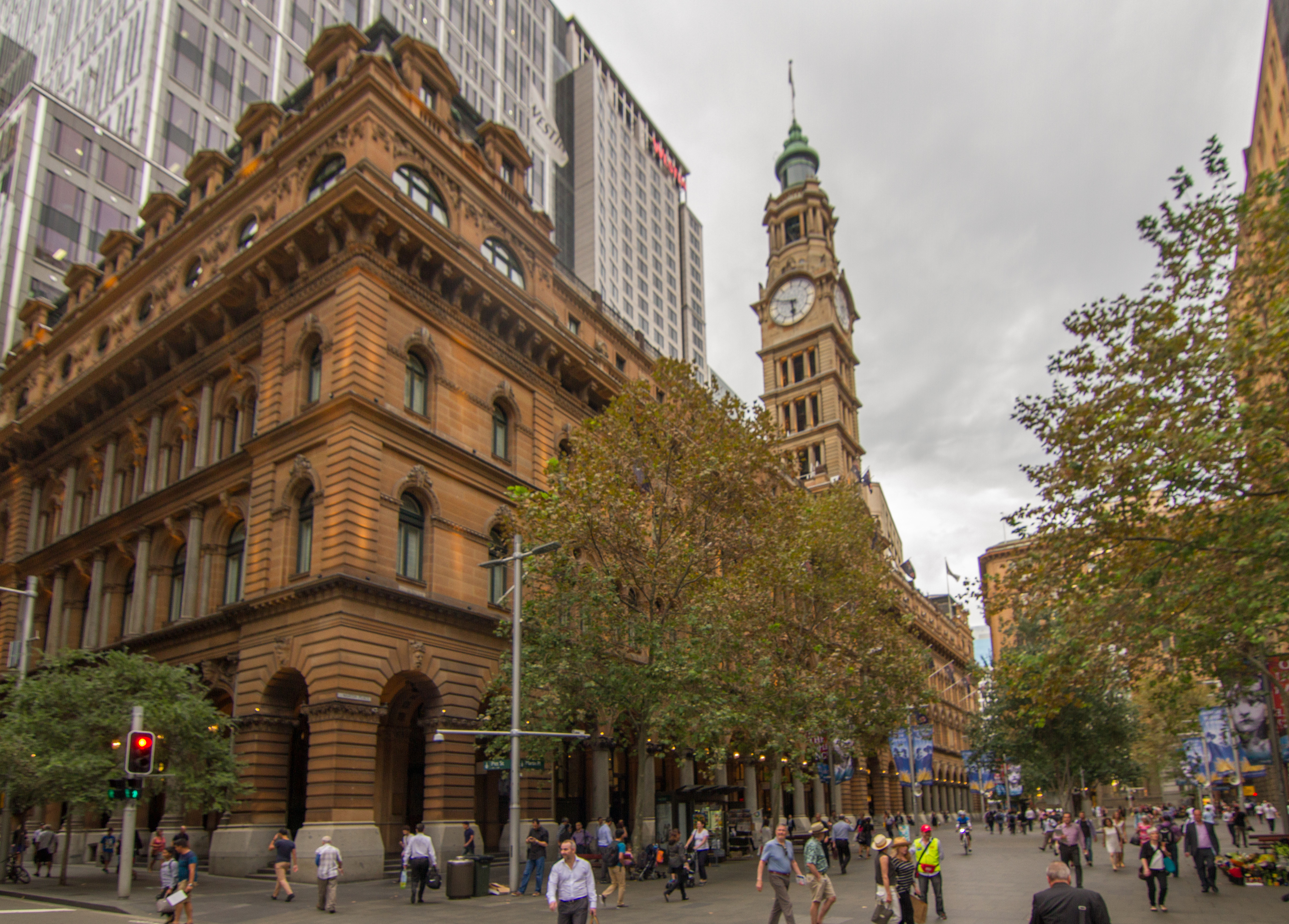
The General Post Office; once Sydney's tallest building

Victorian aspirations for respectability, formality, and materialism were compounded in Sydney by colonial yearning for respect, which in architecture resulted in the copying of imported styles, mostly from Great Britain. New wealth and rapid increase in population came with the 1850s gold rush. A new middle class emerged who wanted homes, cities and public buildings that matched their new wealth and social status and construction of high quality buildings such as churches, commercial and public buildings, and ostentatious houses of the wealthy boomed. On the other hand, housing for the working and lower middle class remained substandard and the prevalence of unhygienic and slum conditions grew. In the 1860s, architecture in Sydney focussed more on style than consideration of the building's function in relation to its setting and climate. An increase in Italian immigrants influenced residential construction which manifest itself in a growing popularity of surface ornamentation, plasterwork, squared massing, arcades and loggias, and square towers. The simplicity of early colonial architecture was replaced by decorative facades using ornate cast iron with higher ceilings featuring elaborate mouldings.

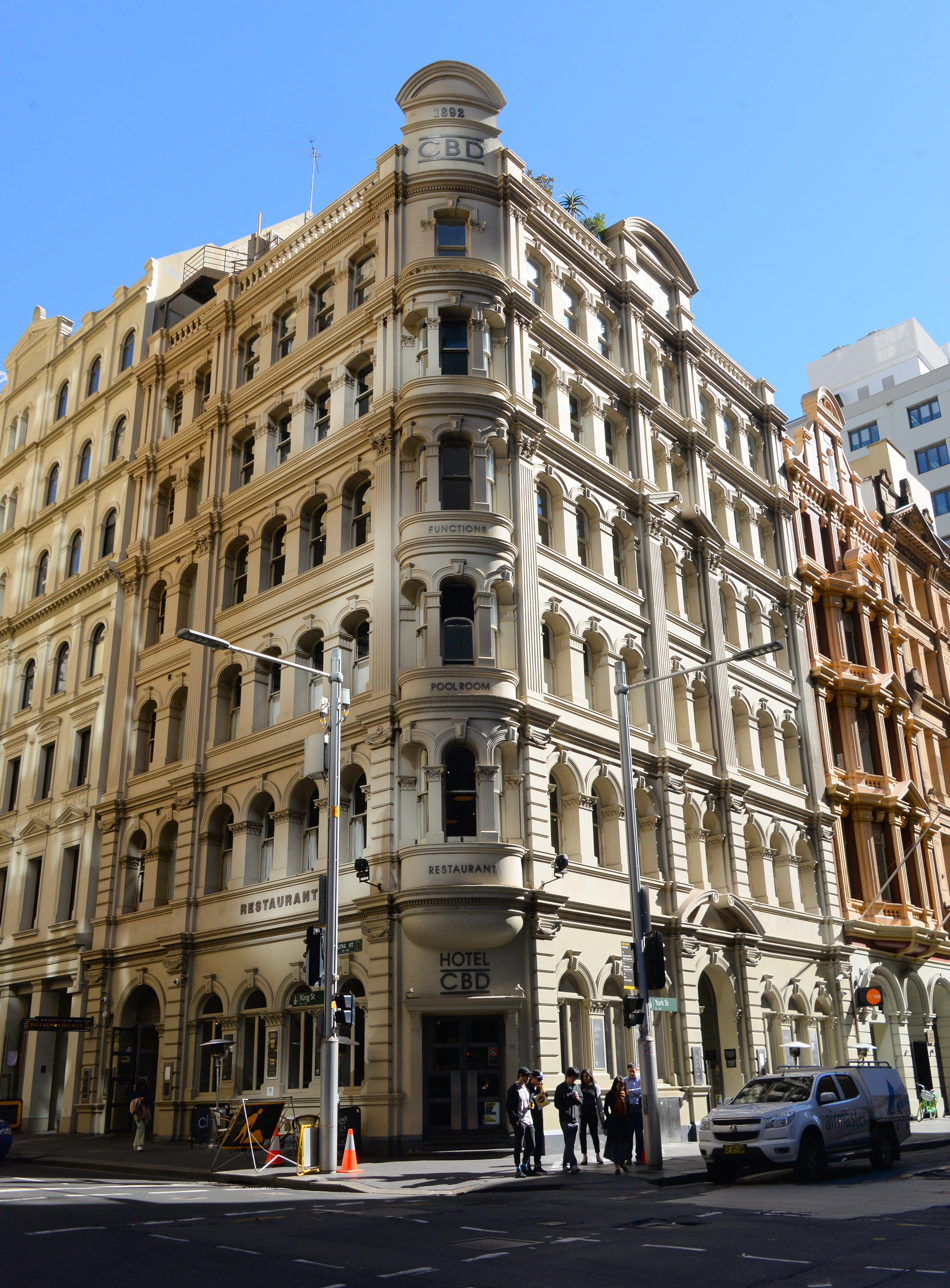
The Former National House

Major new civic buildings included Edmund Blacket's Main Quadrangle Building at the University of Sydney completed in 1859. James Barnet was Colonial Architect from 1862 and was Sydney's most prolific Victorian architect. His buildings included The Australian Museum (1864), Customs House (1884), the General Post Office (1890), the Lands Department Building (1881 & 1893) and the Chief Secretary’s Building (1878). He also was responsible for many suburban post offices, court houses and other civic buildings. Most of Sydney's public buildings from this time, including Barnet's, were built from local stone and were a variety of styles including Italianate, Gothic, and neo-Classical with heavily worked façades. The early 1860s saw a renewed interest in the use of brick. Mass production of bricks commenced in the 1870s, although hand production continued until the end of the 19th century.

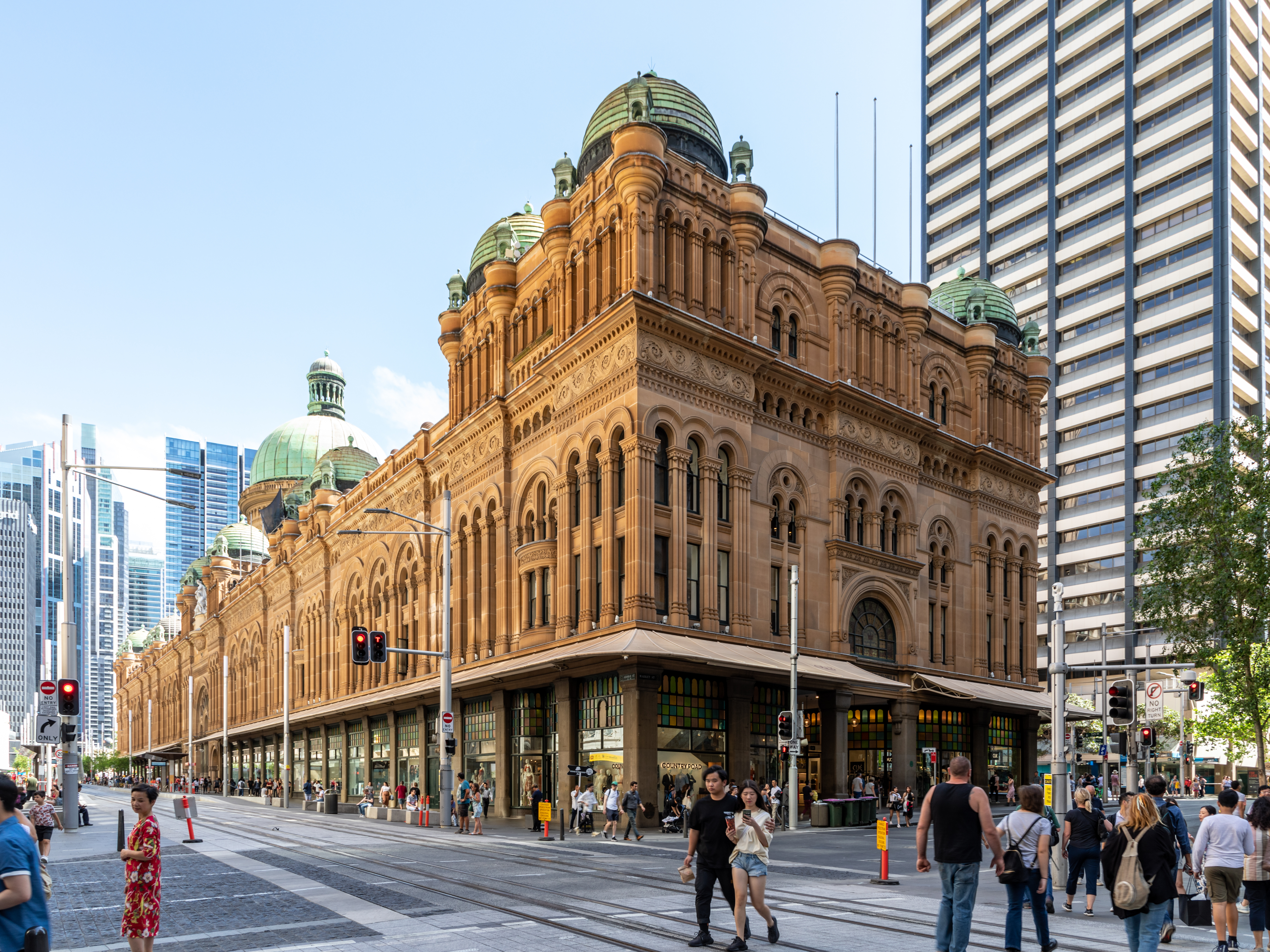
The Queen Victoria Building in the Victorian Romanesque style

By 1880, two-thirds of the population had been born in Australia and a growing nationalism viewed the country as paradise compared to the Old World. With a booming economy, Australians sought to prove they could compete with the Old World–during this time many Australian department stores, coffee houses and grand hotels were constructed. Most of them were built in the larger cities of Sydney and Melbourne, and some still stand in Sydney today. Anthony Hordern & Sons and the Australia Hotel did not survive, however the Grace Building (The Grace Hotel), which was inspired by the Tribune Tower in Chicago and completed in 1930, is leftover as an example from the flourishing period in Australia that ran from the 1880s until the late 1920s. Built in the then relatively new art deco style, The Grace was "designed to use the first two storeys in the manner of a department store. The remaining storeys were intended to provide rental office accommodation for importers and other firms engaged in the softgoods trade".

=== Inter and Post World War ===
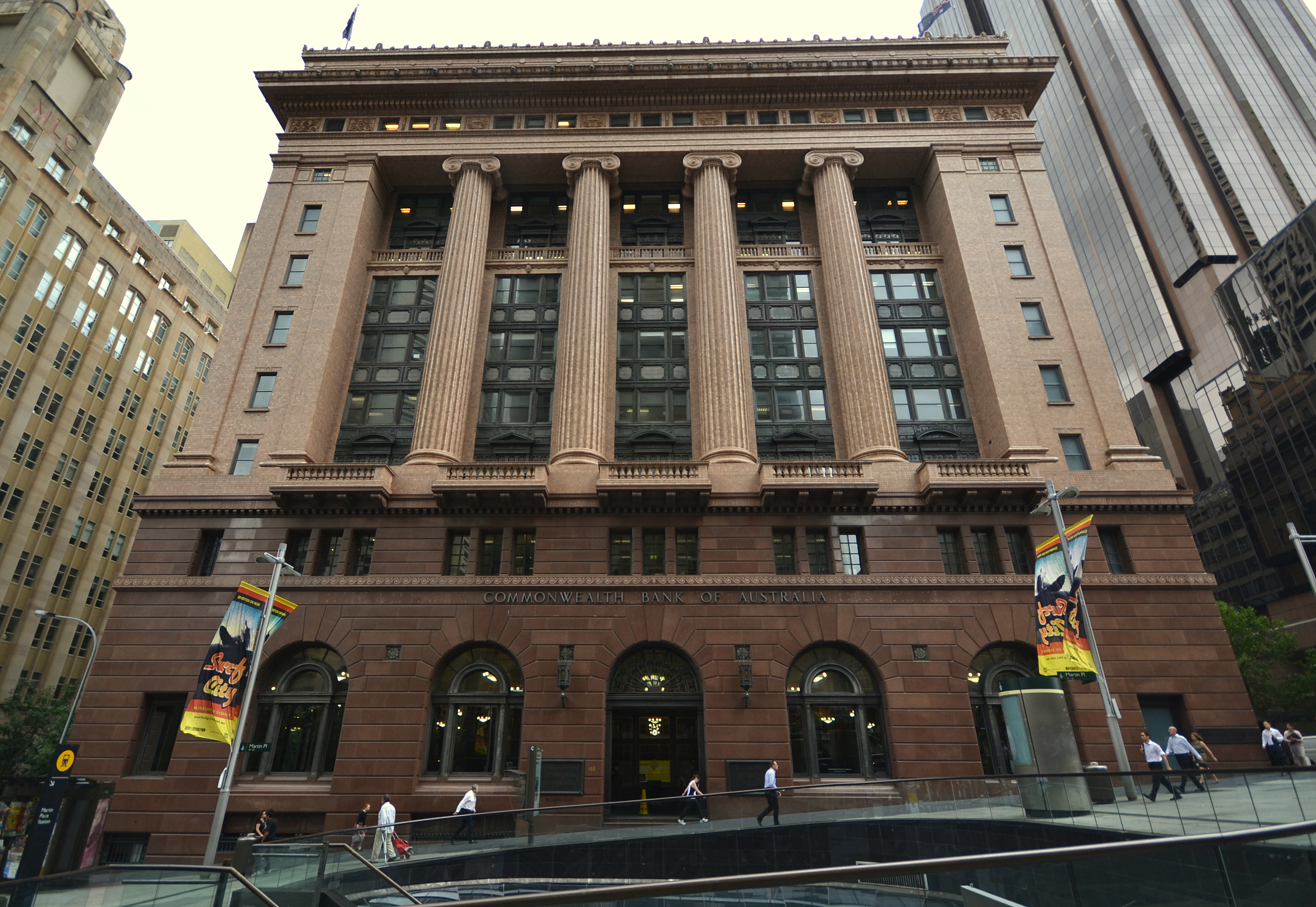
The Commonwealth Bank building in Martin Place; an interwar Beaux-Arts office block largely typical of the period

The Great Depression and World War II created a severe housing shortage for Australia in the late 1940s. A shortage of materials and skilled labour compounded the shortages, as did restrictive bank lending practises whereby it was the norm for borrowers to put up a deposit of 50% of the value of a house. Building plots of around 115 square metres aggravated the problems further. These factors fed a building industry recession and the cost of building home in the decade following the war grew by 600%. In response, young architects who had worked in Europe and returned to Australia brought a simplicity to design and construction and renewed interest in logical structure and free planning. Verandahs and porches were less common on houses, and slightly pitched roofs replaced hipped roofs. Designs no longer featured non-functional ornamentation, ceilings were lower and rooms were expected to be multi-purpose. Vestibules were eliminated, hallways, and separate dining and living rooms were eliminated and the main entry was directly into the living room.

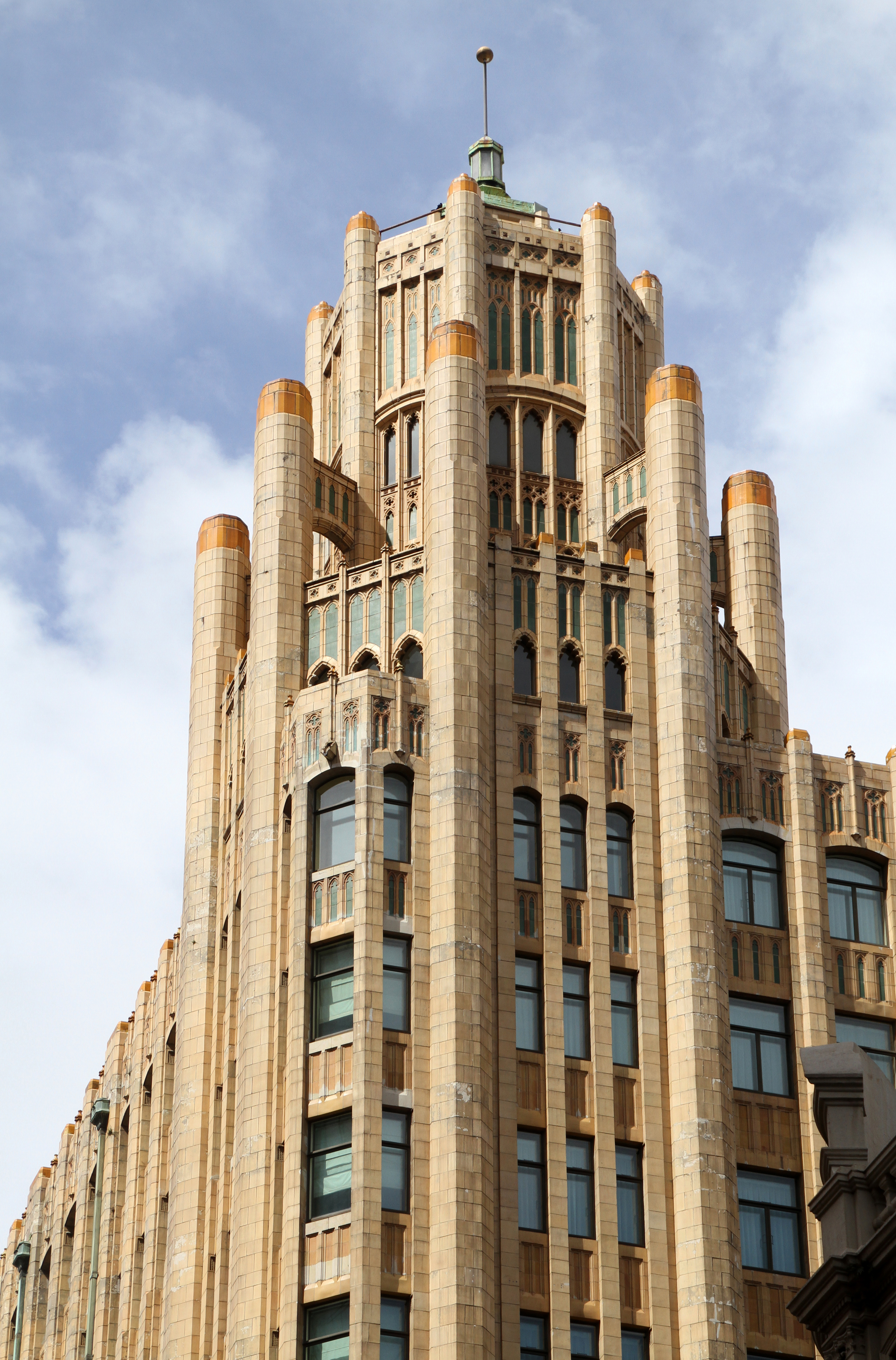
The Art Deco/Gothic Revival Grace Building

Harry Seidler was instrumental in the introduction of Internationalism to Sydney. He studied under Walter Gropius at Harvard, worked with Marcel Breuer, and had been tutored by Josef Albers at Black Mountain College. The Rose Seidler House, for his parents, was the first of 10 buildings he built in Sydney between 1948 and 1952. The house was a revelation to conservative 1950s Sydney.

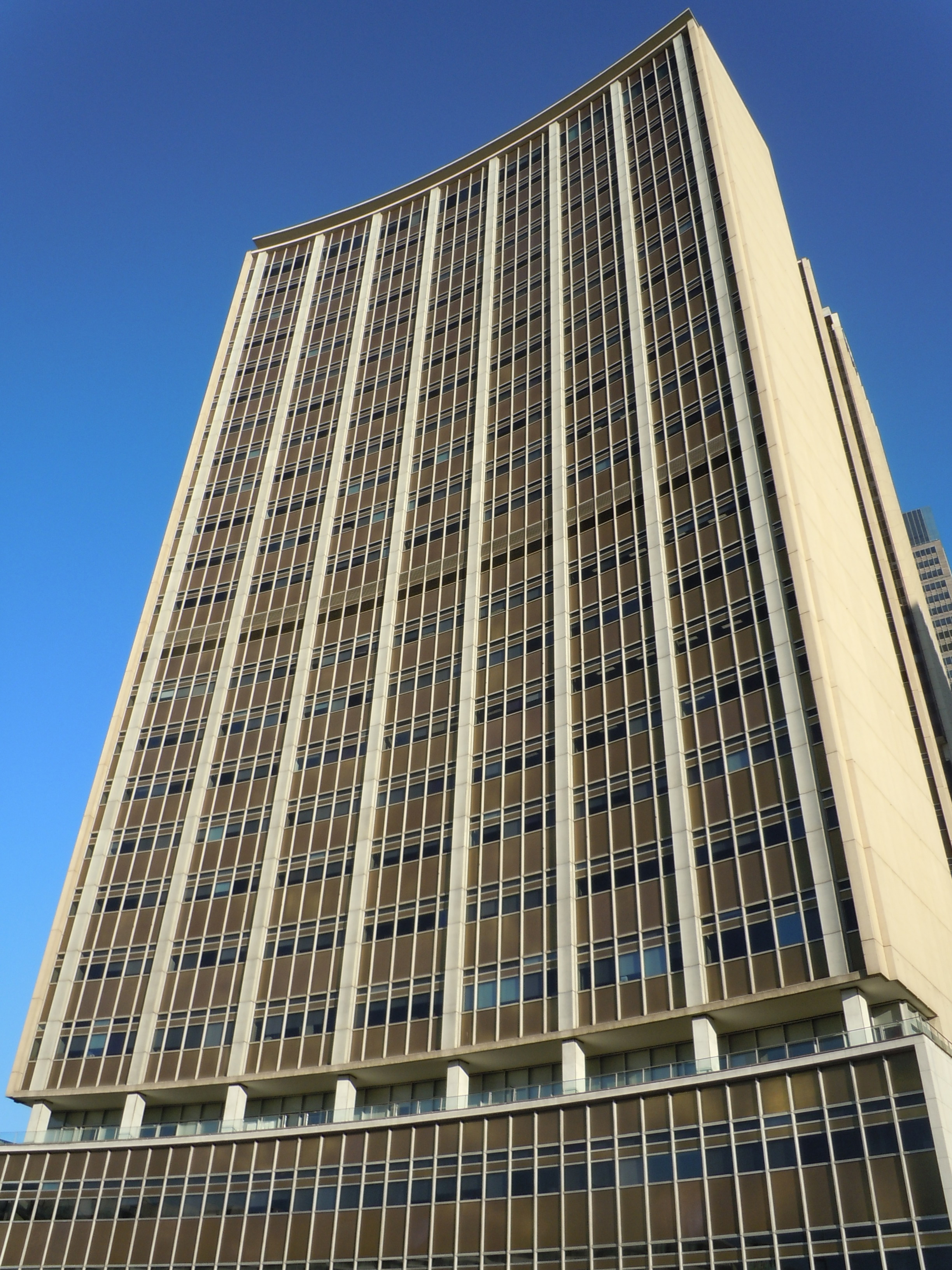
The lifting of height restrictions saw the construction of various high-rises, such as the AMP Building; in the Modernist style.

In contrast to Seidler's strongly European flavour of Modernism was the softer form practised by the so-called Sydney School of the 1950s and 1960s. This loose collection of architects, comprising, among others, Bill Lucas, Bruce Rickard, Neville Gruzman and Ken Woolley, favoured organic and natural houses, often built on steep slopes and hidden from view in natural bushland. These projects were largely on the city's North Shore, and to a lesser extent in the Eastern Suburbs. Following on from Walter Burley Griffin's work in the Sydney suburb of Castlecrag, this style of Australian architecture was visually sensitive to the environment and, like Griffin, often utilised natural local materials as structural elements.

In the central business district, the lifting of height restrictions heralded the beginning of the city's change into a largely high-rise city.

Opened in 1973, the Sydney Opera House was designed by Danish architect Jørn Utzon. Its construction was partly financed by the Opera House Lottery. Utzon left under acrimonious circumstances before the building was finished; later work was completed by other architects. Located on Bennelong Point on Sydney Harbour, the building is a World Heritage Site. The tallest point in the city is the Sydney Tower built in the late 1970s-early 1980s, when height restrictions were far more lenient. The observation tower provides views of the entire city.

Sydney is home to Australia's first building by renowned Canadian architect Frank Gehry, the Dr Chau Chak Wing Building (2015), based on the design of a tree house. An entrance from The Goods Line–a pedestrian pathway and former railway line–is located on the eastern border of the site. One Central Park, completed in 2014, is a mixed-use building located in Chippendale. Developed as a joint venture between Frasers Property and Sekisui House, it was constructed as the first stage of the Central Park urban renewal project. It consists of two high-rise apartment buildings, and features vertical hanging gardens. In 2013, One Central Park was awarded a 5 star Green Star – 'Multi-Unit Residential Design v1' Certified Rating by the Green Building Council of Australia, making it the largest multi-residential building (by nett lettable area) in Australia to receive such a designation.

Examples of contemporary architecture in Sydney
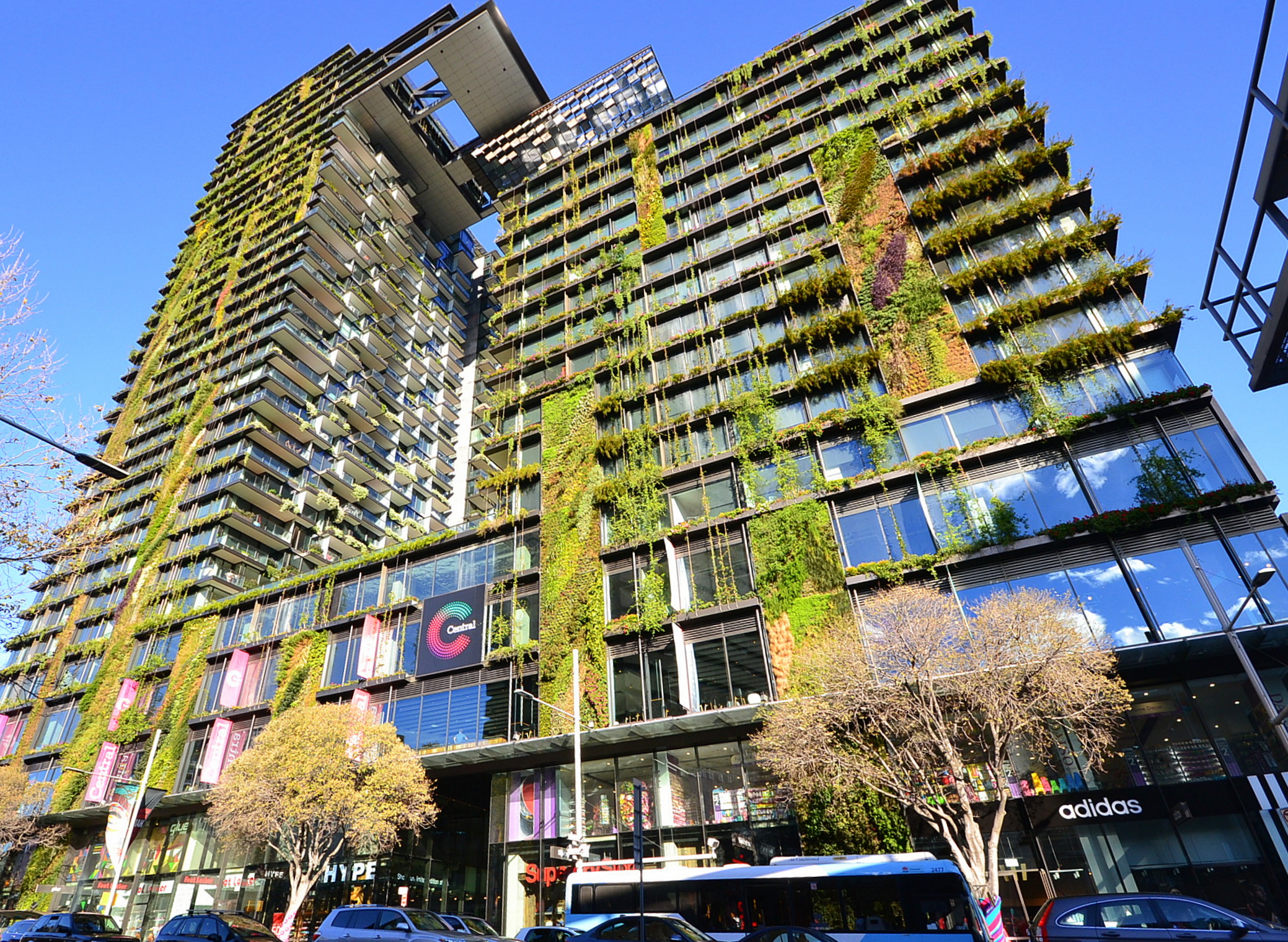
One Central Park

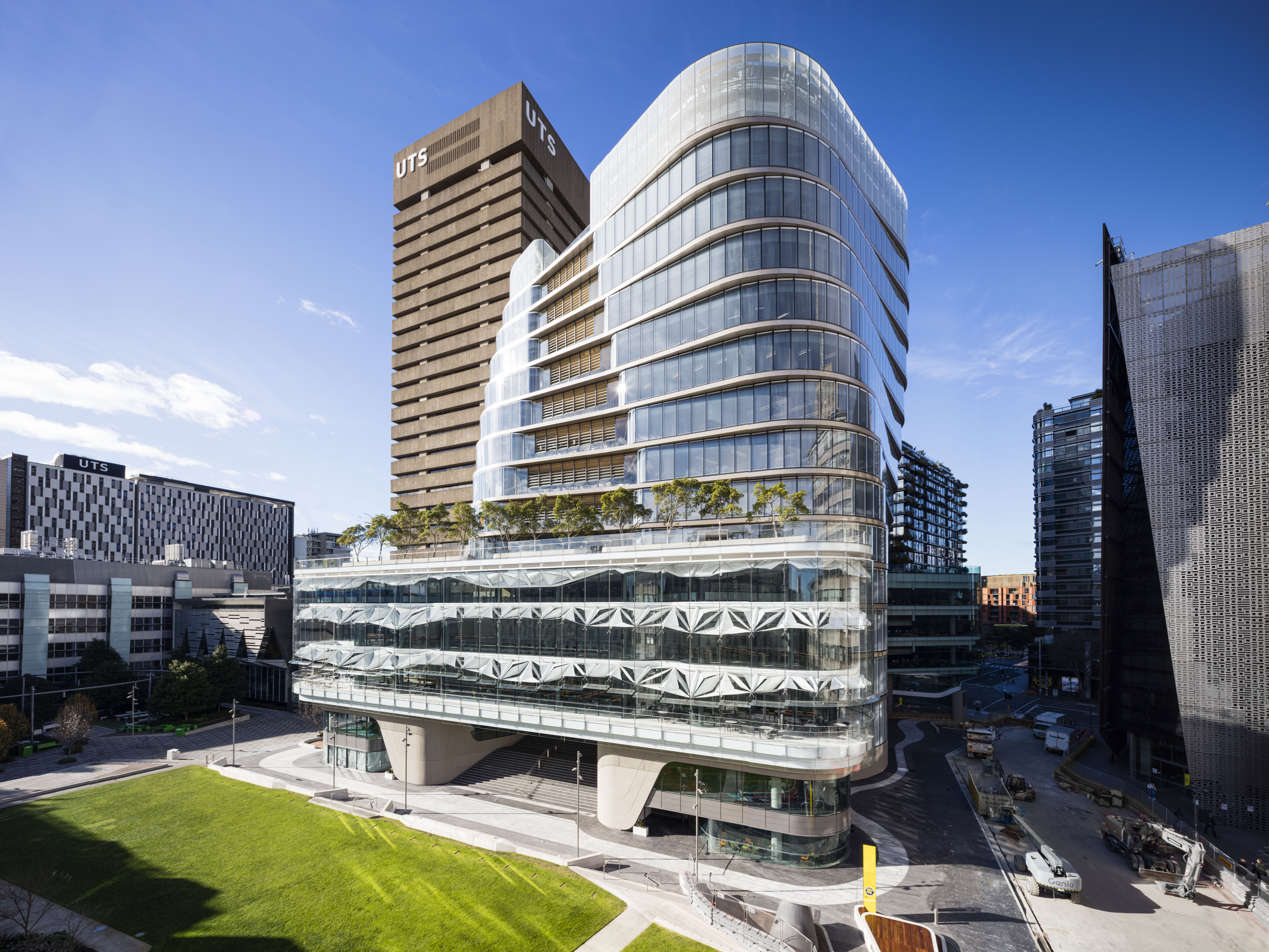
UTS Central at the University of Technology Sydney

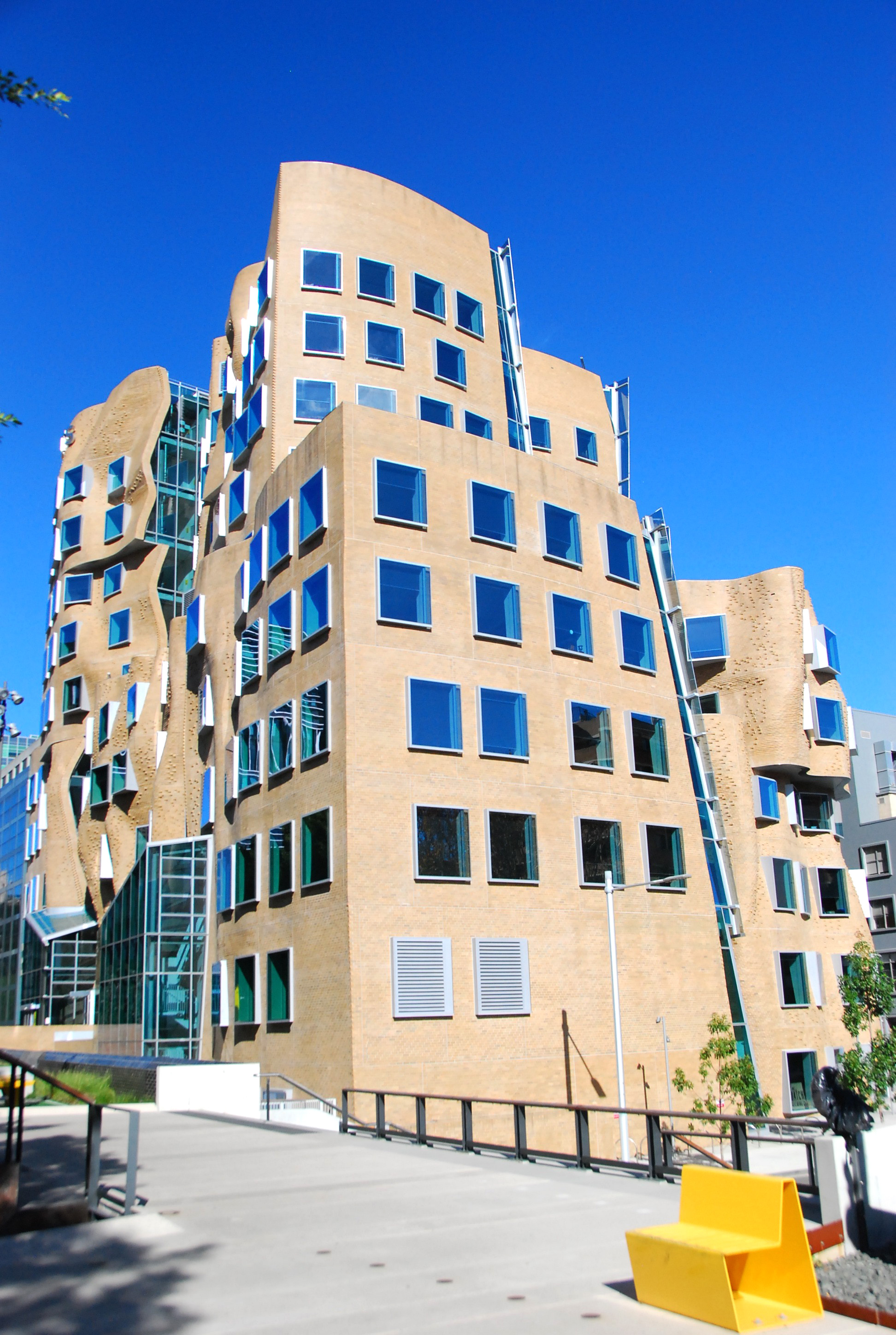
Frank Gehry's Dr Chau Chak Wing Building from The Goods Line

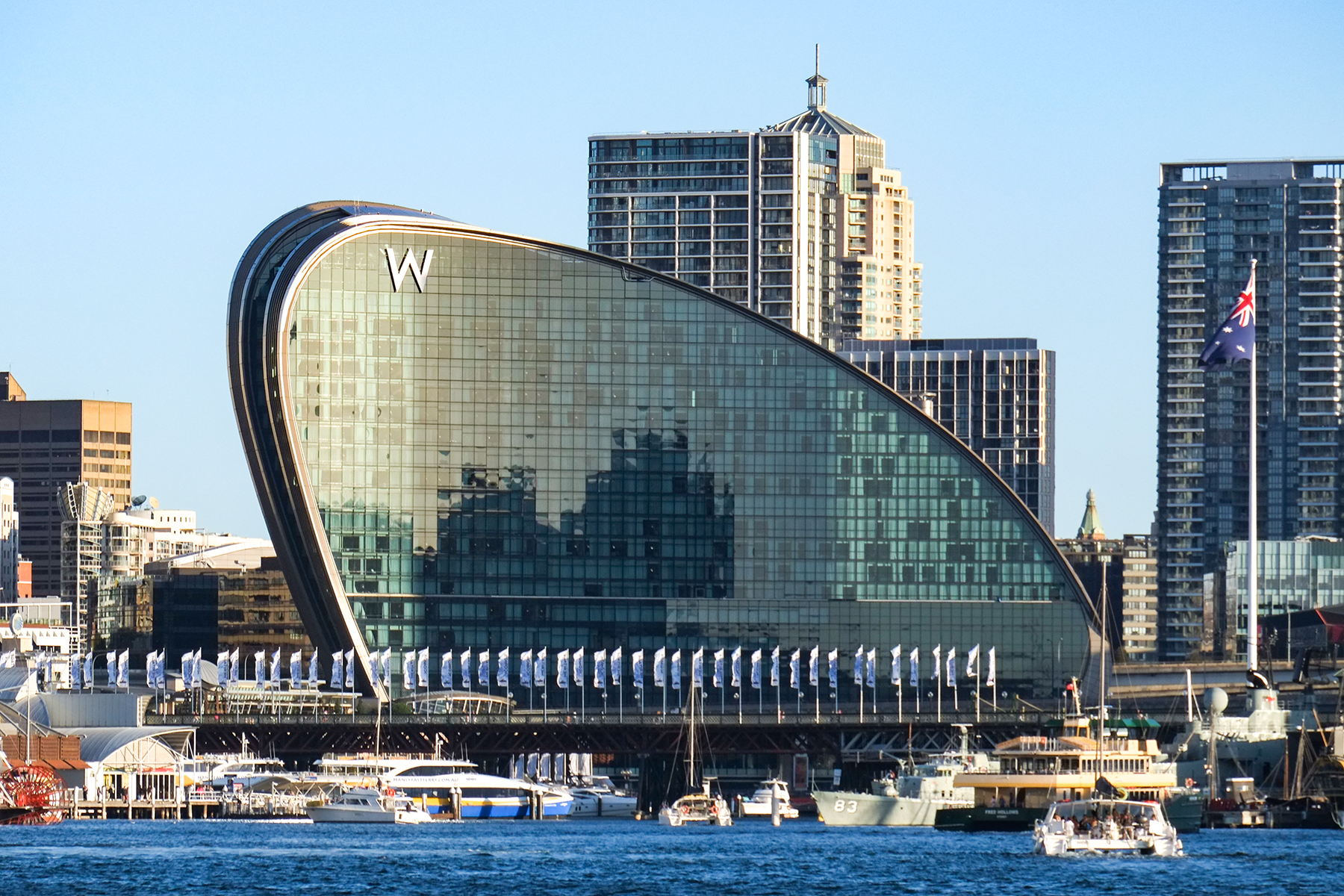
The Ribbon at Darling Harbour

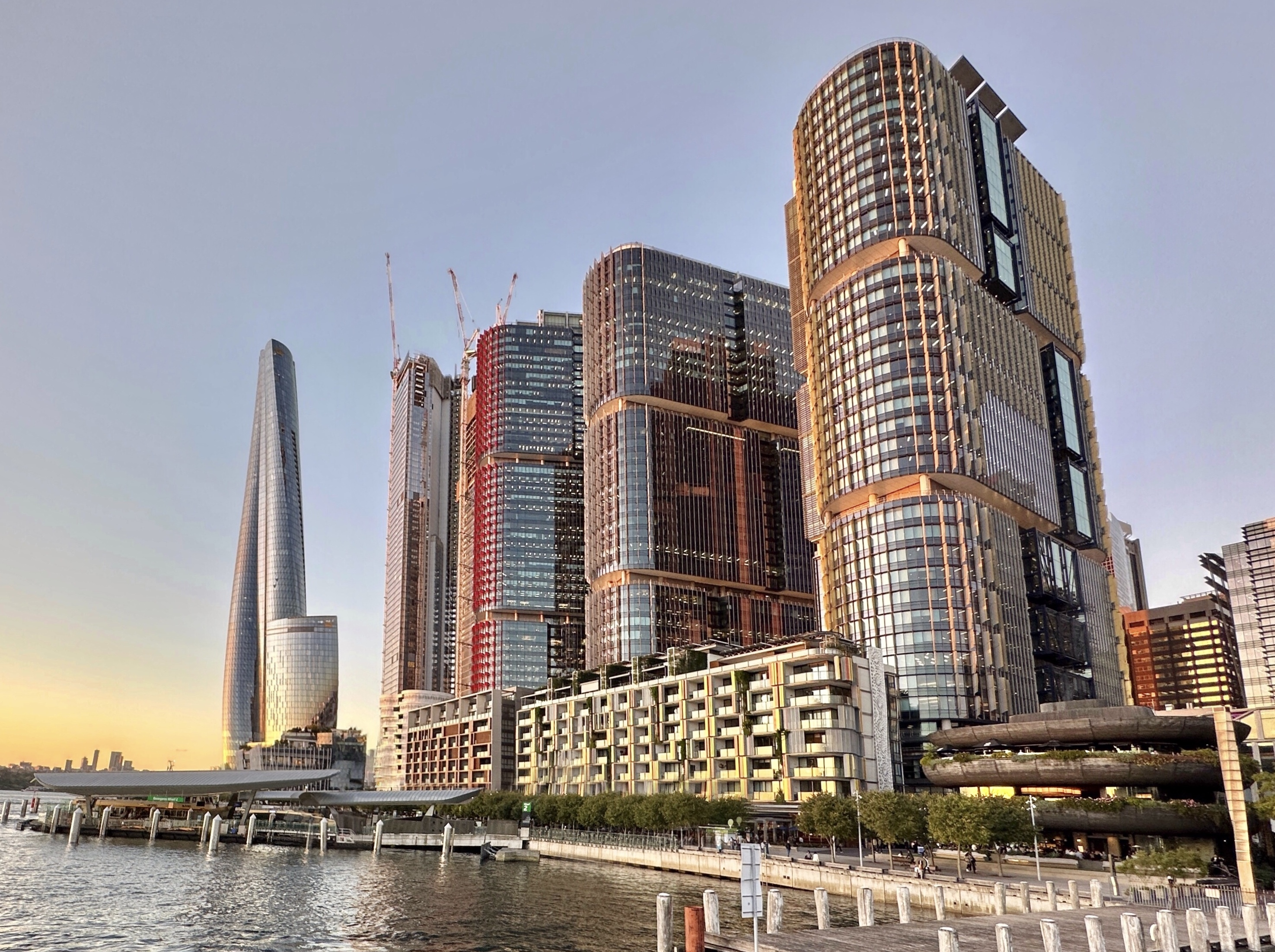
Crown Sydney, One Sydney Harbour and International Towers at Barangaroo

==== Heritage laws: poor attitudes to historic buildings throughout the 1970s to the 2000s ====
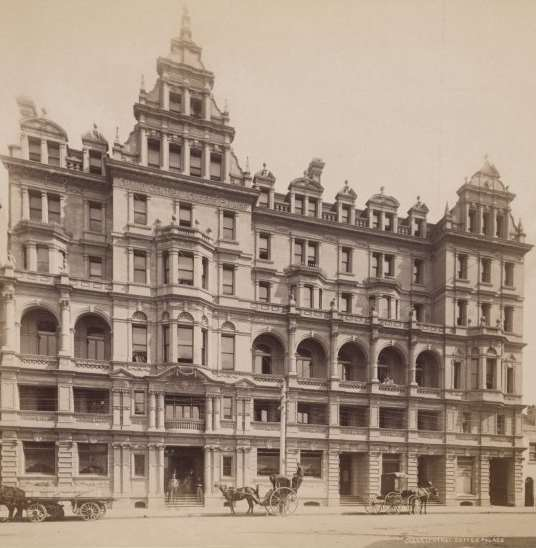
Grand Central Coffee Palace in the 1890s, demolished in the 1960s

Sydney lost most of its notable inter-war cinemas between the mid-1960s and the mid-1980s, including the Winter Garden at Rose Bay, the Odeon at Manly and most disgracefully of all The Regent in George Street, where the property developer had purchased the structure cheaply, only to pull it down. Whole classes of buildings remained under threat.

— Peter Spearritt, 2016

Gaiety Theatre on Castlereagh Street in 1882

Historic preservation exists in Sydney and is overseen by the New South Wales State Heritage Register, established in 1999. Some of Sydney's grandest edifices have been replaced with contemporary architecture, a trend which began in the 1960s and has continued throughout to the present day. Lax heritage conservation in Sydney has attracted the ire of Sydneysiders, who are often in opposition to what government or local authorities want for the city, something seen recently with government contesting the heritage-status of the Sirius building at The Rocks. The demolition of the Regent Theatre on George Street in 1988, which had been slowly falling into disrepair, is a reflection of the shoddy heritage attitudes that persisted in the 20th-century, despite protests from Sydneysiders and pleas for green bans: the ornate Free Classical-style theatre was purchased cheaply by property developer Leon Fink, who subsequently demolished the building days after purchasing it. Sydney Mayor Clover Moore, then the MP for Bligh, addressed a crowd in Martin Place in 1988 to help save the building.

Another example of a recent demolition of a Sydney building was the loss of the head office of the Rural Bank at 52 Martin Place. The art deco building, designed in the 1930s by F.W. Turner, was controversially demolished in 1983 for a "modern" State Bank tower. Despite staunch public protest, building's design significance and a listing in the Australian Heritage Commission listing were unable to prevent it being destroyed. Articles in The Sydney Morning Herald on 2 February 1982 ran spreads about protecting the building at public meetings organised by the Australian Institute of Architects.

Another controversial demolition of a prominent Sydney building was Anthony Hordern & Sons, once Sydney's largest department store. The building was constructed in 1905 with an entrance in Italian marble in a Victorian style. The Anthony Hordern Brickfield Hill site, Palace Emporium, was subsequently used by the NSW Institute of Technology (now UTS) for some years. The emporium buildings were controversially demolished in 1986 for the World Square development, which remained a hole in the ground for nearly twenty years, before finally being completed in 2004. Despite the hugely contested and much lamented demolition, there are some legacies remaining in Sydney, such as the Hordern Pavilion, Hordern Towers (within the World Square development), and the Presbyterian Ladies' College in Croydon of which its oldest building, 'Shubra Hall' was the home of Anthony Hordern III until 1889.

...[Sydney]'s older architecture had seen little investment, or [the buildings] were being allowed to disintegrate until their destruction.

— Sydney, Delia Falconer

==== Notable lost buildings ====
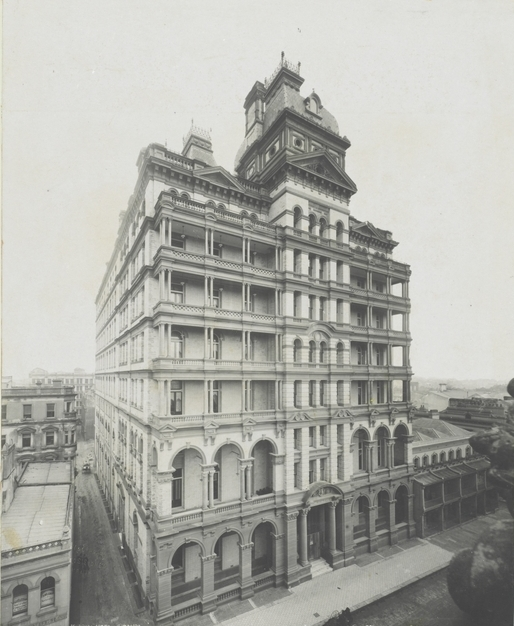
Hotel Metropole

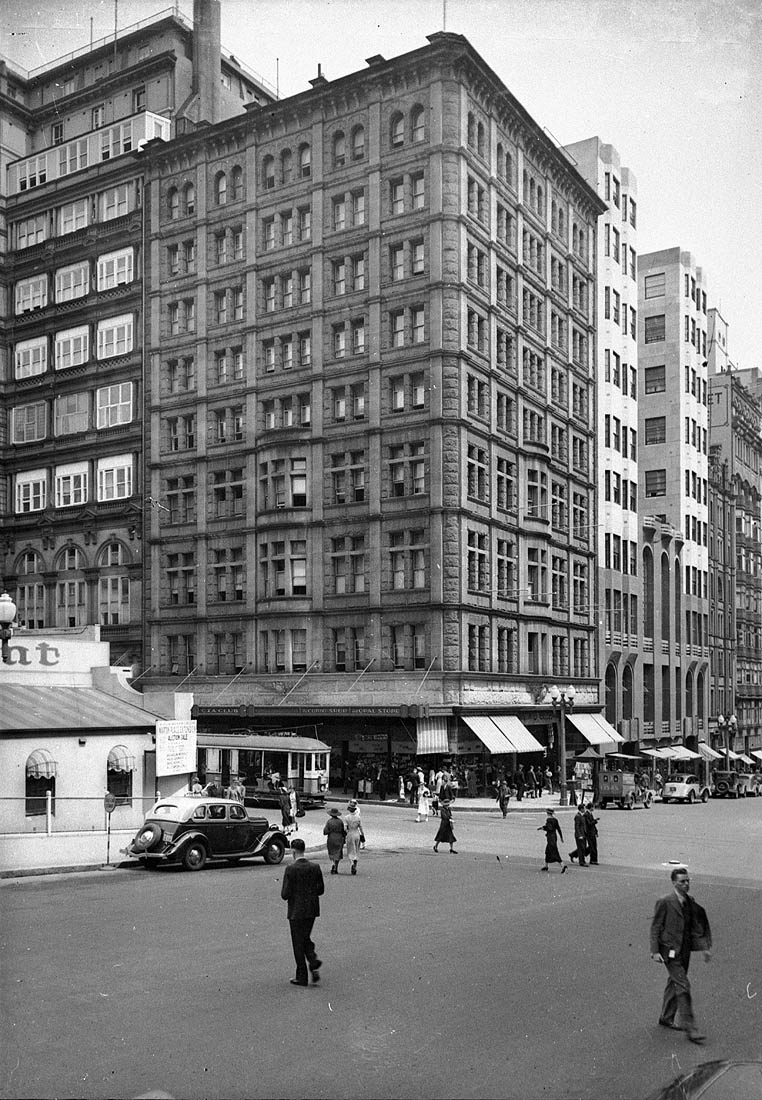
Commercial Travellers Club

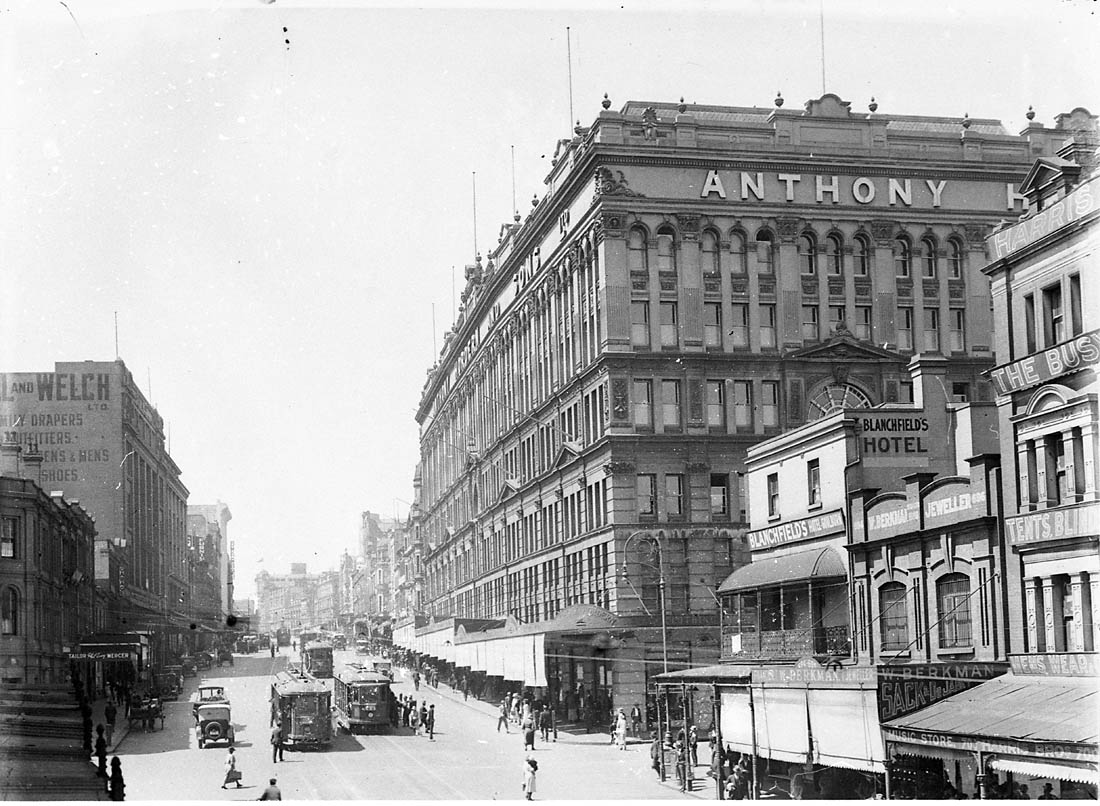
Anthony Hordern & Sons

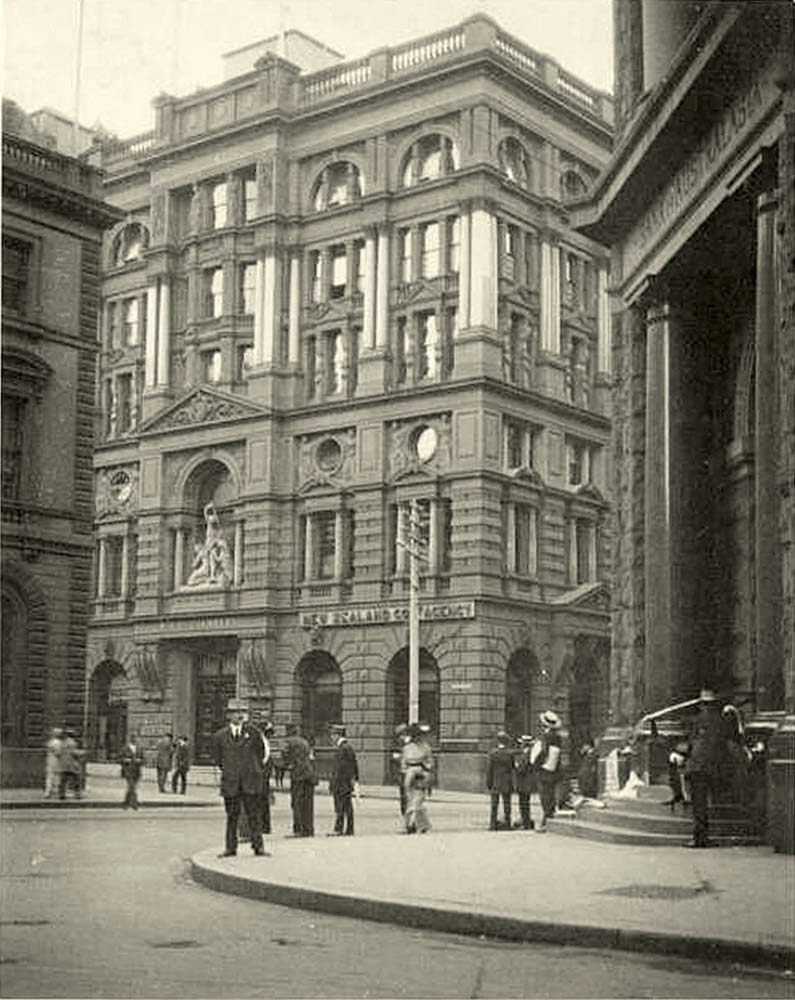
The Colonial Mutual Association Building in Sydney, corner of George and Wynyard Streets, circa 1900s.

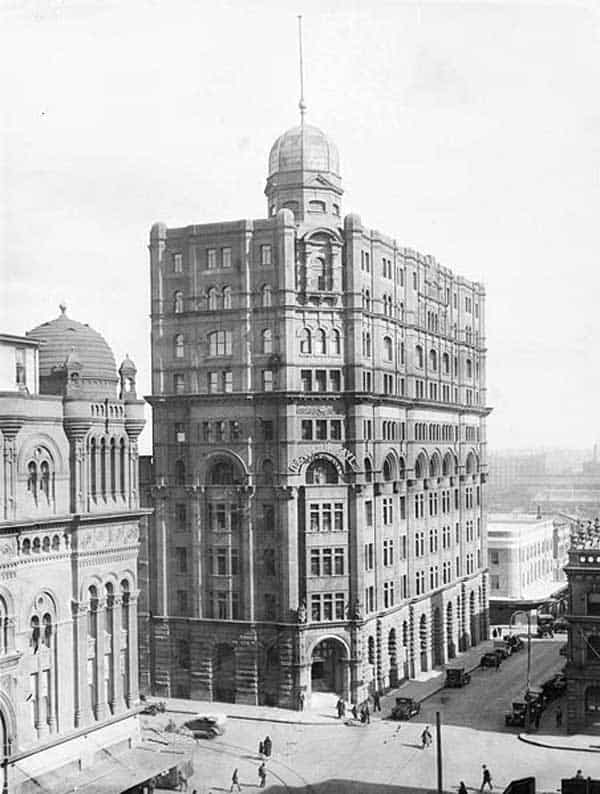
Henry Bull & Co. Building

== Prominent styles ==
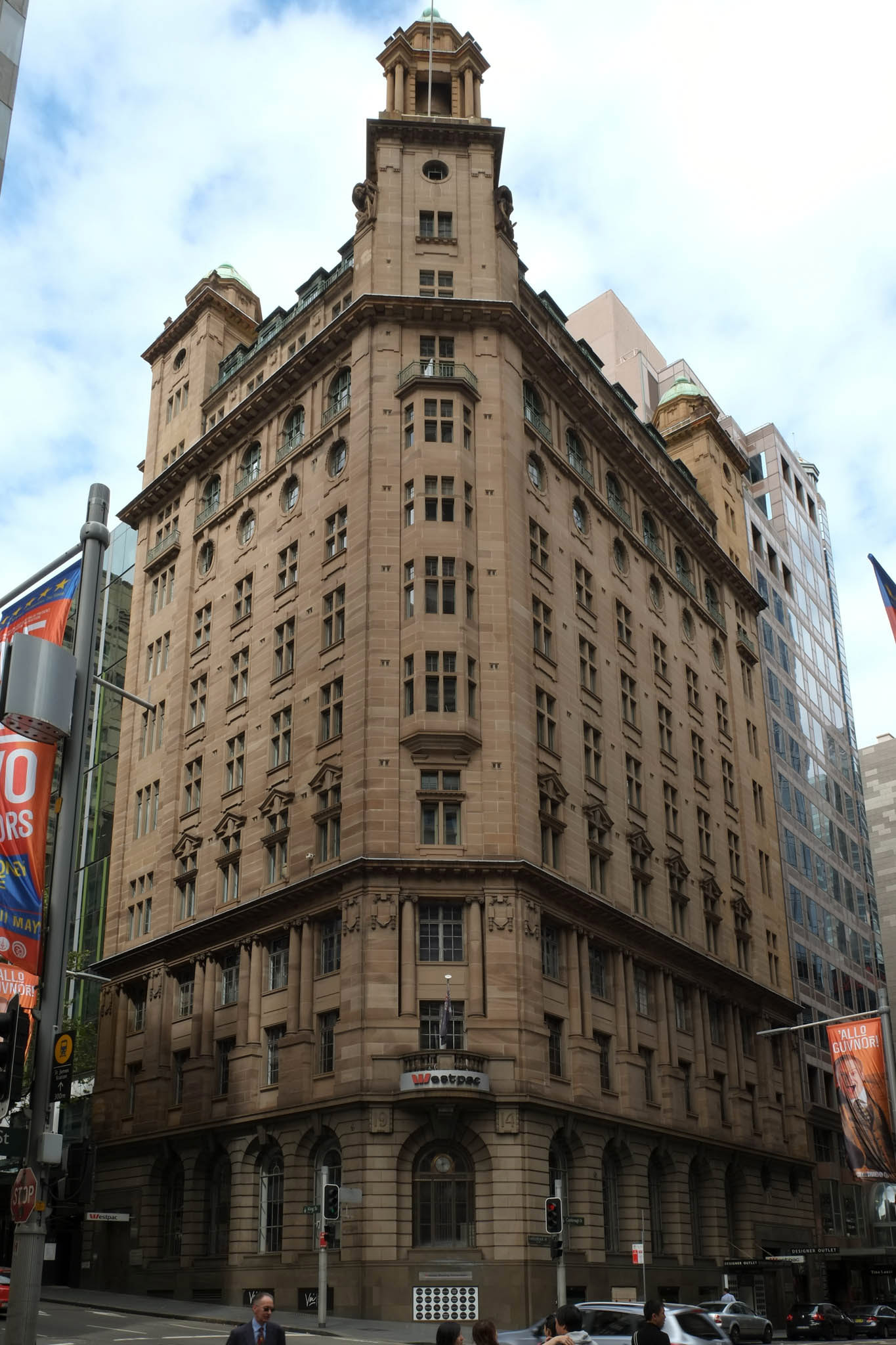
Inter-war Commercial Palazzo Trust Building

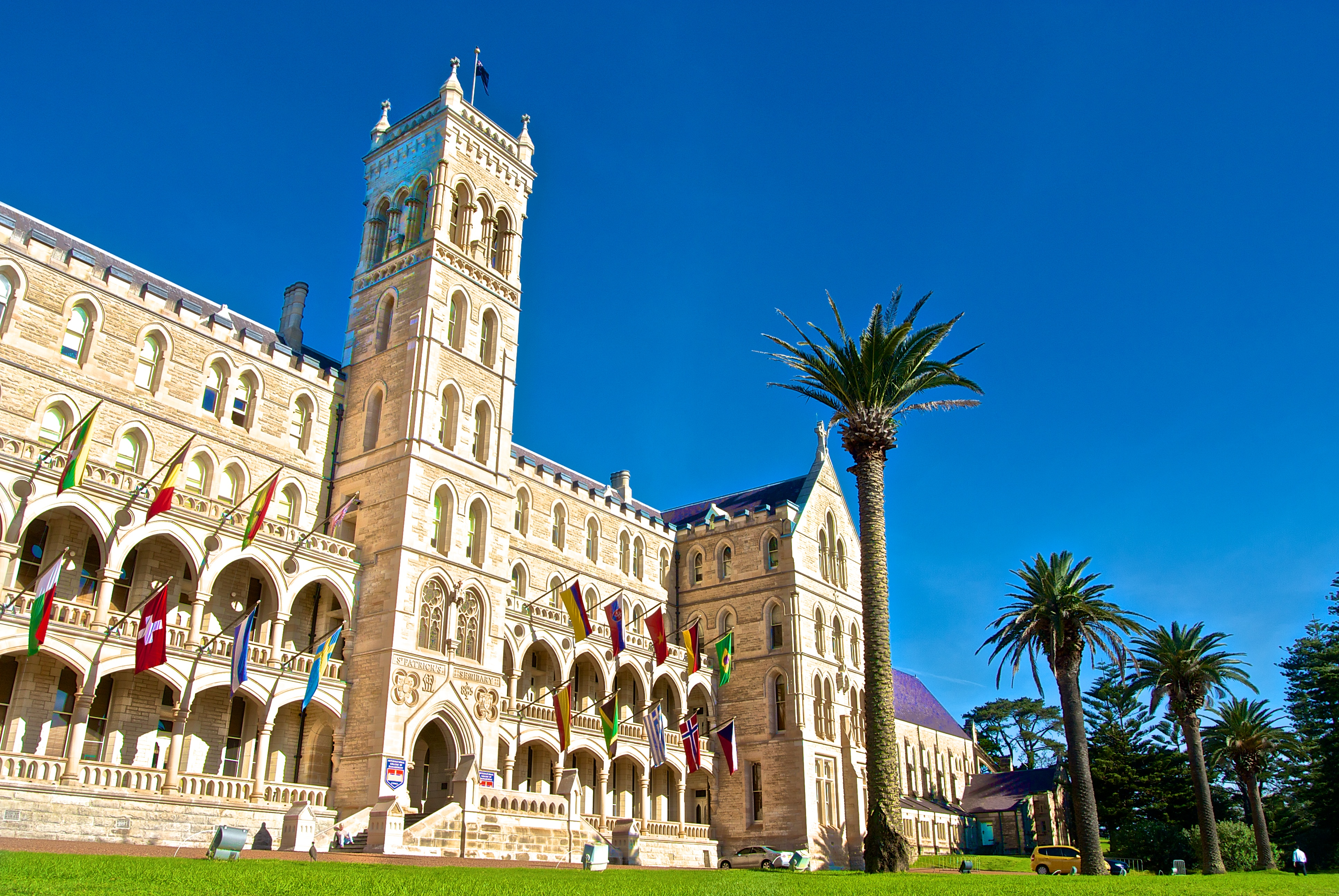
St Patrick's Seminary

=== Gothic Revival ===
- Government House, Bennelong Point
- St Philip's Church, Clarence Street
- Bishopscourt, Greenoaks Avenue, Darling Point
- The Abbey, Johnston Street, Annandale
- Gladeswood House, 11 Gladeswood Gardens, Double Bay
- St John's Church, Darlinghurst Road, Darlinghurst

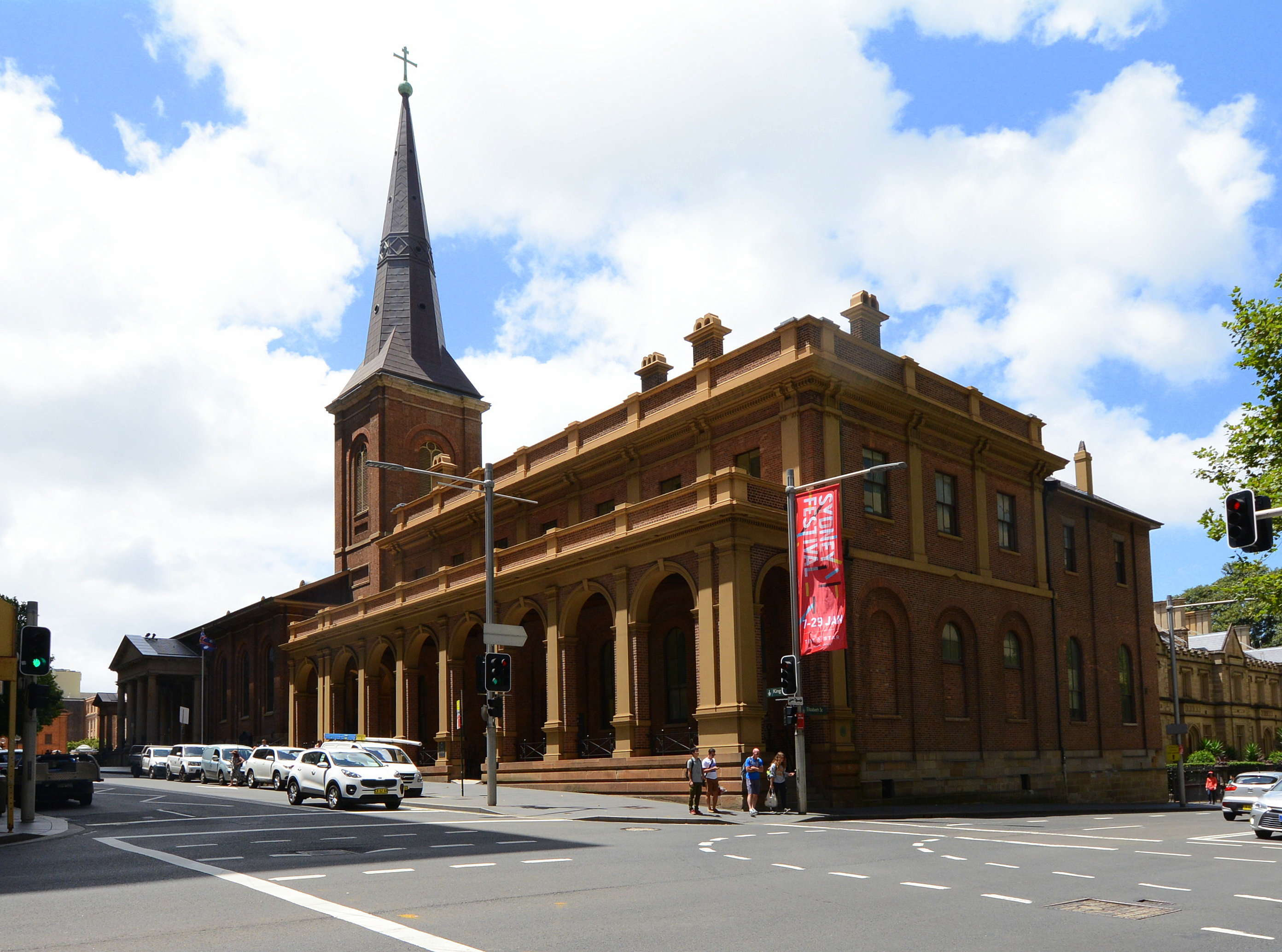
Georgian Greenway Wing (Supreme Court of New South Wales)

=== Georgian ===
- Durham Hall, Albion Street, Surry Hills
- Cleveland House, Bedford Street, Surry Hills
- Waimea, Waimea Avenue, Woollahra
- Judge's House, 531 Kent Street
- Juniper Hall, Oxford Street and Ormond Street, Paddington

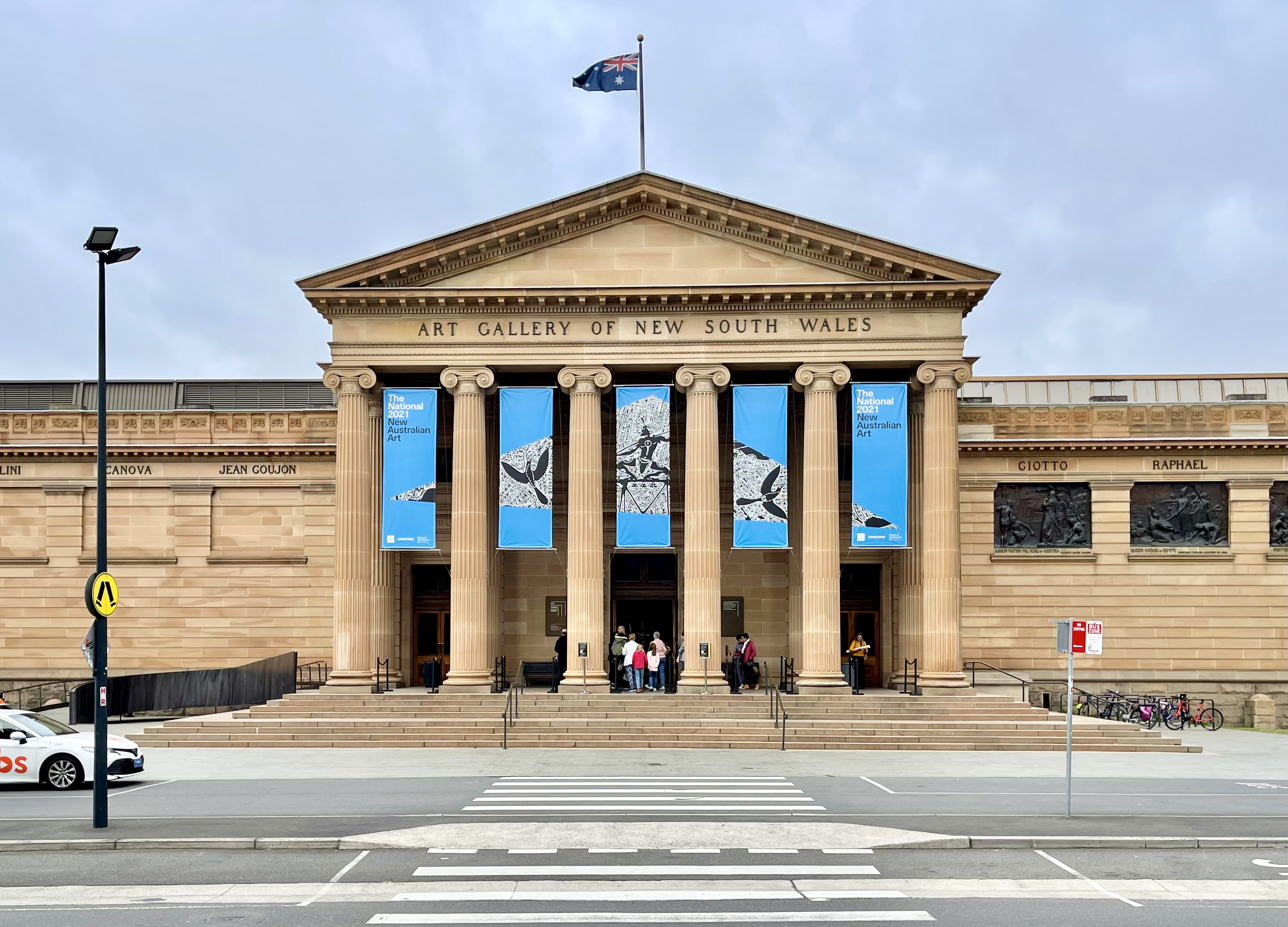
The Art Gallery of New South Wales in the Neoclassical style

=== Neoclassical ===
- Customs House, Alfred Street, Circular Quay
- General Post Office, Martin Place
- Department of Lands Building, Bridge Street
- Art Gallery of New South Wales, The Domain
- State Library of New South Wales, Macquarie Street
- Australian Museum, College Street
- Darlinghurst Court House, Taylor Square

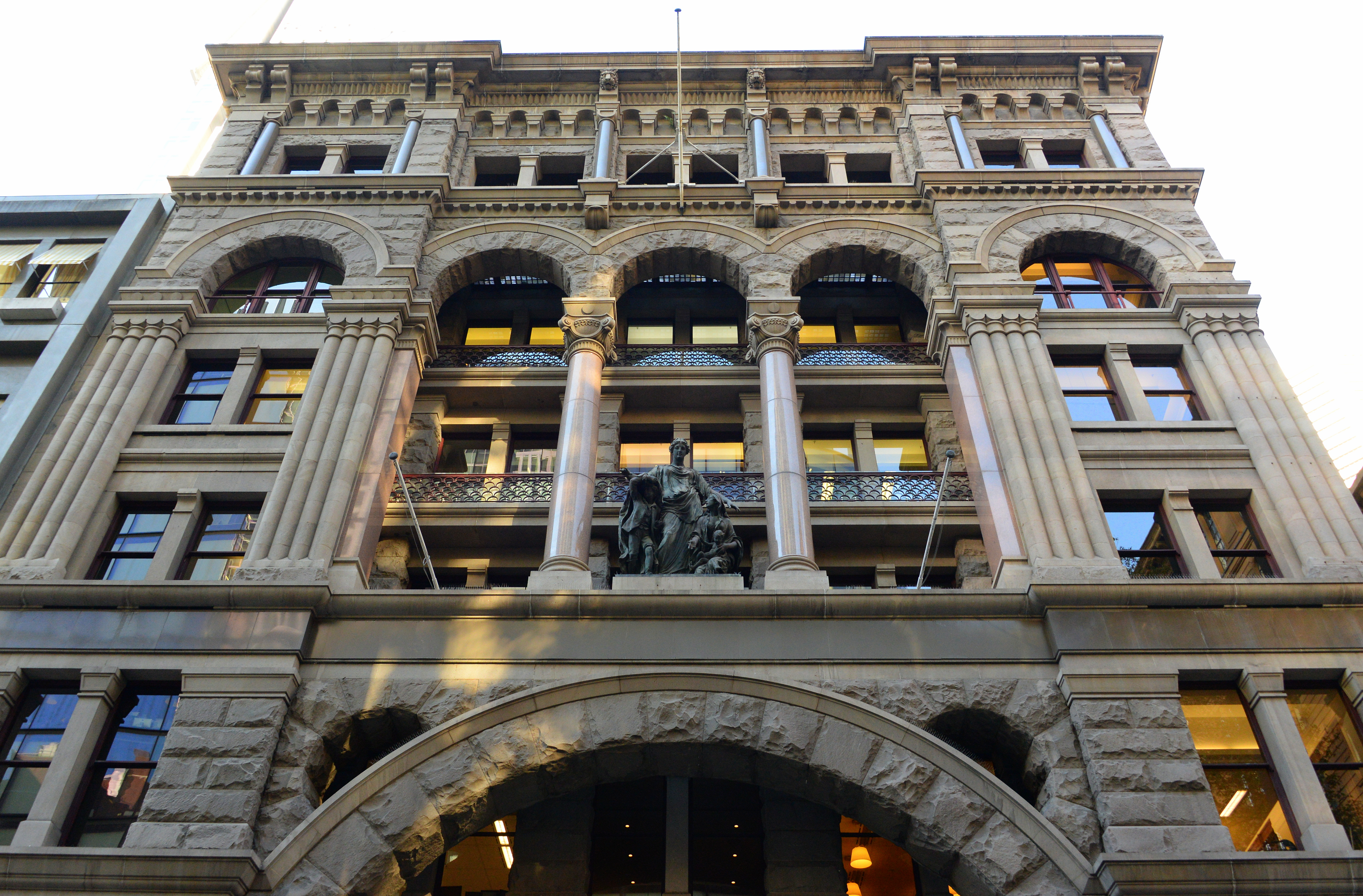
The Victorian Romanesque Societe Generale Building

=== Romanesque ===
- Queen Victoria Building, George Street
- Church of St John, Bishopthorpe, St Johns Road, Glebe
- Société Générale House, 348 George Street (originally the Equitable Life Assurance Society of America)
- Burns Philp Building, Bridge Street
- St Andrew's Church, 56 Raglan Street, Manly
- Boothtown Aqueduct, Macquarie Road, Greystanes

=== Italianate ===
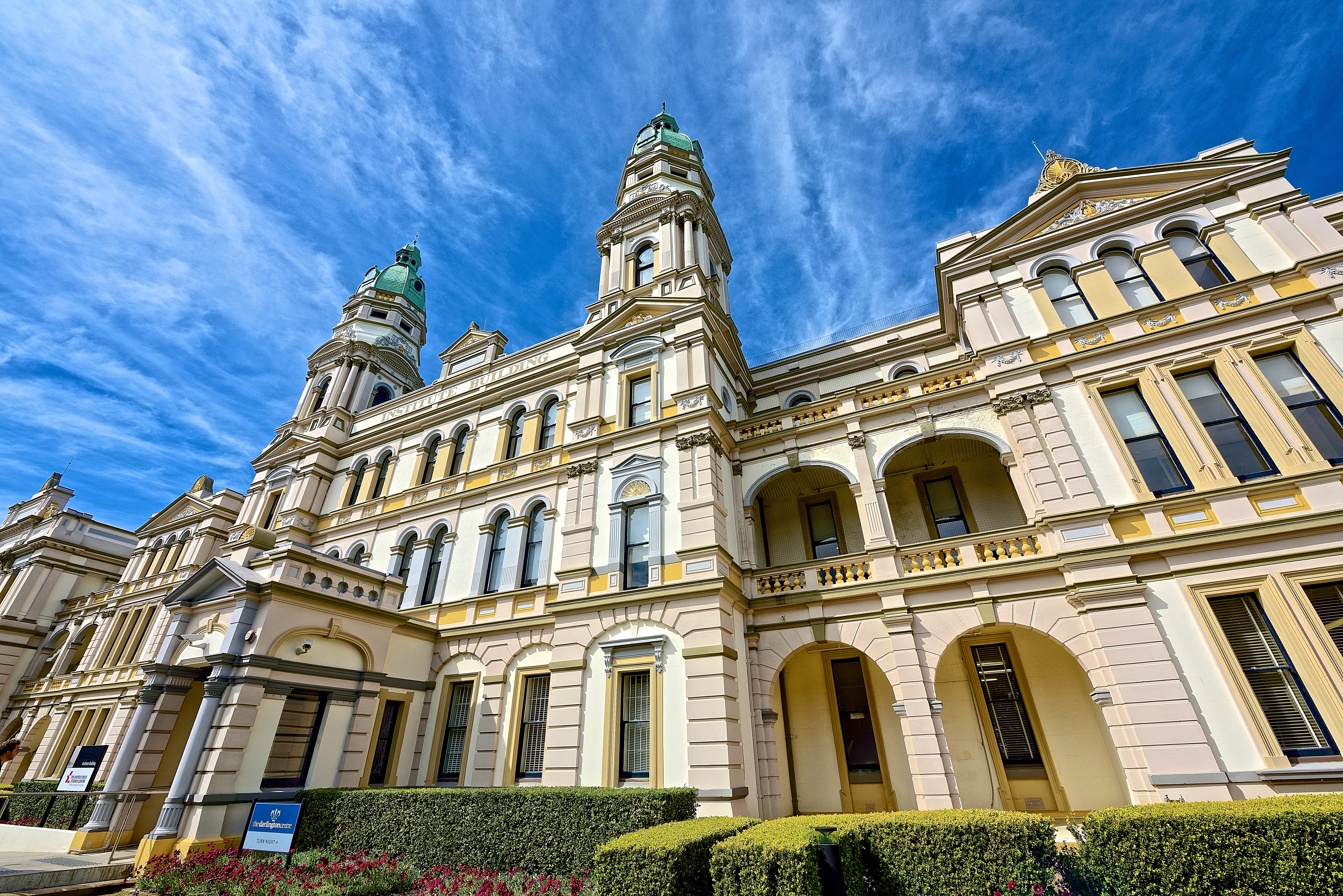
The Institute Building, in the Italianate style

- Central Police Court, Liverpool Street
- Former New South Wales Club, 31 Bligh Street
- Chief Secretary's Building, Bridge Street
- Holyrood (facade), Santa Sabina College, The Boulevarde, Strathfield
- Rockwall, Macleay Street, Potts Point
- Stead House, Leicester Street, Marrickville

=== Federation/Edwardian ===
- Pyrmont Fire Station, Gipps Street and Pyrmont Bridge Road, Pyrmont
- YMCA, 325 Pitt Street
- Former ANZ Bank, 52 Oxford Street, Darlinghurst
- Former hotel, 2-4 Riley Street, Woolloomooloo
- Hotel building, 225 George Street
- Commercial Building, 161 Sussex Street
- Post Office, King Street and Erskineville Road, Newtown
- Commercial building, 469 Oxford Street, Paddington
- Bankstown Reservoir, 300 Hume Highway, Bankstown

=== Second Empire ===
- Sydney Town Hall, George Street
- Downing Centre (former Mark Foy building), Liverpool Street

=== Queen Anne ===
- Westmaling, Penshurst Avenue, Penshurst
- Caerleon, Bellevue Hill
- Homes, Appian Way, Burwood

== Skyscrapers ==
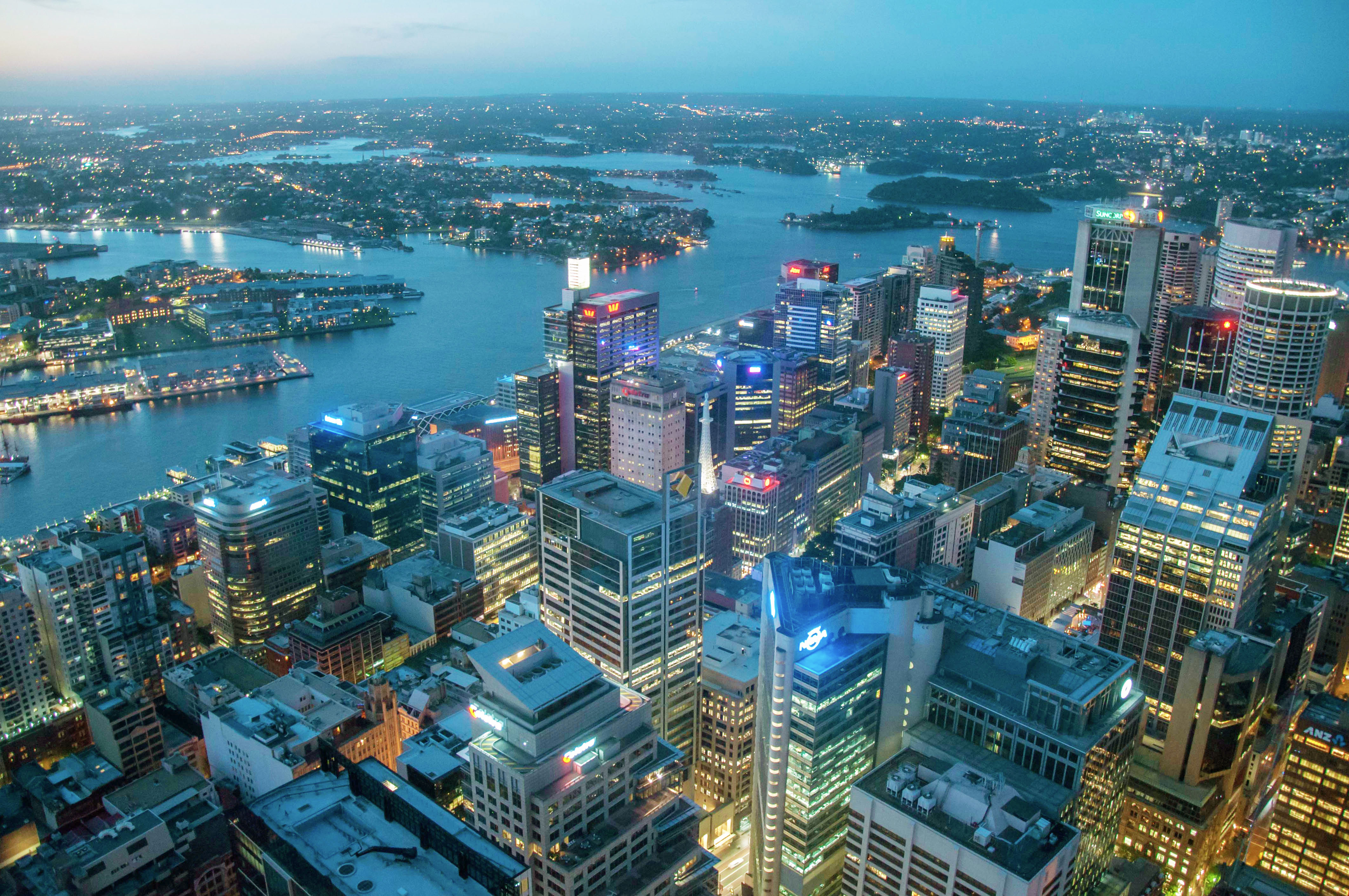
The northwestern part of the CBD viewed from Sydney Tower

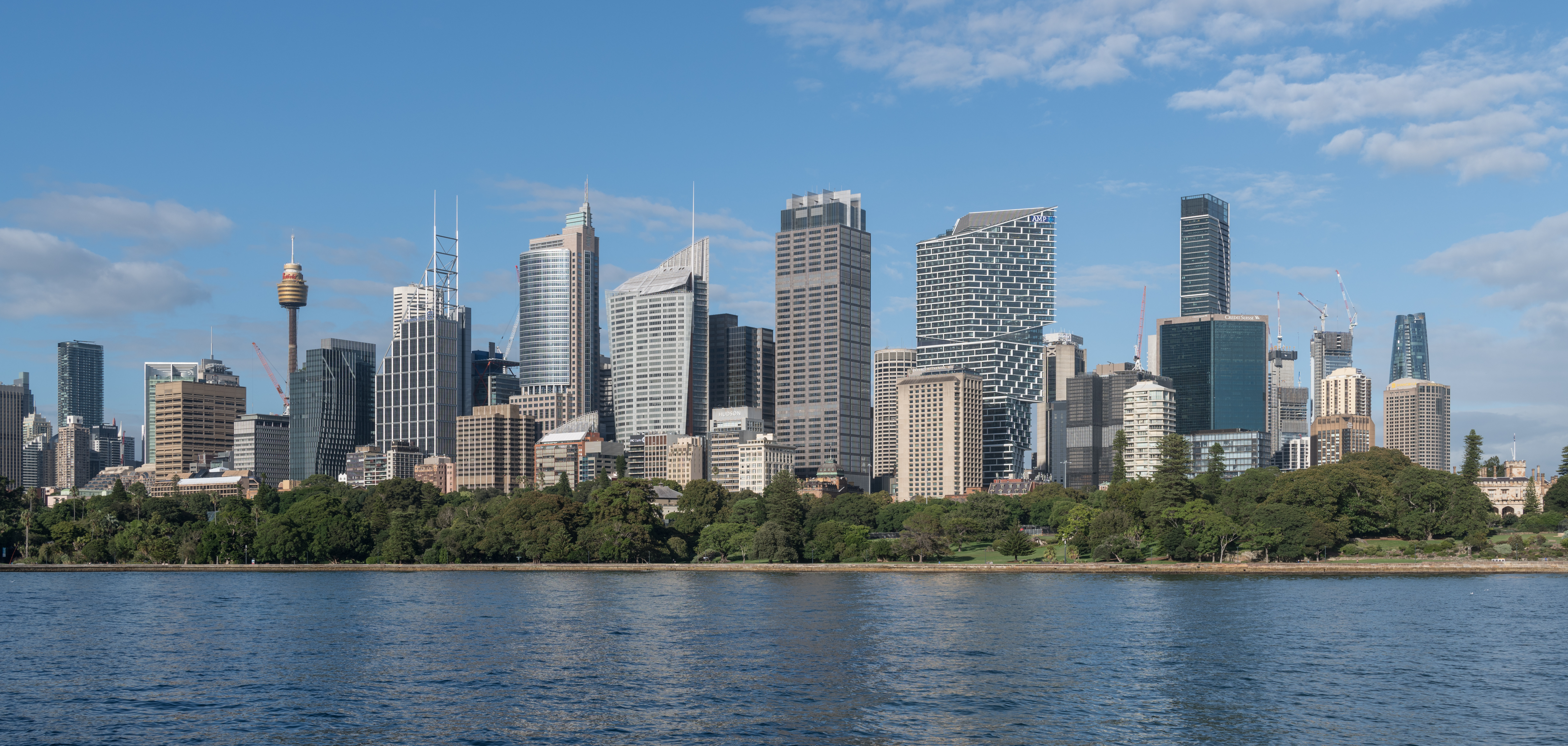
View of several of Sydney's tallest skyscrapers from the east

With 146 high-rise buildings over 90m, Sydney has the largest skyline in Australia. Height restrictions were lifted in the 1950s and the AMP Building at Circular Quay became Australia's tallest building several years later. The late 1980s and early to mid-1990s saw a skyscraper boom in Sydney, but height restrictions limited future buildings to the height of 235 metres, in part due to the close proximity of Sydney Airport. The largest structure is Centrepoint Tower standing at 309 metres, containing restaurants and observation decks. Although both the MLC Centre and World Tower are higher measured to roof at 228m and 230m respectively, the tallest conventional skyscraper measured to its spire tip is the Citigroup Centre at 243m, completed in 2000. Crown Sydney, in Barangaroo, surpassed all of these buildings (with the exception of Sydney Tower) upon its completion in 2020 as Sydney's tallest building at 271.3 m (890 ft).

=== Tallest buildings ===
- Crown Sydney 271m
- Citigroup Centre 243m
- Chifley Tower 241m
- Deutsche Bank Place 240m
- Meriton World Tower 230m
- MLC Centre 228m
- Governor Phillip Tower 227m
- Ernst and Young Tower 222m
- RBS Tower 219m
- ANZ Tower 195m
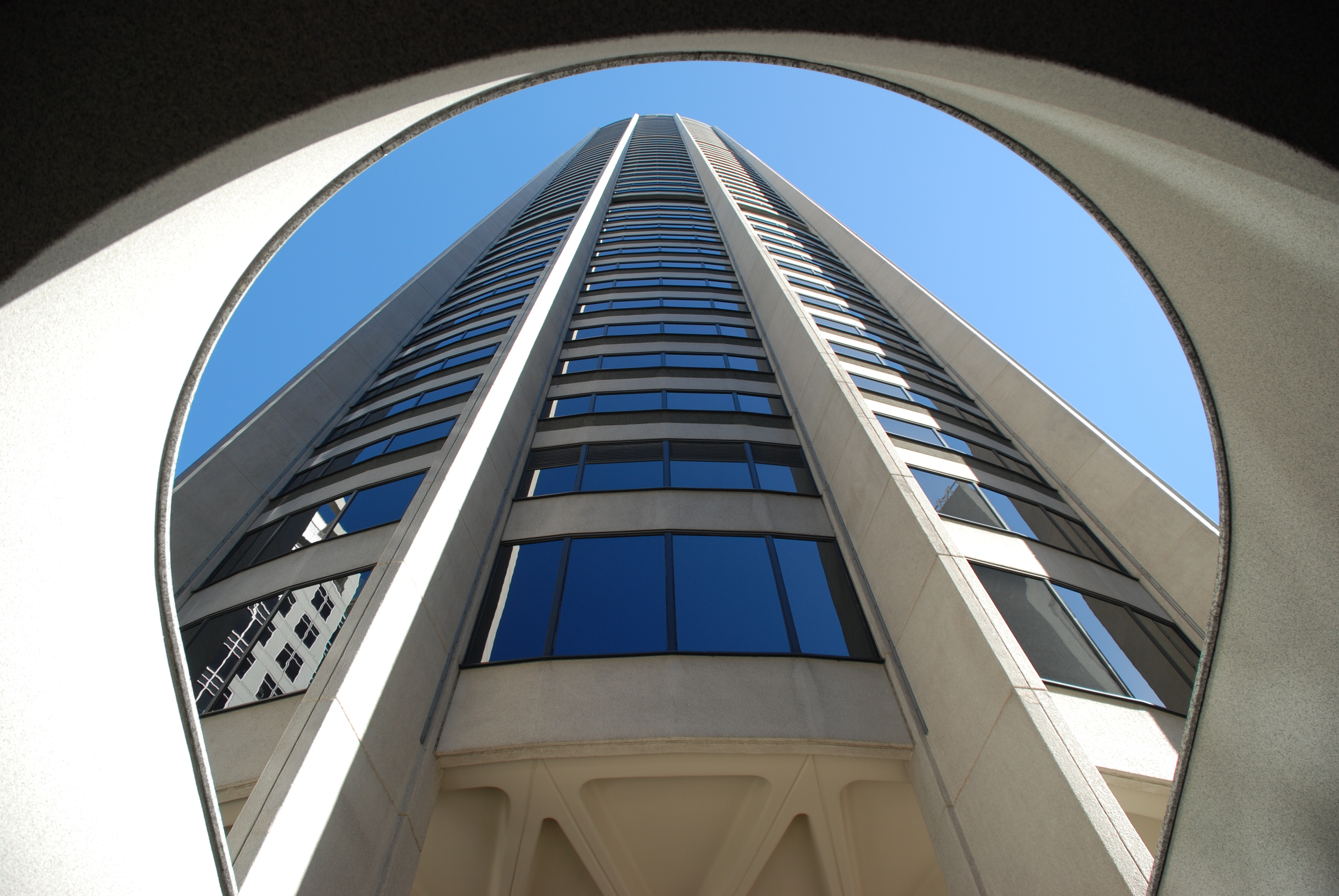
Australia Square

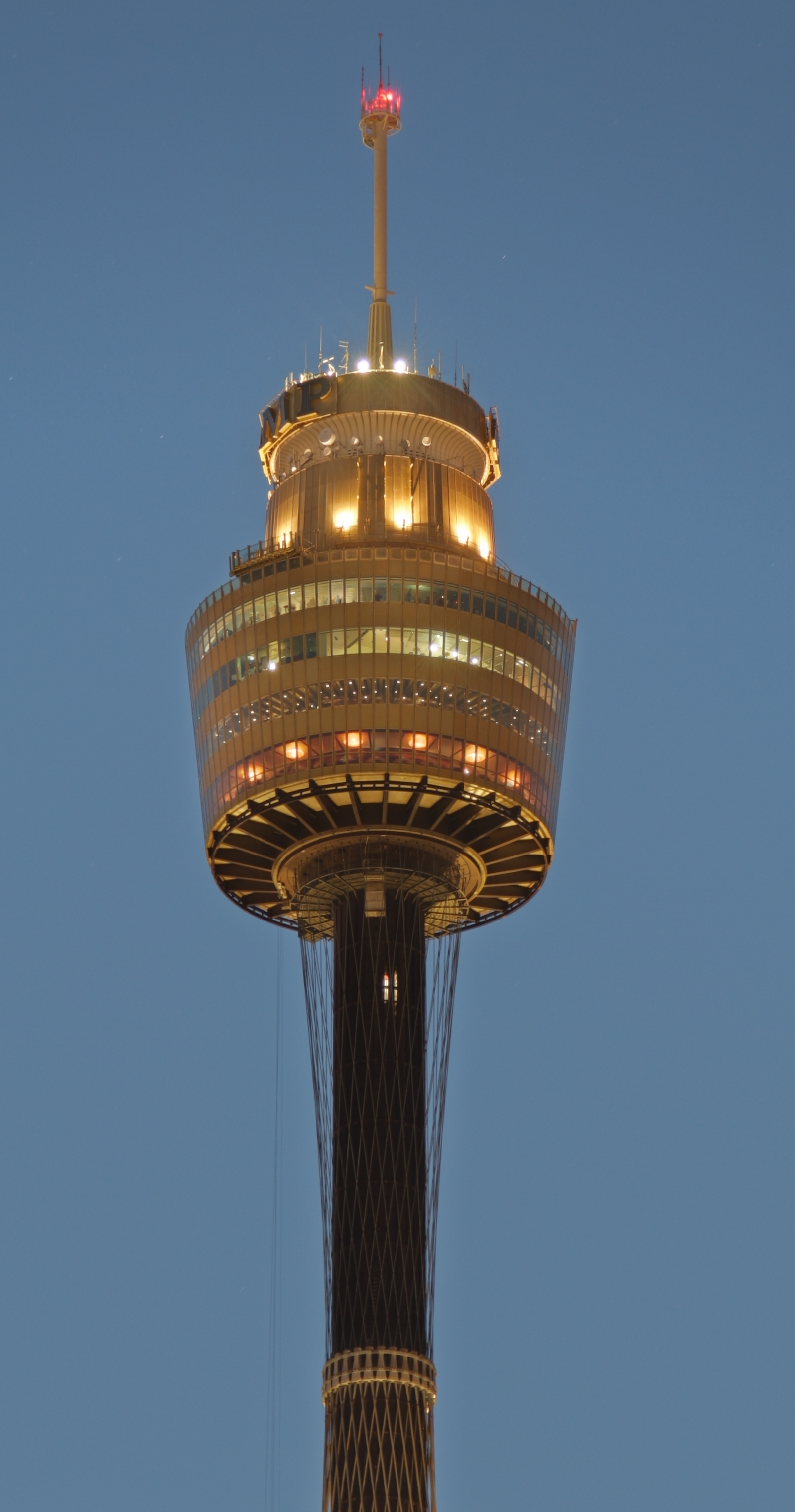
Sydney Tower

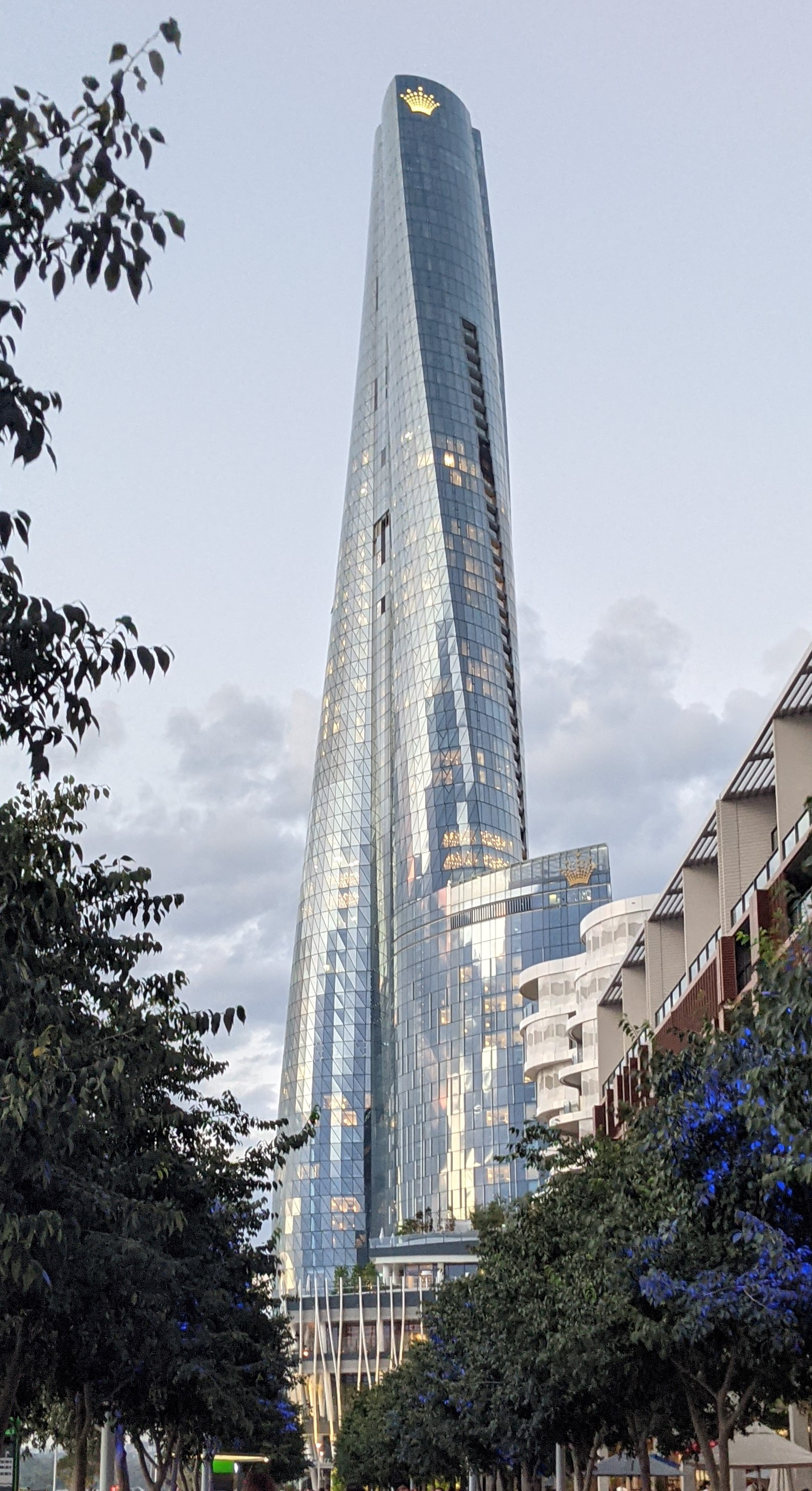
Crown Sydney

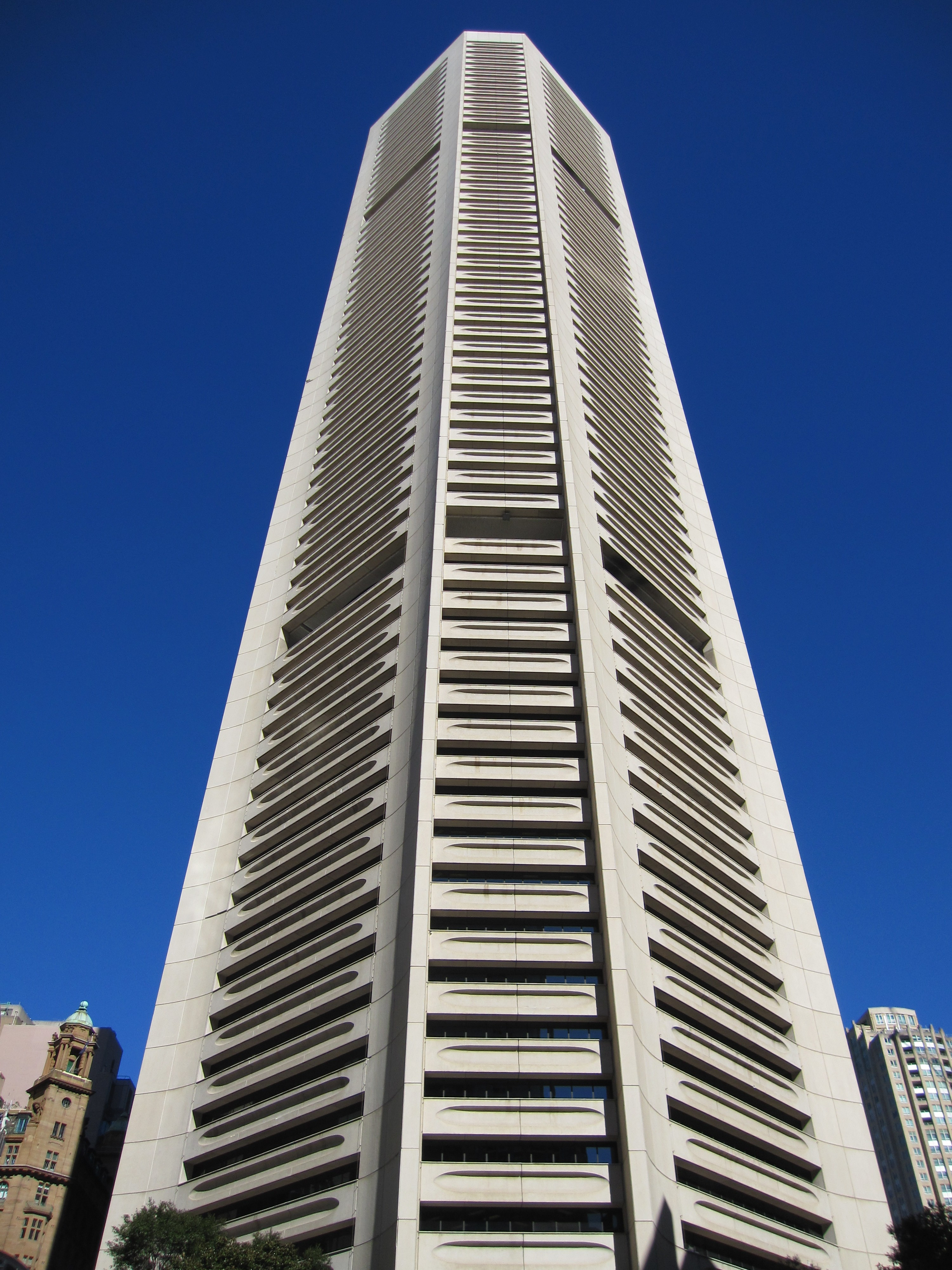
25 Martin Place

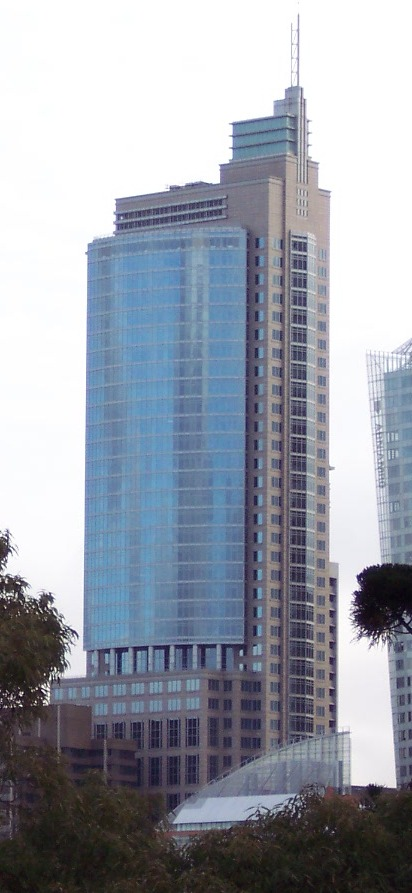
Chifley Tower

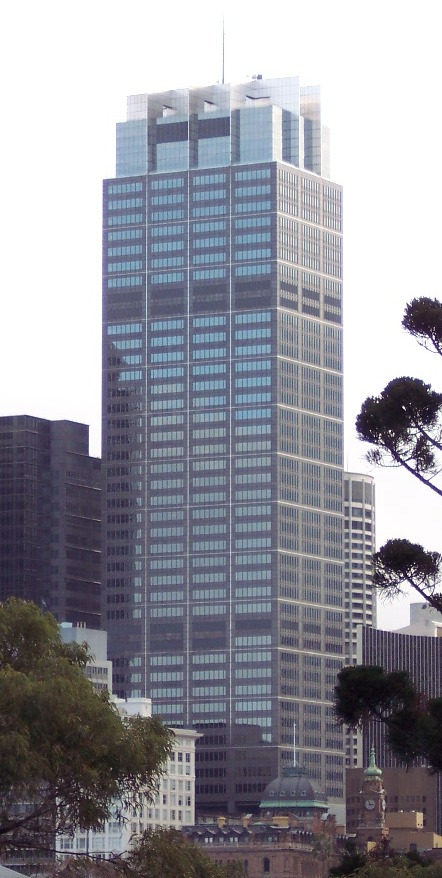
Governor Phillip Tower

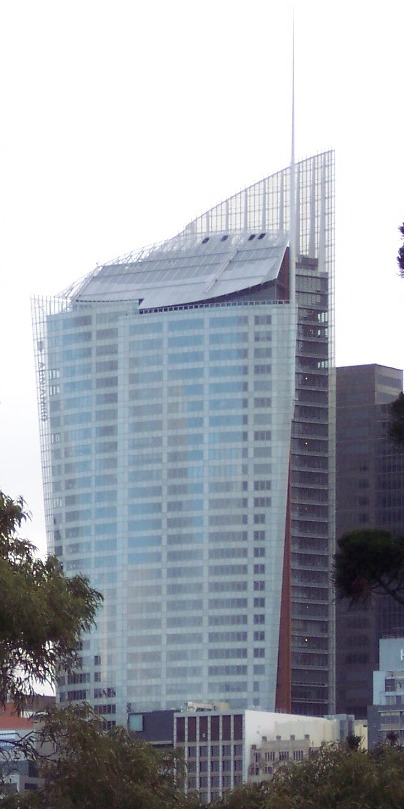
Aurora Place

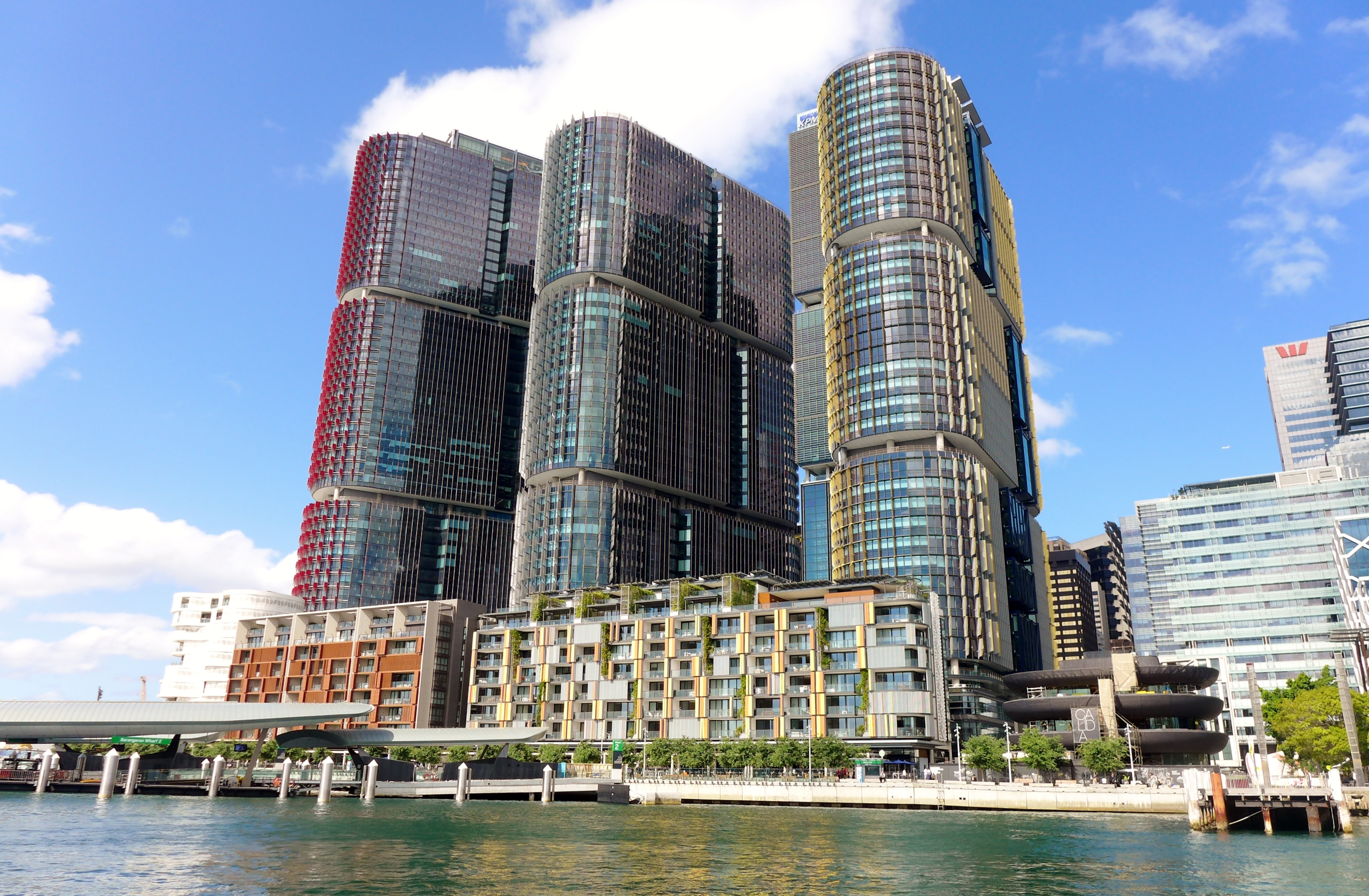
International Towers

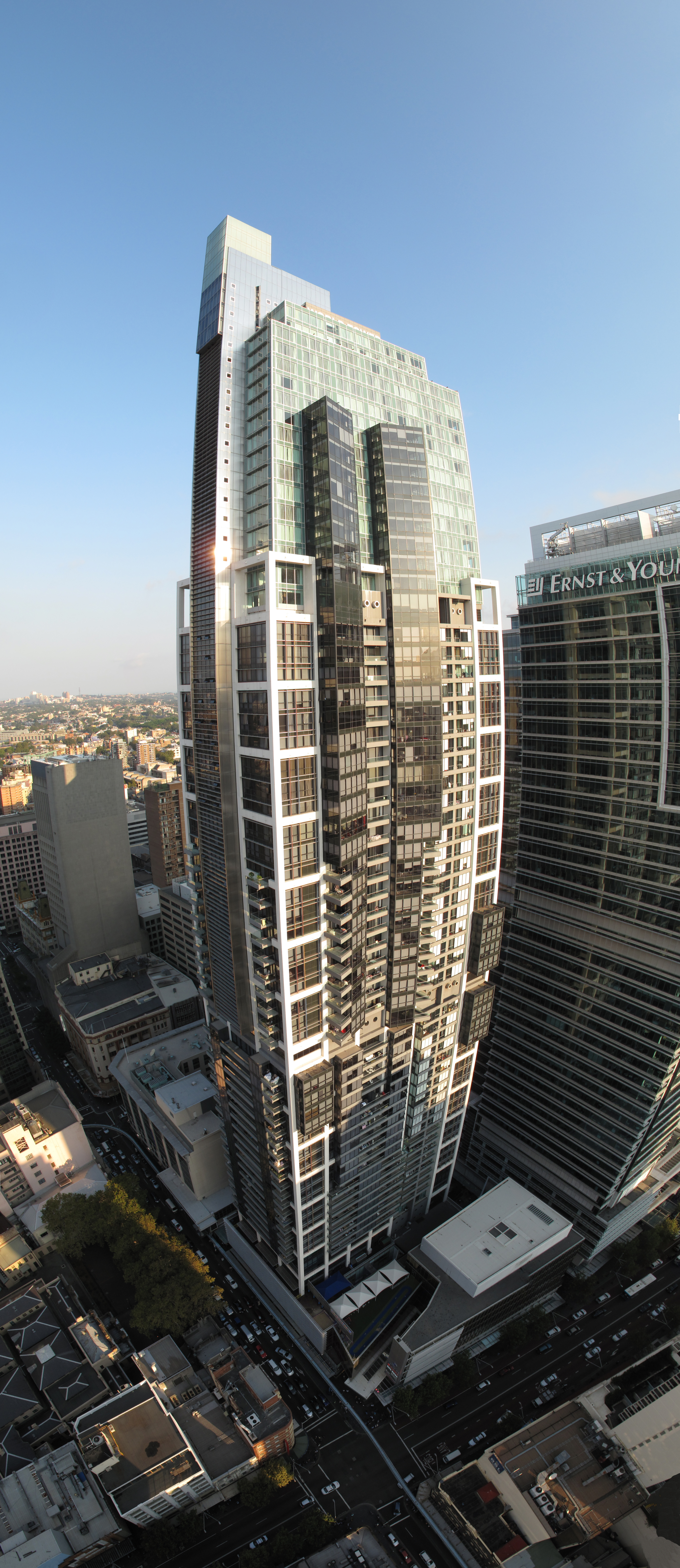
World Square

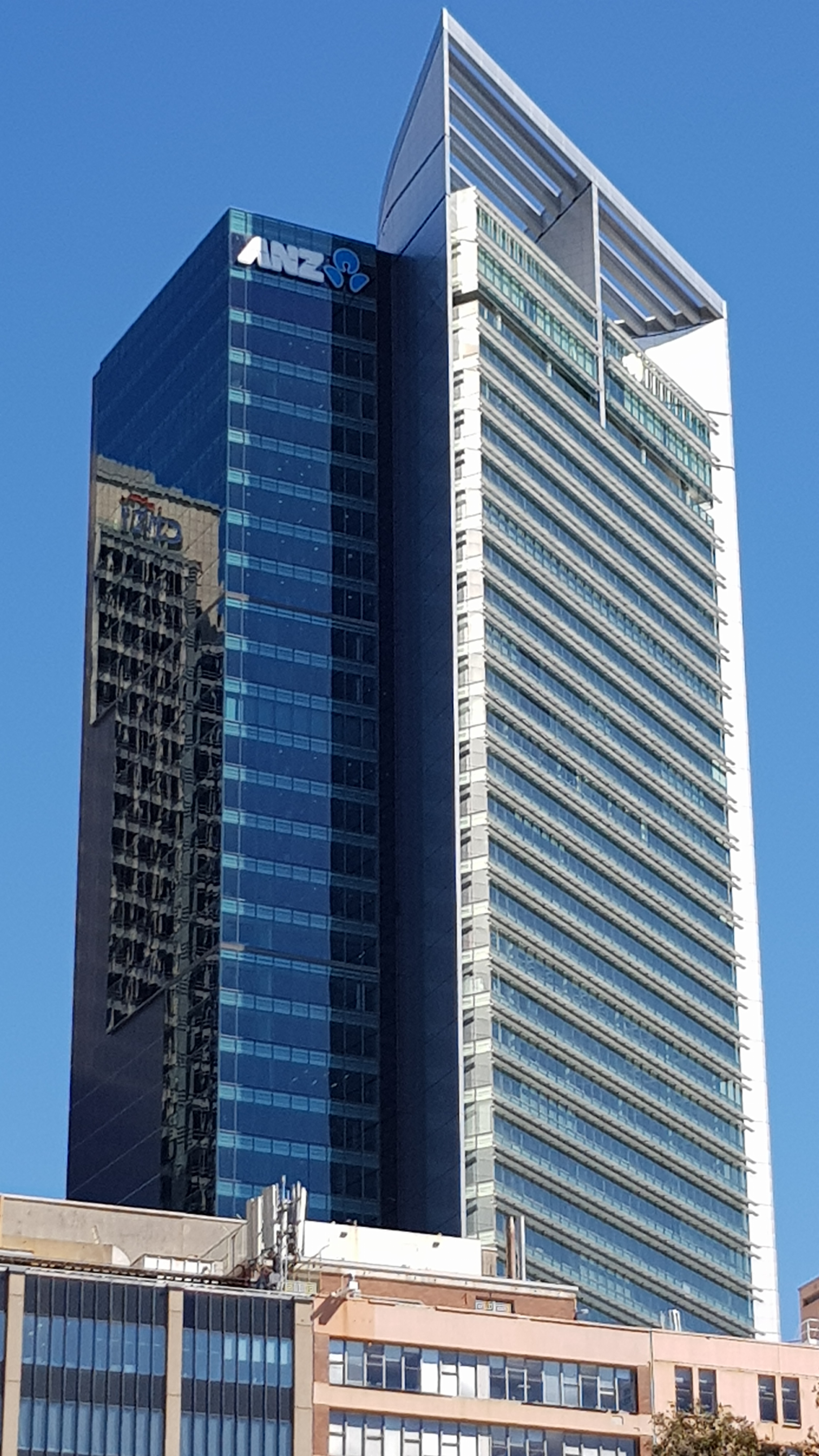
ANZ Centre

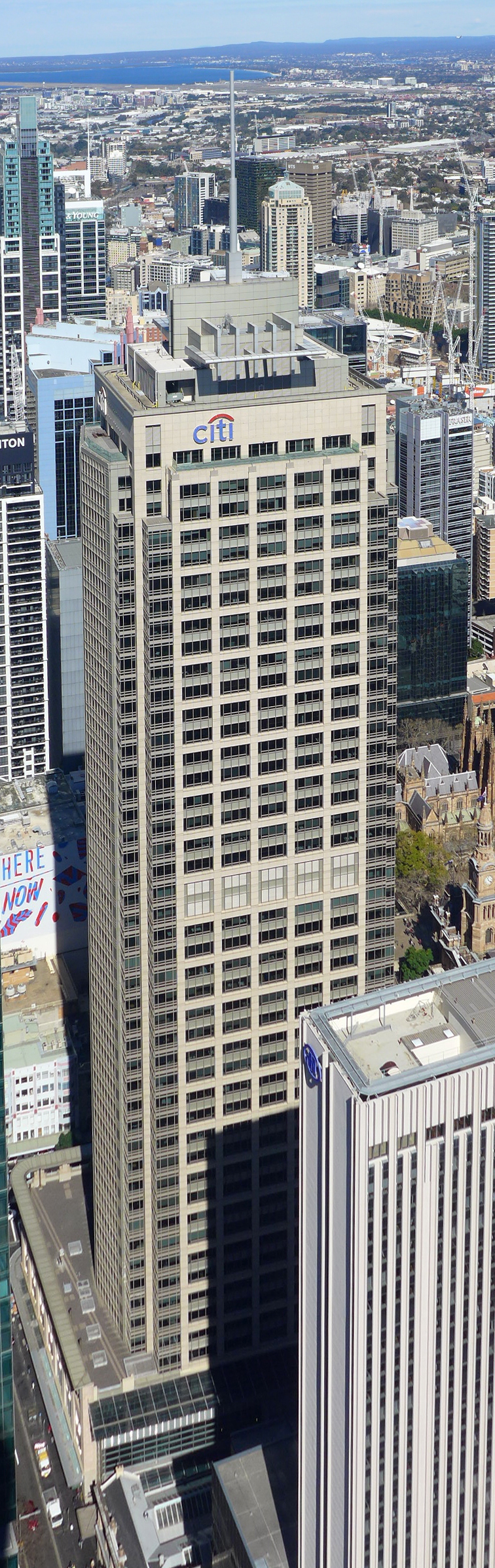
Citigroup Centre

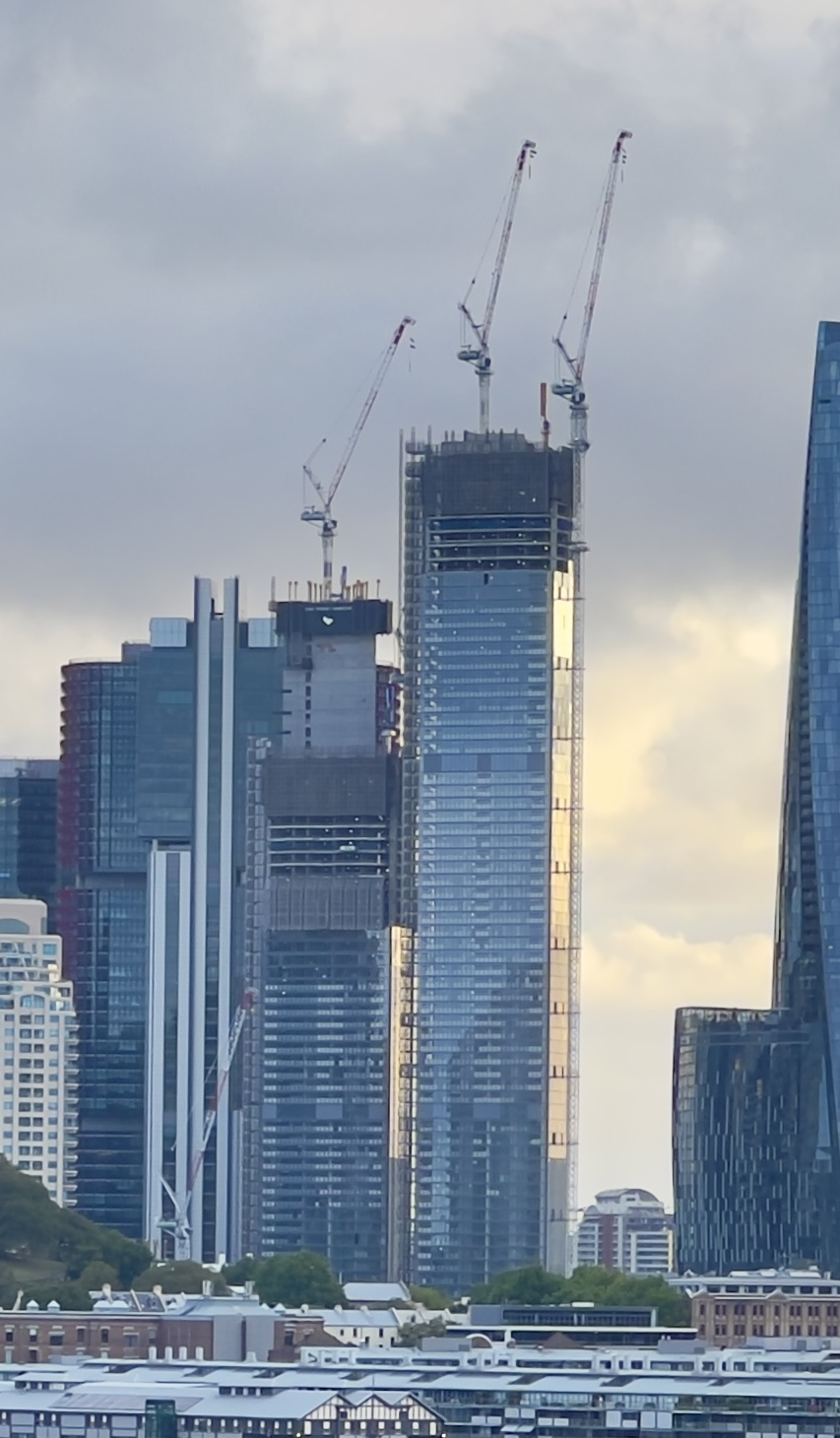
One Sydney Harbour under construction in December 2022

== Bridges ==
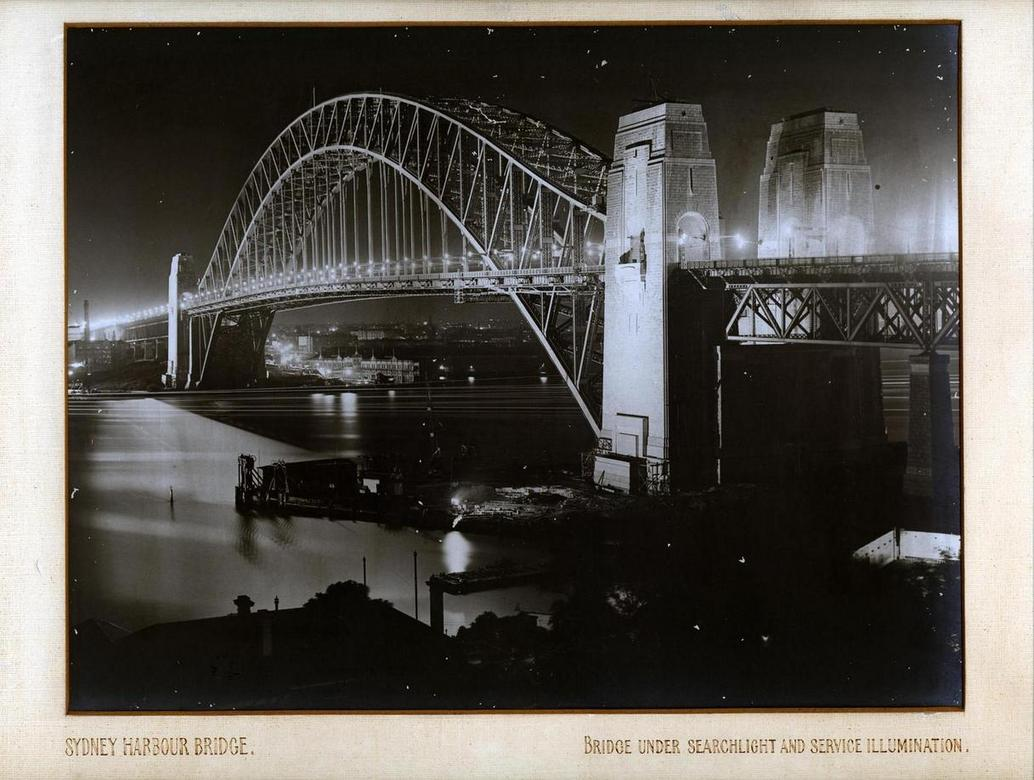
The Sydney Harbour Bridge after its opening in 1932. The bridge is one of the largest steel arch bridges in the world, spans Port Jackson, the largest natural harbour in the world.

There are 23 major bridges within Sydney. There are no significant suspension bridges. Instead, there is a mix of more modest girder, truss and cable bridges. The most iconic bridge in the city, the through arch Sydney Harbour Bridge, links the North Shore with the CBD across Port Jackson. The design was influenced by New York City's Hell Gate Bridge. It is the sixth longest spanning-arch bridge in the world and the tallest steel arch bridge, measuring 134 m (440 ft) from top to water level. The Anzac Bridge is an 8-lane cable-stayed bridge spanning Johnstons Bay between Pyrmont and Glebe Island.

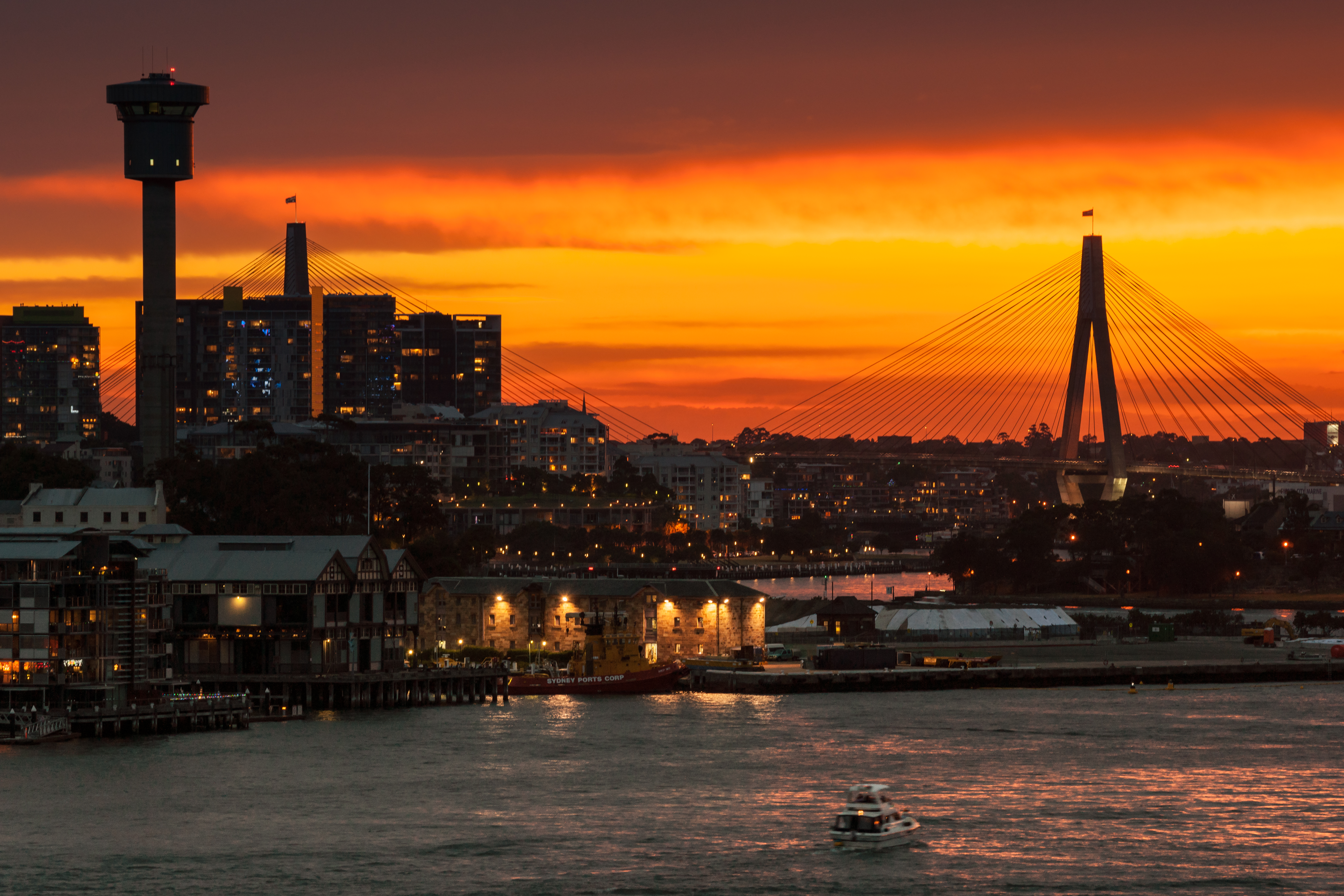
Anzac Bridge from Rozelle

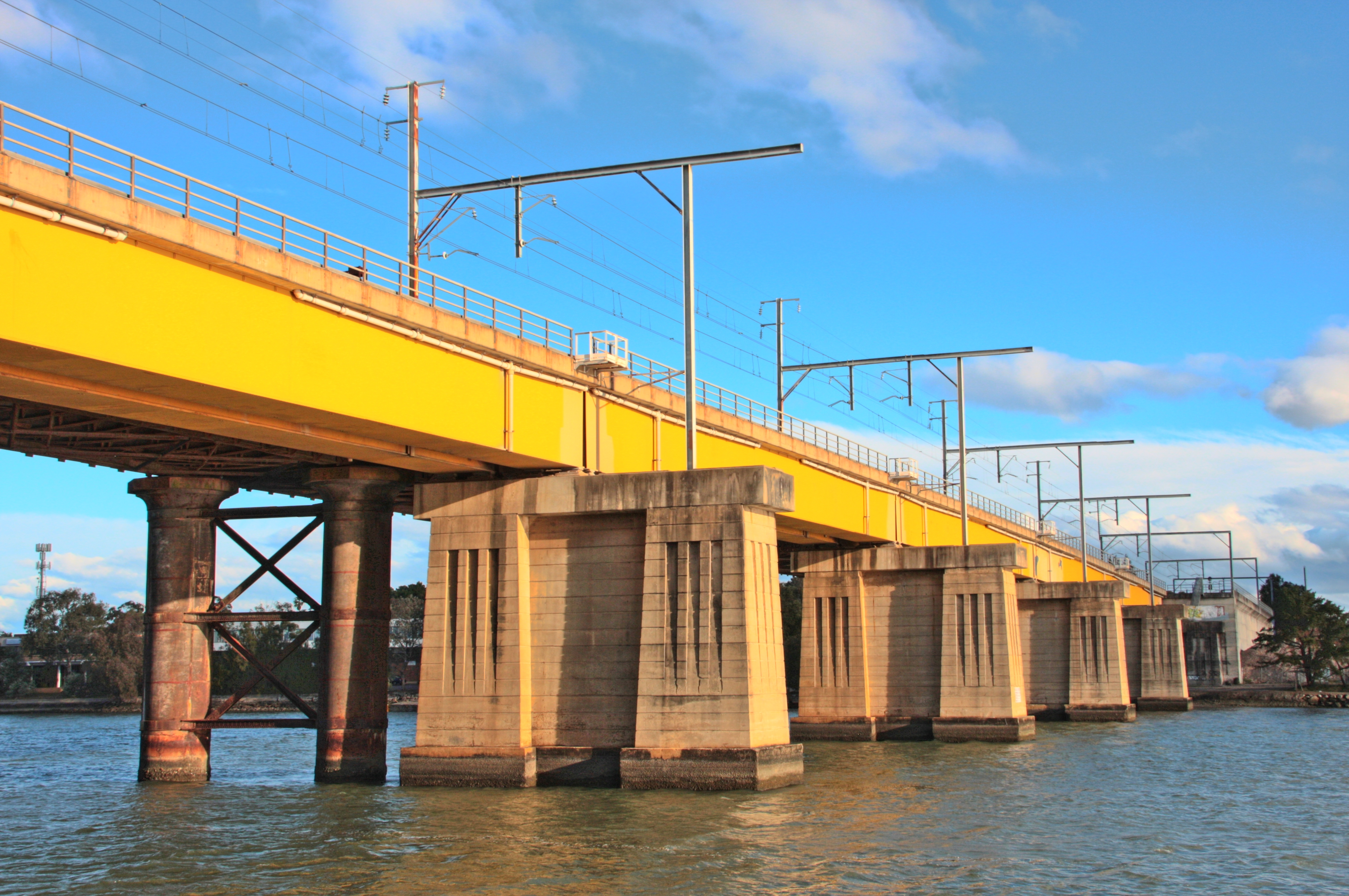
John Whitton Bridge

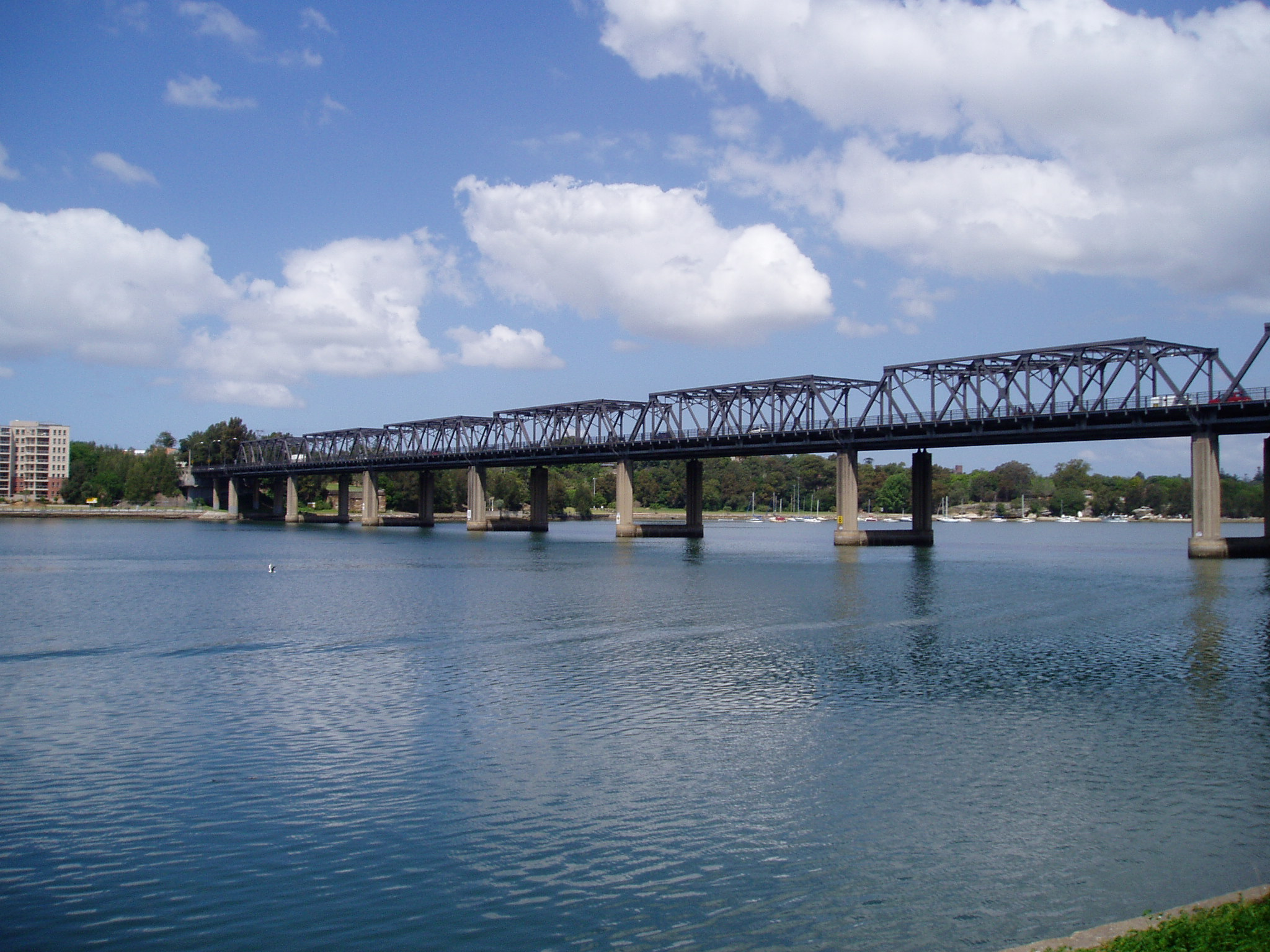
A full view of Iron Cove Bridge, which crosses Iron Cove Bay on the Parramatta River

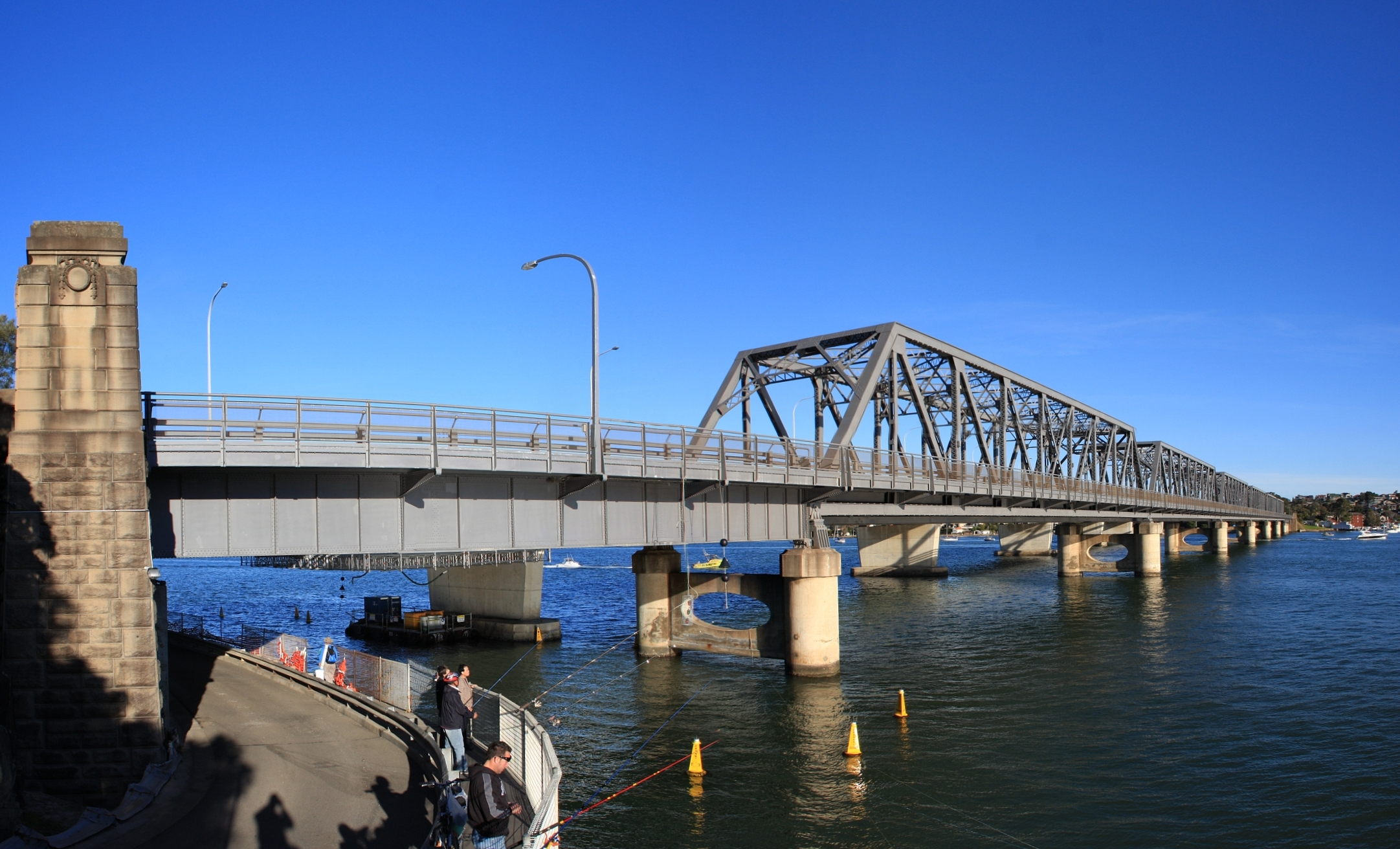
Tom Uglys Bridge, crossing Georges River

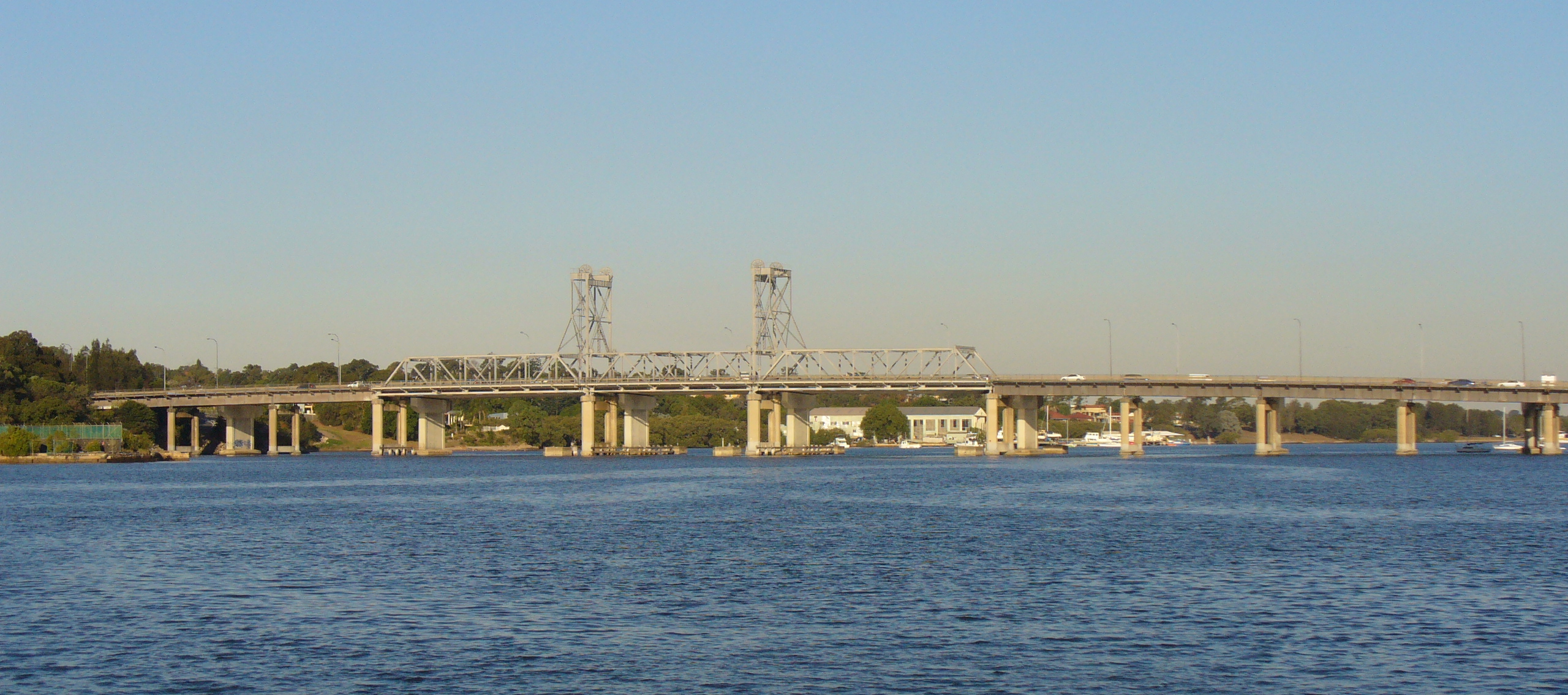
Ryde Bridge from Meadowbank

== Residential architecture ==
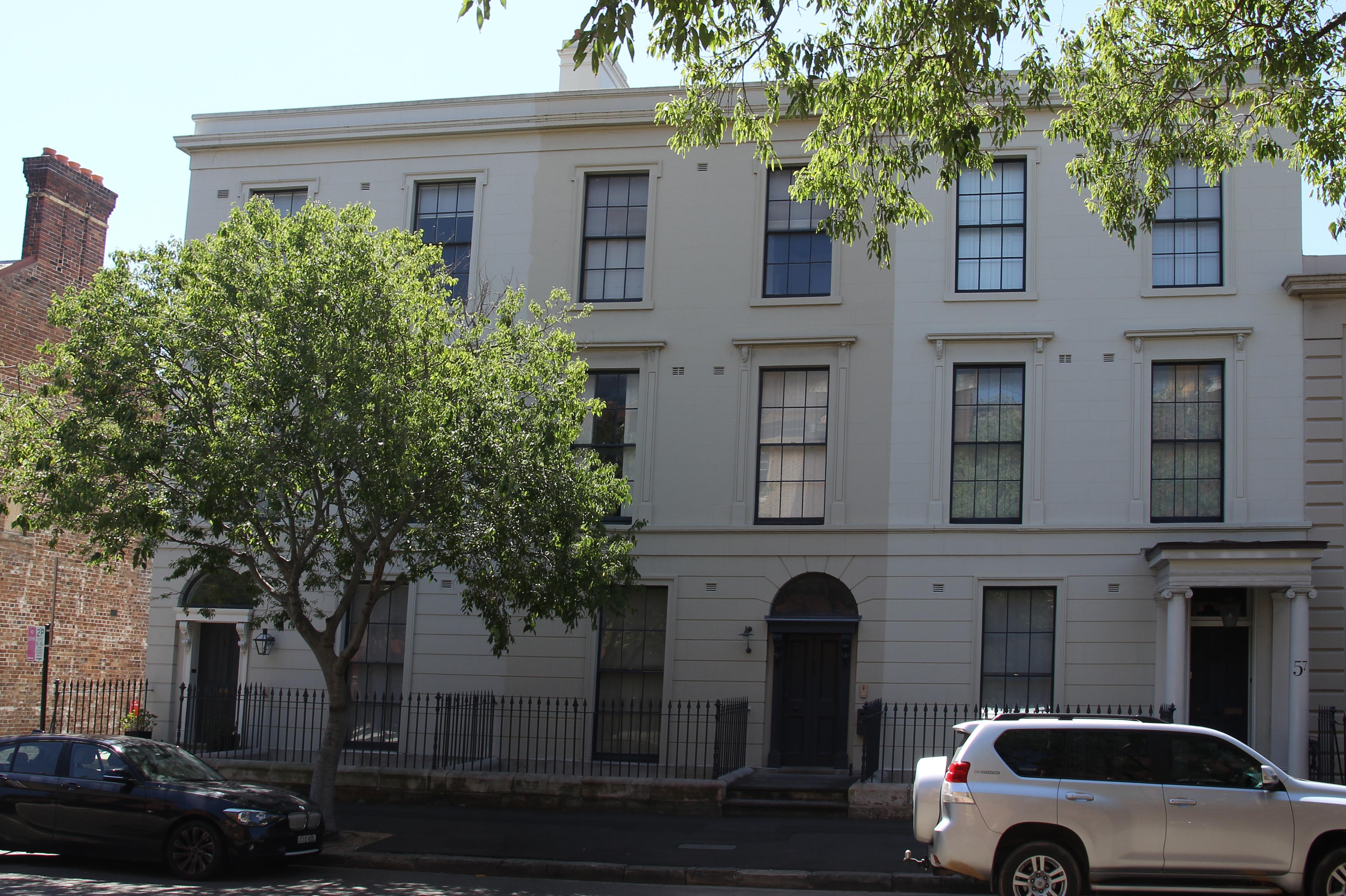
Three-storey Victorian Regency terrace in Millers Point (c. 1857).

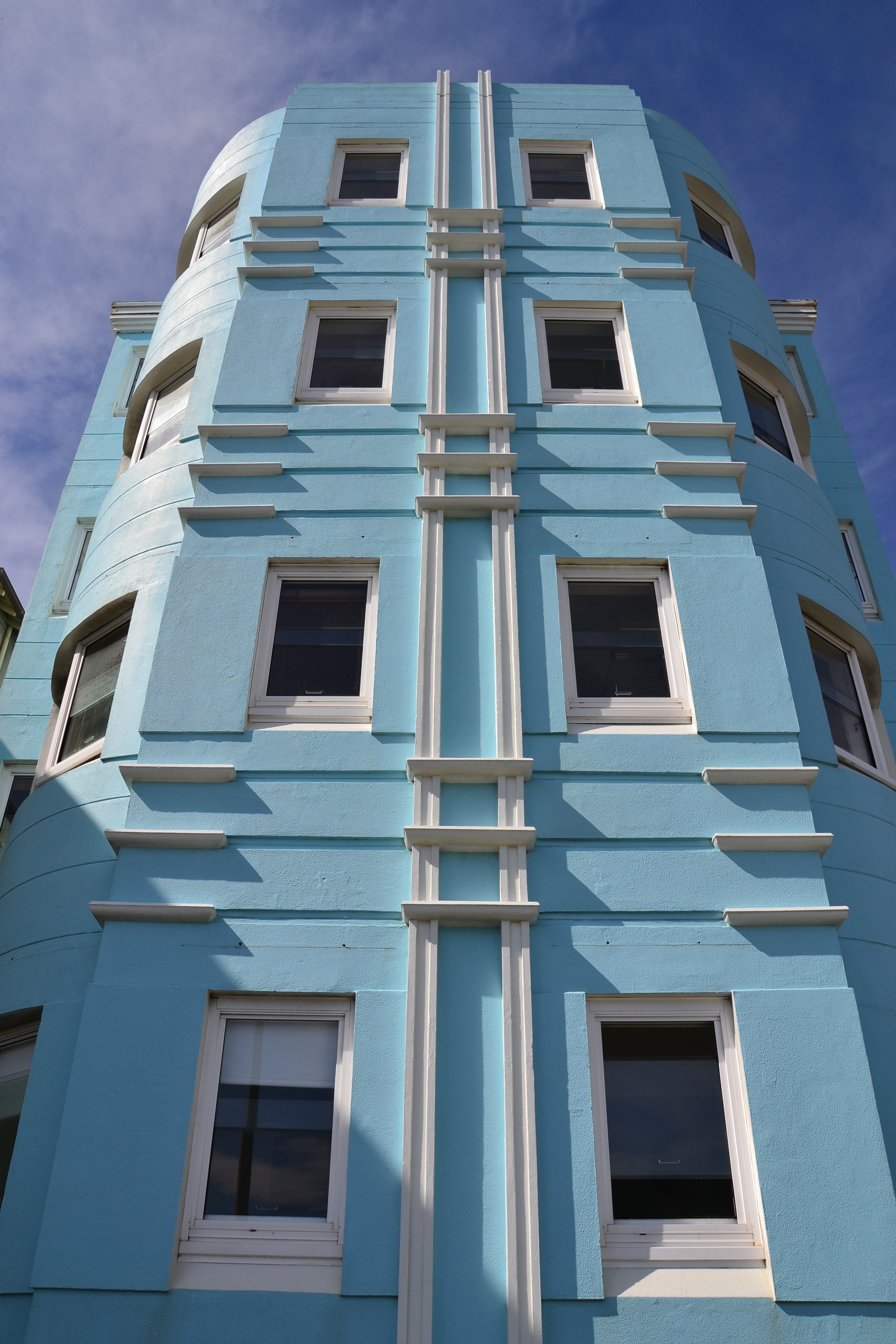
Art deco apartments in Bondi Beach

Of the more than sixty Australian residential architectural styles that developed in Sydney over the years, more than half were used in residential architecture. Prominent residential styles included:

=== Old Colonial Period ===
- Georgian
- Regency
- Grecian

=== Victorian Period ===
- Free Classical
- Filigree (featuring wrought iron balconies)
- Italianate
- Gothic
- Queenslander
- Tudor

=== Federation Period ===
- Free Classical
- Filigree (featuring woodwork instead of wrought iron)
- Queen Anne (the dominant residential style between 1890 and 1910)
- Bungalow (featuring prominent verandah)
- Arts and Crafts (including Shingle style)

=== Inter-War Period ===
- Georgian Revival
- Free Classical
- Mediterranean
- Spanish Mission
- Gothic
- Old English
- California Bungalow

=== Post-War Period ===
- International
- American Colonial

=== Late Twentieth Century Period ===
- Organic
- Sydney regional or Sydney School
- Tropical
- Late Modern
- Australian Nostalgic
- Immigrant Nostalgic
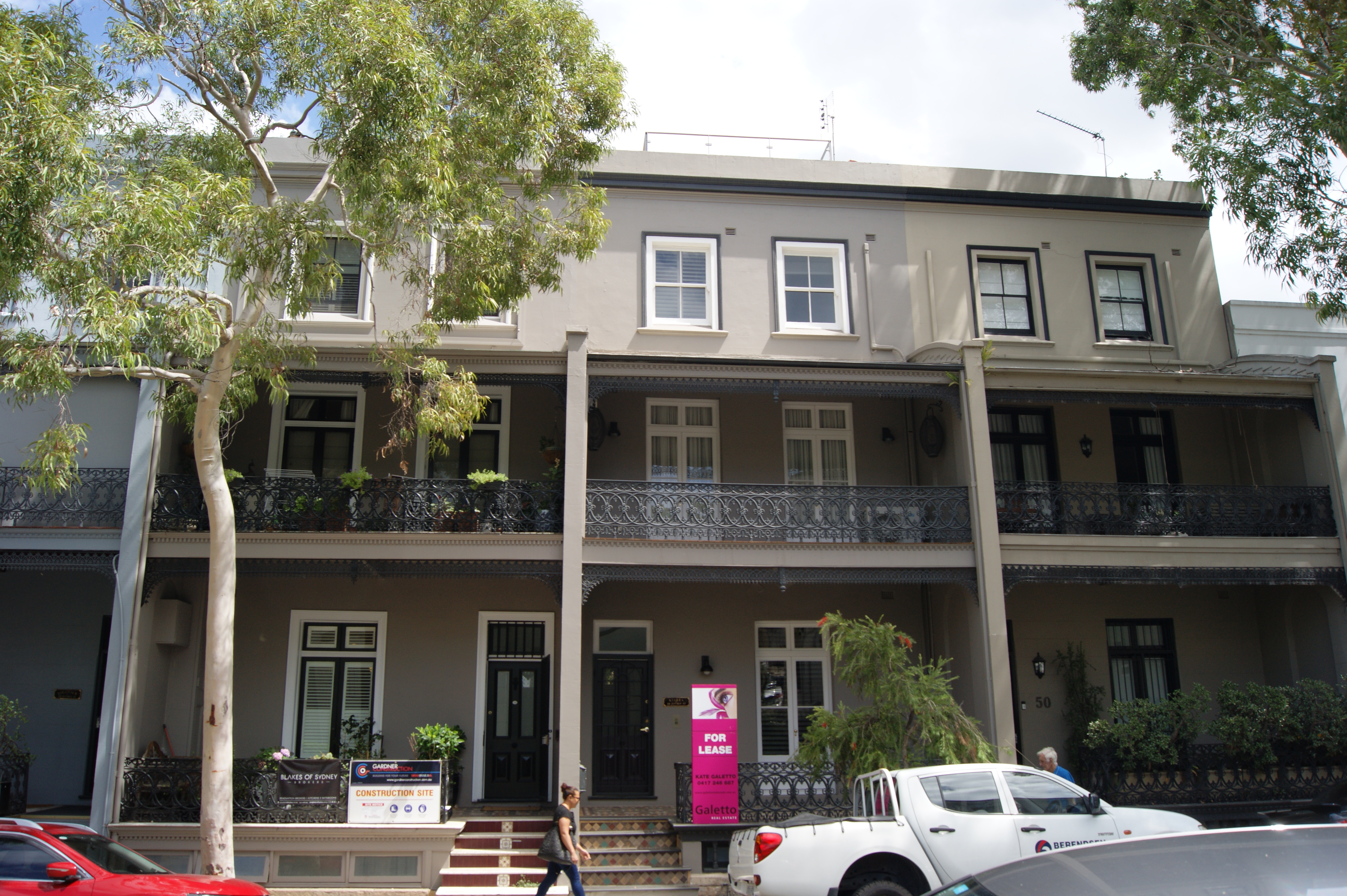
Many of Sydney's terraces have been subjected to gentrification, such as these in Kirribilli.

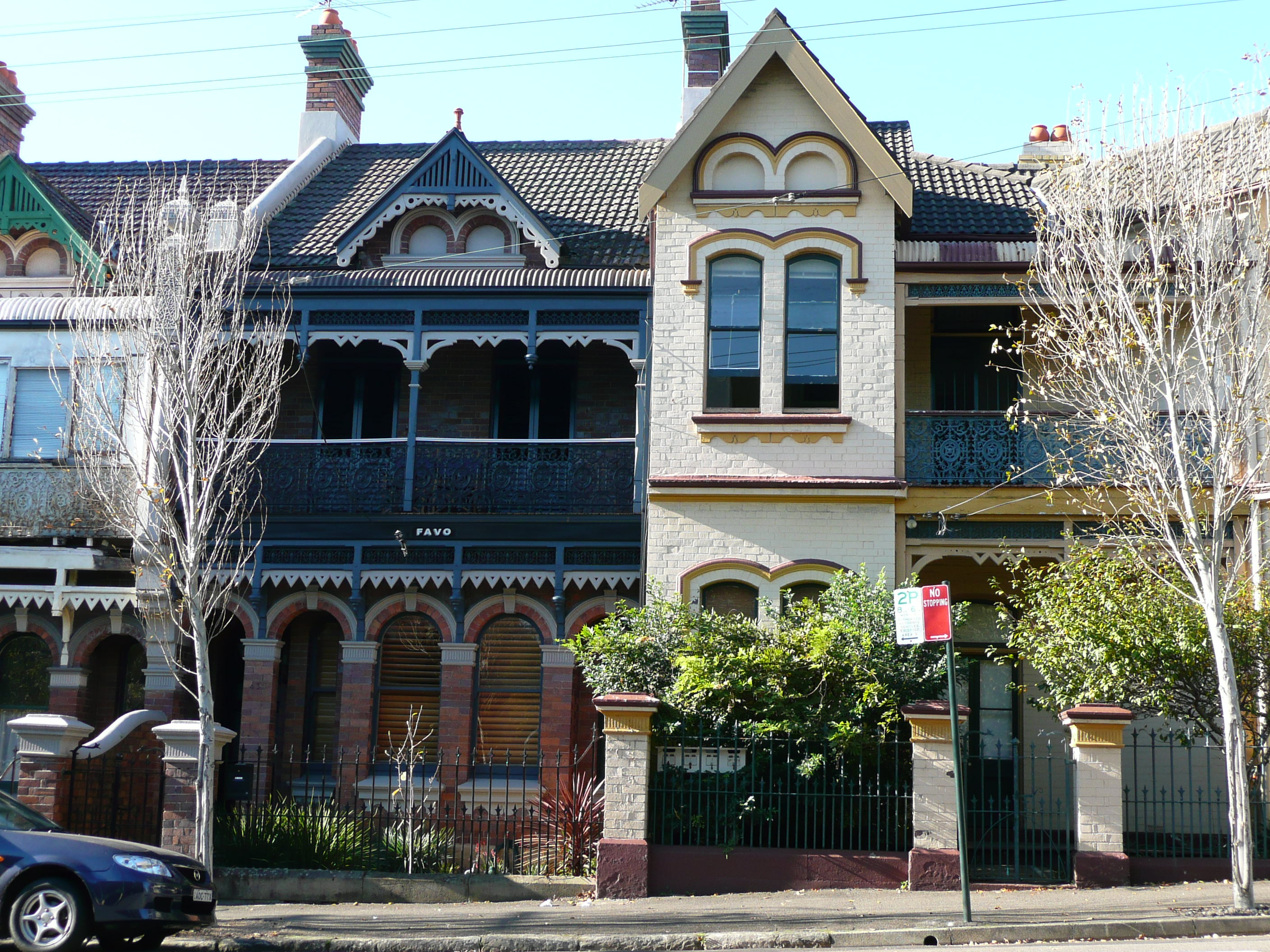
Terraces are common and widespread in older suburbs, such as these Filigree style terraces in Glebe

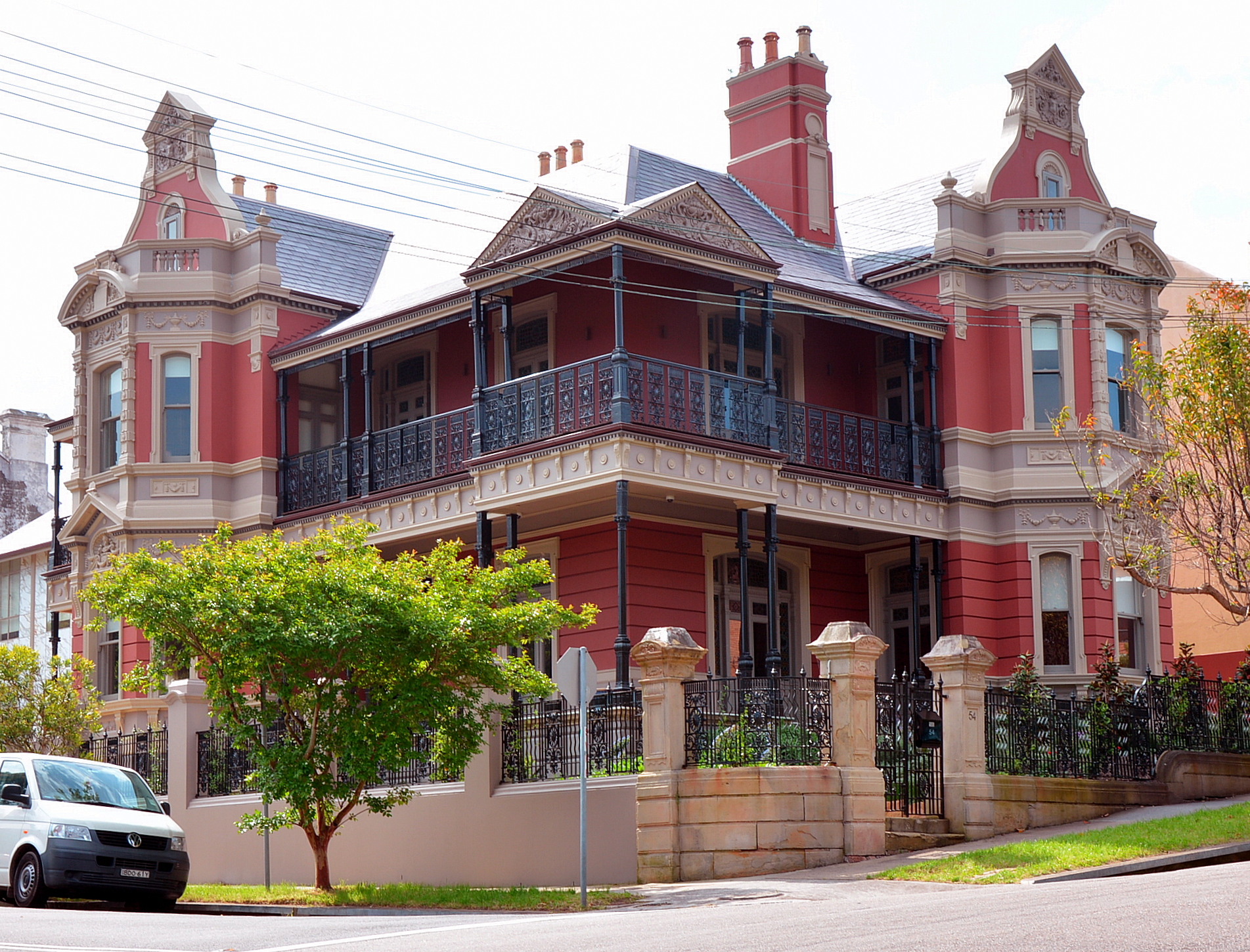
An Italianate home in Randwick, New South Wales

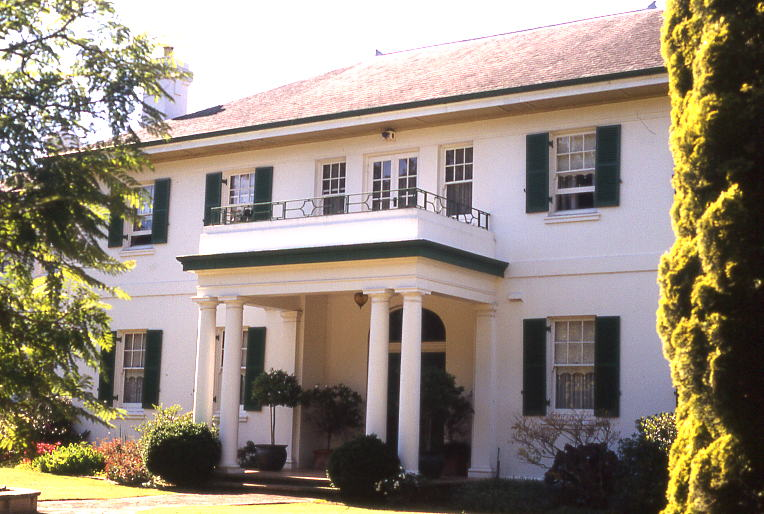
Merrivale, a home in the Regency style, Pymble

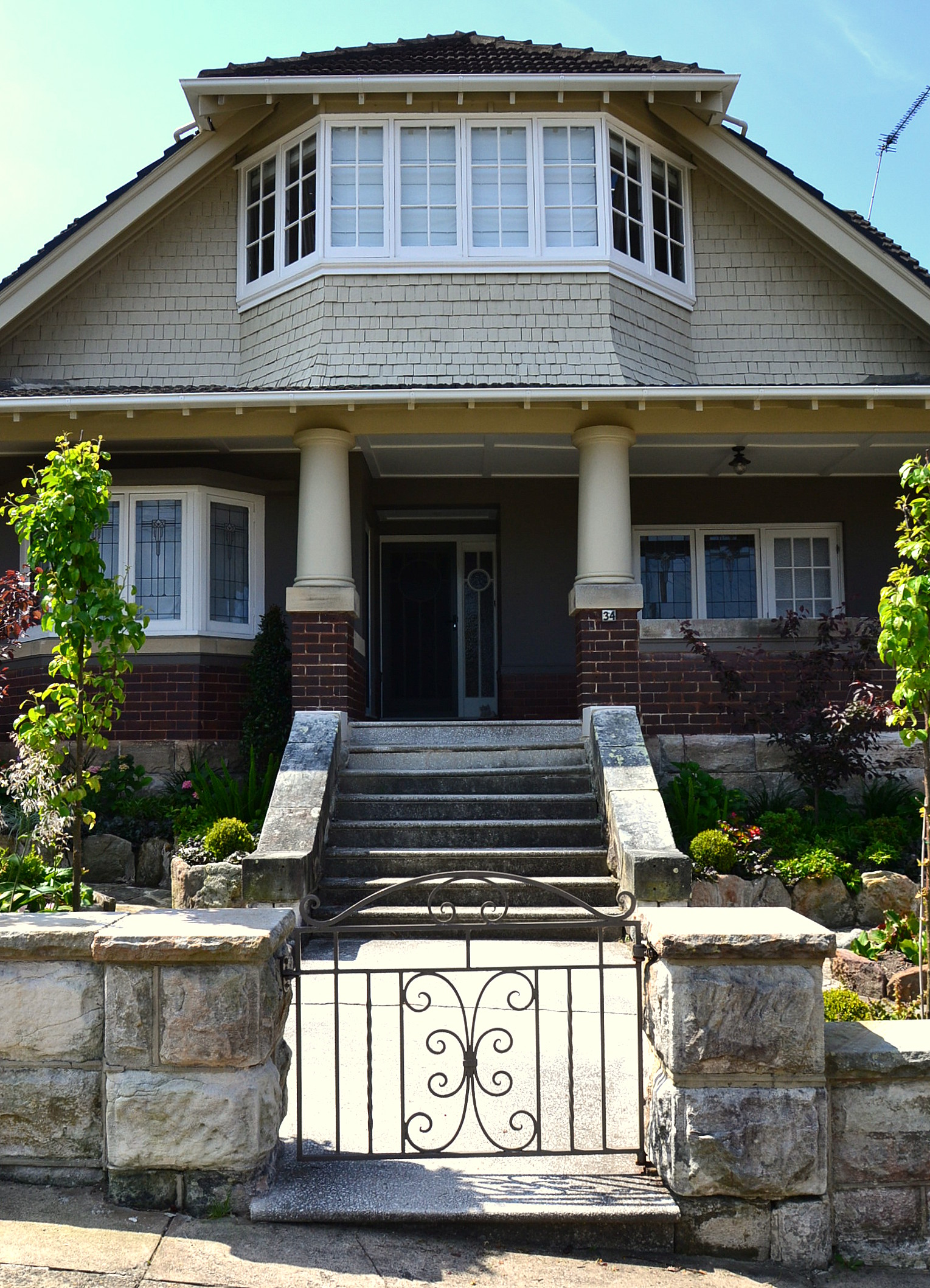
Two-storey Bungalow, Cremorne

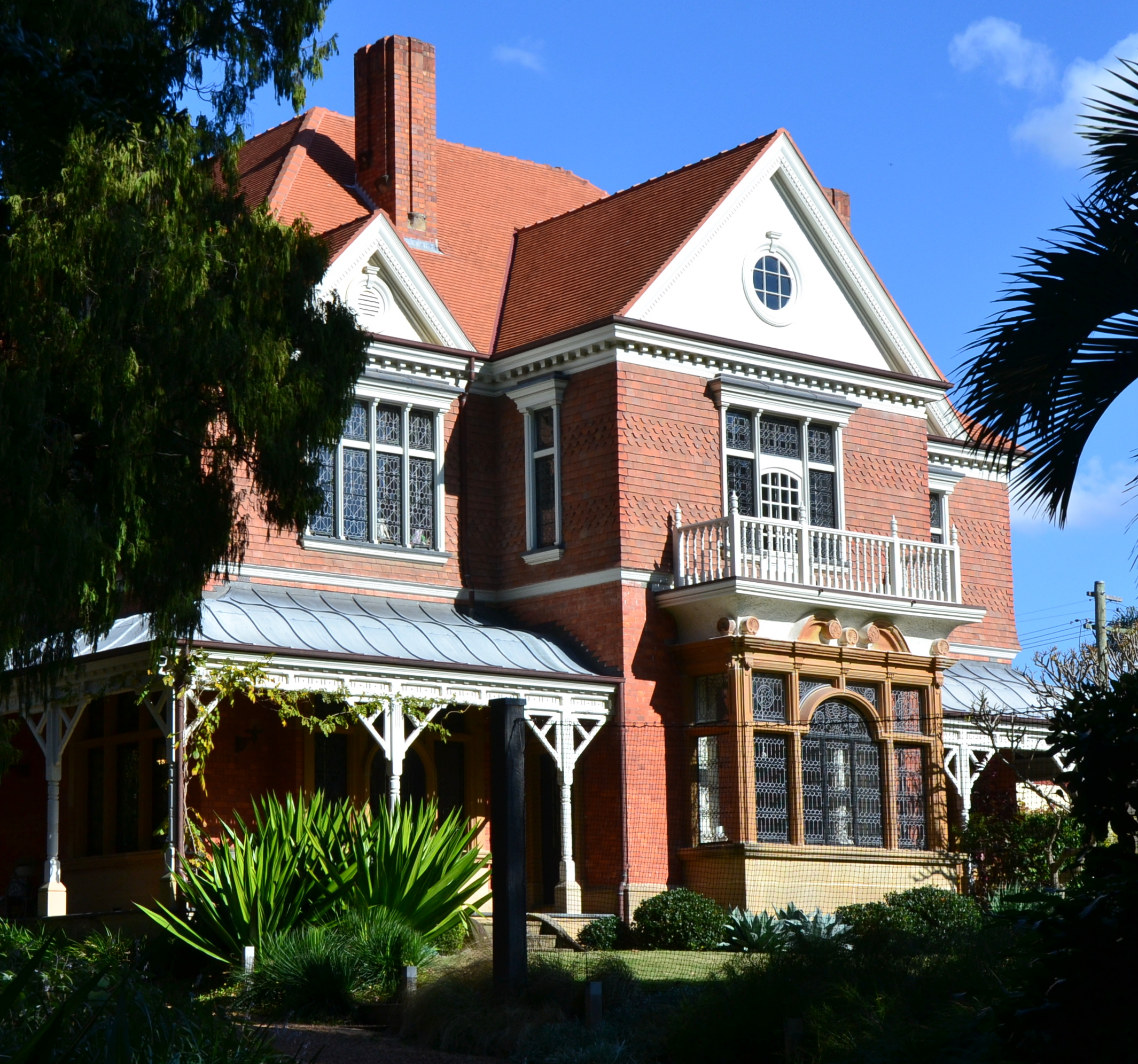
Caerleon, Bellevue Hill, New South Wales, the first Federation Queen Anne home in Australia

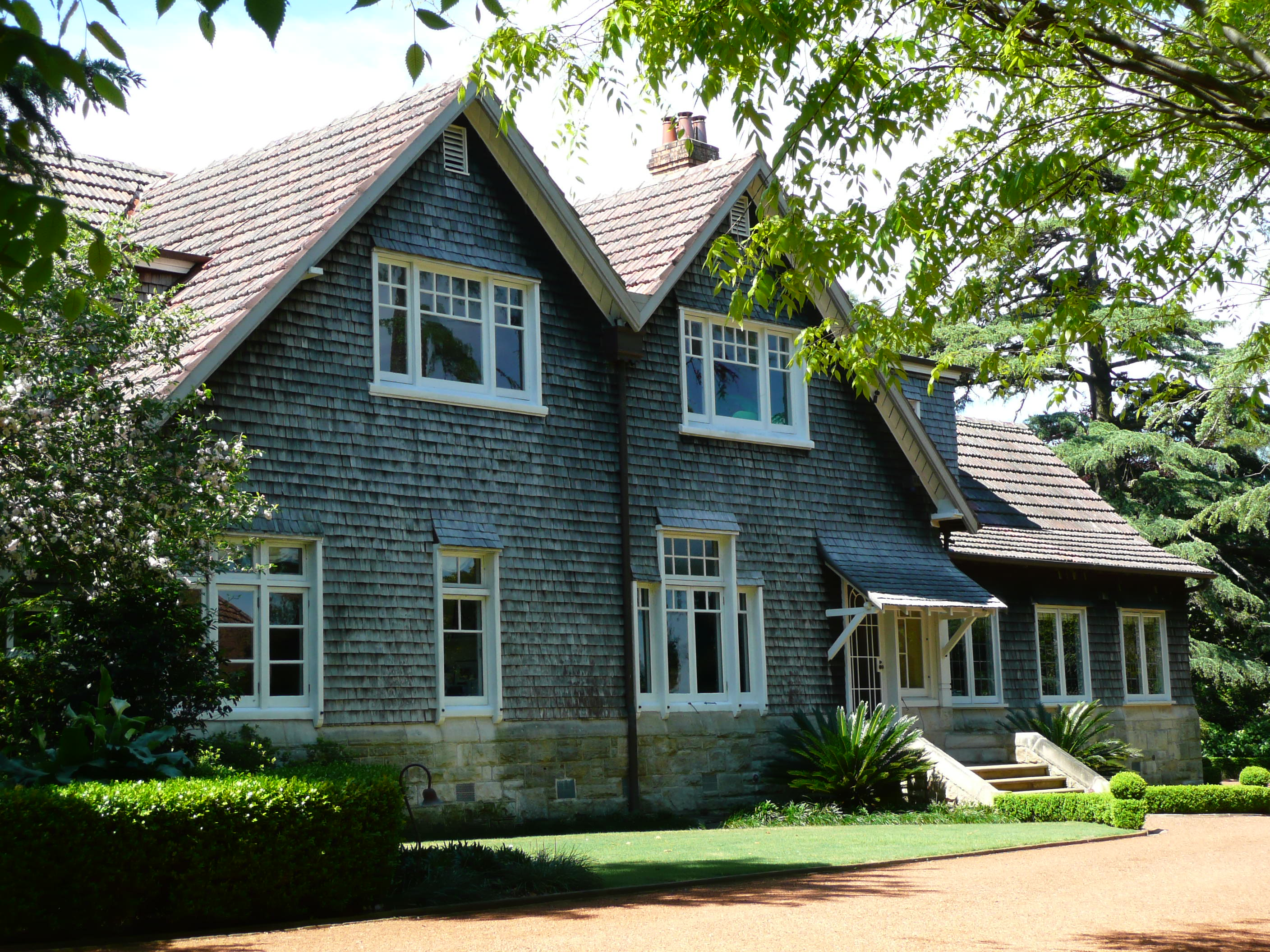
Pibrac, a home in the Shingle style, Warrawee (designed by John Horbury Hunt)

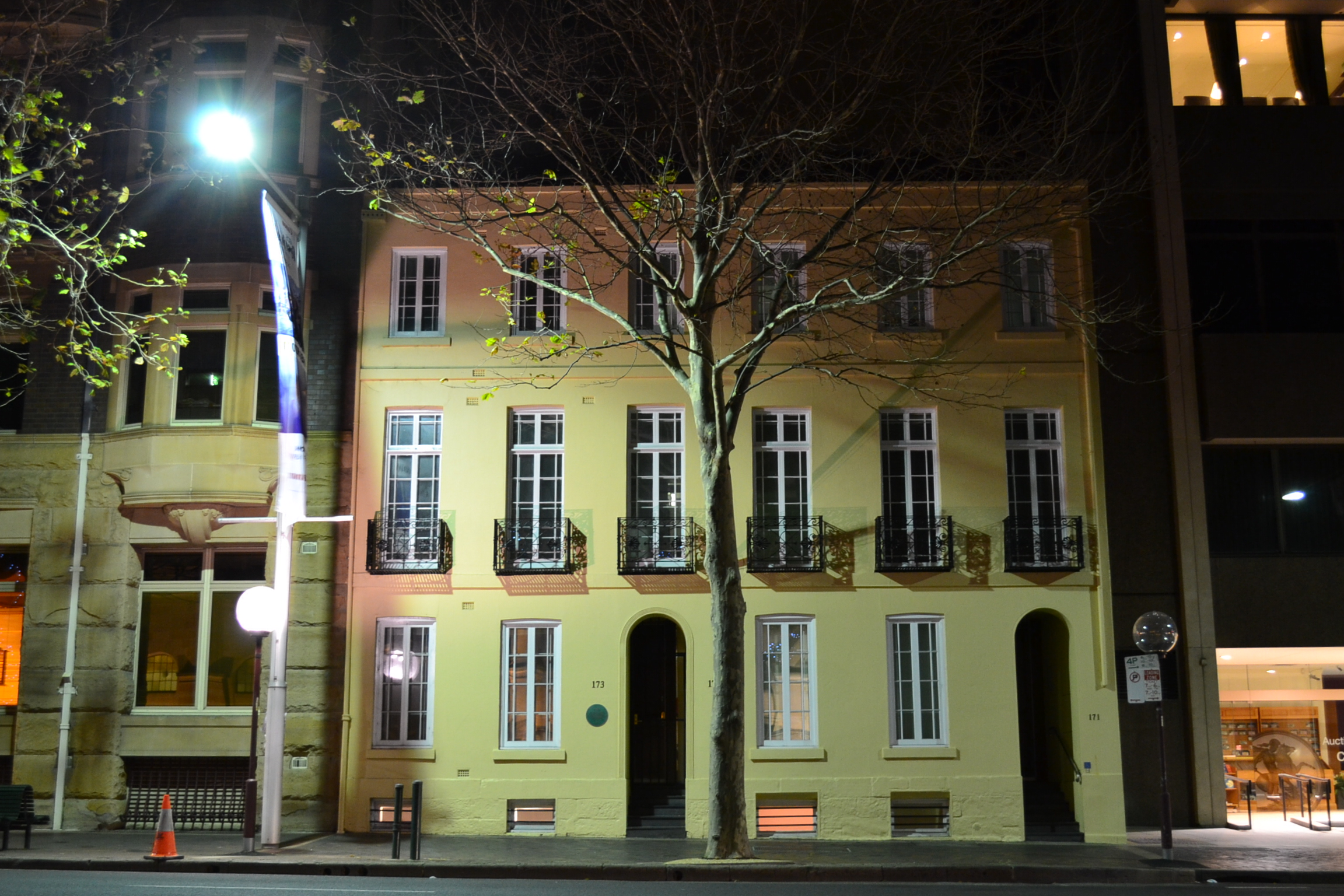
Horbury Terrace apartments in Georgian style, Macquarie Street

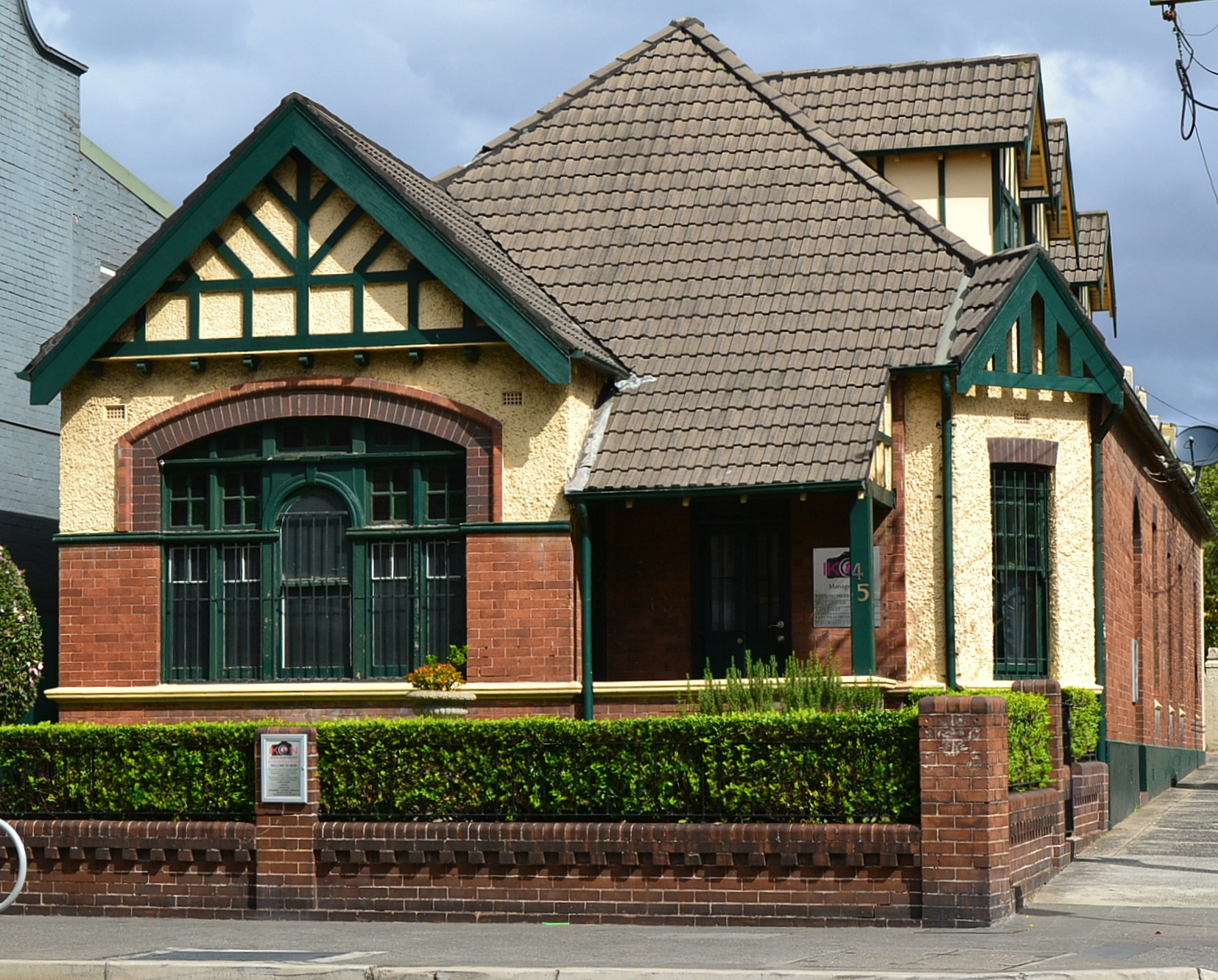
Cottage in Arts and Crafts style, Bondi Junction

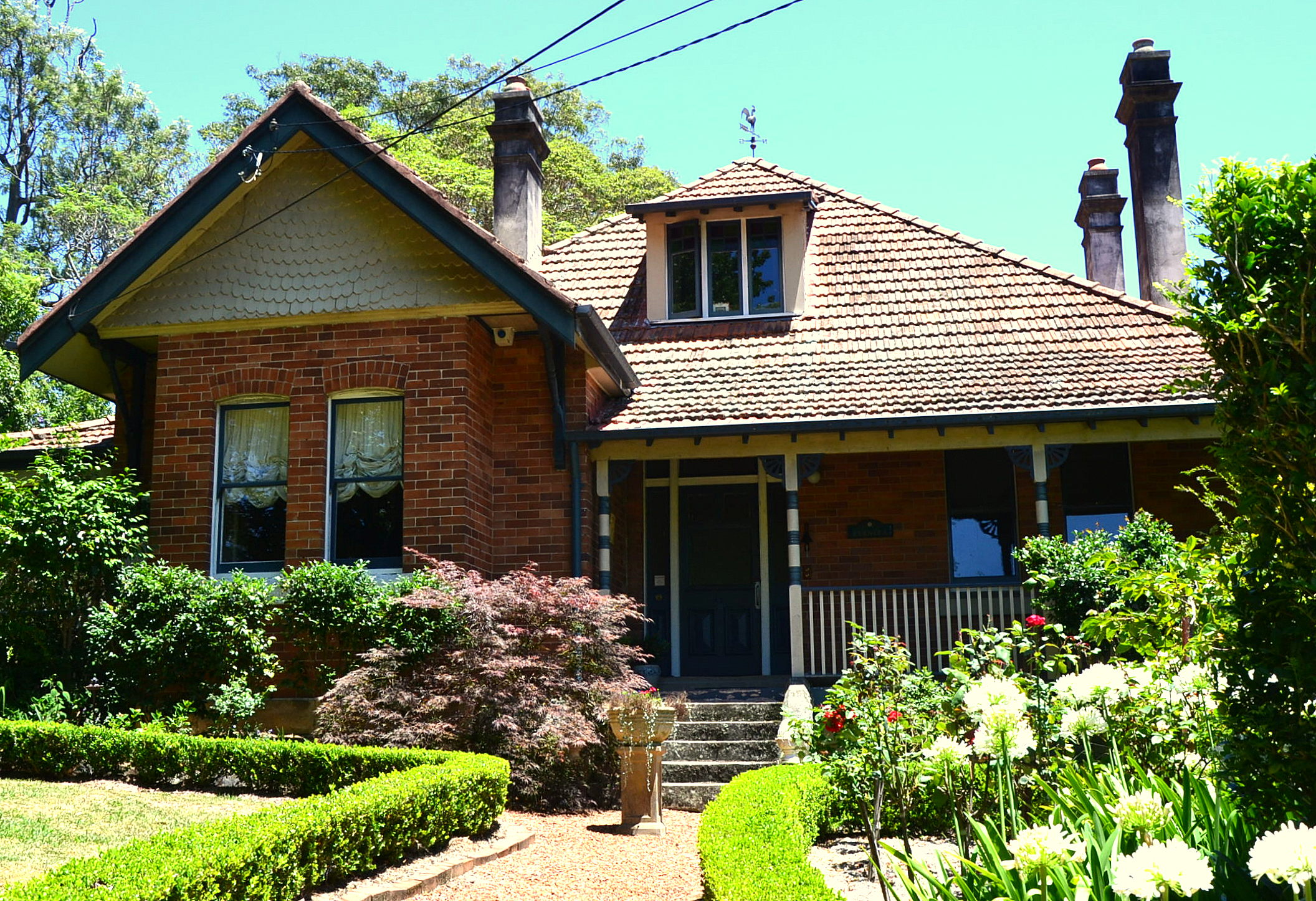
Fernlea, a Federation Bungalow, Wahroonga, New South Wales

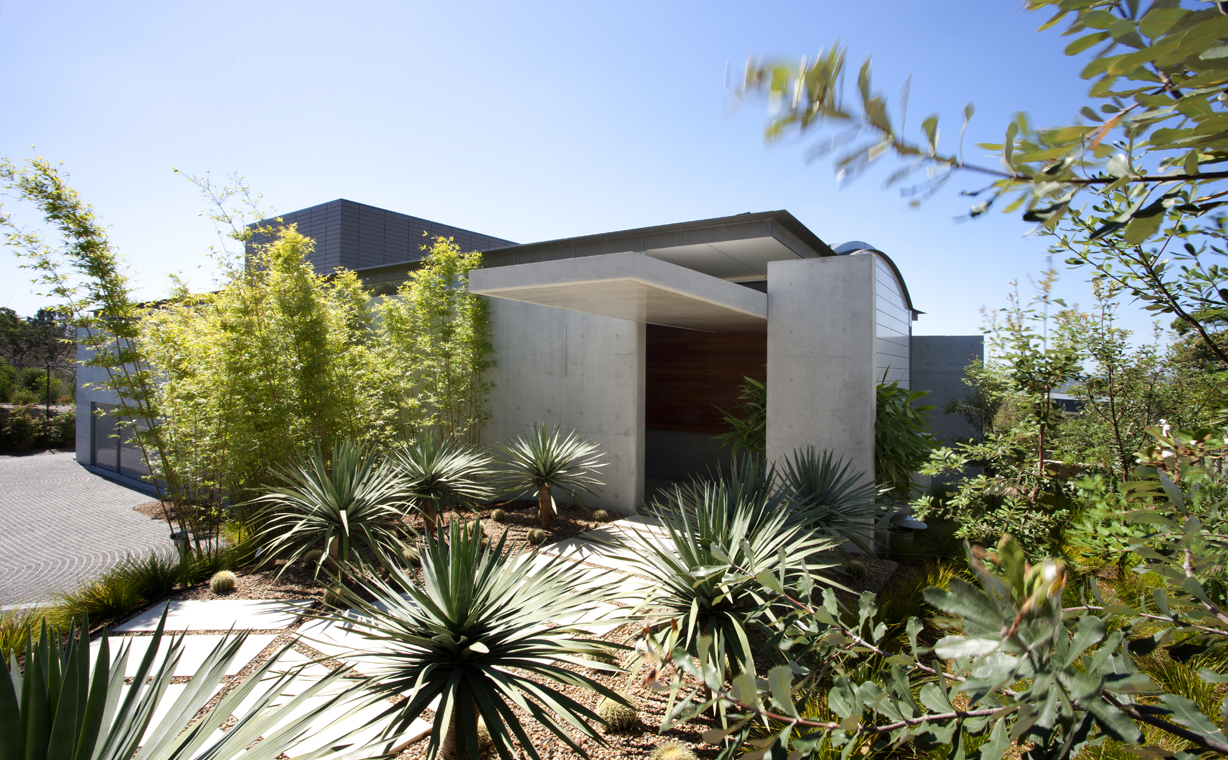
Contemporary home, Mosman

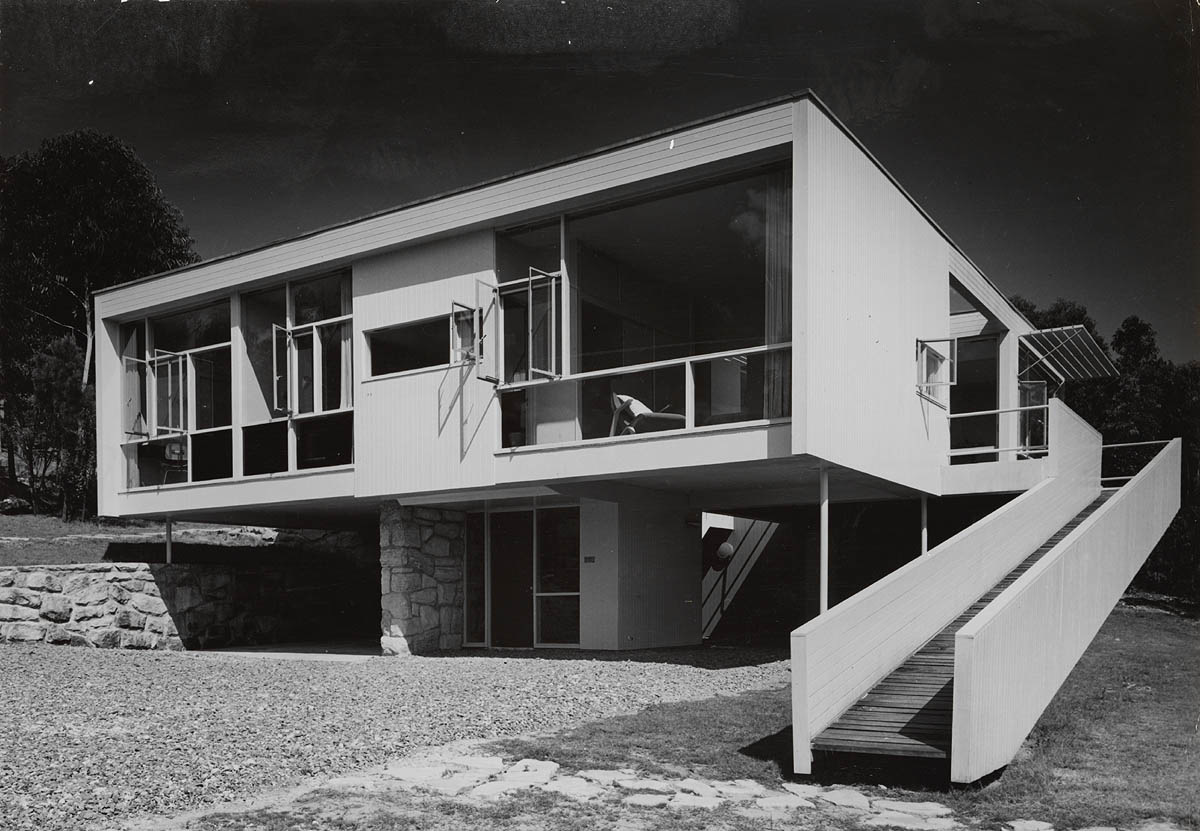
The Rose Seidler House in the city's North Shore was the first Modernist/Internationalist style building in Sydney. It is now open to the public as a museum.

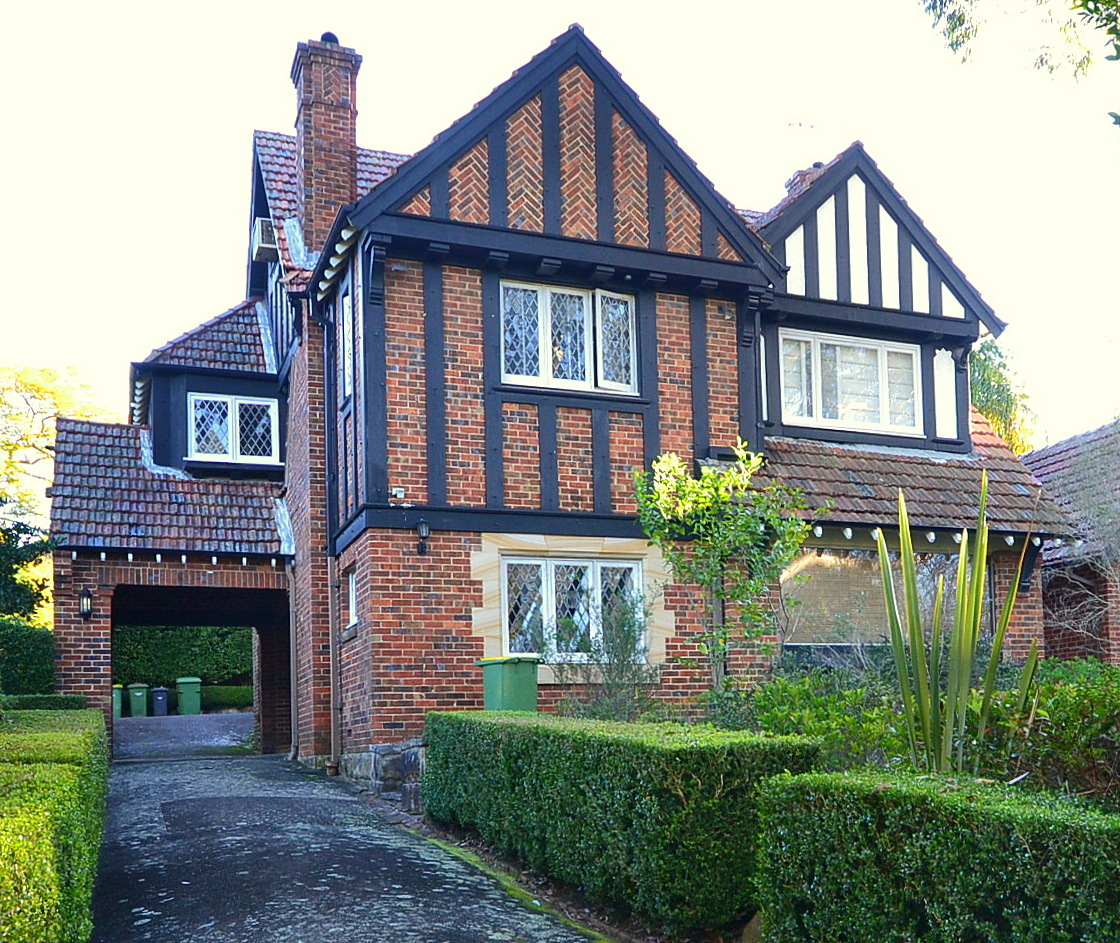
Old English house common within Killara

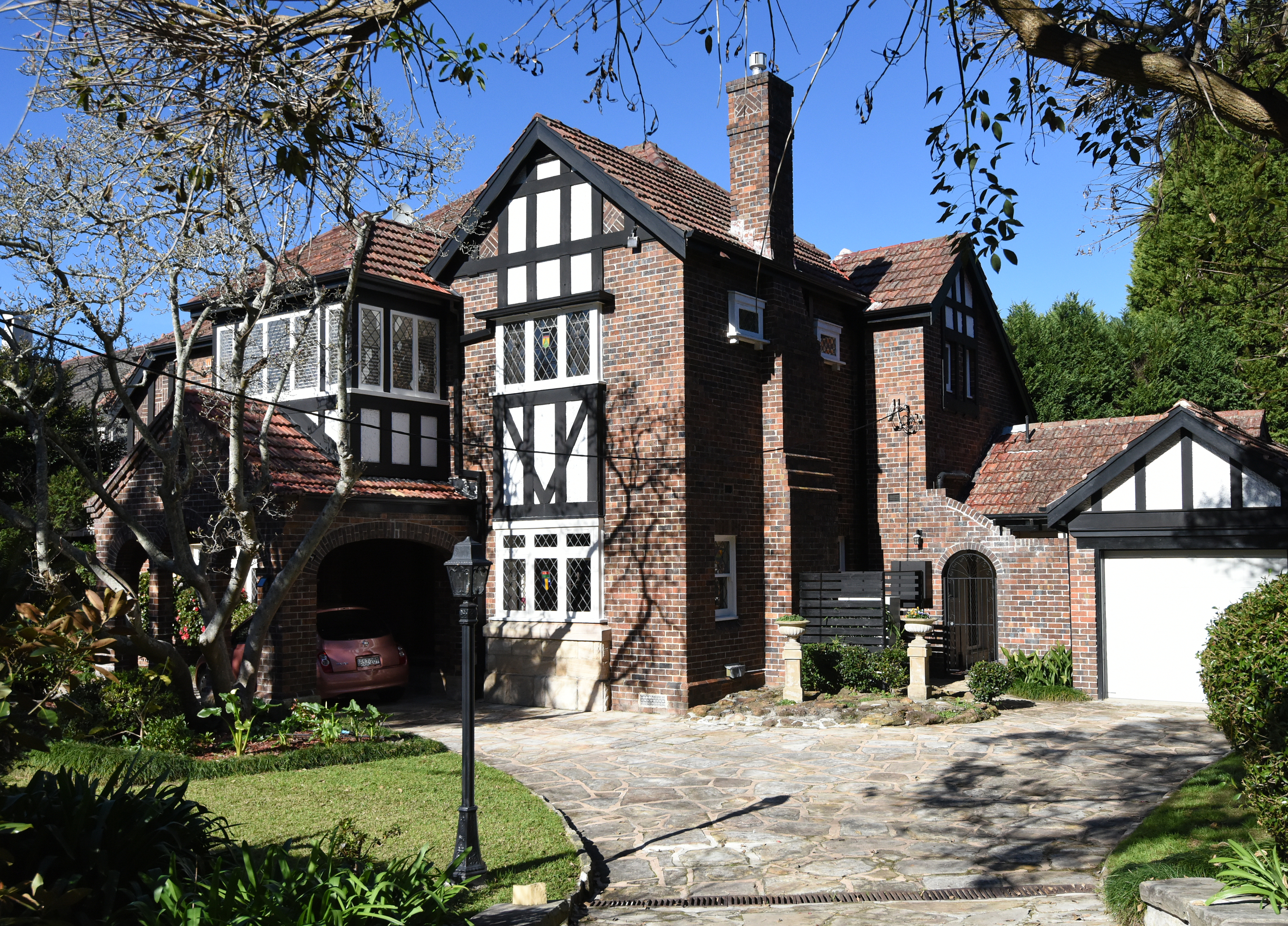
Tudor Revival house in Killara

== See also ==
- List of heritage houses in Sydney
- List of Art Deco buildings in Sydney
- Australian non-residential architectural styles
- Terraced houses in Australia
- Architecture of Melbourne
