= Neil Perry =

Australian chef (born 1957)

Neil Perry AM
- Born: Sydney, New South Wales, Australia
- Education: Newington College (1968–1973)
- Culinary career
- Cooking style: Modern Australian with Asian and European Influences
- Current restaurants
- Rockpool, Spice Temple, Rockpool Bar & Grill (Melbourne and Sydney), Rosetta (Melbourne and Sydney), Margaret (Sydney), Next Door (Sydney)
- Television shows
- Neil Perry Fresh & Fast, Food Source, Food Source: Asia, Food Source: New Zealand, Food Source: Far North Queensland, Rockpool Sessions, Fresh

Neil Arthur Perry AM is an Australian chef, restaurateur, author and television presenter. He also is the co-ordinator for Qantas Flight Catering under his company Rockpool Consulting.

== Early life and education ==
Perry was born in Sydney and attended Newington College and Drummoyne Boys High School. At Newington, a GPS school which stipulates a strict dress code, he wasn't allowed to have long hair. He used to grow his hair in the holidays and roll it up in combs when he went back to school. The school sergeant recognised what he was doing and sent him to the barber to have it cut off. In Year 10, Perry called his mother and said; "I'm leaving school." Following this, he began attending Drummoyne High, a public school, and did not cut his hair for two years, leading to his signature look of a ponytail. In February 2015 Perry was the guest of honour at the official opening of the Founders Hospitality Centre at Newington.

== Career ==
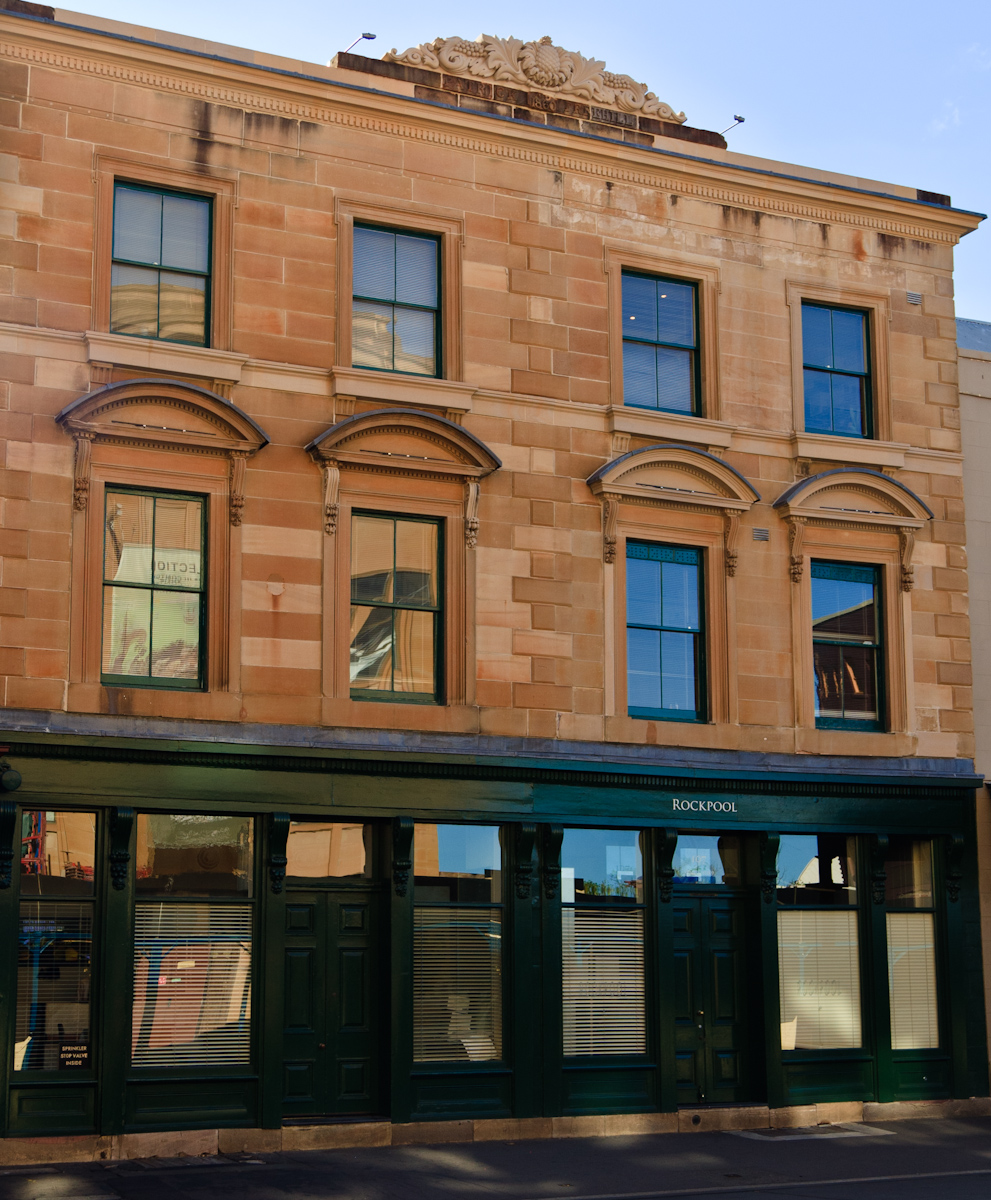
Perry's original Rockpool Restaurant at 107–109 George Street, The Rocks, Sydney

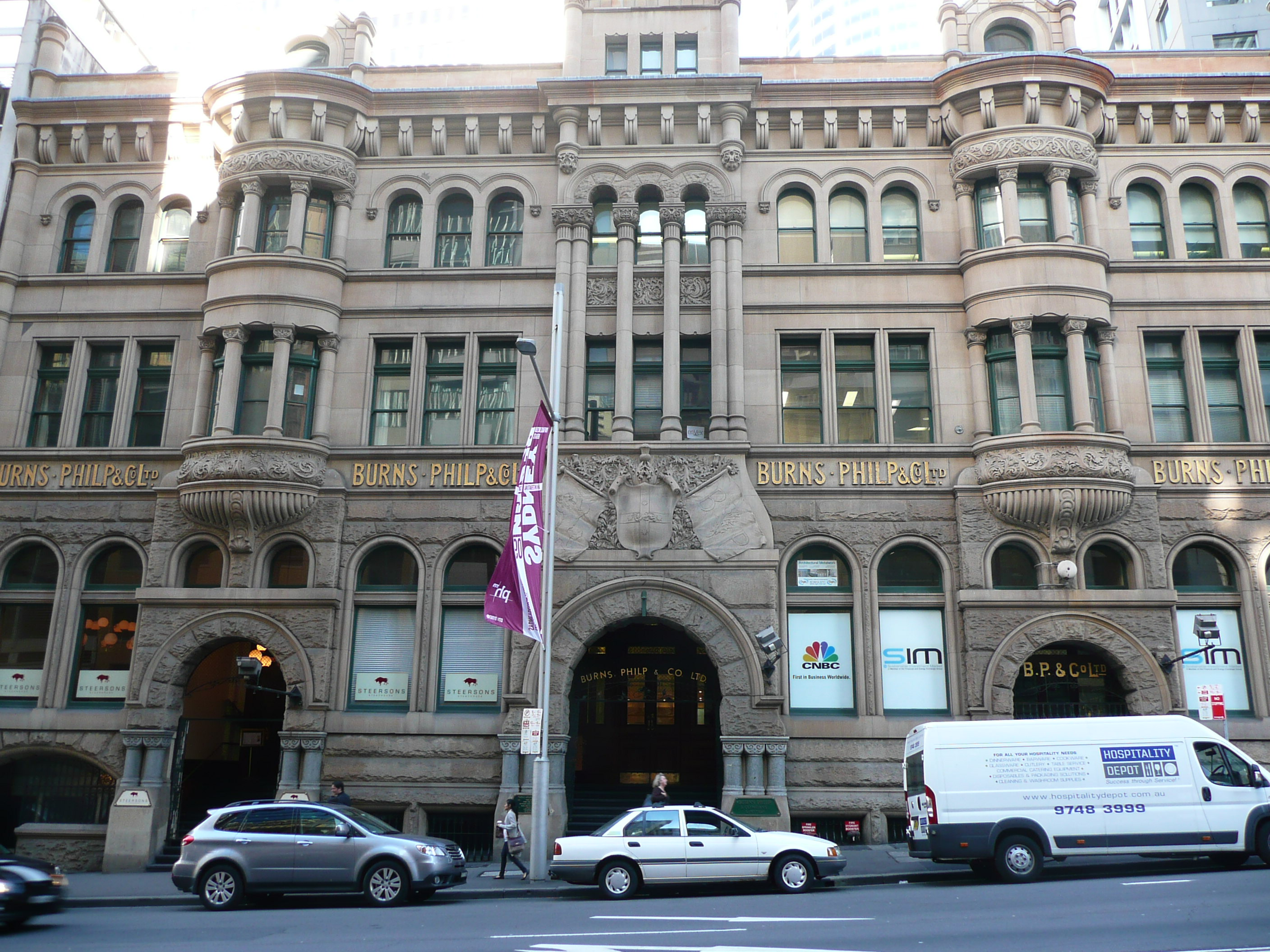
His later restaurant Rockpool Bar & Grill (no longer owned by Perry) in the Burns Philp Building in Bridge Street, Sydney

Prior to joining the hospitality industry Perry started an apprenticeship as a hairdresser before dropping out and working as a waiter. This is where he found his calling as a chef.

Perry's career in the hospitality industry began with working at Mishas Balmoral Beach where he left as a second year apprentice then managing Sails restaurants at the Sydney suburb of McMahons Point, and then at Rose Bay. This was where most of Perry's floor management skills were learnt. By the time he was 24 he found himself gravitating towards the kitchen, and realised his passion for cooking by working with, and learning from over the ensuing years, chefs such as Damien Pignolet, Gay Bilson, Stephanie Alexander, Steve Manfredi, Will Caffrey and David Thompson. Although he uses the title, Perry never actually completed a chef apprenticeship.

Perry became head chef at Barrenjoey Restaurant, Palm Beach and was given creative control over Perry's in Paddington. In October 1986, Perry opened the Blue Water Grill at Bondi Beach which became an overnight success. He then opened Rockpool in February 1989 with his business partner and cousin Trish Richards.

In 2007, Perry opened Rockpool Bar & Grill in Melbourne. Less formal than Rockpool, the restaurant is an upmarket steakhouse, located in Crown Casino. High quality beef cooked over wood-fire grill, supported by a modern and international à la carte menu form the backbone of the food served. In spite of the riskiness of opening a large restaurant (serving up to 200 people a day) in a venue as high profile and lucrative as Crown Casino, the restaurant has proved a major success. Rockpool Bar & Grill Melbourne has also received positive reviews from critics since opening, including being awarded two coveted "chefs hats" in the Melbourne Good Food Guide.

Meanwhile, this same year, having maintained Rockpool for almost two decades as a Sydney fine dining restaurant, Perry finally decided to close the restaurant and reopen with a change of direction as a "casual seafood venue" instead. Perry cited a lack of will to continue operating Rockpool at the demanding and highly competitive level he had been as the main reason for the change.

Though this new incarnation of Rockpool had only been open for a brief time, in mid-2008 Perry had a change of heart and suddenly announced that Rockpool would be returning to its original form as a fine-diner. As Perry put it: "Rockpool classic". The restaurant has since reopened, with an ethos and menu akin to its old form.

2009 saw the opening of two more restaurants in Sydney, both located in the same art deco building on Bligh Street in Sydney's CBD. First to open was Spice Temple in the basement level. Like the now-defunct XO Perry opened in Surry Hills some years ago, Spice Temple represents another foray by Perry into more traditional Asian cuisine—specifically regional Chinese food this time—given a sophisticated polish. Spice Temple was soon followed by the opening in the above level of a sibling instalment of Melbourne's successful Rockpool Bar & Grill. Since 2010, Rockpool Bar & Grill Sydney has been the recipient of the Wine Spectator Grand Award.

Since November 2013 Rockpool has been in the former Burns Philp Building in Bridge Street, Sydney. The historic building was completed in 1901 to the design of Arthur Anderson of A.L. & G. McCredie & Anderson.

Perry became director of food, beverage, and service for the Australian flagship airline Qantas in 1997 and has been responsible for the in-flight and ground based culinary offerings for over 25 years. Menus are developed quarterly for International First and Business Class travellers, with the Rockpool team overseeing the implementation and introduction to catering centres at key ports. In 2015 his role was expanded to include of wines and beverages. In 2022, to celebrate the 25-year collaboration with Perry, Qantas reintroduced a selection of his most popular inflight and lounge dishes.

In 2021 Perry opened another Sydney restaurant called Margaret, designed by Australian industrial designer David Caon and Acme & Co, followed in 2022 by a sister restaurant next door—aptly named Next Door.

In 2024 he open a new restaurant called Song Bird.

Perry was accused of significantly underpaying key staff as they work up to 70 hours a week in harsh conditions. The private-equity owned Rockpool Dining Group, which expects to make $40 million in profits this year, has also put significant pressure on vulnerable migrant workers, an investigation by The Age and The Sydney Morning Herald has found.

Perry is an Australian Apprenticeships Ambassador for the Australian Government.

== Television ==
Perry is also a notable food personality within Australia, appearing on Channel Nine's food program, Fresh and being a major presenter on channel the digital subscribers network, Foxtel, on the LifeStyle and LifeStyle Food channels in Australia and on BBC2 in Britain. He has also recently starred on Martha Stewart's shows. His series are promoted under the banners of:

=== Rockpool Sessions ===
Commenced in October 2004, the seven-part half-hour series profiles the restaurant Perry as chef. The series also features some of Australia's most renowned chefs. Along with Perry who is the host, Armando Percuoco, Guillaume Brahimi, Karen Martini, David Thompson, Steve Manfredi and Tetsuya Wakuda contribute to and provide information and opinions on the themes of each episode. He has also appeared on MasterChef Australia.

=== Food Source Neil Perry/Asia/New Zealand/Far North Queensland ===
Food Source is an insider's guide to food in Australia and features leading Australian chefs, food and wine producers and over 20 recipes. The series began in 2001, with series 4 (Food Source: Far North Queensland) being filmed in 2004. It continues to be shown on the LifeStyle channel, the LifeStyle Food channel and BBC2.

=== Fresh & Fast/Fresh & Fast Christmas Special ===
Neil Perry Fresh & Fast is a 13-part series

=== Neil Perry – High Steaks ===
The series premiered 21 May 2007 on The LifeStyle Channel. It shows the journey of Perry setting up a steakhouse venue in Melbourne. Perry deals with set-up costs of $4.5million.

The first episode shows before Perry opening up Rockpool Bar & Grill Melbourne, he was involved in expanding the Rockpool brand to London but had failed in a deal to establish a location in London. By the end of the series, he successfully opened Rockpool Melbourne and received good reviews for Rockpool Sydney and Melbourne. He was also looking to expand the brand into New York City or London.

== Charity work ==
Neil Perry is a board member of the Bestest Foundation for Kids. Bestest raises funds for children who fall outside the standard boundaries of the larger established charities and helps get these children support to battle an illness, obtain equipment for disabilities, gain access to education or provide urgent assistance to children at risk. 100% of all funds raised goes directly to children in need.

Perry is a principal supporter of the Bestest Gala Dinner and has managed to secure the support of chefs from around the world to donate time and resources for this charity dinner. In 2008 over 50 chefs from Australia's best restaurants participated with teams from Matt Moran (Aria), Guillaume Brahimi (Guillaume at Bennelong), Philip Johnson (E'cco), Shannon Bennett (Vue de Monde) and Scott Hallsworth (Nobu).

== Honours and awards ==
In the Australia Day Honours List of 2013, Perry was made a member of the Order of Australia in the General Division "for significant service to the community as a benefactor of and fundraiser for charities and as a chef and restaurateur."

Perry received the 2024 Woodford Reserve Icon Award.

== Books and media ==
- Rockpool (1997) ISBN 978-1-74257-048-8
- Simply Asian (2000) ISBN 0-670-88163-5
- Food Source (DVD, 2002)
- The Food I Love (2005) ISBN 1-74045-717-X
- Good Food (2007) ISBN 978-1-74045-923-5
- Balance and Harmony (2008) ISBN 978-1-74045-908-2
- Rockpool Bar & Grill (2010)
- Easy Weekends (2013)
- Simply Good Food (2013)
- Spice Temple (2015)
