= Chief secretary (British Empire) =

Position in British colonial governments

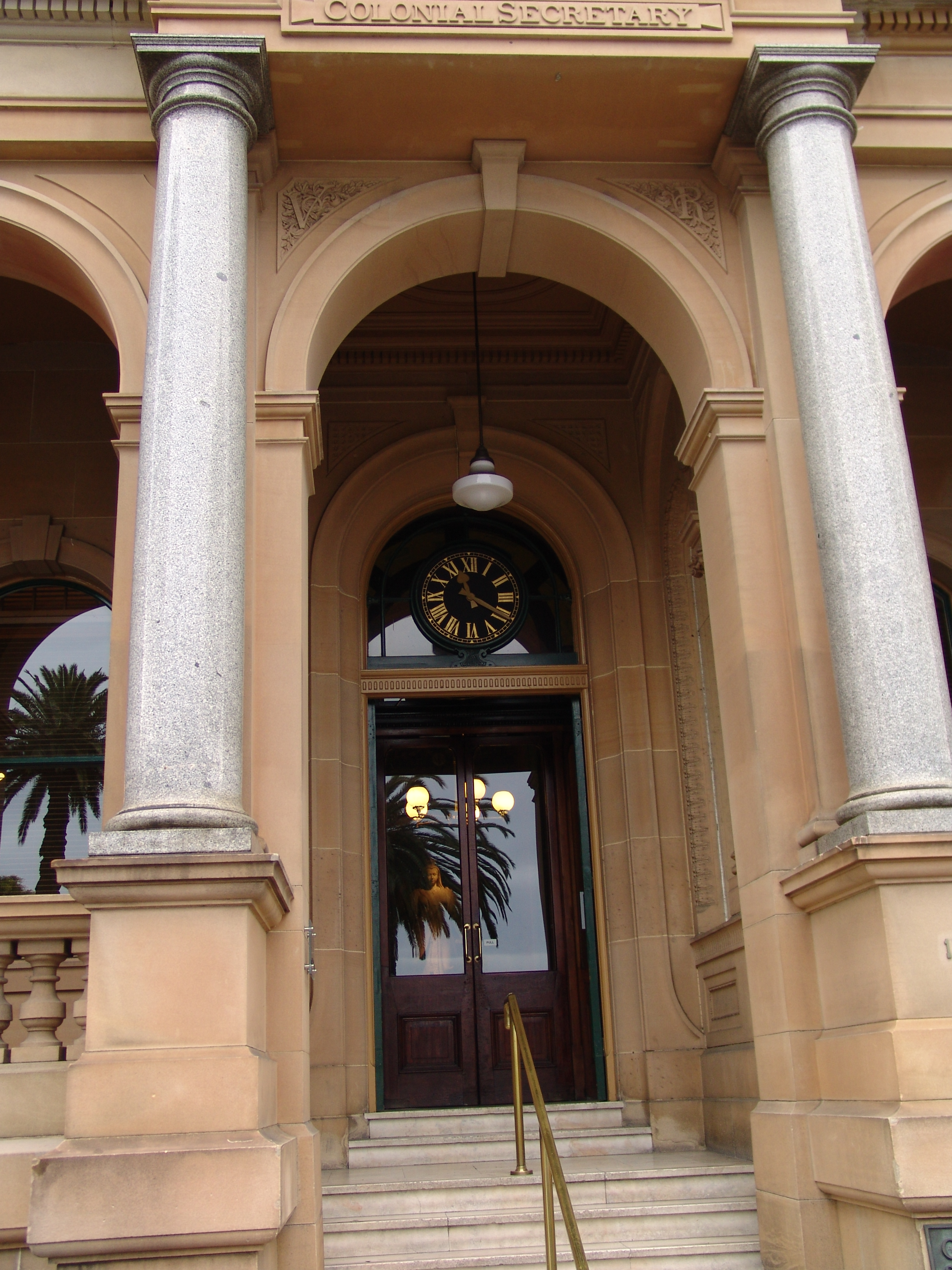
Entrance signed "Colonial Secretary" of the Chief Secretary's Building in Sydney (1873). A statue of Queen Victoria is barely visible through the door.

Chief secretary was the title of a senior civil servant in various colonies of the British Empire. Prior to the dissolution of the colonies, the chief secretary was the second most important official in a colony of the British Empire after the Governor, typically termed the colonial secretary and often an office held by the premier or a similar politically elected minister, and with a portfolio which was equivalent to what was later termed the Home Secretary's office.

== History ==
=== Origins ===
This office was at first known as "colonial secretary" or "principal secretary." In all colonies in British North America (with the exception of Prince Edward Island and Bermuda), the equivalent title was "provincial secretary". In Prince Edward Island and Bermuda, the term "colonial secretary" was used.

Originally the occupant of this post was secretary to the governor as well as secretary of the colony. In 1821, Governor of New South Wales Philip Gidley King wrote that the colonial secretary:

"Has the custody of all official papers and records belonging to the colony; transcribes the public despatches; charged with making out all grants, leases and other public Colonial instruments; also the care of numerous indents or lists sent with convicts of their terms of conviction, and every other official transaction relating to the Colony and Government; and is a situation of much responsibility and confidence."

In Ireland, the role of chief secretary dated from 1660.

=== Eighteenth and nineteenth century ===
The colonial secretary in the Colony of New South Wales and most of the other Australian colonies during the nineteenth century was a political position and not the position of a civil servant. The colonial secretary was thus a government minister and politician, and the position was fundamentally equivalent to the later term home secretary, and it was commonly (but not always) held by the colonial prime minister, later referred to as premier. The function of colonial secretary and secretary to the governor were thus separated in 1824, and several Australian colonies renamed their 'colonial secretary' as 'home secretary' during the 1890s and just before separation.

After the grant of responsible government, this office like its British equivalent, the First Lord of the Treasury was frequently the formal position held by the colonial premier because the office of premier was not mentioned in any legislation. The Cape Colony was unusual in giving the colonial secretary at the Cape responsibility for defence. Several of the Australian states and territories retained the title for many decades, the chief secretary's departments ultimately evolving into the modern Premier's Departments in those states, although the chief secretary position itself became separate from that of the Premier, and evolved differently in different jurisdictions: in some places it became the equivalent of the British Home Secretary or a Minister of the Interior elsewhere. New Zealand abolished the office in 1907.

Territories with chief secretaries included Nigeria, Kenya and Tanganyika. Smaller territories, like British Guiana, used the term colonial secretary instead.

== See also ==
- Provincial Secretary
- Secretary of State for the Colonies
- Chief Secretary’s Building in Sydney
- Secretary of State for Canada
- Chief Secretary for Administration
