= Arthur Anderson (architect) =

Australian architect

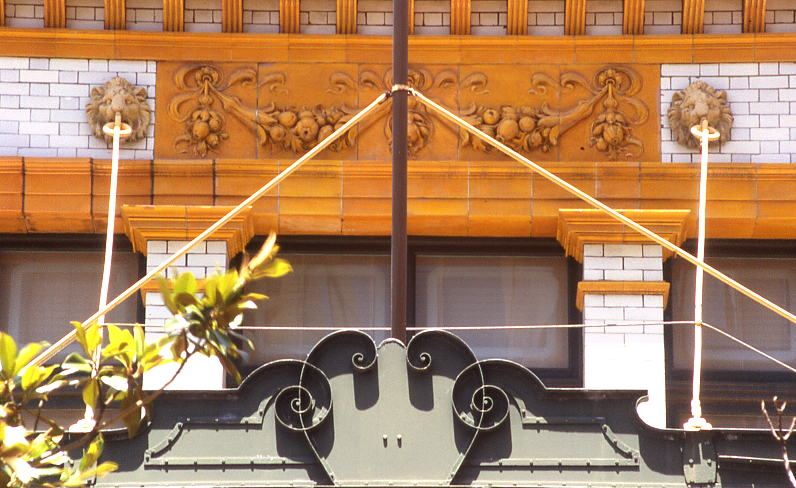
- Downing Centre, Sydney
- Born: Arthur William Anderson; 13 May 1868; Hobart, Tasmania
- Died: 25 June 1942 (aged 74); Roseville, New South Wales
- Occupation: Architect
- Practice: A L and G McCredie Architects (1884-1903); A L McCredie and Anderson (1903-24); Arthur William Anderson (1924-42)
- Buildings: Mark Foy's Piazza for Mark Foy's; Bon Marche for Marcus Clark; Head office for Burns Philp

Arthur William Anderson (13 May 1868 – 25 June 1942) was an Australian architect active in the last decade of the 19th century and the first 40 years of the 20th century. He was a founder and first president of the Federal Council of the Australian Institute of Architects.

== Early life ==
Anderson was born in Hobart, Tasmania, the son of Maria (née Lipscombe) and William Appleby Anderson and spent his early years in New Zealand. He was educated at Toorak College, Melbourne, and at 12 years of age he commenced senior education at Newington College (1881–1883). His three years at Newington coincided with the headmastership of Joseph Coates. In 1884 Anderson was articled in architecture to A L and G McCredie architects and consulting engineers and in the ensuing five years studied at Sydney Technical College.

== Career ==
=== Methodist Church ===
Throughout the 50 years that Anderson worked as an architect in New South Wales, two institutions had a strong influence on his commissions - his church and his school. Anderson was an active Methodist churchman and he did a lot of work for the church. As an Old Newingtonian, Anderson served on the Council of the College, as an honorary architect. he designed churches and halls in Rozelle, Arncliffe, Greenwich, Killara, Wahroonga and Grafton and parsonages in Tighes Hill and Moree.

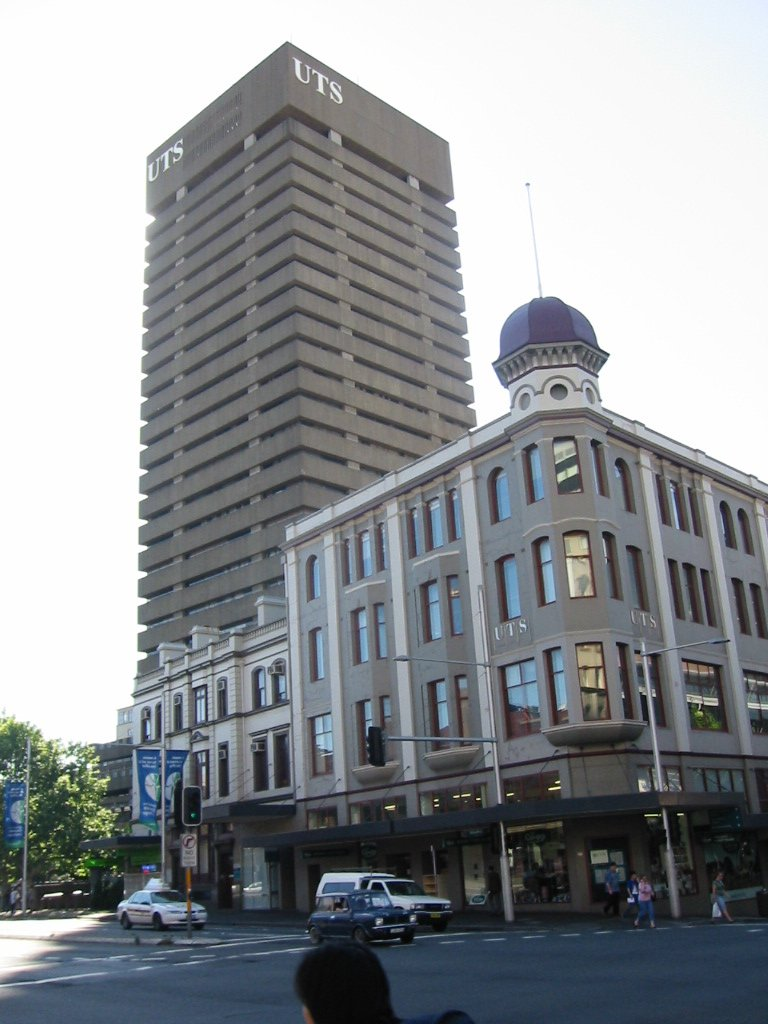
The Bon Marche store on Broadway, Sydney (UTS Tower in background)

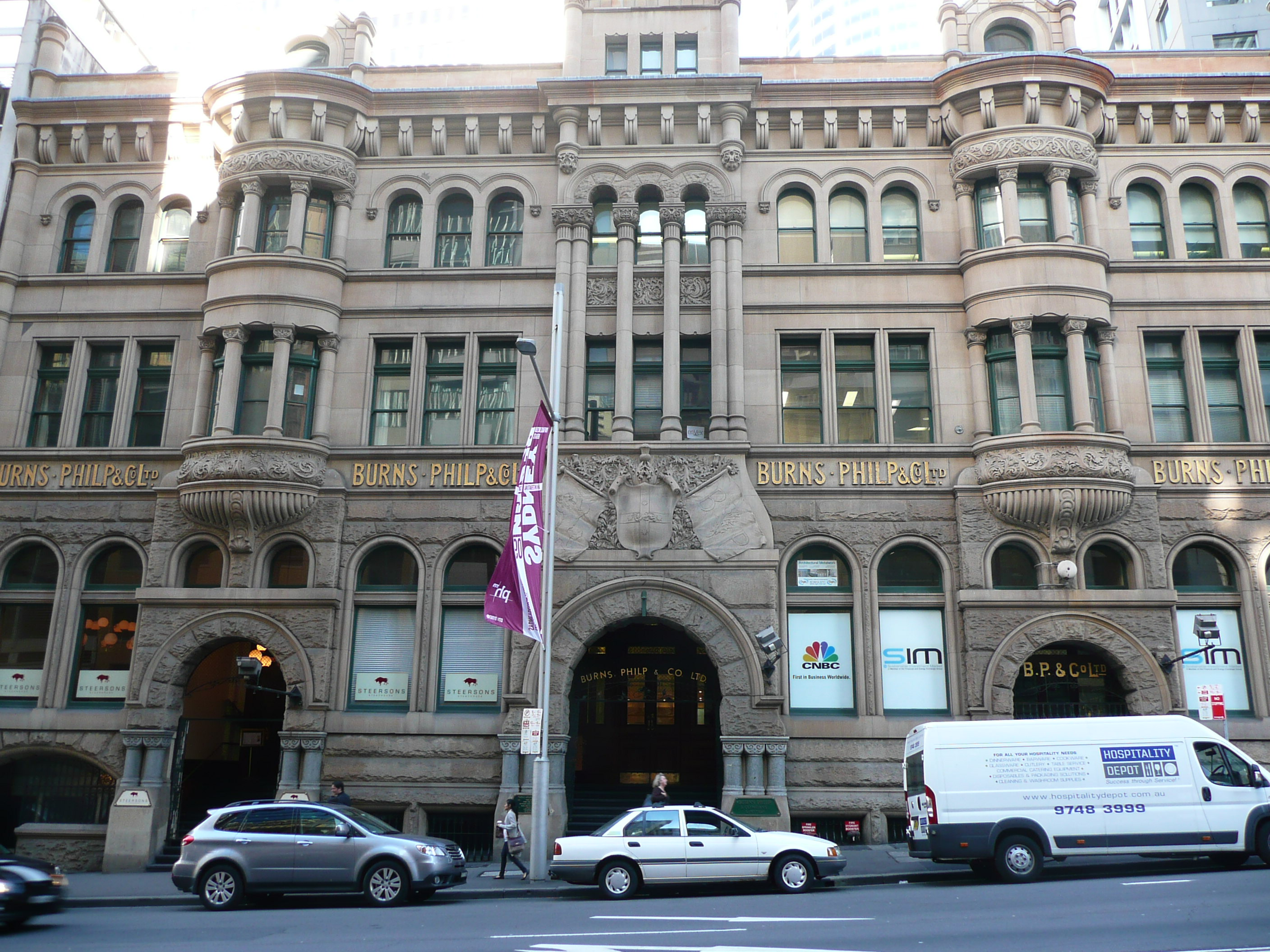
Burns Philp Building, Bridge Street, Sydney

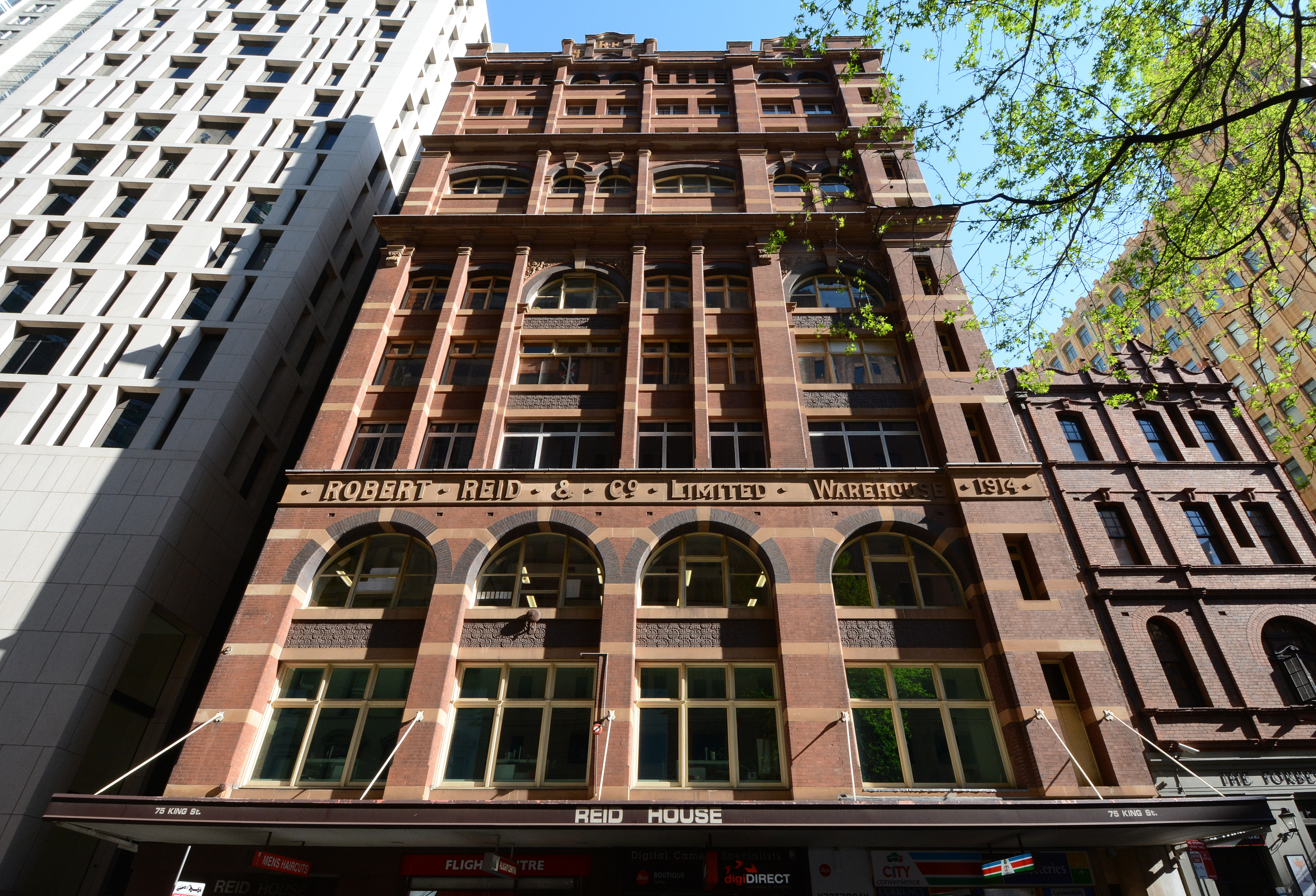
Reid House, King Street, Sydney

=== Sydney Harbour ===
Before the formation of the Sydney Harbour Trust, Anderson was responsible for the design of the majority of the wharfage premises, including wharves, stores and depots, on the eastern side of Darling Harbour. These included:

- Union Company
- Messrs. Huddart, Parker and Company
- Australian United Steamship Navigation Company
- Vacuum Oil Company
- British Australian Oil Company.

All of these buildings have now been demolished with the redevelopment of this area of Sydney Harbour.

=== Department stores ===
Anderson's designs for retail buildings included the Bon Marche store on Broadway for Marcus Clark & Company and the Mark Foy's store and numerous warehouses. For the Foy family he also designed residences in Waverley, Pymble and Narellan.

=== Offices and warehouses ===
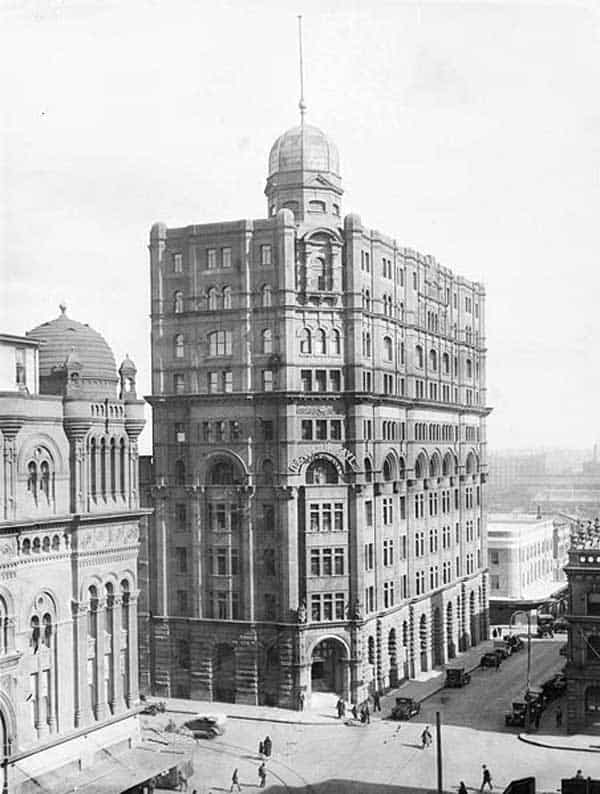
Henry Bull & Co. Building. Demolished in 1972.

Of the many offices and warehouses designed in Sydney by Anderson, three major examples survive:

- Burns Philp Building in Bridge Street
- Robert Reid & Company, in King Street
- Mungo Scott Flour Mill in Summer Hill

=== Community involvement ===
- President: Institute of Architects of NSW (1914—1916) and (1934—1936)
