= Bridge Street, Sydney =

Street in Sydney, Australia

Bridge Street, Sydney New South Wales
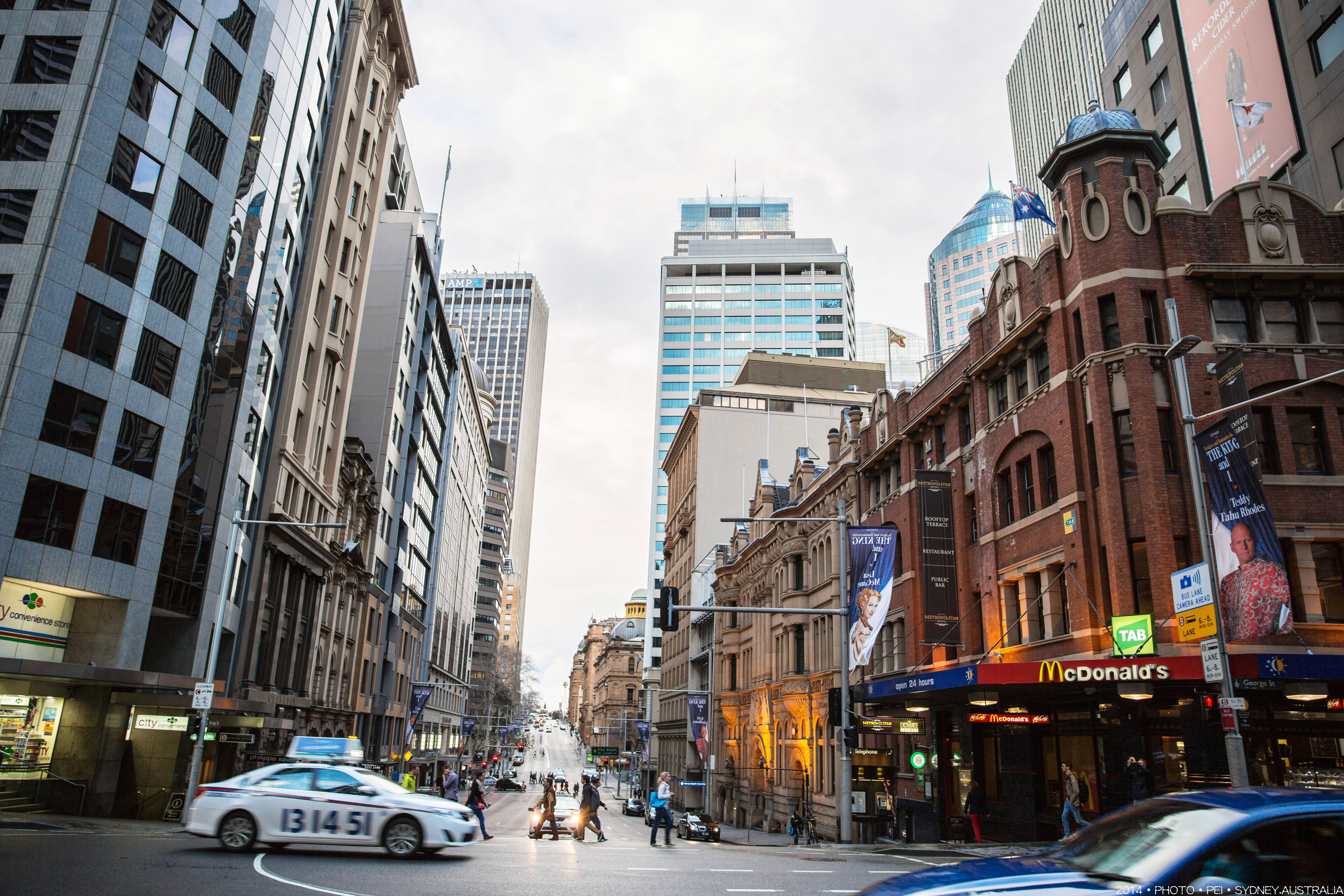
- Bridge Street looking east, in 2014

General information
- Type: Street
- Length: 500 m (0.3 mi)

Major junctions
- West end: George Street; Sydney CBD
- Pitt Street; Loftus Street; Phillip Street
- East end: Macquarie Street; Sydney CBD

Location(s)
- Suburb(s): Sydney

Bridge Street is a street in the central business district of Sydney, Australia. Bridge Street runs for 500 metres (1,600 ft) in a west–east direction with traffic flowing in both directions. It is situated in the northern portion of the central business district. The western terminus of Bridge Street is at George Street, with the eastern terminus at Macquarie Street, adjacent to the Chief Secretary's Building. From west to east, Bridge Street crosses Pitt and Phillip streets.

Bridge Street was named by Governor Macquarie in 1810, derived from a small bridge located near the intersection with Pitt Street. The bridge used to cross the Tank Stream in the early days of the colony, with the stream now flowing underground via a series of suburban tunnels.

The Bridge Street stop of the CBD and South East Light Rail is located south of the intersection of Bridge Street and George Street.

== History ==
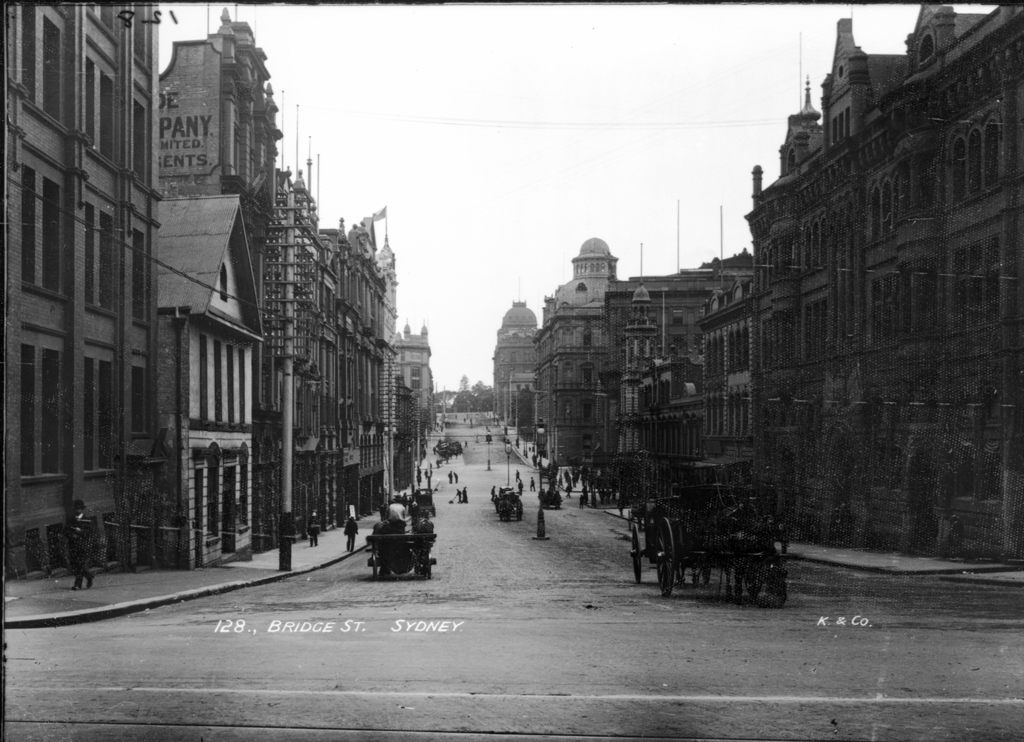
Bridge Street, view east from near George Street ca. 1900

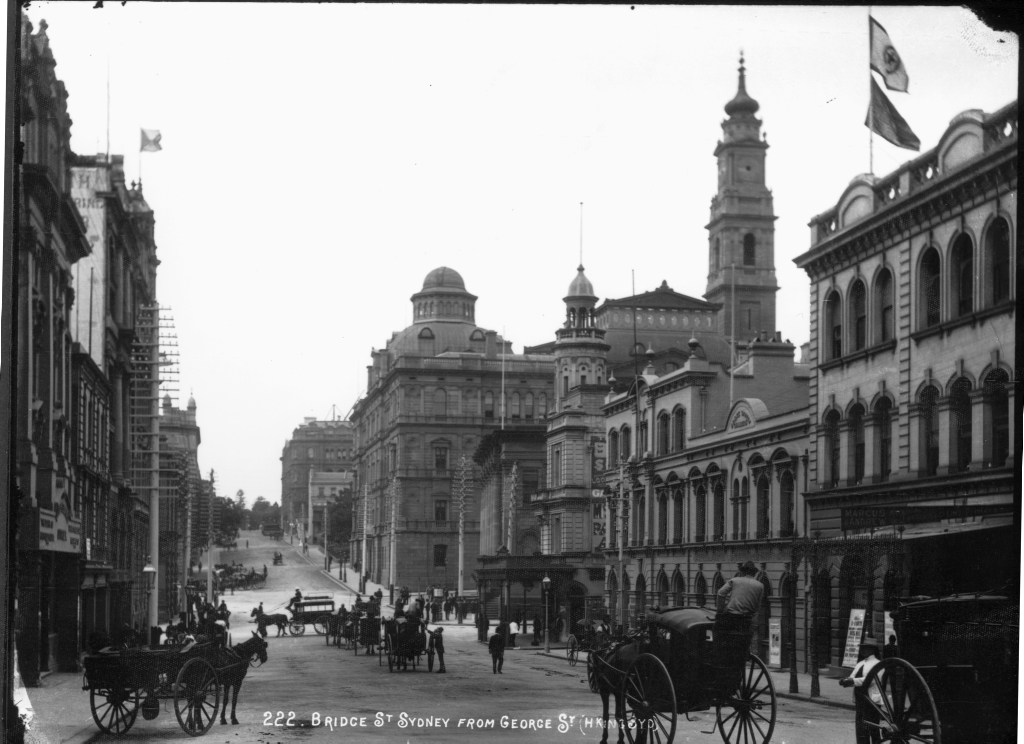
View east along the middle section of Bridge Street, with the Department of Lands building on the right

Many years before Bridge Street was named, it was the site of Sydney's first Government House and was the abode of first Governor of New South Wales, Captain Arthur Phillip. After establishing the site of the settlement, a substantial "temporary" government house was located on the corner of what is now Bridge Street and Phillip Street. It was built under the direction of James Bloodsworth, a convict builder responsible for the construction of most of the colony's buildings between 1788 and 1800.

This building, the first 'permanent' building in Sydney, was completed by 1789 using English bricks, native stone and a quantity of convict baked sandstock bricks from the Sydney region. After the initial completion the house was of two stories in height, contained six rooms and was the hub of the colony for 56 years. Eight successive governors complained of the living conditions within, each making improvements by adding their own extension. It was here on 4 June 1789, that Governor Phillip and his guests celebrated the birthday of King George III. In 1845 the entire complex was demolished to allow access and extend the street to Macquarie Street. The foundations of the house were exposed by archaeologists in 1983. The site, on the corner with Phillip Street, is now occupied by the Museum of Sydney.

In March 1899 workmen installing a telegraph tunnel discovered a copper plate wedged between two stones. It was later found that it was the foundation stone of the first Government House that was laid 15 May 1788. The plate is now displayed at the Museum of Sydney.

== Heritage buildings ==
Bridge Street has a number of significant buildings and sites. The following were listed on the now-defunct Register of the National Estate.

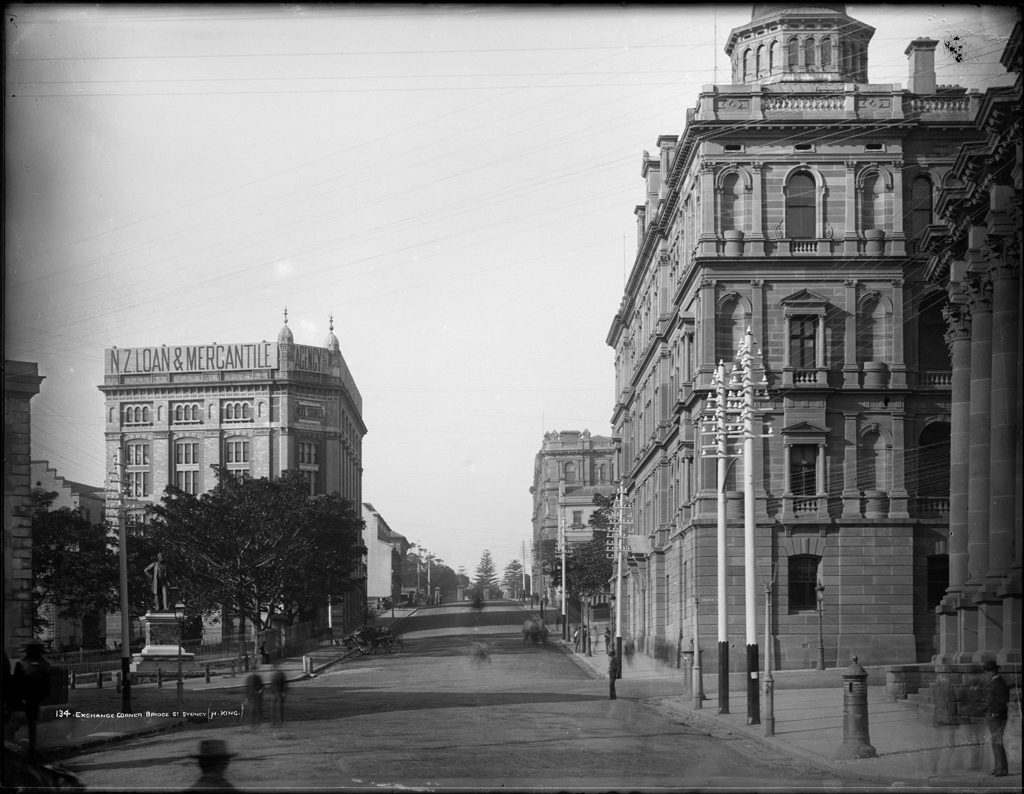
Exchange Corner, the location of the Sydney Stock Exchange Building, on Bridge Street, with Department of Lands building on the right and Macquarie Place on the left, ca. 1900

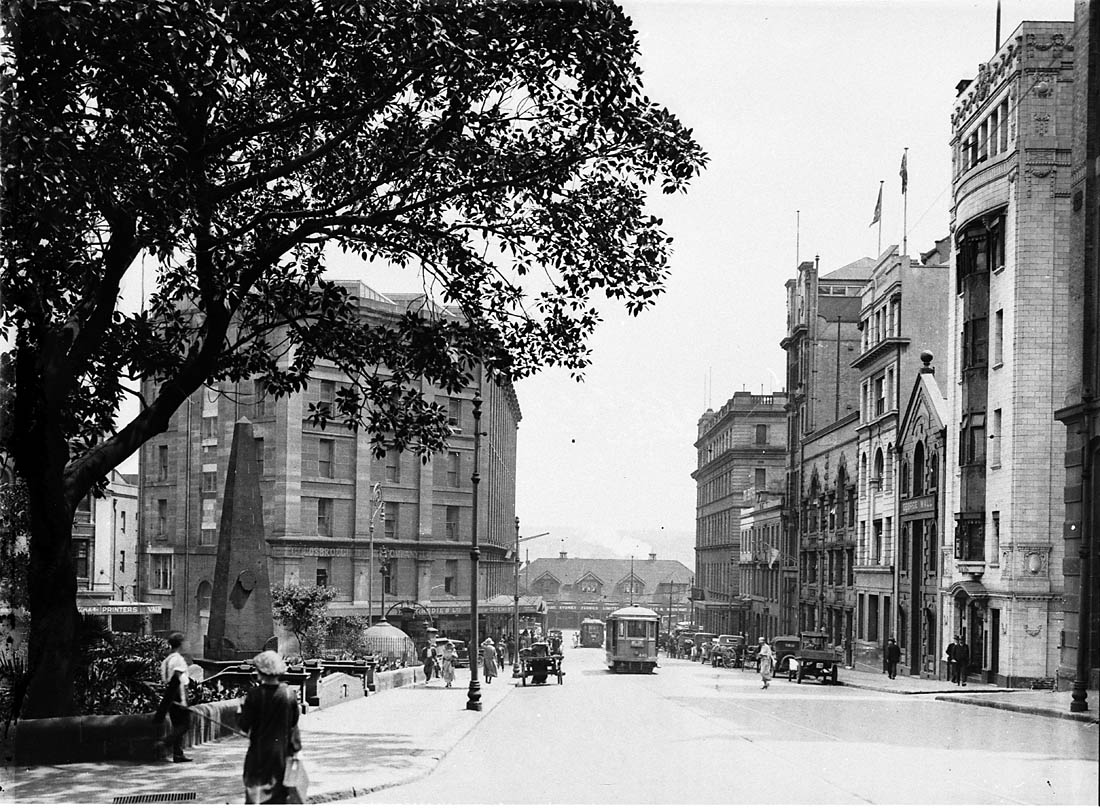
Macquarie Place in the 1920s

- The Department of Lands Building is a sandstone building designed by the Colonial Architect, James Barnet, and built 1877–1890. It is three storeys high and features a copper dome and a clock tower that is a distinctive feature in the area. The building is listed on the NSW State Heritage Register.
- The Department of Education Building is a six-storey, sandstone building designed by the government architect, George McRae. It was built ca. 1912 and features an inner structure of steel and reinforced concrete. The building is listed on the NSW State Heritage Register.
- Burns Philp Building: this three-storey, commercial building was built from 1898 to 1901. It was designed by Arthur Anderson of McCredie and Anderson in a Romanesque style. Like the other buildings, it was constructed predominantly of sandstone, with a combination of dressed stone and rough stone. The interior features elaborate cedar-work. The building is listed on the NSW State Heritage Register.
- The Chief Secretary's Building, also designed by Barnet with later additions by Walter Liberty Vernon, is situated on the south corner of Bridge and Macquarie Streets and constructed in ca. 1878, consisting mainly of dressed sandstone. The building is listed on the NSW State Heritage Register.
- The former Premier's Office or Old Treasury Building is situated on the north corner of Bridge and Macquarie Streets. This two-storey sandstone building was designed by Mortimer Lewis in a Classical Revival style and built ca. 1849. A large extension was designed by Vernon and built ca. 1896. It has more recently been converted for hotel use as part of the InterContinental Hotel Sydney. In 1999 the building was added to the NSW State Heritage Register.
- Macquarie Place Park is an historic site is situated on the north side of Bridge Street and was originally part of the first Government House. Governor Lachlan Macquarie intended it to be a significant public square but it was gradually whittled down over the years. It includes the obelisk designed by Francis Greenway and constructed in 1818; the bronze statue of Thomas Sutcliffe Mort erected in 1883; the cannon and anchor from HMS Sirius, the anchor having been placed on its pedestal in 1907; the Christie Wright Memorial Fountain, and the men's lavatory built in 1908, which features stucco and a glazed dome. In 2010 the site was added to the NSW State Heritage Register.
- Booth House: at 44 Bridge Street, on the corner of Young and Bridge Streets and situated on land which originally formed part of the gardens of First Government House. Built in 1938, this nine-storey building is an excellent and rare expression of the Functionalist style meeting a need for continuous natural light, through bands of windows, to accommodate wool-broking activities on completion. A stylised ram's head is etched into the red granite lintel above the entrance, pale green terracotta tiles remain under copper cladding the uprights between the windows. It is now an unusual mix of commercial and residential units.
- Liner House, also known as Moran House, located at 13–15 Bridge Street, is a heritage-listed office building completed in 1960 for shipping agents, Wilh. Wilhelmsen. The building has since been repurposed and in 1999 was added to the NSW State Heritage Register.

== Gallery ==
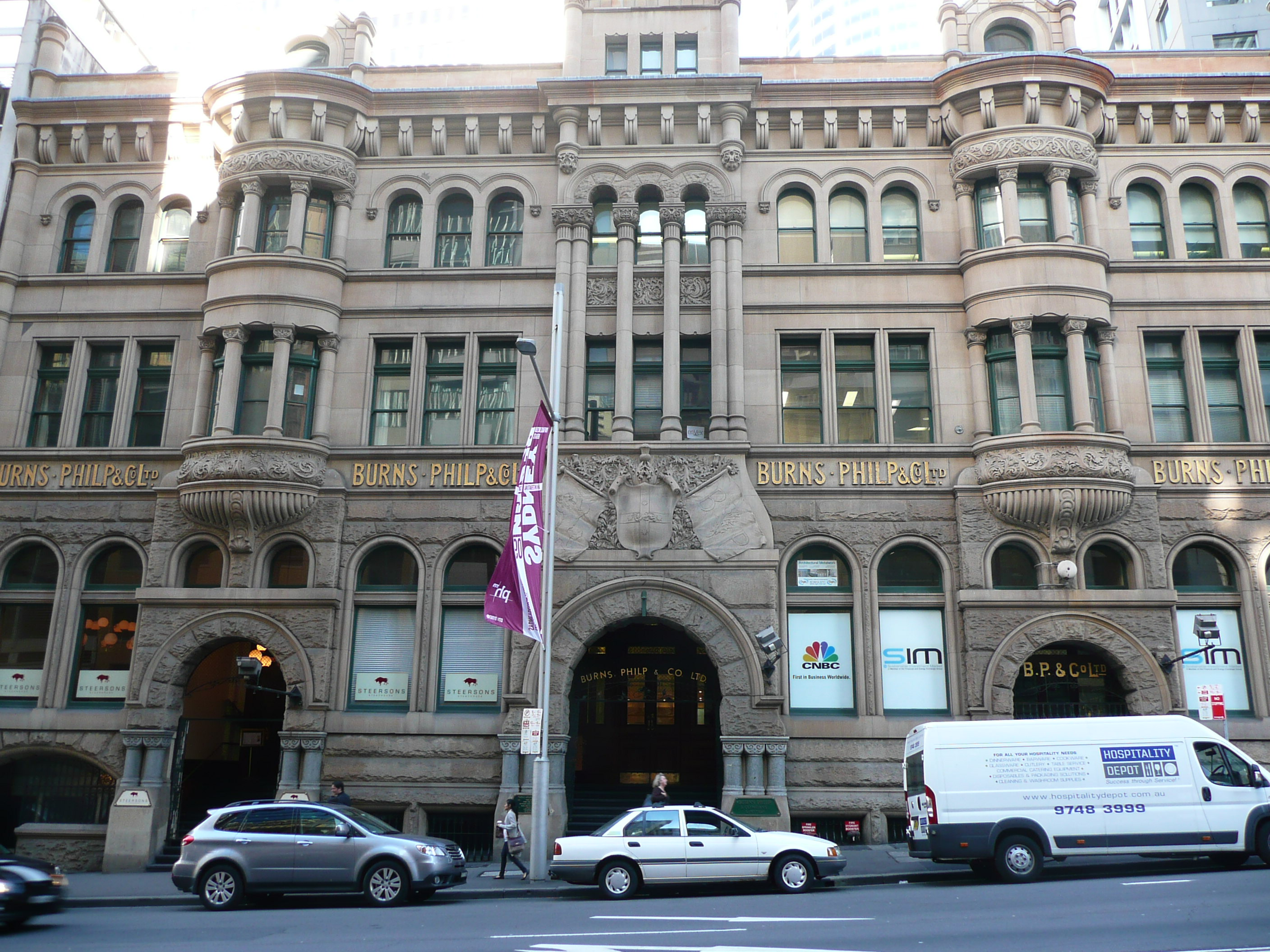
Burns Philp building

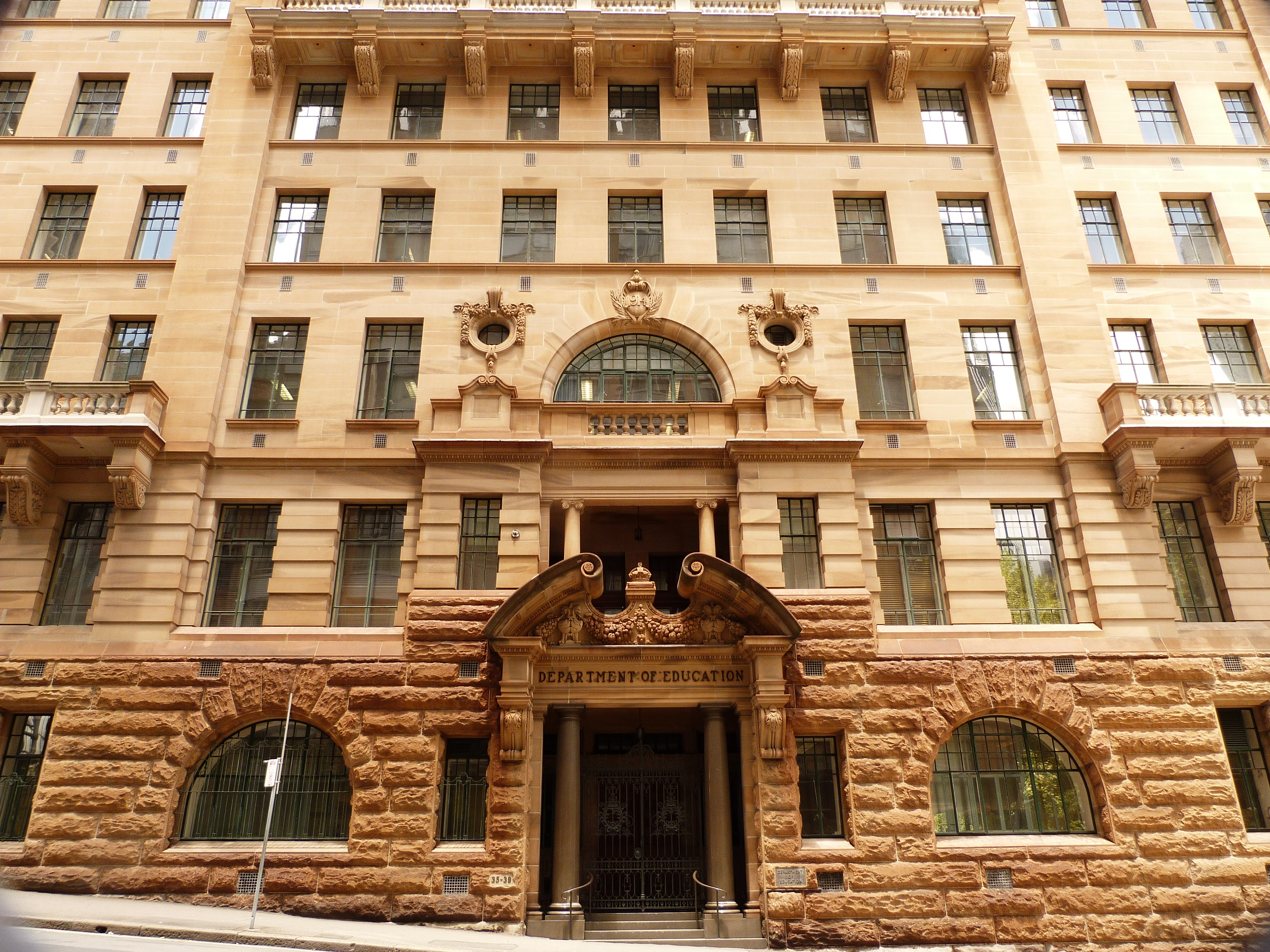
Department of Education building

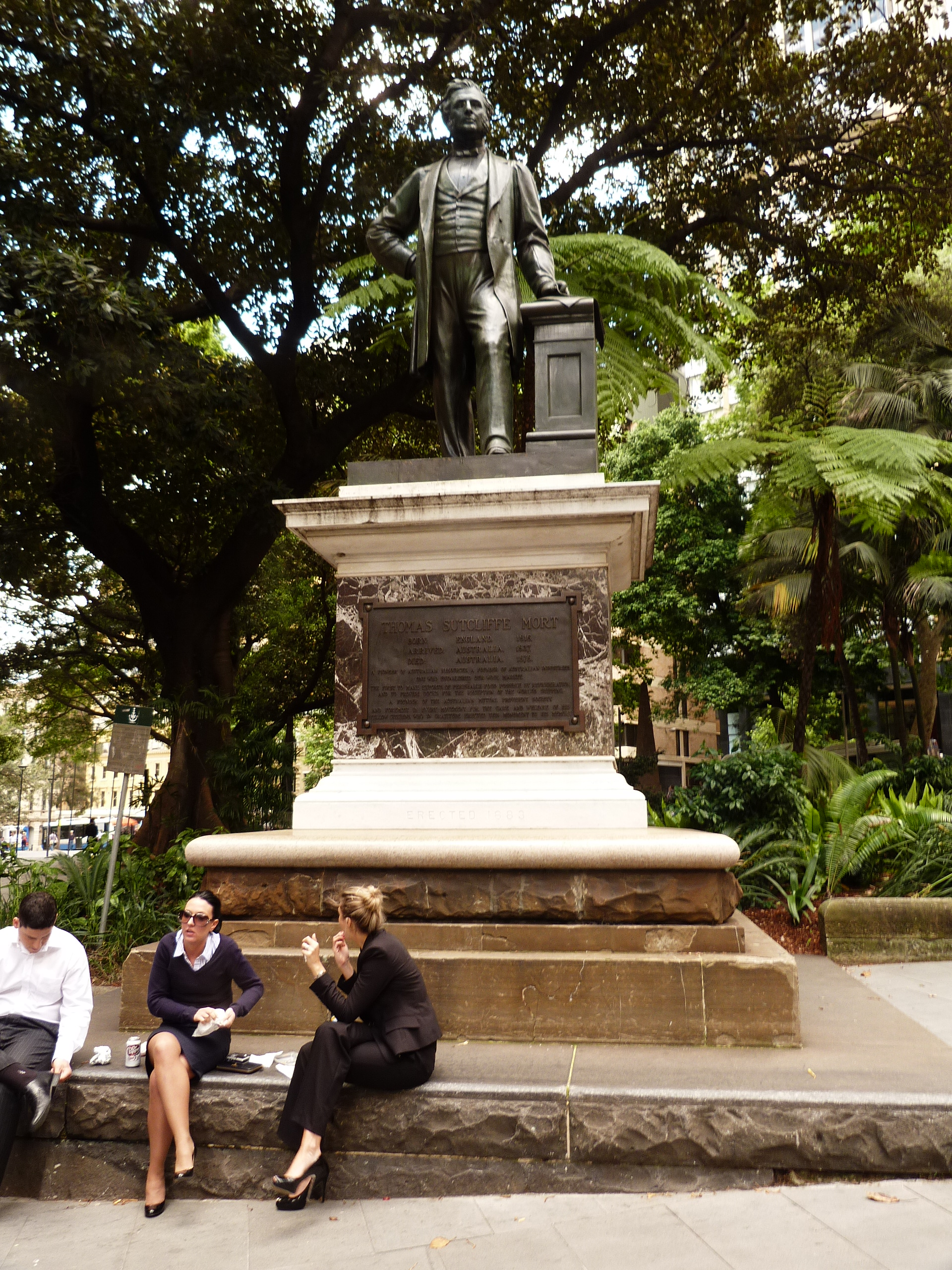
Statue of Thomas Mort, Macquarie Place

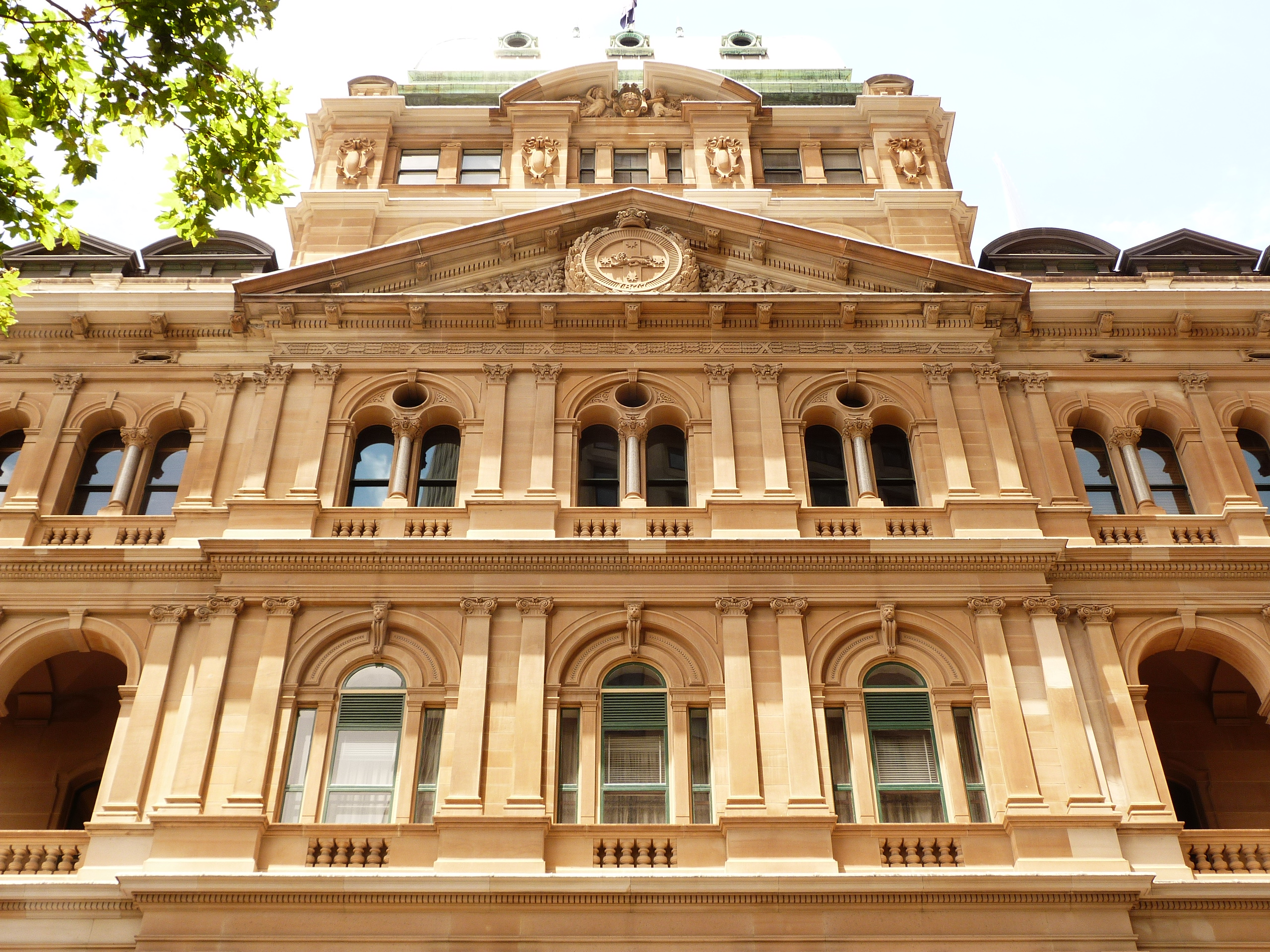
Chief Secretary's Building
