= Treasury Building, Sydney =

Heritage-listed building in Sydney, Australia

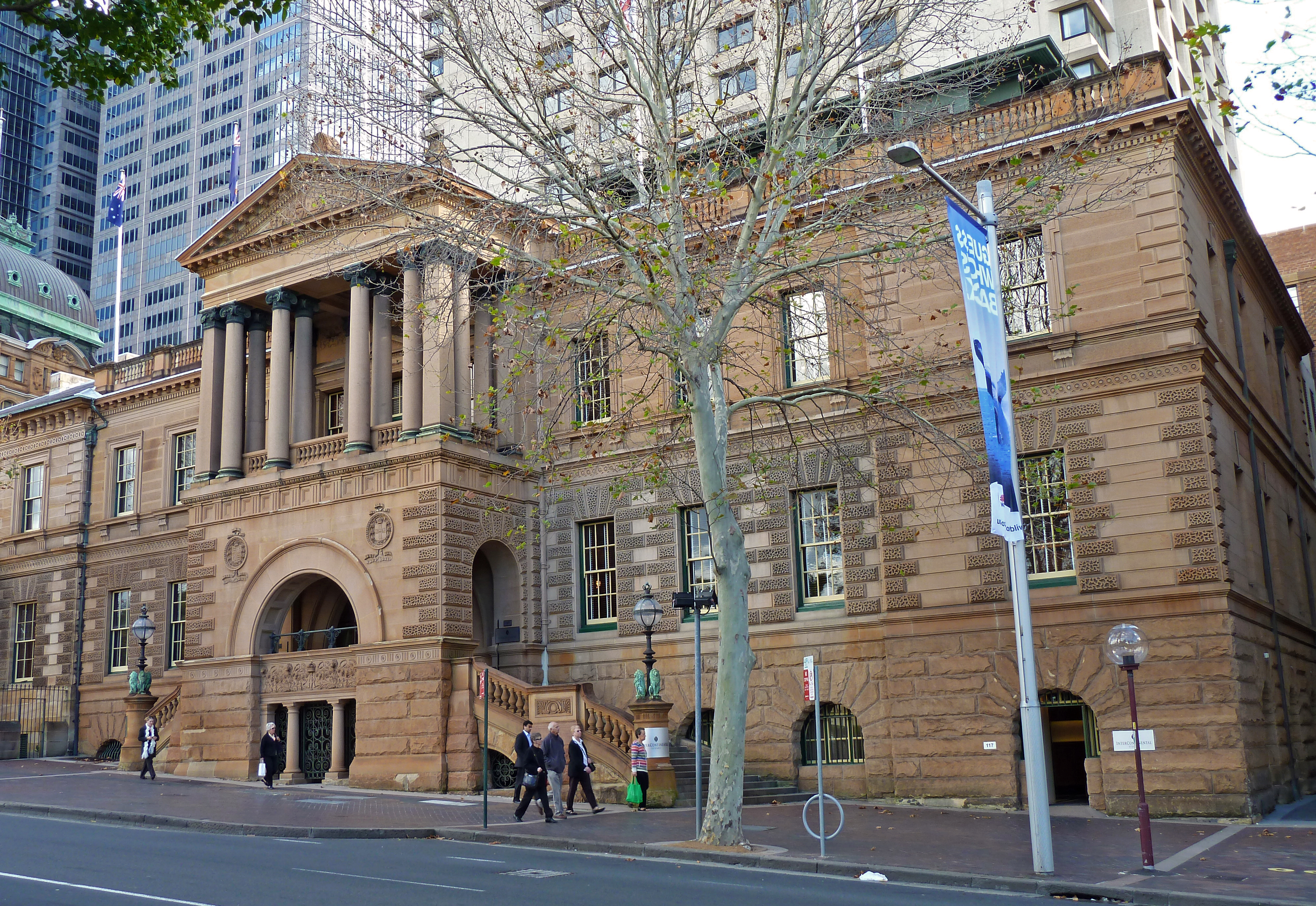
- The former Treasury Building, Macquarie Street façade and portico.

- Location within Sydney
- Former names: Colonial Treasury; The Old Treasury; Treasury Building & Premier's Office
- Alternative names: InterContinental Hotel, Sydney
- Etymology: NSW Treasurer; NSW Treasury

General information
- Status: Completed
- Type: Government administration (former); Hotel
- Architectural style: Victorian Neo-Classical; Italian Palazzo
- Location: 117–119 Macquarie Street, Sydney, New South Wales, Australia
- Coordinates: 33°51′47″S 151°12′45″E
- Construction started: 1849
- Renovated: 1982–1985

Technical details
- Material: Sandstone; timber joinery; iron & stone palisade fence.

Design and construction
- Architects: Mortimer Lewis (1849–1851); Edmund Blacket (1853); Walter Liberty Vernon (1896–1900); George McRae (1916–1919)
- Architecture firm: Colonial Architect of New South Wales

New South Wales Heritage Register
- Official name: Intercontinental Hotel former Treasury Building; Colonial Treasury; The Old Treasury; Treasury Building
- Type: State heritage (built)
- Criteria: a., c., d., e., f., g.
- Designated: 2 April 1999
- Reference no.: 355
- Type: Other – Government & Administration
- Category: Government and Administration

The Treasury Building, or the Colonial Treasury Building, The Old Treasury Building, or the Treasury Building & Premier's Office, is a heritage-listed former government administration building and now hotel located at the junction of Macquarie and Bridge streets in the central business district of Sydney in New South Wales, Australia. Commenced in 1849 and completed in stages in 1851, 1853, 1900 and 1919 in the Victorian Neo-Classical and Italian Palazzo styles by NSW Colonial and Government architects Mortimer Lewis, Edmund Blacket, Walter Liberty Vernon, and George McRae, the building has been used variously by the NSW Treasury, the Audit Office, the Premier's Department, the Police Department, and the Ministry of Transport. In 1981 the building was sold to the InterContinental Hotel group, with a major hotel complex built on part of the site and much of the heritage building restored.

== History ==
In 1849, just before the gold rush, a new building for the Colonial Treasurer and Auditor was commissioned from the Colonial Architect, Mortimer Lewis. The building, in the former garden of First Government House, was finished in 1851, with two frontages, one to Bridge Street for the Audit Office, the other to Macquarie Street for the Treasury. Its design owed a great deal to the Travellers' Club of 1829 in London's Pall Mall. The two separate offices were demarcated by an interior dividing wall. Lewis's successor, Edmund Blacket, added a coach-house and stables to the north by 1853.

The party wall was breached in 1873 when the Treasury took over the Audit Office's area, as well as erecting temporary buildings between the main offices and the stables. The Government Architect, Walter Vernon, added a large fire-proof Strong Room for the safety of documents in 1896–1898 to the north of the stables and in 1898–1900 he provided a Link Building, connecting the Strong Room to the Lewis building along Macquarie Street. This demolished the eastern part of Blacket's stables (and most of the western end went in 1967), leaving archaeological remains of significance. The present Macquarie Street portico dates to these Vernon works of 1898–1900. The Bridge Street wing was altered and extended for the Premier's Department in 1916–1919, to the design, as modified, of the then Government Architect George McRae. The Premier's Department continued to be there until 1967, when the State Office Block was erected.

Thereafter from 1967 until 1982, the Police Department occupied the Bridge Street space created by Lewis and McRae, while the Ministry of Transport had the Macquarie Street sector, where the Strong Room space had already been filled in during the 1940s. An auditorium for the Conservatorium of Music was constructed on the upper level of Lewis's building in 1977. Under Police and Transport, the buildings deteriorated, with undesirable changes to the fabric, until they were vacated in 1981. To accommodate a 31-storey hotel on the western part of the site, largely beyond the area protected by the PCO in 1985, conservation works were undertaken between 1981 and 1985. During 1983 archaeological work uncovered evidence of the 1850s Blacket stable block.

== Description ==
The former Treasury building has fine Georgian elevations of exceptional scale, proportion and detailing. It occupies an important location in central Sydney. It contributes greatly to the sandstone townscape aesthetic of the Government precinct as well as being an excellent example of the craft work of its period.

Sandstone; timber joinery; iron & stone palisade fence Sandstone; timber joinery; face brick with stone dressings to external walls & colonnade to cortile.

== Heritage listing ==
As at 24 September 2001, The former Treasury Buildings group (within the Intercontinental Hotel complex) is an outstanding example of the state's 19th to early 20th century public buildings and forms part of what is arguably the finest group of these sandstone buildings in NSW. The architectural forms and detailing of the group, with its strong links to Victorian "Neo-Classical" traditions, make it an extremely fine exemplar of this style and reflect important contemporary links with English architectural practice. The facade of Lewis's original building in particular is a premier example in NSW of 19th century "Italian Palazzo" style based closely on a London model. The bold but sympathetically related Vernon additions fronting Macquarie Street are impressively proportioned and detailed and represent an excellent and perhaps unique example of late Victorian eclectic architecture in NSW. The site's contribution to the significant streetscapes of Macquarie and Bridge Streets is both large and indisputable, with the siting, form, materials and detailing enhancing the adjacent precincts of early buildings. Historically the building group is significant because of its long association with the NSW Treasury and the state treasurer's and premier's offices.

Treasury Building, Sydney was listed on the New South Wales State Heritage Register on 2 April 1999 having satisfied the following criteria.

The place is important in demonstrating the course, or pattern, of cultural or natural history in New South Wales.

Historically the building group is significant because of its long association with the NSW Treasury and the state treasurer's and premier's offices. It also provides an interesting historical account of the work of a number of the state's Colonial Architects from the mid 19th to the early 20th century. The site is also an important representative of the conservation and adaptation policies and pressures of 1980s Sydney reflecting a major achievement in contemporary philosophical and practical heritage conservation within the heart of Sydney's CBD. Has historic significance at a State level.

The place is important in demonstrating aesthetic characteristics and/or a high degree of creative or technical achievement in New South Wales.

The former Treasury Buildings group (within the Intercontinental Hotel complex) is an outstanding example of the state's 19th- early 20th century public buildings and forms part of what is arguably the finest group of these sandstone buildings in NSW. The architectural forms and detailing of the group, with its strong links to Victorian "Neo-Classical" traditions, make it an extremely fine exemplar of this style and reflect important contemporary links with English architectural practice. The facade of Lewis's original building in particular is a premier example in NSW of 19th century "Italian Palazzo" style based closely on a London model. The bold but sympathetically related Vernon additions fronting Macquarie Street are impressively proportioned and detailed and represent an excellent and perhaps unique example of late Victorian eclectic architecture in NSW. The site's contribution to the significant streetscapes of Macquarie and Bridge Streets is both large and indisputable, with the siting, form, materials and detailing enhancing the adjacent precincts of early buildings. Has aesthetic significance at a State level.

The place has a strong or special association with a particular community or cultural group in New South Wales for social, cultural or spiritual reasons.

The site and its group of early stone buildings remains associated in the popular imagination - by name and historical links with its early Treasury and state government functions.

The place has potential to yield information that will contribute to an understanding of the cultural or natural history of New South Wales.

During 1983 archaeological work uncovered evidence of an 1850s stable block. The site has in the past shown important archaeological resources and both building and site have the potential to provide further information on site use and building development sequences and techniques.

The place possesses uncommon, rare or endangered aspects of the cultural or natural history of New South Wales.

The facade of Lewis's original building in particular is a premier example in NSW of 19th century "Italian Palazzo" style based closely on a London model.

The place is important in demonstrating the principal characteristics of a class of cultural or natural places/environments in New South Wales.

The former Treasury Buildings group (within the Intercontinental Hotel complex) is an outstanding representative example of the state's 19th and early 20th century public buildings and forms part of what is arguably the finest group of these sandstone buildings.

== See also ==
- Australian non-residential architectural styles
- History of Sydney
