= Burns Philp Building, Sydney =

Burns Philp Building
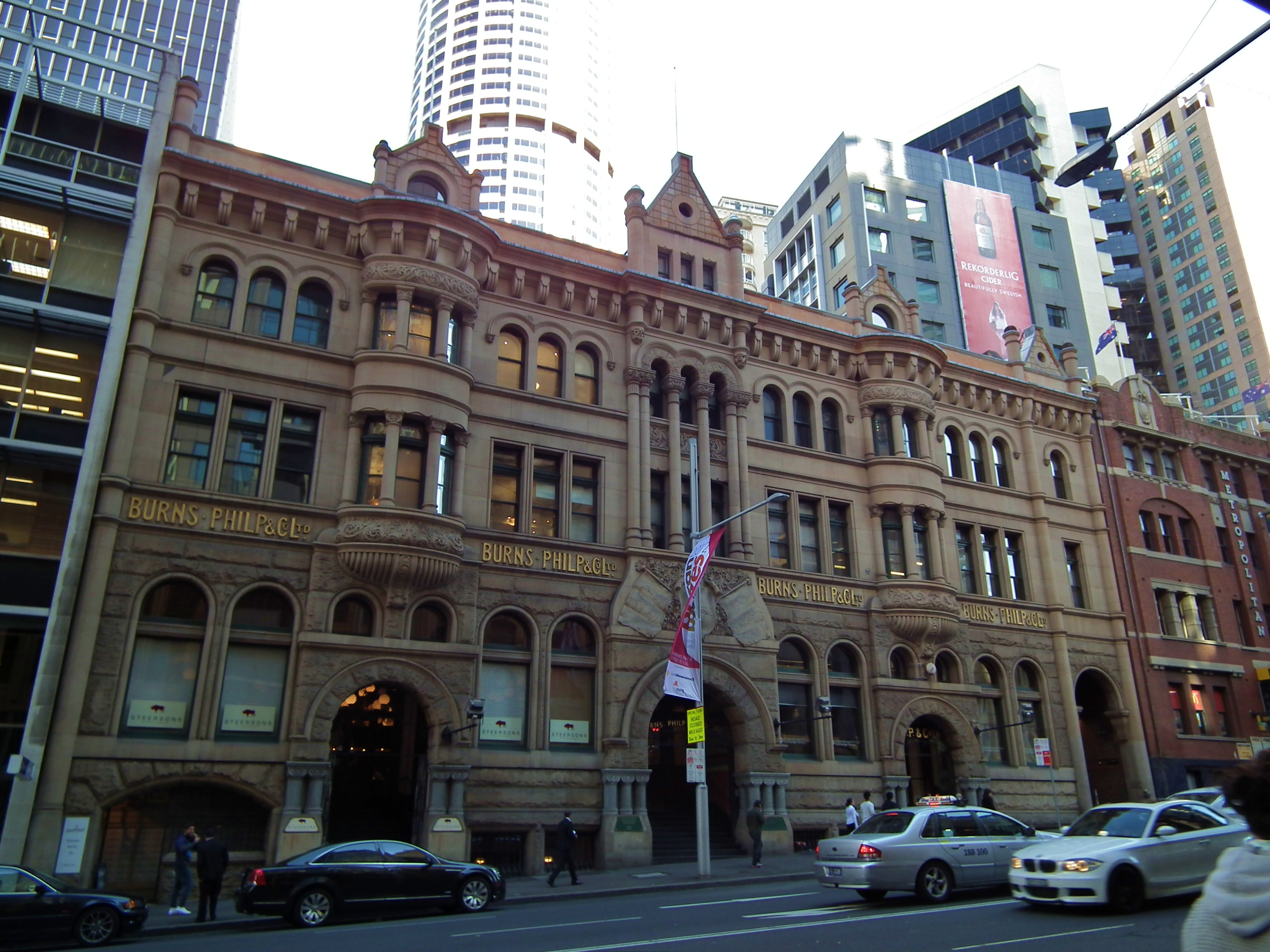

- Location within Sydney Location within Australia
- 33.8639°S 151.2080°E
- Location: 7 Bridge Street, Sydney central business district, City of Sydney, New South Wales, Australia

History
- Built: 1899–1900

Site notes
- Architect(s): A.L. and G. McCredie
- Architectural style: Federation Romanesque

New South Wales Heritage Register
- Official name: Burns Philp Building
- Type: State heritage (built)
- Designated: 2 April 1999
- Reference no.: 347
- Type: Commercial Office/Building
- Category: Commercial
- Builders: Mitchell and King

The Burns Philp Building is a heritage-listed commercial building located at 5–11 Bridge Street in the Sydney central business district, in the City of Sydney local government area of New South Wales, Australia. It was designed by A. L. and G. McCredie and built from 1899 to 1900 by Mitchell and King. It was added to the New South Wales State Heritage Register on 2 April 1999.

== History ==
The Burns Philp Building was built and established in 1899 for the Burns Philp company. Before the building the land was occupied by early settlers and eventually utilised by a lumberyard and a series of five buildings occupied by a number of small businesses including a watchmaker, loan office, tea-rooms, a bedding manufacturer and a warehouse.

James Burns was born in 1846, originally from Glasgow. Burns and his older brother sailed and landed in Brisbane in 1862. By 1872 they had become partners in a grocery business in Townsville, before expanding into shipping. Over time Burns became a shrewd businessman, his business prospered "due to his wonderful business acumen, probity, magnetic personality and untiring efforts".

Robert Philp was also born in Glasgow in 1852. Philp immigrated with his family in 1862. In 1874 Burns offered Philp a job with a view of partnership. In April 1883 the company was incorporated under NSW law with Philp based in Townsville and Burns in Sydney. Philp resigned in 1893 after financial difficulties, but went on to become the Premier of Queensland 1899-1903.

At this time Burns Philp occupied a building, No 10 located directly opposite the site on Bridge Street, but by 1898 this building was heavily pressed with increasing demands on the company and on the building. By 1899 it was obvious that the building had to be expanded. In April 1898 Burns made an offer for the 109 feet frontage to Bridge Street opposite the existing building. This offer was declined, a second was made and in May 1899 the land had been purchased. By October 1899 twenty-eight tenders had been received for the new building. The successful tender came from Mitchell and King at 23,875 pounds. By the end of 1900 leases had been signed to Weber Lohmann and Co., the Bellambi Coal Co., J. R. Bexter Bruce, Captain R. M Phillips, William Honston, H. W. Peabody and Co. and the North Queensland Insurance Co. All these companies had a considerable voice in the finishing work, adding their own requests for fittings.

In 1908 structural alterations, decorating and furnishing was carried out. During the 1950s, 1960s, later 1970s and 1980s significant changes were made to the original building to expand for new accommodation for new tenants, its capabilities and its presentation to suit the changing image of the company.

In January 1996, the rear of the building suffered damage from a fire in the adjacent George Patterson House, which partially collapsed onto the Burns Philp Building.

The building was sold for $15 million in October 1997 due to the financial collapse of Burns Philp. The contents of the building were auctioned by Lawsons on Wednesday 25 March 1998, which included photographs, paintings, maps, shipping memorabilia and furniture.

It was converted to strata title and sold as separate commercial offices in 1998. The basement has often been leased as a restaurant since Burns Philp's departure; initially becoming the Stock Exchange Hotel, in 2018, it is occupied by the Bridge Street outlet of the Fratelli Fresh restaurant chain.

== Description ==
The Burns Philp Building is located at the south-western end of Bridge Street, Sydney. It comprises a basement, ground level, mezzanine level and three upper levels.

The Burns Philp Building is a finely designed and ornamented Federation city office building, with a sandstone exterior on a rusticated plinth, arched openings and vaulted entry vestibules. The facade is symmetrical apart from a small car opening to one side giving access to a laneway. The interiors are largely intact with very fine decorative painted metal ceilings, high-quality timber partitioning, elaborate cast-iron columns, cedar joinery and polished stone finishes to the foyer. The building used an innovative construction system combining load bearing walls, brick cruciform columns, central stair shaft, cast iron columns, wrought iron beams, timber joists and Oregon flooring. This effectively separated the facade from the main structure of the building (even though the front wall is loadbearing). The building is in excellent condition and is almost intact apart from several recent alterations to openings on the main facade.

== Heritage listing ==
The Burns Philp Building has state historical significance for its relationship, and continuous association from 1901–1997, with the Burns Philp Company, a major Australian maritime company who traded with the Pacific Islands. The building is one of the few identified extant works of the firm A. L. & G. McCredie, a major Australian architectural practice of the later nineteenth century.

The building has state aesthetic significance for its rare architectural quality, which includes the richly carved and modelled facade in the Romanesque style made popular by American architect Henry Hobson Richardson and the finely executed sandstone carving and interior finishes. The building makes a major contribution to and is a key element in the Macquarie Place / Bridge Street Conservation area.

The building is of state technical significance as one of the first uses of composite construction and is a landmark building for the combination of new structural techniques and a fine facade treatment. Burns Philp maritime history contributes to our understanding of Australia's early trade and economy.

It is socially significant, as it is well known for its association with the Burns Philp Company, who successfully traded for more than a century along the east coast of Australia and the Pacific Islands and repatriated the Kanakas to the Pacific Islands. The Burns Philp Building exhibits the Scottish roots of the company by use of motifs such as the Scottish thistle. Burns Philp became associated with the development of Townsville.

Burns Philp Building was listed on the New South Wales State Heritage Register on 2 April 1999 having satisfied the following criteria.

The place is important in demonstrating the course, or pattern, of cultural or natural history in New South Wales.

The Burns Philp Building is of State significance as building designed for a long established maritime company who continuously occupied and retained ownership of the building from 1901–1997.

The place has a strong or special association with a person, or group of persons, of importance of cultural or natural history of New South Wales's history.

The building is of State significance for its associations with the company of Burns Philps, a large shipping company that, in its day, made a large economic contribution to the State.

The building is of State significance for its associations with the architectural firm A. L. & G. McCredie. The building is one of the few identified extant works of this major Australian architectural practice of the late nineteenth century.

The place is important in demonstrating aesthetic characteristics and/or a high degree of creative or technical achievement in New South Wales.

The Burns Philp Building is of State significance for its facade and interiors, which display a high architectural and aesthetic quality and demonstrate the skills of local craftsmen and the capability of sandstone for architectural ornamentation and structure. The incorporation of a lane entrance is an unusual and distinctive feature of the Bridge Street elevation.

The Burns Philp Building, with its richly carved and modelled facade, makes a major contribution and is a key element in the Macquarie Place / Bridge Street Conservation area, one of the most important historic townscape precincts in the City of Sydney.

The Burns Philp Building is a rare example of the Federation Romanesque style made popular by American architect Henry Hobson Richardson.

The building is an unusual and rare example in the city of building over a public laneway.

The place has a strong or special association with a particular community or cultural group in New South Wales for social, cultural or spiritual reasons.

The building is well known for its association with the Burns Philp Company, a major Australian maritime commercial entity, who successfully traded for more than a century along the south east coast of Australia and the Pacific Islands. The Burns Philp Building exhibits references to the Scottish roots of the company, by use of motifs such as the Scottish thistle, in the strong corporate image they desired to be known and recognised by.

The building indicates the Burns Philp Company's confidence in the future (possibly related to Federation), by the use of materials and finishes normally seen on banks and government buildings.

The building is socially significant due to its association with both Burns and Philp. Philp played a major role in the development of Townsville.

The place has potential to yield information that will contribute to an understanding of the cultural or natural history of New South Wales.

The Burns Philp Building is of State significance as one of the first uses of composite construction of steel, timber masonry and cast iron. It is a landmark building for the combination of new structural techniques and fine facade treatment. It was one of the first uses of cast and wrought iron structure after its early manufacture.

The Burns Philp (South Sea) Company Limited operated in the Pacific Islands and contributes to an understanding of Australia's early trade and economy. In 1960, Burns Philp won the tender to supervise the repatriation of the Kanakas (labourers brought from Pacific Islands, usually to work in the sugar fields or in other large scale agricultural industries) to the Pacific Islands.

== See also ==
- Australian non-residential architectural styles
