= Cecil Purser =

Australian doctor

Cecil Purser FRACP
- Born: 16 December 1862; Castle Hill, New South Wales
- Died: 13 January 1953 (aged 90); Wahroonga, New South Wales
- Education: Newington College; University of Sydney; Royal College of Physicians; Royal Australasian College of Physicians
- Occupation: physician
- Spouse: Louisa Victoria (née Brierley) died 1937
- Children: 3

Cecil Purser (16 December 1862 – 13 January 1953) was an Australian physician and served terms as chairman of Royal Prince Alfred Hospital and vice-chancellor and deputy chancellor of the University of Sydney.

== Birth and education ==
Purser was born at Castle Hill, New South Wales, the eldest son of bootmaker and later orchardist James Purser, and his Scottish wife Mary Ann, née Kyle. He attended school locally in Castle Hill and later at Newington College (1879-1881). At the end of 1881 he was named Dux of the College and received the inaugural Schofield Scholarship. In 1882 he went up to the University of Sydney and was a resident of St Andrew's College. Whilst at university he was captain of the cricket XI and was a noted athlete. He graduated as a Bachelor of Arts in 1885 and as a Bachelor of Medicine and Chemistry in 1890.

== Medical career ==
After appointments as a resident medical officer and a medical superintendent at Royal Prince Alfred Hospital, Purser began private practice in Petersham in 1893. In the same year he married Louisa Victoria Brierley in the Congregational church. After his marriage Purser and his new wife lived in the Sydney suburb of Lewisham, New South Wales. Louisa Pursers's sister Florence was Mrs A.B. Shand. Purser became an honorary at Royal Prince Alfred in 1896, and from 1912 until his death he was a consultant physician with rooms in Macquarie Street, Sydney. From 1925 until their deaths the Pursers lived on the tenth floor of The Astor in Macquarie Street. The prevention and treatment of pulmonary tuberculosis was his speciality. He was a member of the Tuberculosis Advisory Board and the New South Wales Board of Health and of the councils of the War Memorial Hospital, Waverley, and Crown Street Women's Hospital. He joined the board of the RPAH in 1909 and was vice-chairman for three years before his appointment as chairman in 1924. During his term of office the Rockefeller Building was constructed on the hospital campus. In 1933 he resigned as chairman of Prince Alfred due to his annoyance at the shortage of government financial support. On the foundation of the Royal Australasian College of Physicians in 1938, Purser was appointed a Fellow.

== Educational appointments ==
Purser was elected to the senate of the University of Sydney in 1909 and was vice-chancellor in 1917, 1918 and 1923. In 1924 and 1925 he served as deputy chancellor. He was an examiner within the faculty of medicine for 19 years from 1911. Purser served on the councils of St Andrew's College, Wesley College, (where the Cecil Purser Wing (1943) is named in his honour), The Women's College, Newington College, and was for a term president of the Old Newingtonians' Union.

== Community involvement ==
From 1893 he was a member of the Royal Society of New South Wales and for a term chaired the public health and kindred sciences section of the Society. Purser was honorary major in the Australian Army Medical Corps Reserve.

== Portrait ==
- Jerrold Nathan - held by the University of Sydney

Awards
Preceded by Inaugural	Schofield Scholarship; Dux of Newington College; 1881	Succeeded by George Abbott
