= 93–97 Macquarie Street, Sydney =

Heritage-listed building in Sydney, Australia

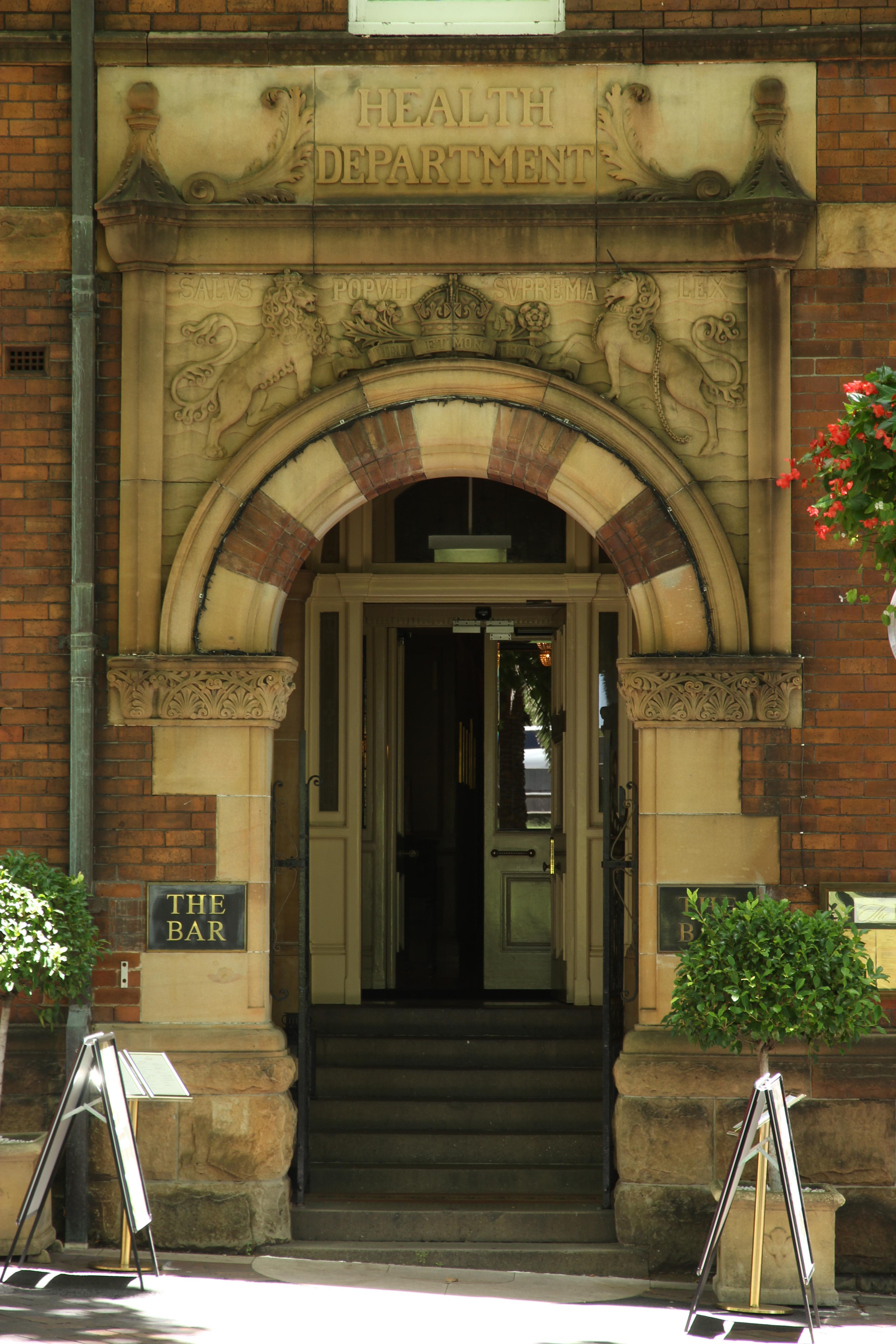
- Sandstone portico of the former Health Department building, now part of the Sir Stamford Hotel, Circular Quay.

- Location within Sydney Location within Australia
- 33.8621°S 151.2128°E
- Location: 93–97 Macquarie Street, Sydney central business district, City of Sydney, New South Wales, Australia

History
- Built: 1896–1898

Site notes
- Architects: Walter Liberty Vernon; NSW Government Architect
- Architectural style: Federation Free Style

New South Wales Heritage Register
- Official name: Health Department Building (former); Sir Stamford; Ritz Carlton; Venereal Disease Clinic; STD Clinic; Hospital Admissions Depot; Former Health Board Offices
- Type: State heritage (built)
- Designated: 9 October 2013
- Reference no.: 1912
- Type: Office building
- Category: Government and Administration

93–97 Macquarie Street, Sydney or formerly the Health Department building is a heritage-listed former government office, health clinic and hospital admissions depot and now hotel at 93–97 Macquarie Street, in the Sydney central business district, in the City of Sydney local government area of New South Wales, Australia. It was designed by Walter Liberty Vernon and NSW Government Architect and built from 1896 to 1898. It is currently part of the Sir Stamford Hotel, which formerly was a Ritz Carlton Hotel. In its history it has also been used as the Venereal Disease Clinic, STD Clinic, Hospital Admissions Depot and Former Health Board Offices. It was added to the New South Wales State Heritage Register on 9 October 2013.

== History ==
=== Health Department ===
Prior to 1897, the Health Department was housed in a large private residence on Macquarie Street, initially sharing the premises with a branch office of the Department of Public Instruction, and later with the Parliamentary Draftsman. By 1889, the department's operations had expanded significantly, occupying the entire building. In 1893, the attic spaces were converted to accommodate a pathological and bacteriological laboratory.

By 1895, it was clear that these premises were inadequate; both too small and inappropriate: not "accommodation of the kind requisite to a Health Department conducted and equipped on modern lines". Towards the end of 1895, the government gave instructions for the erection of a new building on the present site. The land had been allocated to the use of the department years earlier, and occupied by a temporary building which served the Government analyst for a laboratory. This coincided with the establishment of the Department of Public Health and the passing of the Public Health Act in 1896 which gave greater responsibility to government in the area of public health. With this responsibility came greater staff and facility needs.

==== Macquarie Street offices ====
The new building was erected under the supervision of Government Architect W. L. Vernon, and occupied from 1 October 1897. It was not completed until 1898. The final cost of the building was approximately £7,528. Vernon described the appearance of the building in his annual report for 1898 as "of a somewhat different type to Government offices of the city generally, being a Gothic structure of combined brick and stone work." He said that the building had "been specially designed to meet the important and increasing requirements of this branch of the Government Service."

The building was a three-storey structure of red brick with freestone dressings and a basement which utilised the slope of the hill on the western side. A large public office occupied the ground floor together with the board room, the centre for notification of infectious diseases and offices for the head of department and his clerical assistants. The Analytical Branch took most of the second floor where there was also an office for the veterinary staff, while the third floor was entirely taken up by the microbiological and pathological laboratories. Equipped with electric motors, these were completed on 24 August 1898. Part of the basement was devoted to "rough work" and a crematory furnace. The remainder was used by the Public Vaccination Station and the Hospital Admission Depot which had direct access to the yard where ambulances waited to ferry patients to the allotted hospitals. Lit by gas, the new offices also enjoyed "telephonic communication".

The building served several important roles during the first decades of the twentieth century. From 3 July 1913 free smallpox vaccinations were made available on a daily basis at the Hospital Admission Depot as well as at other city and suburban town halls as a measure to control the smallpox epidemic in Sydney. During World War I, Robert Paton, the first Director General of Public Health, and his staff established a Night Recruiting Depot at the Hospital Admission Depot. Between 3 August 1915 and 15 February 1916, when recruiting was limited to Victoria Barracks, this centre encouraged enlistment with an after-hours facility which proclaimed its presence with an electric sign. Open every night, the depot was voluntarily staffed by twelve to twenty departmental officers, including doctors from head office or one of the state hospitals. The department also assisted enlistment in other practical ways, arranging for those with defective teeth to attend the Dental Clinic and offering remedial treatment for such disabilities as hernia and varicose veins. These services ensured a high acceptance rate among those who applied there.

Paton believed the state's public health legislation to be less advanced than that of other states. Although hampered by staff shortages in World War I he gave priority to assisting the military authorities. He advocated open-air treatment for some conditions and helped to develop the Coast Hospital as an infectious diseases hospital and the Waterfall Home for Consumptives. Five special hospitals were opened during his term. With his deputy, W. G. Armstrong, he planned the campaigns against major smallpox and pneumonic influenza epidemics. He organised successfully against the last major smallpox epidemic from 1913 to 1916. His preparation for the variola epidemic of 1913 was also the basis of the state plan to meet the impact of the pandemic of influenza in 1919. He became the first commissioner under the Venereal Diseases Act 1918, and practised privately in venereology for a short time after his retirement.

=== The Sydney STD Centre ===
From about 1930 until the mid-1980s, the building was used as a venereal disease (STD) clinic. However, the rise in incidence of AIDS in the community saw the beginning of the end of the use of this building for the purpose. AIDS-related complex and lymphadenopathy diseases were proclaimed notifiable diseases under the Public Health Act 1984. Concern for the high incidence in sexually transmitted diseases (STD) brought proposals to increase services for tracing these while introducing additional social education. This program was stepped up in response to a departmental report in March 1985 showing the high community cost of STDs. New clinics were opened at Wollongong and Liverpool while existing clinics at Newcastle and the Prince of Wales hospitals were improved. Training in STDs was introduced into medical and nursing courses and the University of Sydney introduced a Master of Medicine (Veneology), possibly the first in the world.

In October 1986, the Sydney STD Centre was moved from the former Health Department building at 93 Macquarie Street to the restored Nightingale Wing of Sydney Hospital. Additional STD Clinics were opened at Port Kembla, Liverpool and the Western Suburbs Hospital, Croydon.

=== Repurpose as a hotel ===
The removal of the Sydney STD Centre saw the end of the use of the building for health purposes. In 1988-90 the building was adapted as part of the 106 room luxury Ritz Carlton Hotel. Most of the 106 guest rooms and associated facilities were accommodated in the new building on the adjoining site. Approximately one third of the former health department building was demolished to the south west as were the single storey ancillary wings on the south and west sides. The Macquarie and Albert Street facades were retained. The remaining interior of the building was substantially modified and converted into a limited number of upper storey guest rooms and a ground floor bar. Original interiors are limited to the lower sections of the staircase, stair hall leadlight window and front floor joinery. The remainder appears to have been rebuilt. The building is currently occupied by the Sir Stamford at Circular Quay Hotel, a member of the Australian hotel group, Stamford Hotels and Resorts.

== Health Board offices in the context of the work of Walter Liberty Vernon ==
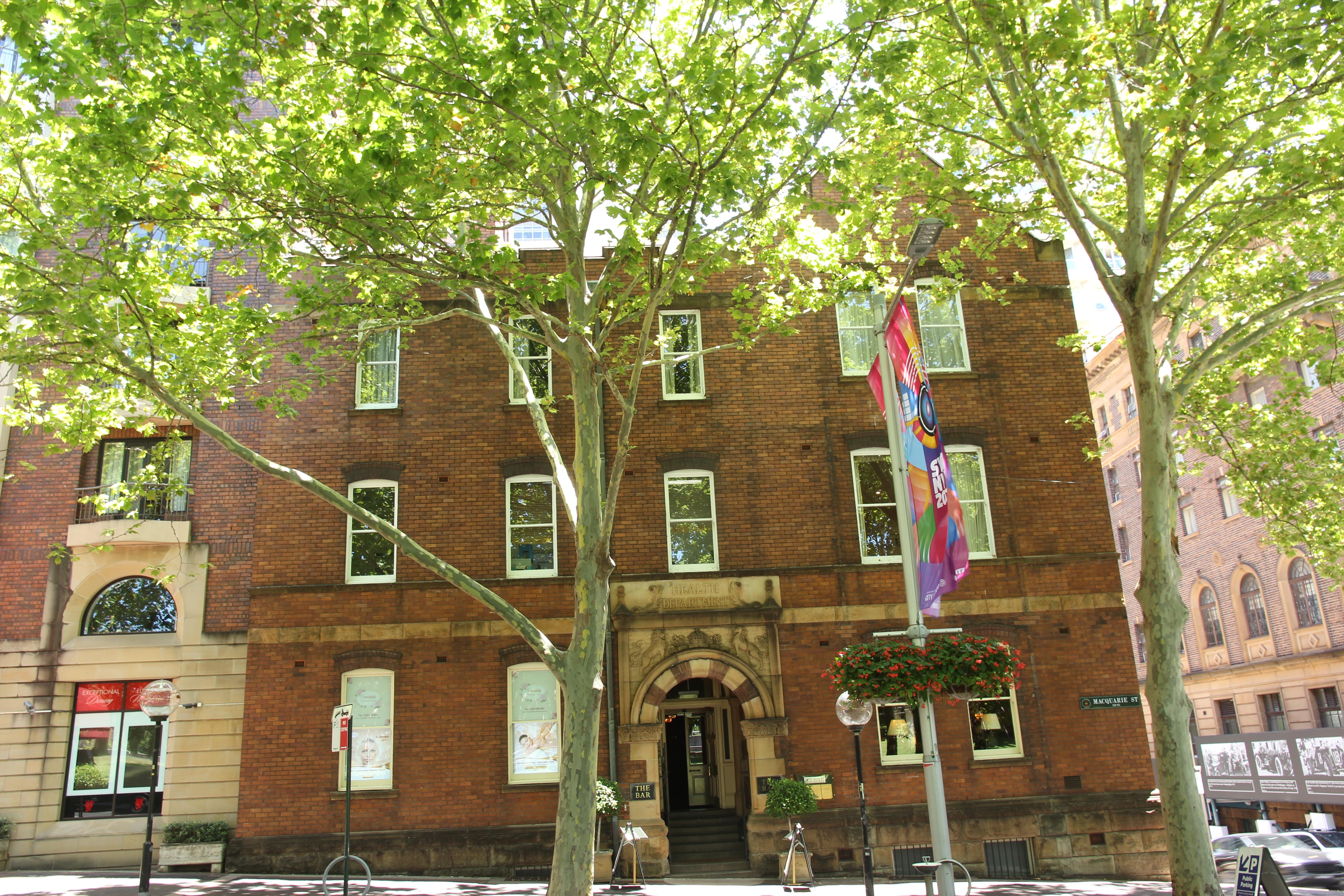
The Macquarie Street red-faced brick facade of the former Health Department building, adjoining the main entrance to the Sir Stamford Hotel, at left.

The former Health Board Offices mark a stylistic change in Vernon's work, and therefore the Government Architects office, from the Queen Anne Revival style to the emerging Federation Free Style type of architecture in metropolitan Sydney. This reflected the influence of the international Arts and Crafts movement. Like the Glasgow School of Art, the Health Board offices are constructed on a steep site, with a main entrance at the upper level as is the Glasgow School of Arts designer, Charles Rennie Mackintosh was in the process of designing the School of Arts during 1897 when Vernon visited Scotland and was not constructed for another decade. Therefore, the influence is more likely to be the work of established Scottish architects particularly James MacLaren. David Walker has traced the influence of MacLaren's work in Edinburgh and Stirling on Mackintosh's early work.

The Scottish influences were noted when the building was completed. De Libra commented on the' Scottish tinge of composition in the picturesqueness of the skyline'. Vernon had visited Edinburgh primarily to look at hospitals but may have seen the recently completed Ramsay Gardens and Well Court (a workers' housing complex) where the revival of the Scottish vernacular was evident. The similarity in the design of the Health Board offices in Sydney with contemporary Scottish work rests in the picturesque composition, carefully designed to respond to the sloping site, the use of details drawn from unpretentious, traditional buildings and the use of sandstone.

The details of the Heath Board Offices reflected a movement away from the influence of merchants houses and town halls of Northern Europe. Instead, the oriel windows, prominent chimneys and crenellations were more reflective of traditional English buildings found in Vernon's photograph collection. The influence of the robust Norman buildings were also evident, particularly in the use of rock faced sandstone to the rear staircase. The building represented an increasing freedom from established architectural precedent.

The details of the Health Board Offices required a high degree of craftsmanship in both the brickwork and the carved stone elements. Darker brickwork was employed to the window heads, a detail that would be widely used in Federation-style domestic architecture, shops and warehouses. Like the Banco Court in St James Road Sydney, the Health Board building has exquisite carvings employing neoclassical motifs, including the base of the oriel window, where they would have been used in English architecture.

The new Heath Board Offices established the architectural vocabulary that continued to be employed by the Government Architects Branch as part of the urban renewal within the resumed areas of Sydney at the beginning of the twentieth century. The Free Style also became the architectural vocabulary for new public buildings in the inner ring of suburbs surrounding the city centre.

== Description ==
The Federation Free Style building is a three-storey plus basement brick former office building constructed on a steep site on what is a prominent Macquarie Street corner. The eastern frontage to Macquarie Street is the main frontage. The secondary frontage (northern) is to Albert Street. The southern and western elevations were substantially altered in the 1980s to connect the building to the main hotel structure. As part of this work the building, which originally had a square footprint, was reduced in size to an "L" shape. The interior was almost completely removed.

The base of the building, designed to cope with the steeply sloping site, is of rock face sandstone, as are the string courses. Sandstone stringcourses mark the first floor and the upper window line of the second floor. The remainder of facade is red face brick. A darker brick used for the arched window heads is present on the ground, first floor and some of the second floor windows. A double-pitched slate roof is partially concealed behind sandstone castellated parapets.

On the Macquarie Street frontage there is fine sandstone carving with neoclassical motifs around the semi-circular entrance doorway, chimney and bay window. The carved coat of arms over the main archway, together with the carved seal of the Board embedded in the chimney on the Albert Street facade, are the only signs of the building's former use as government offices. The corner of the building on Macquarie Street is marked by a gable asymmetrically related to the entry doors. The brickwork is flush. The existing window joinery is a mix of double hung sash windows and windows with Queen Anne style upper multipaned sashes. The entrance is marked by a tessellated tile threshold, fine wrought iron gates and trachyte steps.

The Albert Street facade is characterised by a corbelled chimney and oriel window. A second corbelled chimney is also located on the small visible portion of the rear (western facade). The oriel window, with its small panes to the upper sash, is one of the few surviving elements representing the Queen Anne Revival aspects of the building. A redundant colonnade staircase features a decorative wrought iron balustrade and a squat Romanesque style sandstone column and wrought iron gate. Traces of the Richardsonian Romanesque style are evident in the stone arches to the stair at the north-western corner of the building.

Original interiors are limited to the lower sections of the staircase, a few walls, stair hall leadlight window and front floor joinery. The remainder appears to have been rebuilt. The building is currently occupied by the Sir Stamford at Circular Quay Hotel.

=== Condition ===
As at 12 May 2011, the Macquarie and Albert Street facades and to a lesser extent, the Albert Street return facades, and the roof of the remnant building are largely intact. The western colonnade has been altered and three windows on the western facade have been blocked up. The roof has been modified with dormers in some places.

The interior was radically altered during the 1980s hotel adaptive reuse works. At this time 30% of the building was demolished and all the floors and ceilings were demolished. Only some internal walls, the street facades and the remnant roof structure remained in-situ. At this time new concrete slabs were poured and keyed into the remnant brick walls and the interior of the shell entirely refitted. At this time the main timber staircase was entirely removed and the stair hall rebuilt.

The Macquarie and Albert Street facades, and to a lesser extent the Albert Street return façade and the roof structure, are largely intact. The interior has been radically altered with view original details surviving.

=== Modifications and dates ===
- 1980s – adaptive reuse for hotel purposes.
- 1990; 1998 – alterations.

== Heritage listing ==
As at 7 August 2014, the former Health Department building has state heritage significance as the surviving fabric of an important early building in the professional work of the Government Architect, W L Vernon that influenced the style of buildings produced by the newly formed Government Architect's Office. It also has significance for its ability to reflect the status of Macquarie and Bridge Streets as a prestige address for many government institutions, becoming an important component of the precinct and exemplifying increasing government commitment to areas of social welfare such as health.

Health Department Building was listed on the New South Wales State Heritage Register on 9 October 2013 having satisfied the following criteria.

The place is important in demonstrating the course, or pattern, of cultural or natural history in New South Wales.

The former Health Department building has state heritage significance as the surviving fabric an important early building in the professional work of the Government Architect, W L Vernon that influenced the style of buildings produced by the newly formed Government Architect's Office. It also has significance for its ability to reflect the status of Macquarie and Bridge Streets as a prestige address for many government institutions, becoming an important component of the precinct and exemplifying increasing government commitment to areas of social welfare such as health.

The place has a strong or special association with a person, or group of persons, of importance of cultural or natural history of New South Wales's history.

The former Health Board building has state significance for its association with Walter Liberty Vernon, his early and influential work as Government Architect, and the newly formed Government Architect's Office. It also has state significance for its associations with the public health initiatives of the first Director General of Public Health Robert Paton, who was influential in the control of infectious diseases in Sydney in the early years of the twentieth century.

The place is important in demonstrating aesthetic characteristics and/or a high degree of creative or technical achievement in New South Wales.

The remnant facades of the former Health Board Building has aesthetic significance at a State level as an early example of the buildings designed by the then newly formed Government Architects Office, and as high quality and well resolved examples of the Federation Free Style. This particular style was sufficiently successful and influential to become particularly identifiable with the identity of public health and hospital buildings designed by the Government Architect's Office under Walter Liberty Vernon's direction and an important early example of the design language which came to characterise much of the work from Vernon's office. It demonstrates the stylistic development of Vernon, providing evidence of the influence of the English Arts and Crafts movement combined with his interest in the muscular Romanesque design language of American architect Henry Hobson Richardson

The place has a strong or special association with a particular community or cultural group in New South Wales for social, cultural or spiritual reasons.

The building has state social heritage significance as a focal point for public health services until its closure in the 1980s, well known within the social services, nursing and health systems and throughout the wider community. It serves as a visual representation of the nineteenth century push for a centralised agency that responded to a range of public health issues. since the passing of the Public Health Act 1896. It has long been associated at a local level, within the broader community consciousness, as a purpose built, self contained facility that provided treatment and services for a range of infectious or notifiable diseases that had an impact on the health of the community as a whole.

The place is important in demonstrating the principal characteristics of a class of cultural or natural places/environments in New South Wales.

The former Health Department building has state significance as a visual representation of the public building's designed by the Government Architect's Office following the appointment of Walter Liberty Vernon as Government Architect.

== See also ==
- List of hotels in Sydney
- Australian non-residential architectural styles
