= History House, Sydney =

Heritage-listed building in Sydney, Australia

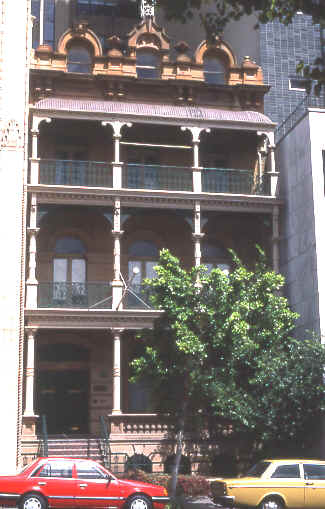
- History House, 1980s

- Location within Sydney Location within Australia
- 33°51′51″S 151°12′45″E
- Location: 133 Macquarie Street, Sydney central business district, City of Sydney, New South Wales, Australia

History
- Built: 1853–1872
- Built for: George Oakes

Site notes
- Architect: George Allen Mansfield
- Architectural style: Victorian Filigree
- Owner: Royal Australian Historical Society

New South Wales Heritage Register
- Official name: History House; Wickham House
- Type: State heritage (built)
- Designated: 2 April 1999
- Reference no.: 692
- Type: Terrace
- Category: Residential buildings (private)

History House, Sydney is a heritage-listed former residence, doctor's rooms and clubhouse and now historical society located at 133 Macquarie Street in the Sydney central business district, New South Wales, Australia. It was designed by George Allen Mansfield and built from 1853 to 1872. It is also known as Wickham House. The property is owned by the Royal Australian Historical Society. It was added to the New South Wales State Heritage Register on 2 April 1999.

== History ==
=== The site ===
The area in which History House is located was once a part of the Governor's Domain, the extensive grounds associated with the First Government House in Bridge Street which was occupied by successive Governors of New South Wales from 1788 until 1845. These grounds were subdivided into building allotments in the late 1840s, after the First Government House had been demolished and the Governor had moved into the Gothic grandeur of the present Government House. Eight allotments on the west side of Macquarie Street between Bent Street and Bridge Street were put up for sale in 1847 but the land on which History House was later to be built did not find a buyer until 1849 when it was purchased, together with the allotment immediately to the south, by Joseph Nottingham Palmer. The price was £10 per foot of the frontage, a total of £300. Between 1849 and 1857 the land changed hands three times and was owned by Thomas Fisher, a barrister and son-in-law of William Charles Wentworth; Thomas Woolley, a merchant and William Bland a medical practitioner, all well known members of Sydney society. With the substantial rise in land prices due to the demand for housing following the gold rush, the sale price of the two allotments increased to over £3,000 by 1853 when they were purchased by William Bland but there is no evidence that any building had been built on the site of History House at this date. The two allotments were finally sold separately in 1857 one to George Oakes and the other John Black.

No. 133 Macquarie Street, Sydney, the home of the Royal Australian Historical Society and now known as History House was designed in 1871 by the architect George Allen Mansfield for his uncle George Oakes, a well known pastoralist and politician. The house was the last in the row of quality Victorian town houses to be built on the west side of Macquarie Street, between Bridge Street and Bent Street. It was probably completed in 1872.

=== The owner and the architect ===
George Oakes purchased the land in 1857 when he was a member of the Legislative Assembly representing Parramatta, but it was not until 1871 that plans were drawn up for a house on the site. During the 1860s Oakes had spent a considerable time overseas, but by the early 1870s he returned to his Australian interests including politics. In 1872 he was elected to the Legislative Assembly representing East Sydney and probably used his new house in Macquarie Street as a town house when Parliament was sitting. His family home was in Parramatta.

The architect for Oakes' Macquarie Street house was his nephew George Allen Mansfield. Mansfield was a prominent architect of the period and from 1867-1879 was architect to the Council of Education as well as maintaining his private practice in partnership with his brother. He is best known for his school buildings such as the Crown Street, Cleveland Street and Sussex Street schools and also for major institutions such as the Royal Prince Alfred Hospital. Mansfield was instrumental in establishing architecture as a profession in New South Wales. He was a founder of the Institute of Architects and its President from 1871 until 1876. His drawings for History House, dated December 1871, are still in existence. These were given to the Institute of Architects (NSW Chapter) by the Royal Institute of British Architects (RIBA) and may have formed a part of the portfolio which Mansfield submitted to the RIBA when he applied for membership. He had the distinction of being the first Australian to be elected a Fellow of the RIBA. Mansfield's 1871 drawing of the front elevation of the house for George Oakes is titled "a first class residence in Macquarie Street".

=== The house ===
As originally built, the house which Mansfield designed for Oakes was a typical Victorian upper middle class town house - a gentleman's family residence. On the ground floor were a fine entrance hall, drawing room and dining rooms, the public parts of the house and on the first and second floors a study, bedrooms and dressing rooms. The front verandah and balconies commanded a view over the Botanic Garden and harbour while small balconies at the back of the house, overlooking the back yard, provided additional light and through ventilation. A back wing at right angles to the main house contained the service areas and servants' quarters. A second staircase in this wing provided access to the house by doors on the half landings of the main stairs so that the servants could move about the house unobtrusively. The basement, which contained the kitchen, was accessible not only from the front of the building but also from Phillip Lane at the rear.

=== From Club to doctors' rooms ===
The use of the house as a private residence was short lived. By 1879, when Oakes was appointed to the Legislative Council, his house had become the premises of the Reform Club of which Oakes was a founder member. On 10 August 1881 after leaving Parliament House, Oakes was knocked down in Elizabeth Street by a steam tram and died a few hours later. After his death ownership passed to his son Arthur, a medical practitioner and was let, first from about 1882 to 1884 to politician William Adams Brodribb and then from about 1887 to 1889 to the Warrigal Club, much favoured by squatters when visiting from the country. From 1892 until 1922 the house was used as a boarding house, as were many other such buildings in Macquarie Street. In 1922 the house was purchased by Dr George Armstrong and was used as doctors' consulting rooms.

In 1927 the distinguished surgeon, Dr George Bell, purchased the house and used it both as his residence and as consulting rooms. For many years this part of the city remained comparatively peaceful but by 1952 this had changed and while Dr Bell continued to use the house for consulting rooms he and his wife no longer resided there. By 1969 when the Royal Australian Historical Society acquired the house it was occupied by a syndicate of doctors, including Dr Bell, and was called "Wickham House". It was structurally sound but many internal alterations and additions had been made to divide the large rooms into consulting rooms and offices. White painted partitions and linoleum concealed much of the beauty of the original structure.

=== A home for the Royal Australian Historical Society ===
In 1901 when the Royal Australian Historical Society was founded it had neither the funds nor the ambition to own a home of its own. Instead the Society met in a number of different venues and was eventually provided with rooms in the Department of Education building in Bridge Street. In 1941, forty years after its foundation, the Society acquired its own premises in a former wool store in Young Street. This served the Society well but by 1957 it was apparent that the site would eventually be required for a large scale redevelopment plan proposed by the AMP Society. After very lengthy negotiations and when the AMP Society had eventually acquired all of the other sites in the area bounded by Phillip, Young and Bridge Streets the RAHS finally had to move. "Wickham House" was available for purchase and was acquired for the RAHS by the AMP Society, substantially on an exchange basis for the Young Street premises.

In order to make the house suitable for use by the Society, restoration and construction work was carried out, under the direction of Barry Swain of Peddle, Thorp & Walker. The back wing, formerly the service wing and servants' quarters, was demolished to make way for a lift and fire stairs and an auditorium and first floor extension was constructed. The main public rooms of the house were restored for use as reception rooms and upstairs the first and second floors were converted for use as offices, library and museum. The Society moved in to its new home in 1970 and the house was renamed "History House". It was officially opened by His Excellency the Governor-General of Australia, Sir Paul Hasluck, Patron of the Society, on 12 November 1971.

Since its acquisition by the Society much work has been carried out to maintain and enhance this important and now rare example of the town houses which once graced much of Macquarie Street. The external fabric has been repaired and the drawing room and dining room, once again used as public rooms, have been redecorated and furnished in a manner appropriate to the period of the house. Original paint colour schemes in the drawing room and dining room were discovered and restored during work in 1985 by Clive Lucas & Partners. Much of the beauty of the house lies in its fine timber work. The staircase is of cedar as are the doors and door cases with carved mahogany detailing. The entrance hall is floored with a parquetry design made from about a dozen different species of timber.

== Heritage listing ==
History House was listed on the New South Wales State Heritage Register on 2 April 1999.

== See also ==
- Australian residential architectural styles
