= Alexander Shand (barrister) =

Australian barrister

A. B. Shand KC
- Born: 26 December 1865; Ulladulla, New South Wales
- Died: 3 October 1949 (aged 84); Darlinghurst, New South Wales
- Education: Newington College; University of Sydney
- Occupations: Barrister; King's Counsel
- Spouse: Florence Amelia (née Brierley)
- Children: John Wentworth Shand QC (1897–1959) son
- Parent(s): Mary (née Barclay) and John Shand
- Relatives: Alec Shand QC (1929–2011) grandson Dr Cecil Purser brother-in-law Adam Shand great-grandson

Alexander Barclay Shand (26 December 1865 – 3 October 1949) was an Australian barrister and King's Counsel. He became a leading legal figure in NSW. Shand refused an invitation to become a New South Wales Supreme Court Judge but served as a Royal Commissioner.

== Biography ==
Shand was born in Ulladulla, New South Wales, to John Shand and Mary (née Barclay). John Shand (1825–1891) had arrived in Sydney in 1853 as a stonemason before becoming a farmer and finally a police magistrate at Penrith Court. Shand Snr founded a legal dynasty that produced three generations of barristers. A. B. Shand, as he came to be known, was educated at Newington College commencing in 1880. He went up to the University of Sydney and graduated as a Bachelor of Arts in 1884. Following graduation and articles, Shand was admitted to the New South Wales Bar in 1887. He was the Crown Prosecutor on the NSW western circuit in 1895-6 and took silk in 1906. He became a leading member of the Bar Council. His wife, Florence (née Brierley), became a tireless worker for the poor and infirm and sat on the boards of various hospitals, schools and women's auxiliaries. She died in October 1929. Mrs Shand was the sister of Louisa Victoria, Mrs Cecil Purser (née Brierley). Shand retired in 1930 and lived in retirement in Vaucluse, New South Wales, until his death at St Vincent's Hospital, Sydney.
