= The Astor (Sydney) =

High-rise building in Sydney, Australia

Coordinates: 33°51′50″S 151°12′45″E

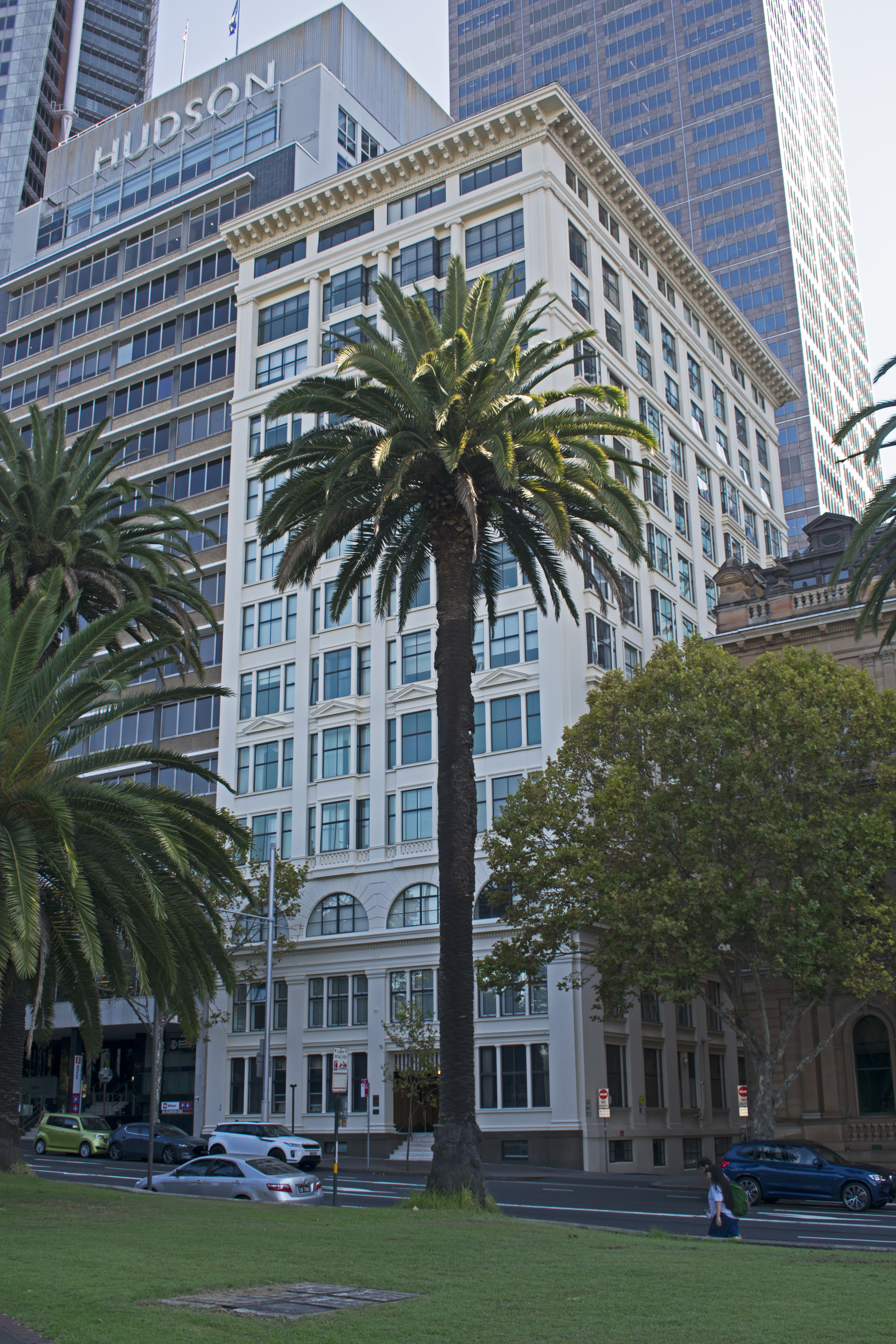
The Astor seen from the northeast

The Astor is a high-rise residential building in Sydney, New South Wales, Australia. It is located at 123–125 Macquarie Street. It was designed by Donald Esplin and Stuart Mill Mould, (Note: There are many references to these architects on Trove, and Google brings more about Esplin.) and the construction was completed in 1923. It has 13 floors, and the total height is 56 metres (184 ft).

The design was inspired by Chicago skyscrapers of that time. The building was made in the interwar Free Classical style and has elements such as Doric and Ionic columns. Each floor had four flats, 52 flats in total. At the time it was completed in 1923, The Astor was the highest residential building in Australia, as well as the largest reinforced concrete building in the country. On 25 October 1923, a rooftop party was held to celebrate the opening of the building. The party was attended by George Fuller, the Premier of New South Wales.

The construction was initiated by businessman John O'Brien and his wife Cecily. The Astor was built by and (as of 2023) remains the property of The Astor Ltd. Each shareholder has equal rights, independently of the size of the flat. Both architects were among the shareholders.

The building was listed as heritage by the National Trust in 1980. In 2023, a hundred years after the completion of the building, an exhibition about The Astor was held in the Caroline Simpson Library in Sydney.
