= Macquarie Street, Sydney =

Street in Sydney, New South Wales, Australia

Macquarie Street, Sydney New South Wales
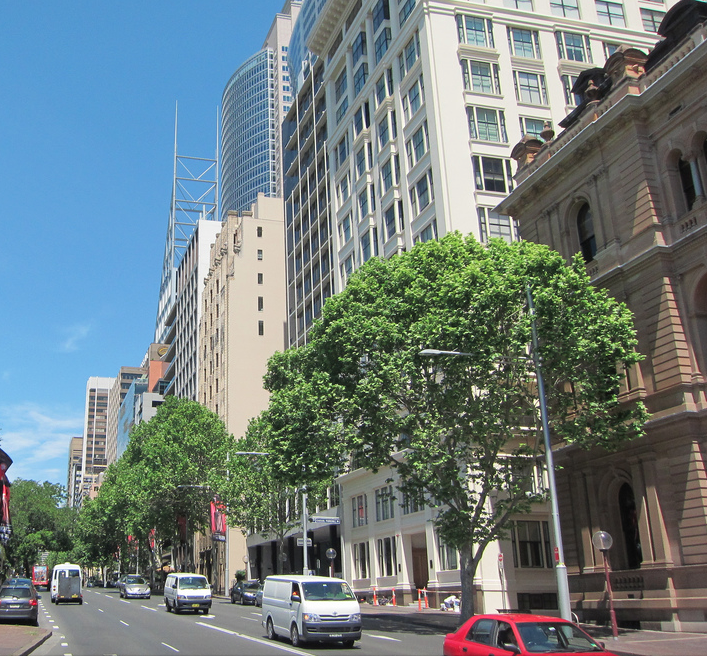
- Central section of Macquarie Street, looking south (2011)
- Coordinates: 33°51′32″S 151°12′49″E (Northern end); 33°52′11″S 151°12′43″E (Southern end)

General information
- Type: Street
- Length: 1.2 km (0.7 mi)

Major junctions
- Northern end: No through road Bennelong Point
- Bridge Street; Cahill Expressway; Hunter Street; King Street
- Southern end: Prince Albert Road; St James Road; Sydney CBD

Location(s)
- LGA(s): City of Sydney
- Major suburbs: Sydney CBD

Macquarie Street is a street in the central business district of Sydney in New South Wales, Australia. Macquarie Street extends from Hyde Park at its southern end to the Sydney Opera House at its northern end. Apart from connecting these two major landmarks, the key government institutions of the state of New South Wales are all located on this street.

== History ==
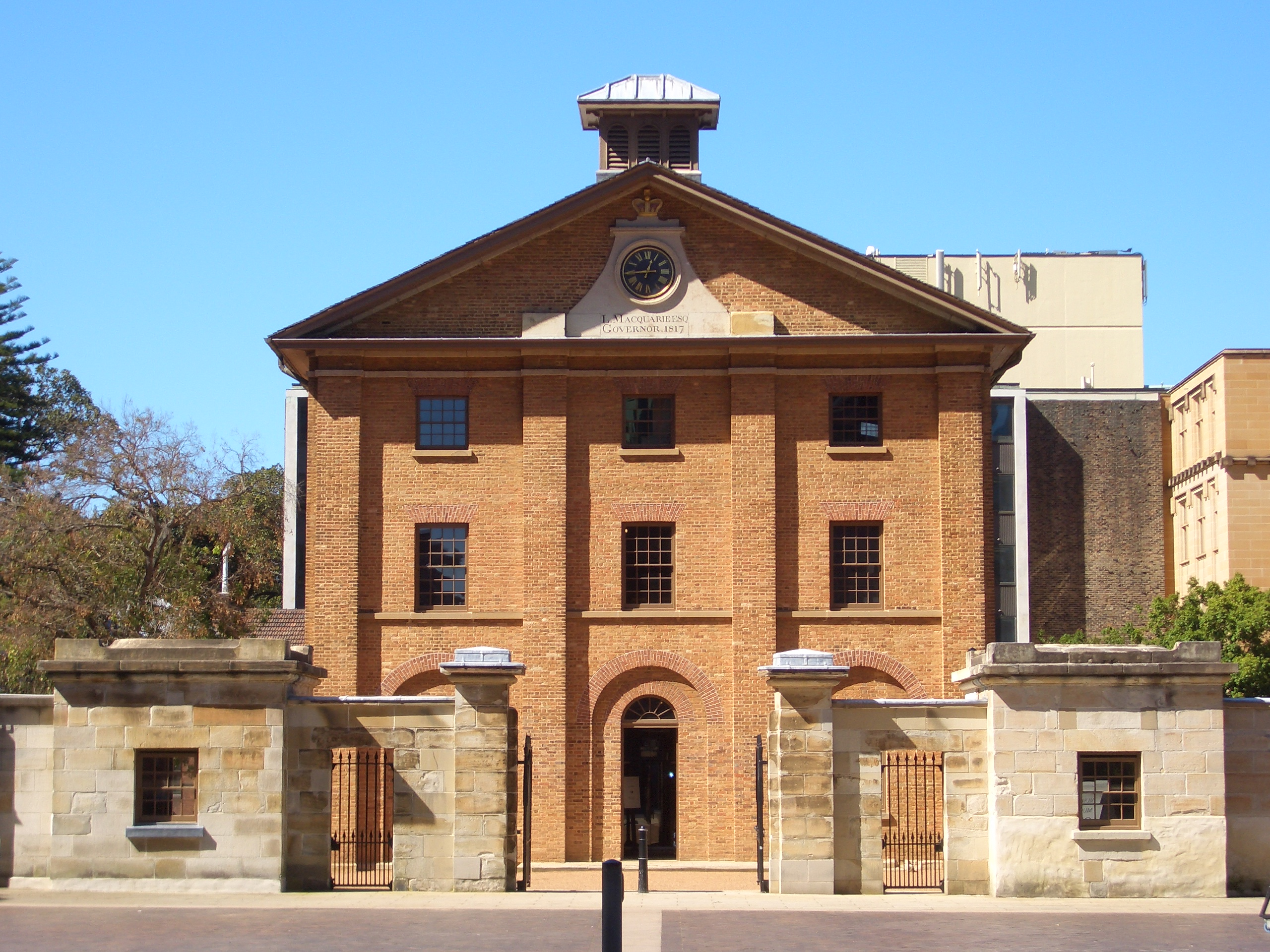
Hyde Park Barracks (completed 1819)

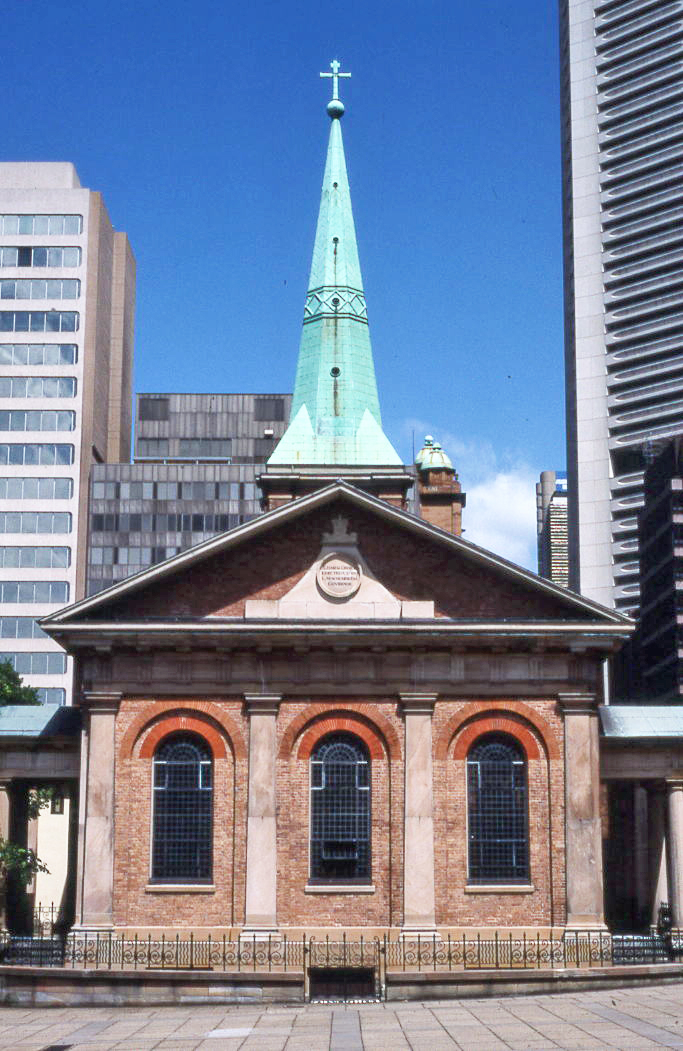
St James' Church (completed 1824)

Two buildings preserved from the Macquarie era, located at the southern end of Macquarie Street.

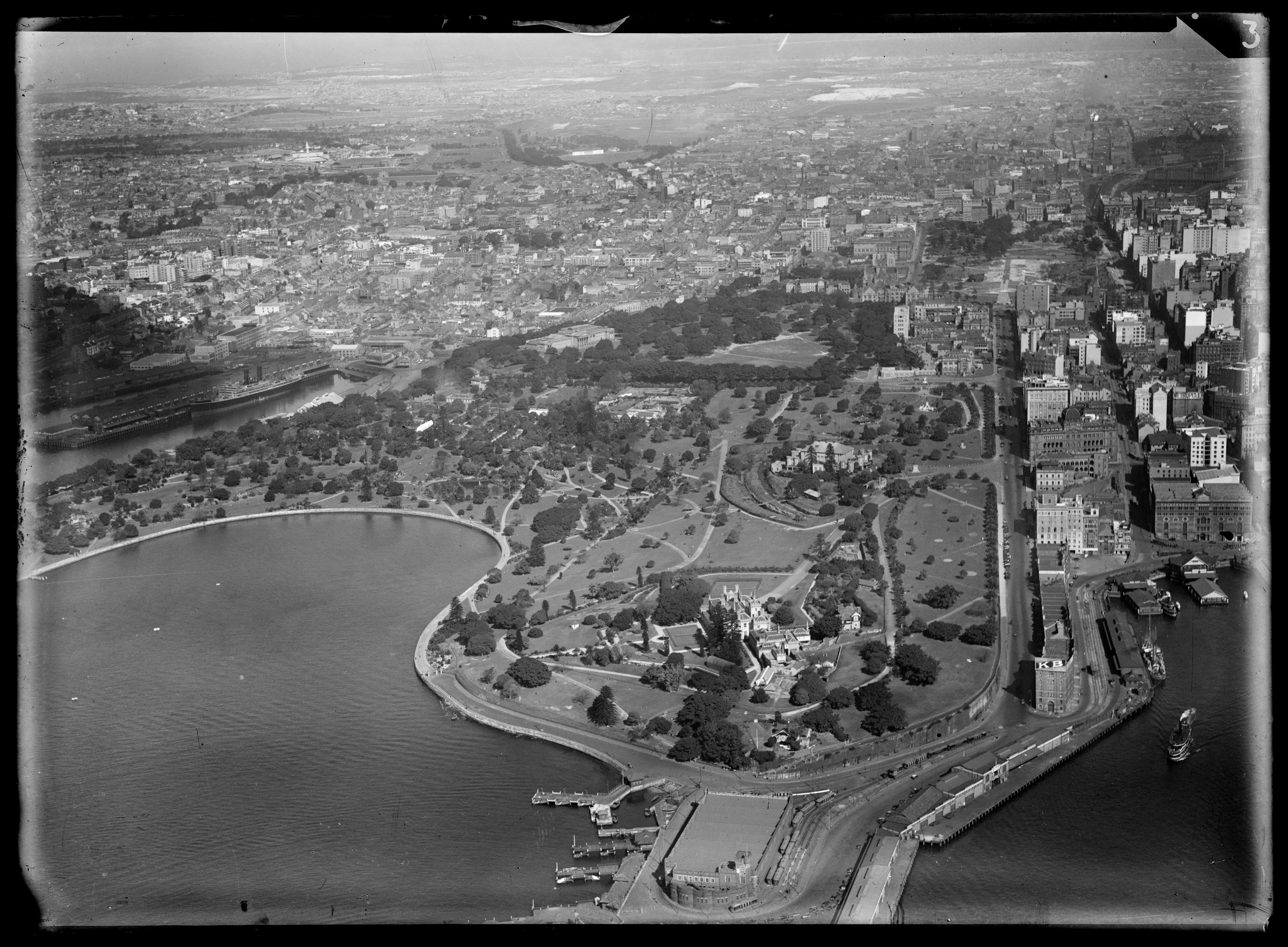
Aerial view of Macquarie Street, Botanical Gardens and Domain, Sydney, c. 1935

Macquarie Street is named after Lachlan Macquarie, an early Governor of New South Wales (in office 1810–1821). In the years since its founding in 1788, Sydney had developed organically, and by the early 1800s was lacking in major public buildings, and had a complex network of narrow streets. The supply of drinking water and waste management was also becoming an issue. Governor Macquarie initiated the construction of Sydney's first public buildings of any real permanence and set the boundaries of Sydney's grid of streets. With Circular Quay as the focus of this new civic scheme, Macquarie Street marked its eastern boundary and was designed as a ceremonial thoroughfare. The public buildings distributed either side of the street would both delineate and connect the civil and commercial town centre to its west with the green spaces (now the Domain and Royal Botanic Gardens) to the east.

Among the public buildings commissioned by Macquarie, Hyde Park Barracks and St James' Church are two examples largely preserved from that era. The two buildings face each other across Queen's Square, at the southern end of Macquarie Street.

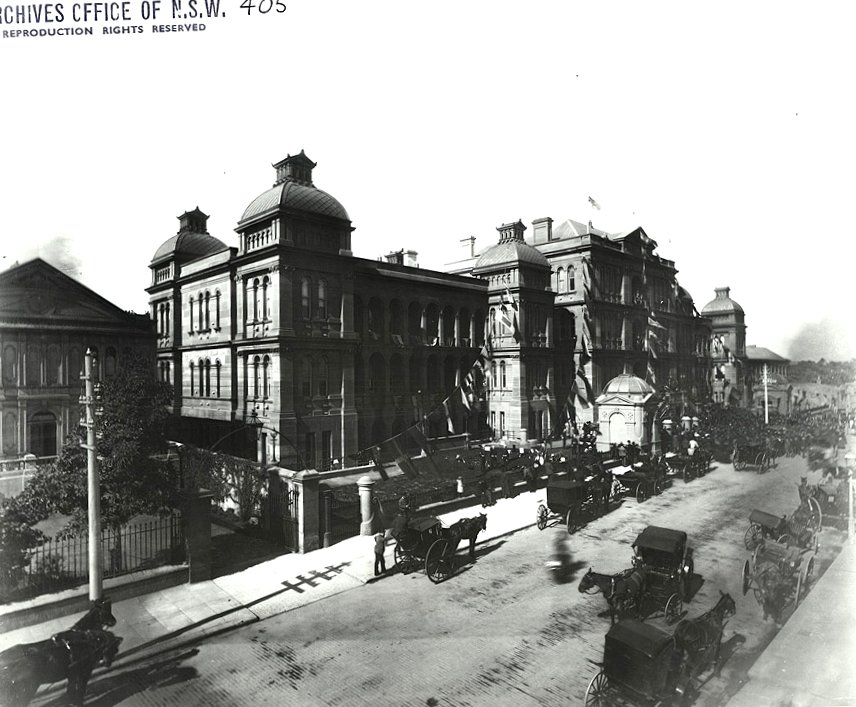
The Sydney Hospital, after rebuilding was completed in 1894

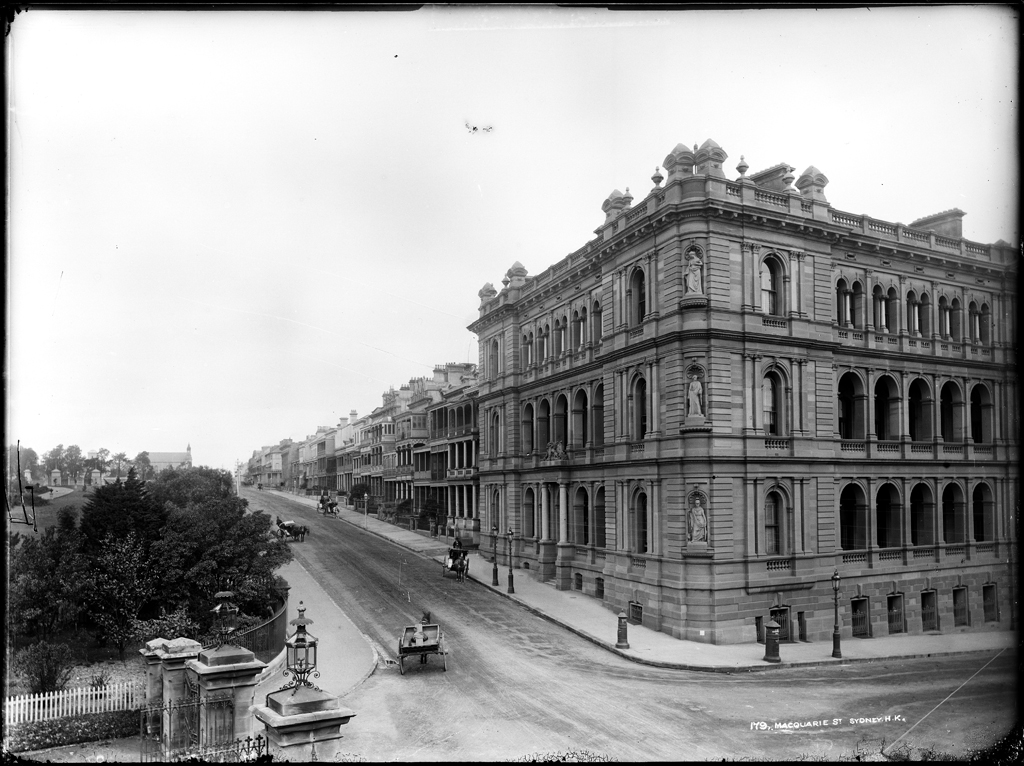
The central section of Macquarie Street c. 1900, looking south: the tall building on the right is the Colonial Secretary's Building, while on the left is the gate of the Royal Botanic Gardens leading to Government House and the Government House stables (now the Sydney Conservatorium of Music)

Upon laying out the street in 1810, Governor Macquarie also carved out land from the Domain for the building of Sydney Hospital, with its frontage on Macquarie Street. Due to the reluctance of the British government to provide funding, the building contract for the hospital provided for the government to provide convict labour, and for part of the project costs to be paid in the form of rum import monopolies, leading to the name the "Rum Hospital". The hospital buildings were completed in 1816. Although called "elegant and commodious" by some commentators, architect Francis Greenway criticised both the design and construction. As the only major hospital in the colony at the time, the hospital took up almost the entire eastern frontage of the southern half of Macquarie Street. However, the hospital's capacity exceeded the needs of Sydney at the time, and almost from the start space in its two wing buildings began to be occupied by various government institutions. The northern wing building was occupied by the Legislative Council and Executive Council, and was eventually expanded to become the Parliament House for New South Wales. The southern wing building became the Sydney Mint, among other functions.

After Macquarie, subsequent governors and (after the establishment of responsible government in the colony) governments continued to regard Macquarie Street as the axis of an informal governmental and public precinct. The State Library of New South Wales, the Colonial Secretary's Building and the old Treasury Building, (now part of the InterContinental Hotel) are examples of such institutions. At the same time, as an elegant tree-lined boulevarde adjacent both to the commercial city centre and the green spaces of the Royal Botanic Gardens and the Domain, the street became Sydney's most pre-eminent residential address. In particular, the close proximity to Sydney Hospital and court buildings attracted leading barristers and doctors to set up chambers and surgeries along the street. In 1977, the New South Wales government built a new Law Courts Building at Queen's Square at the southern end of the street, to house the Supreme Court of New South Wales and the Sydney registries of the Federal Court of Australia and the High Court of Australia.

Burdekin House, built in 1842 and described as the finest private residence in Sydney, was located on Macquarie Street. Its demolition became an early rallying point for the conservation movement in Sydney. St Stephen's Presbyterian Church was built in 1934 on the site of Burdekin House, after an earlier St Stephen's in Phillip Street was demolished for the creation of Martin Place.

The Garden Palace, a grand building constructed for the Sydney International Exhibition in 1879, was located on Macquarie Street, but was destroyed by fire only a few years later.

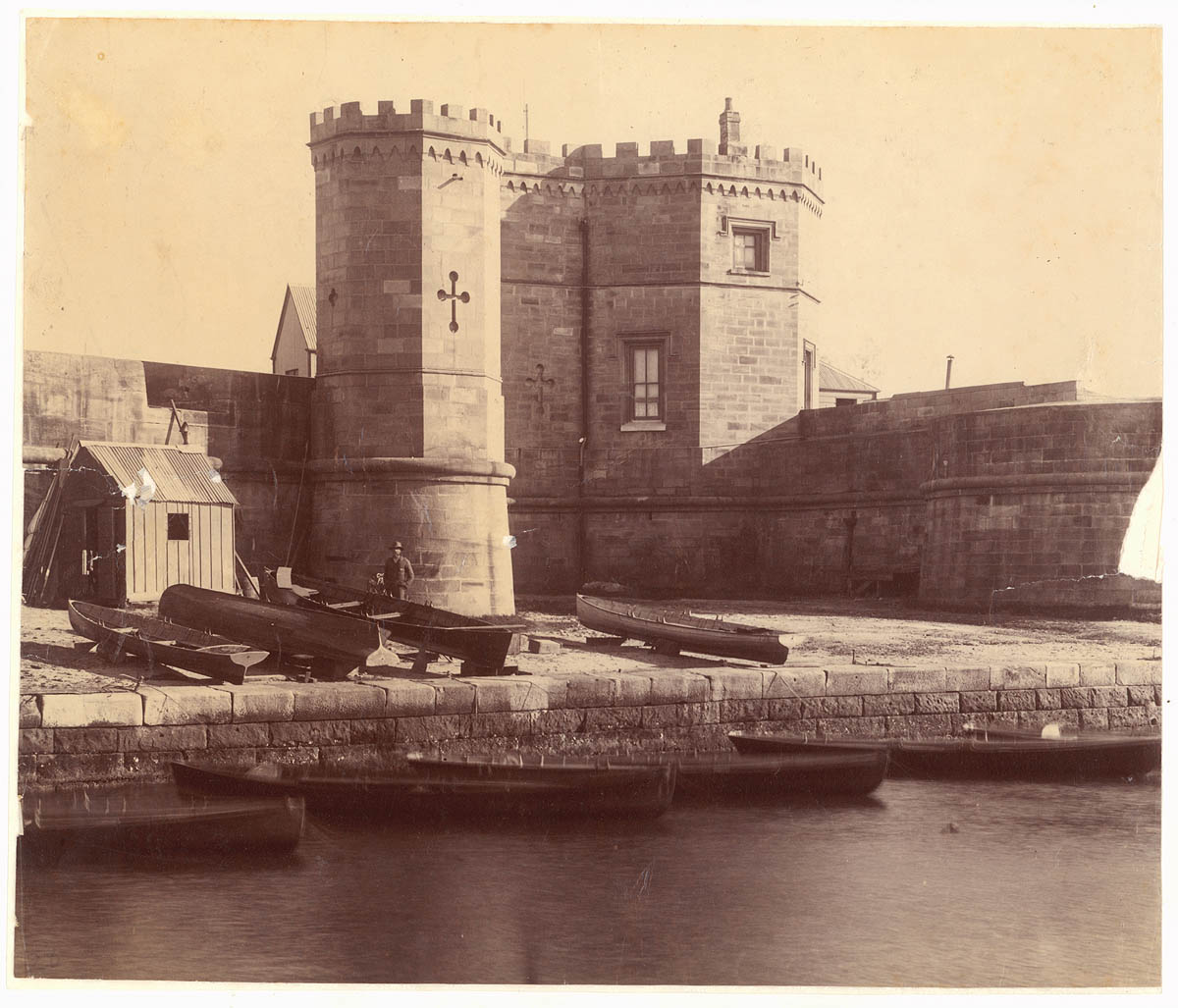
Fort Macquarie in 1870

The northern section of Macquarie Street was initially a path through the Governor's Domain leading to Bennelong Point. After Government House was moved further up the hill, the path was widened and became part of Macquarie Street, leading to land to the west of the street being sold off for commercial development in the 1840s–1850s. Today, this northern section of Macquarie Street runs along the eastern side of Circular Quay. To the east of this northern section is the Royal Botanic Gardens, while to the west of the street, the historic sandstone Moore Stairs, built in 1868 leads to the waterfront. In the past, this area was lined by warehouses and other shipping-related facilities focusing on the wool trade, leading to this section being called the "wool stores" end. In 1868 Moore Stairs were built to provide access between these stores down to East Circular Quay. At the end of the street was Bennelong Point. From 1821 this was the site of Fort Macquarie, which in 1901 was demolished to make way for the Fort Macquarie Tram Depot, which was eventually demolished in 1958 to make way for the Sydney Opera House.

The warehouses and wharf facilities near the Opera House were progressively removed in the mid-20th century and replaced by modernist office blocks. In 1998, the Bennelong Apartments, a complex of contemporary buildings nicknamed "the Toaster", replaced the modernist office blocks. The complex includes private apartments, retail outlets, restaurants, the Pullman Quay Grand Hotel and a cinema.

== "Harley Street of Sydney" ==
Because of the proliferation of medical chambers and surgeries, and the presence of a number of medical professional institutions, Macquarie Street was widely known as the Harley Street of Sydney from the late 19th century until recent decades. The Royal Australian College of Physicians Building at 145 Macquarie Street was the Georgian residence of John Fairfax until 1848. The British Medical Association's 1920s BMA House at 135–137 Macquarie Street still houses medical chambers and a lecture hall.

== Government and public buildings ==
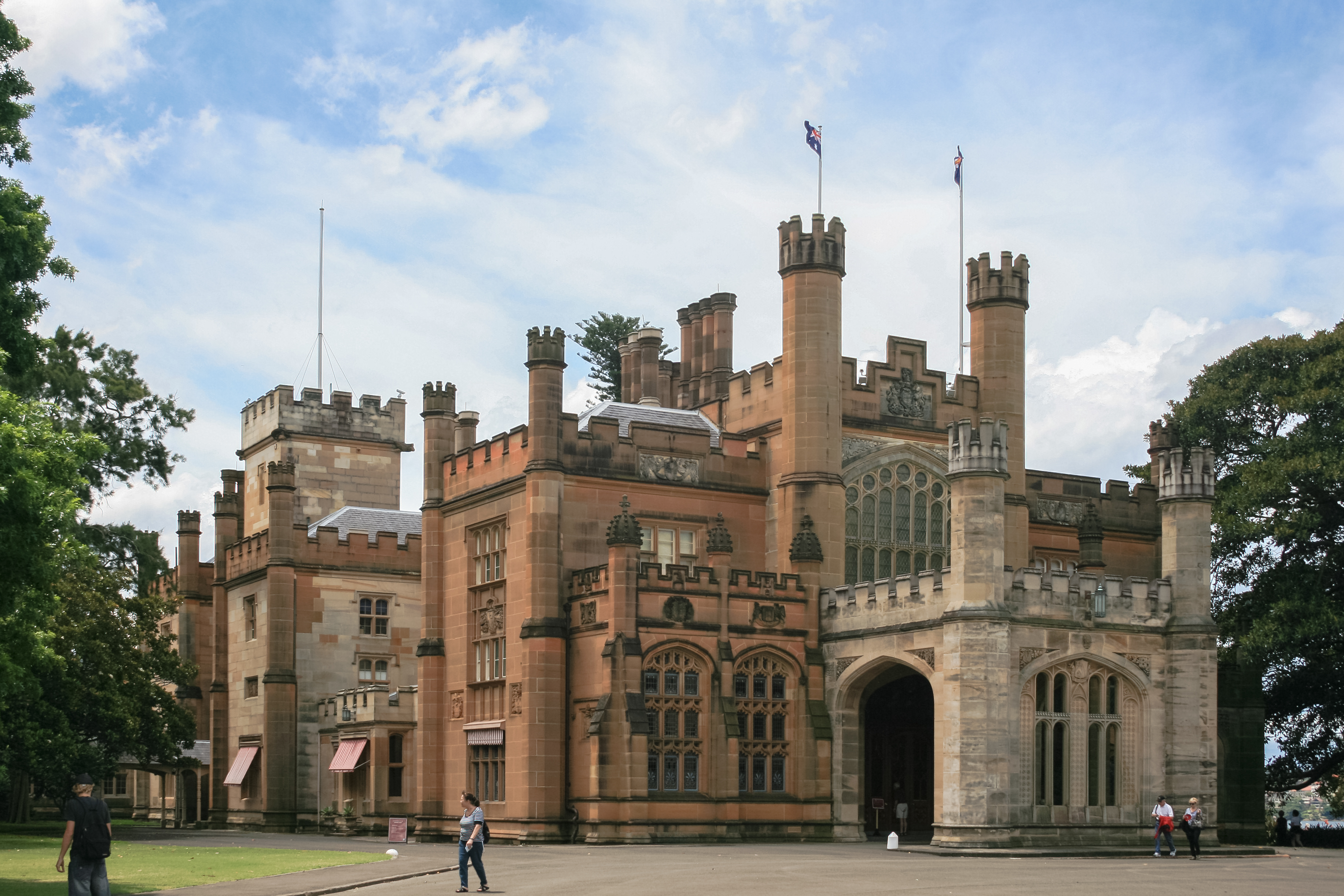
Government House, located within the Royal Botanic Gardens. Entry is from Macquarie Street.

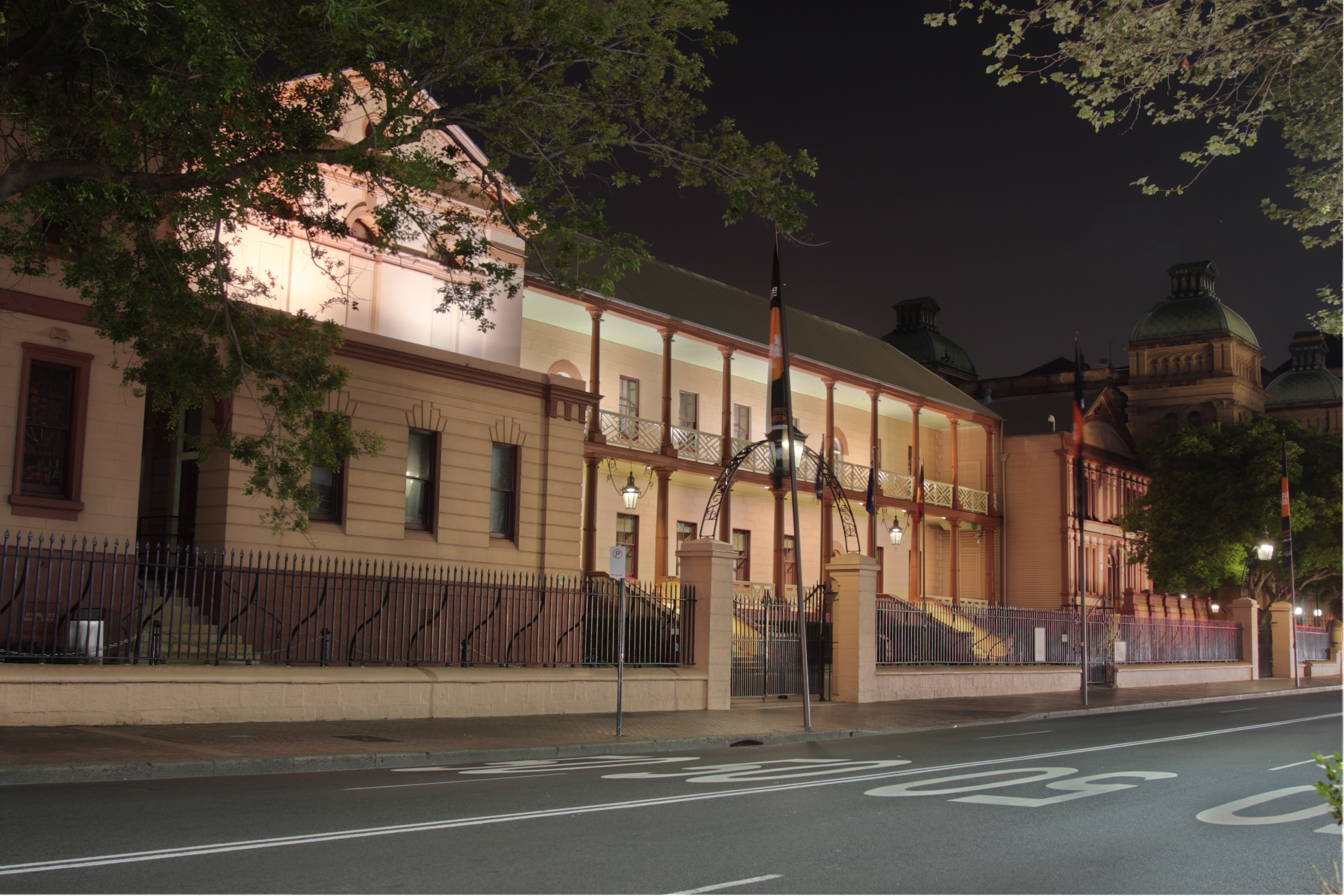
Parliament House, near the southern terminus of Macquarie Street

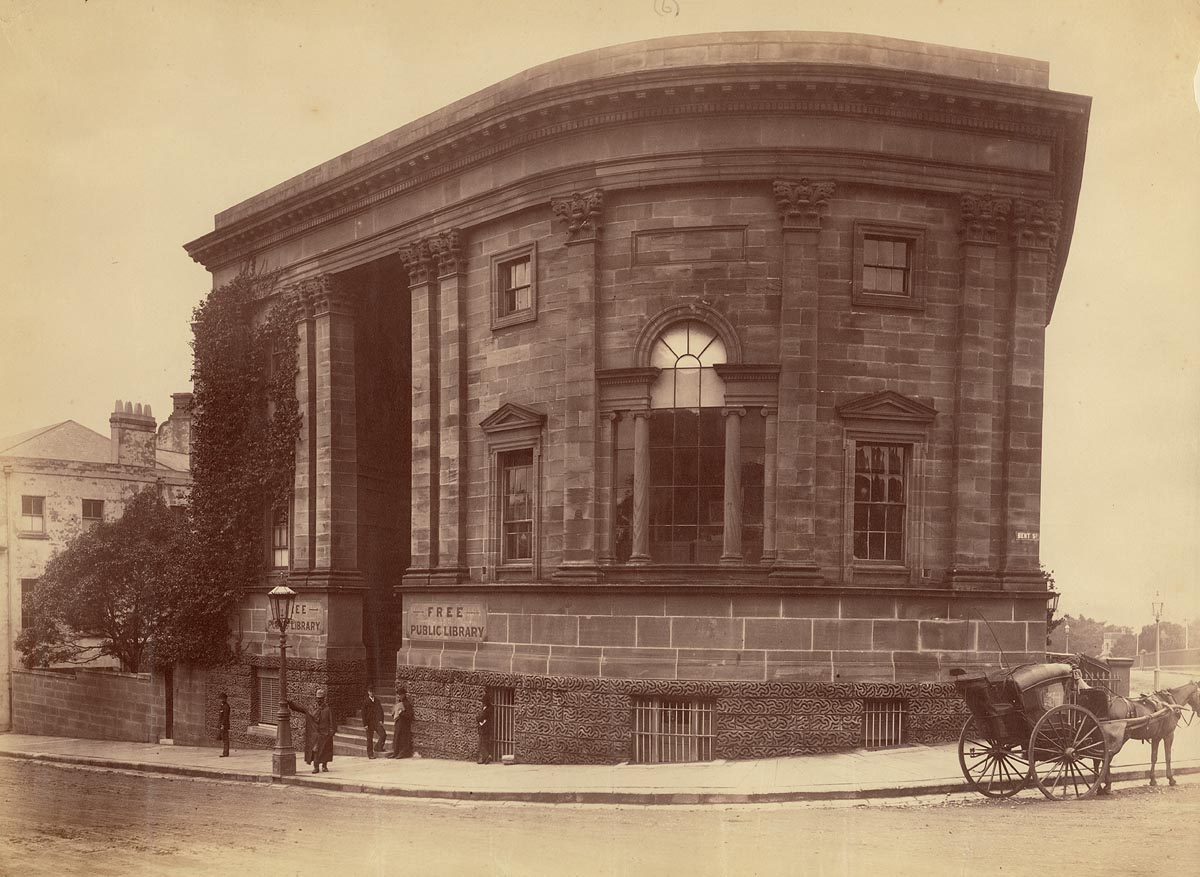
Sydney Public Library, corner of Bent and Macquarie, Sydney, 1877. This building was demolished in 1967 for the State Office Block, later demolished for Aurora Place in 2004.

Macquarie Street is the location of the main governmental institutions of New South Wales: Parliament House, Government House, and the Law Courts Building (which houses the Supreme Court of New South Wales) are all located along the street. "Macquarie Street" is used as a metonym for the New South Wales government (the way Whitehall, for example, is a metonym for the British government).

Institutions of the federal government located along the street include the Sydney registries of the Federal Court of Australia and High Court of Australia, both in the Law Courts Building at Queen's Square, and the headquarters of the Reserve Bank of Australia.

Macquarie Street is also the location of Sydney Hospital, the Hyde Park Barracks and St. James' Church, which were all built during Governor Macquarie's tenure. The historic Sydney Mint building, along with the entrance building to Parliament House, are preserved remnants of the original Sydney Hospital.

The State Library of New South Wales is located on Macquarie Street, as are the historic Chief Secretary's Building and the old New South Wales Treasury (now part of the InterContinental Hotel). Within the Royal Botanic Gardens are Government House and the Sydney Conservatorium of Music, originally built as the Government House stables. At the northern terminus of Macquarie Street is the iconic Sydney Opera House.

== Notable past residents ==
- 123–125 Macquarie Street (The Astor): Dame Eadith Walker DBE; David Wilson KC; Hugh D. McIntosh; Portia Geach; S. H. Ervin; Barry Humphries; Cecil Purser; Cate Blanchett and Andrew Upton; Mark Bouris
- 127 Macquarie Street: John Fairfax
- 147 Macquarie Street: Sir Herbert Maitland
- William Scott Fell

== Cross streets and transportation ==
The southern end of Macquarie Street terminates at the northern edge of Hyde Park, where it meets St James' Road and Prince Alfred Road at Queen's Square, Sydney, to which Phillip Street and King Street also join. Other streets that cross or terminate on Macquarie Street, from south to north, are Martin Place, Hunter Street, Bent Street, Bridge Street, Conservatorium Road and Albert Street. The Cahill Expressway crosses Macquarie Street partly as an overpass and partly as a tunnel. The northern end of Macquarie Street is a roundabout near the Sydney Opera House at Bennelong Point.

St James railway station and Martin Place railway station on the Sydney Trains metropolitan rail network are located immediately adjacent to Macquarie Street, while Circular Quay railway station is located nearby.

== Architectural gallery ==
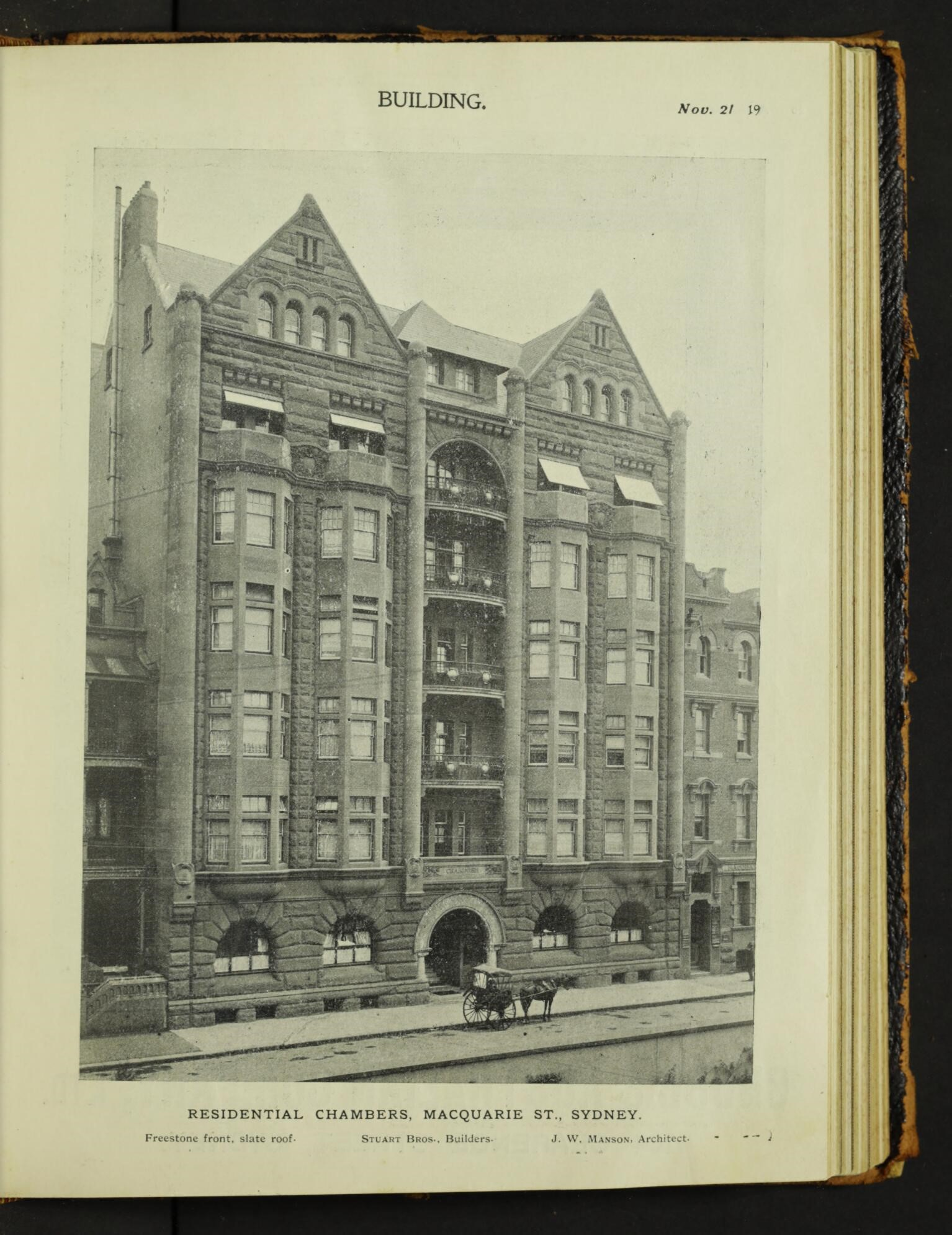
Residential chambers 131 Macquarie Street

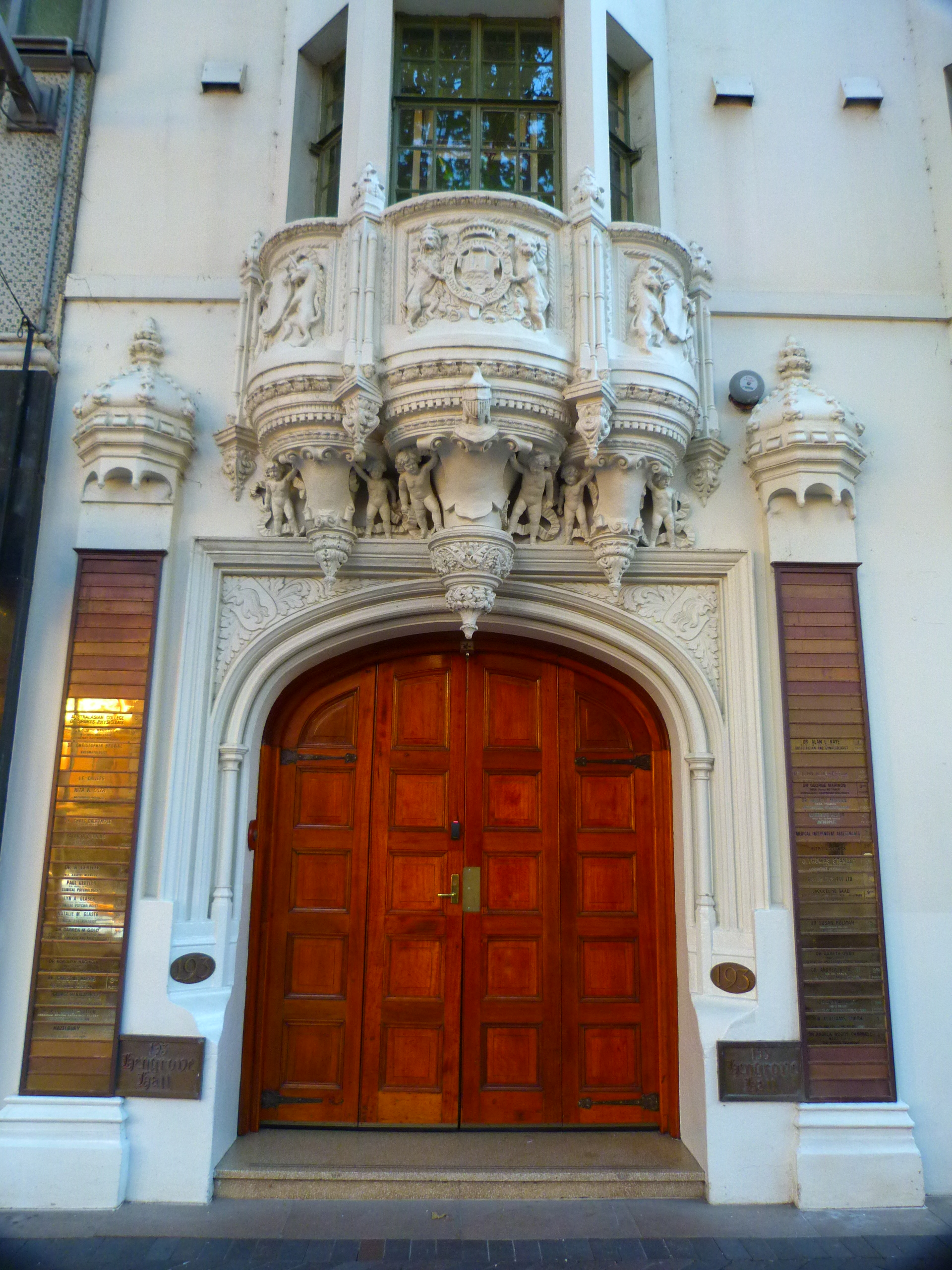
No. 193: Hengrove Hall (office building, mainly barristers' chambers and surgeries, completed 1928): façade detail

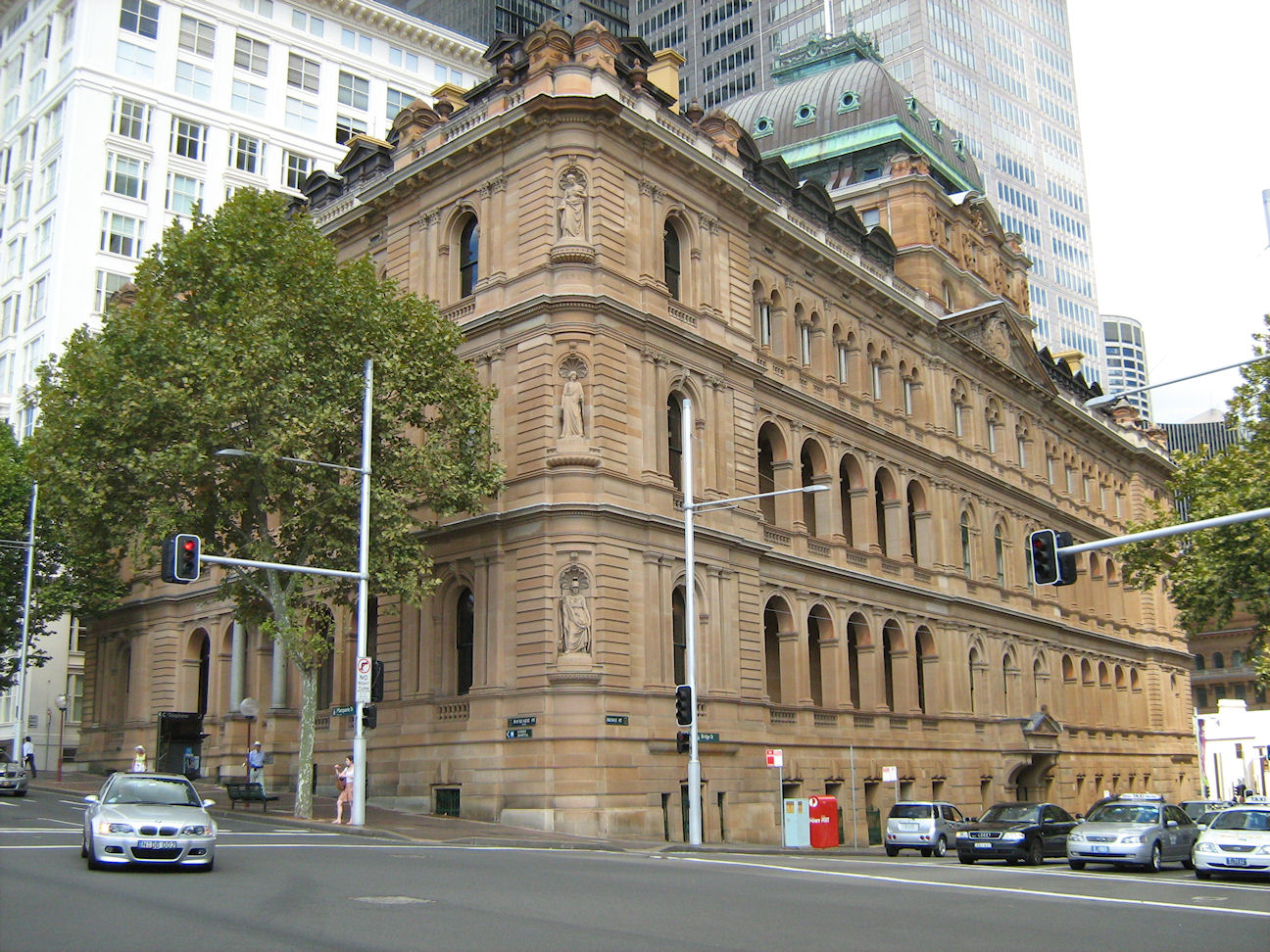
No. 121: Chief Secretary's building (completed 1881)

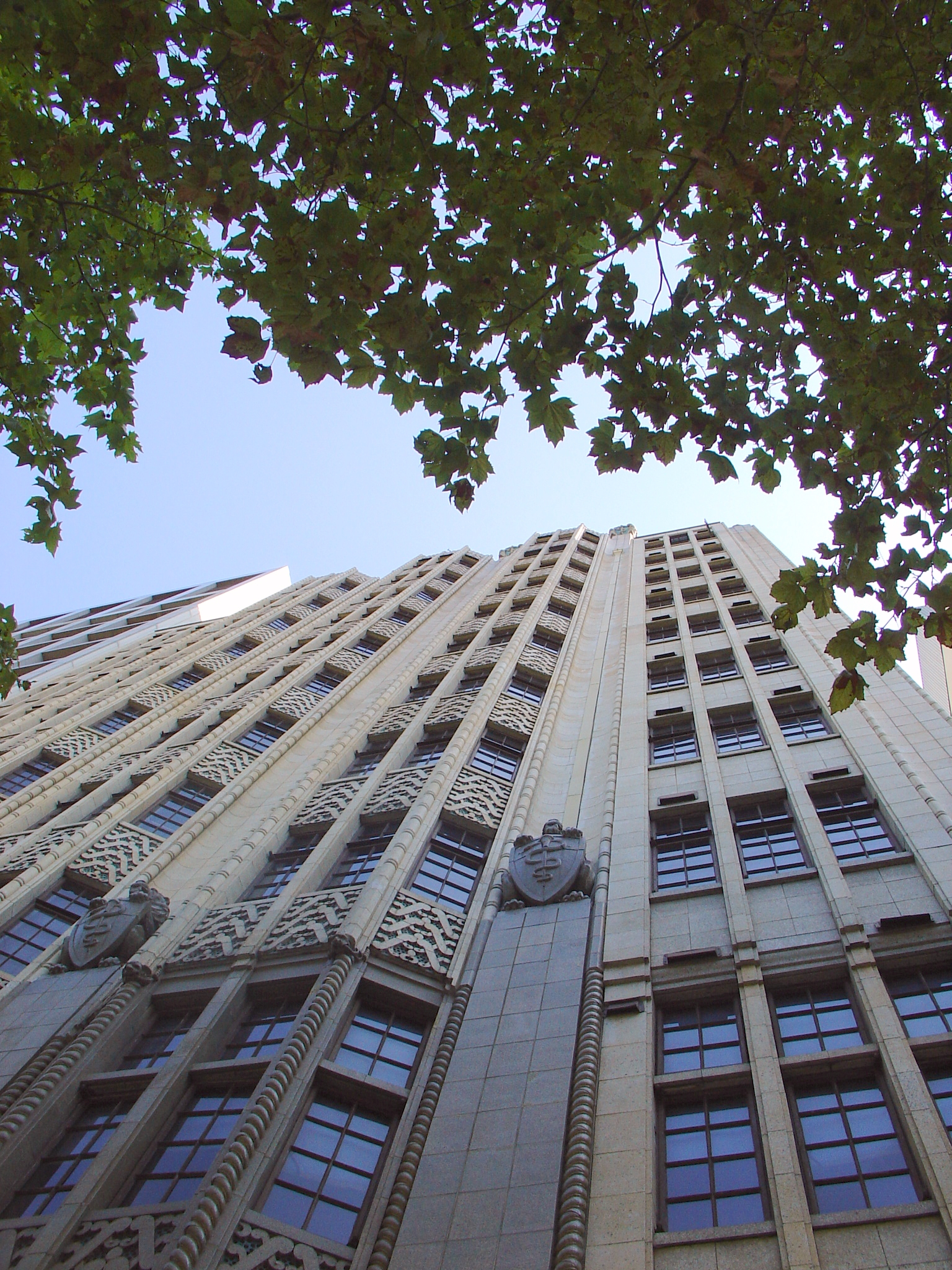
No. 135–137: British Medical Association building (completed 1930): façade detail

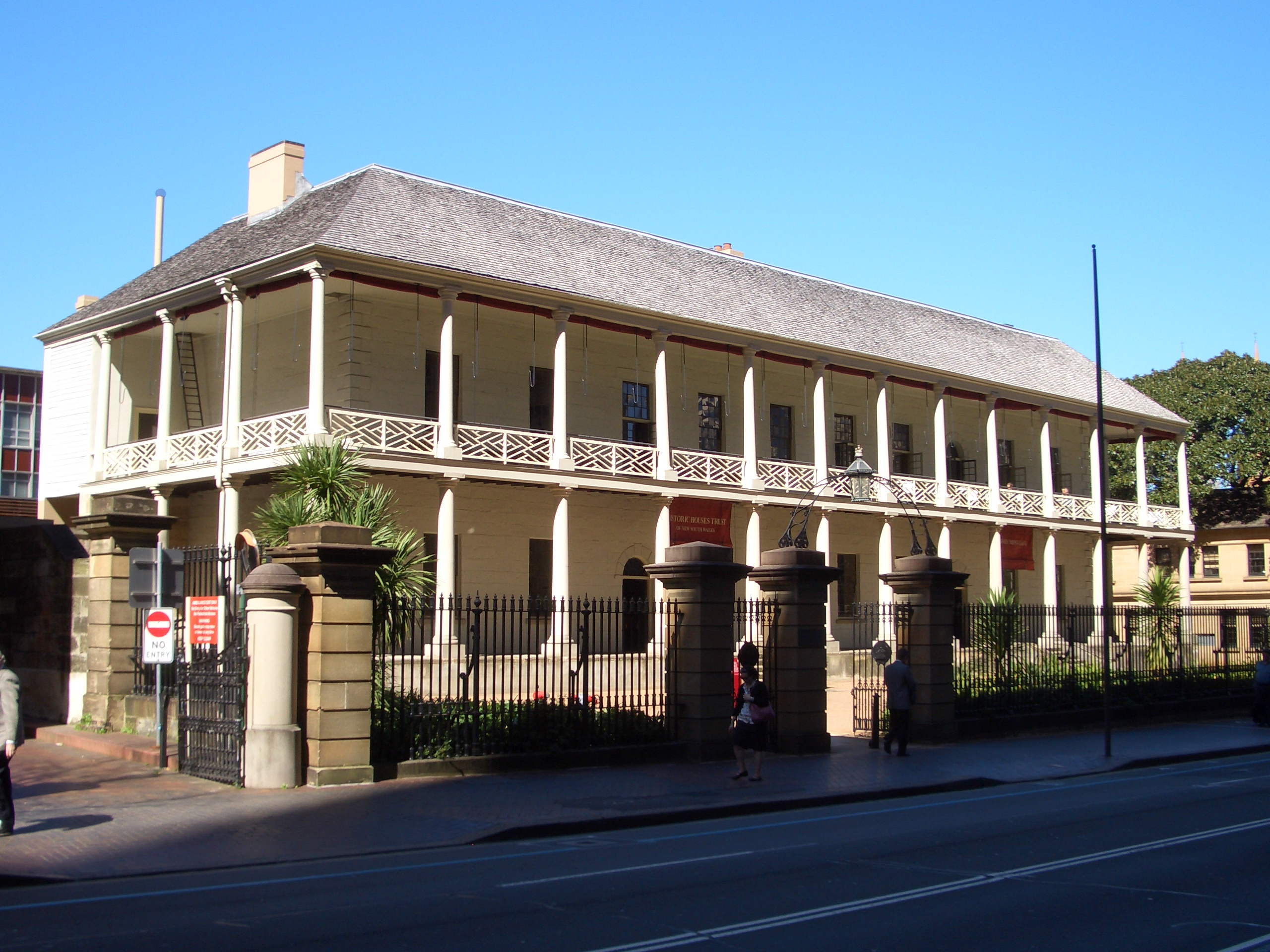
Sydney Mint building (completed 1816)

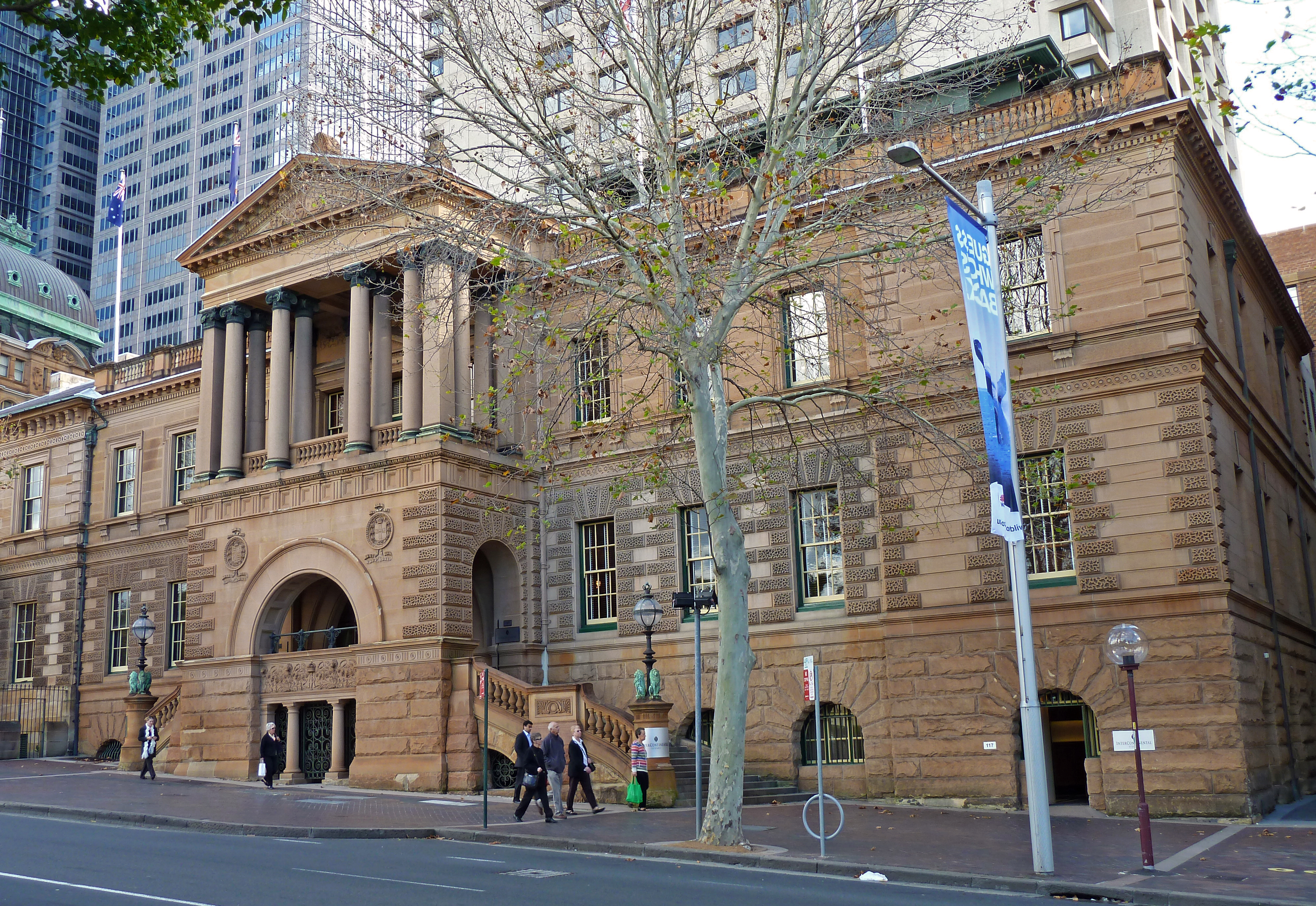
No. 117–119: old Treasury building (now part of InterContinental Hotel, completed 1899)

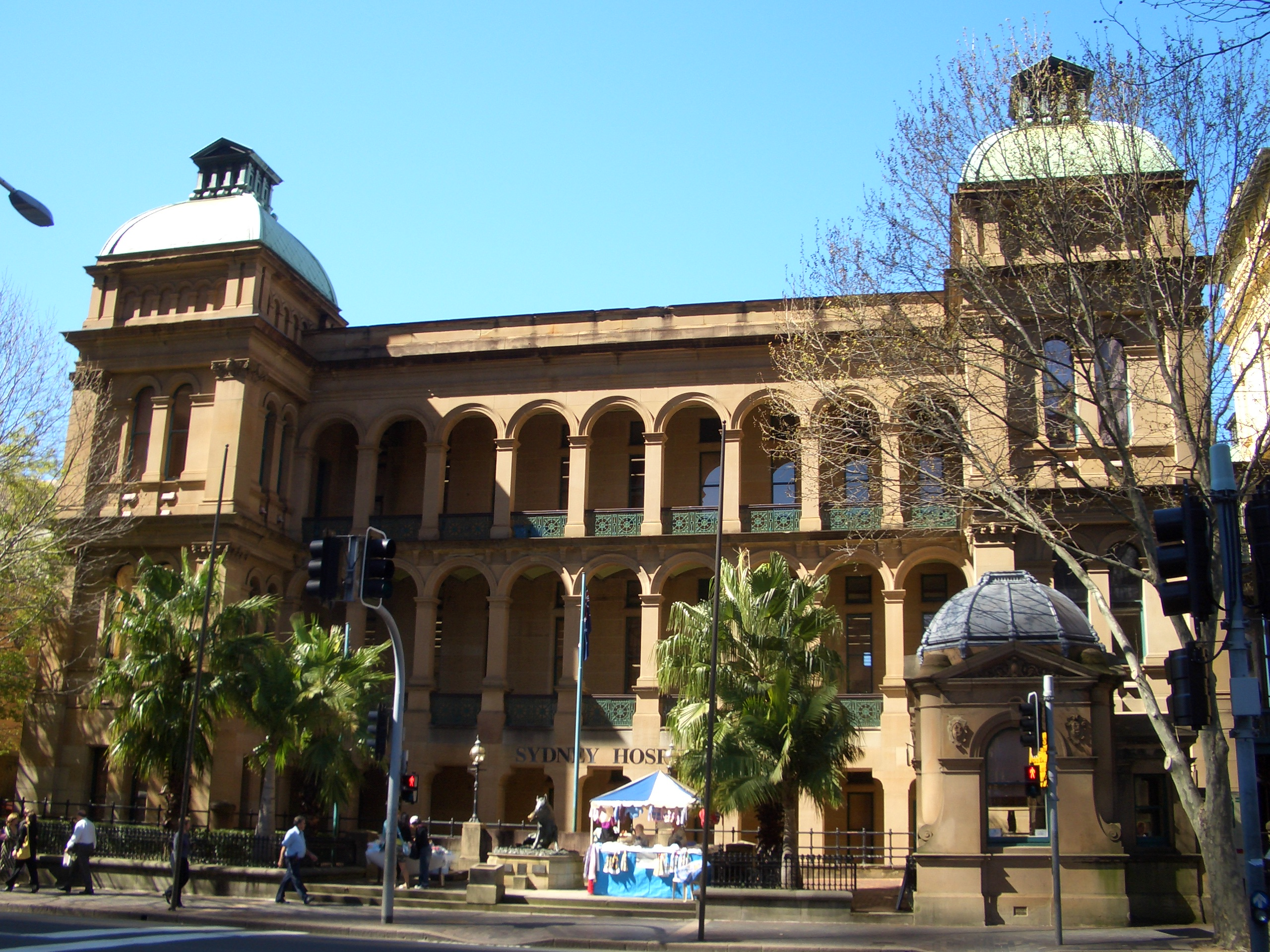
Near Martin Place: Sydney Hospital (side wing) (rebuilt 1894)

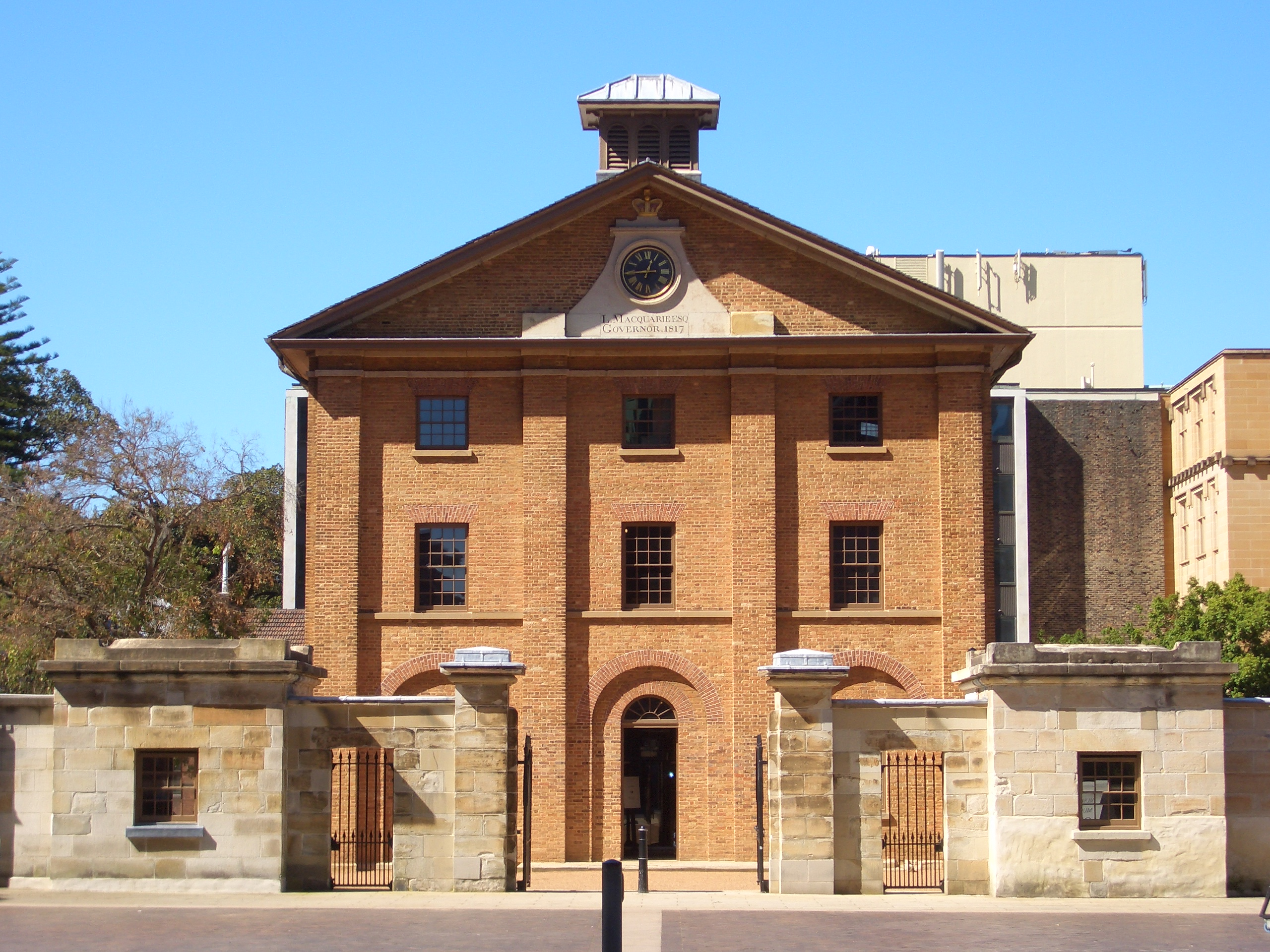
Queens Square / Macquarie Street: Hyde Park Barracks (completed 1819)

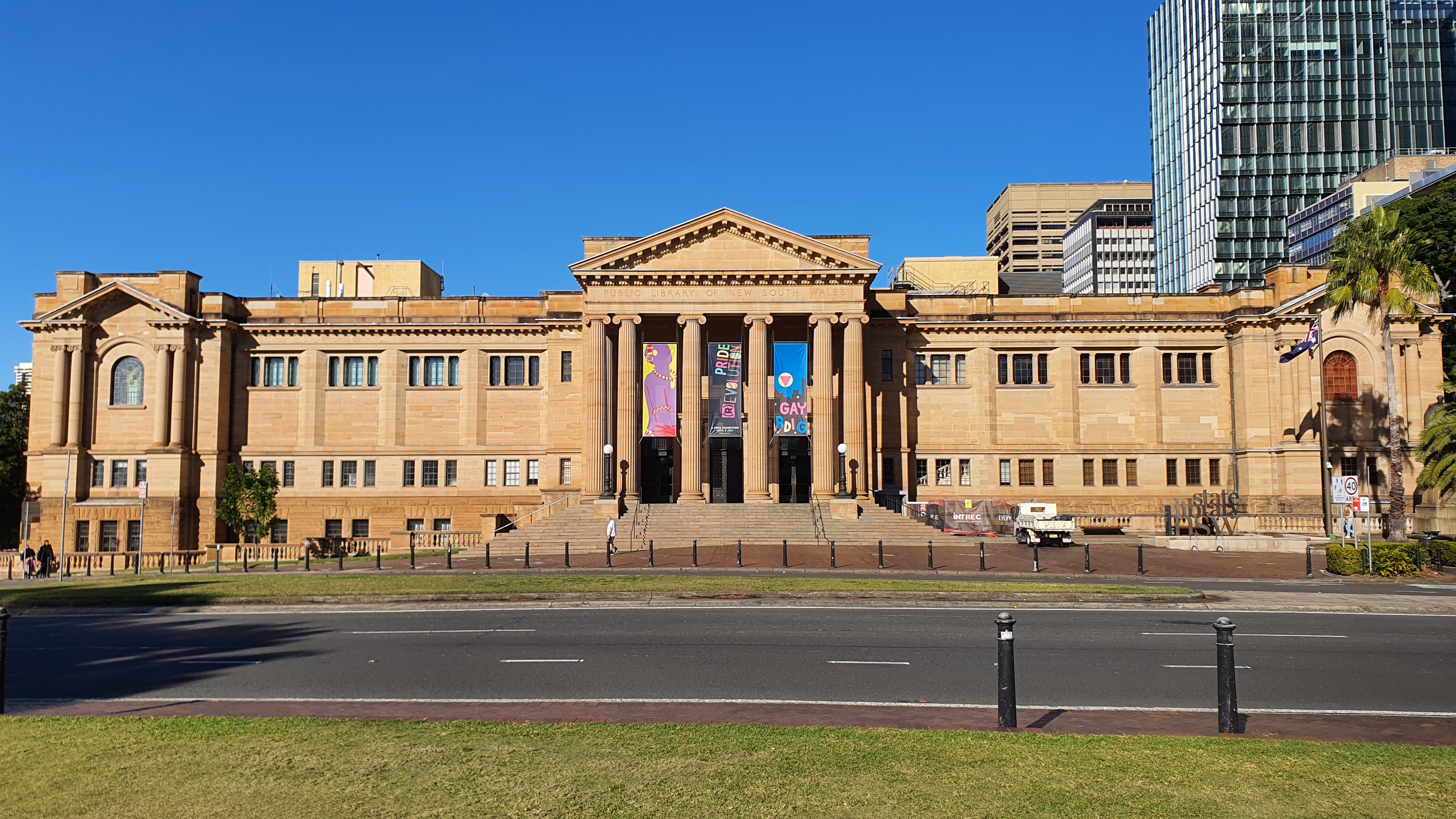
State Library of New South Wales (completed 1910)

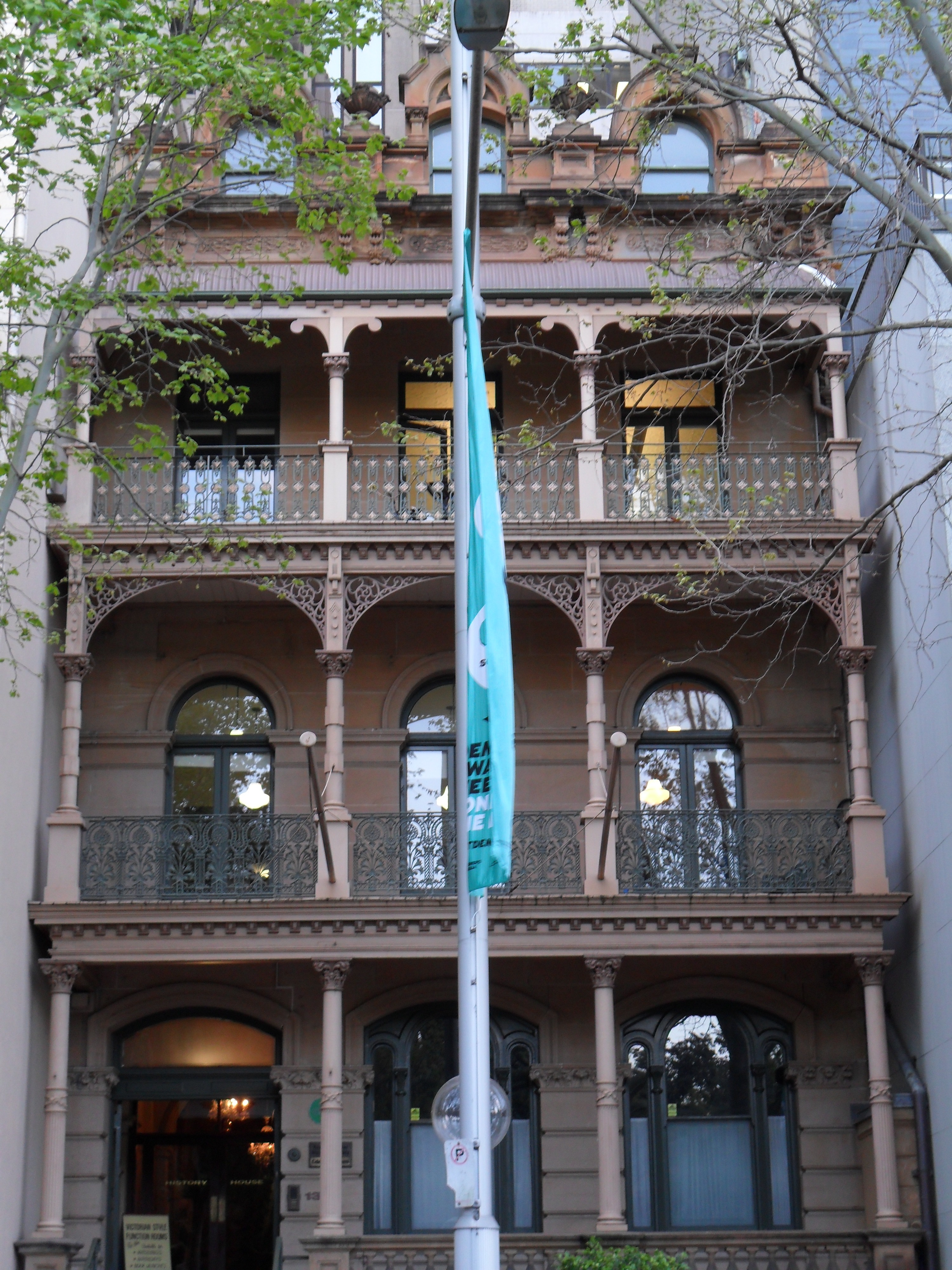
No. 133: History House, a surviving residential building used by the Royal Australian Historical Society (completed c. 1872)

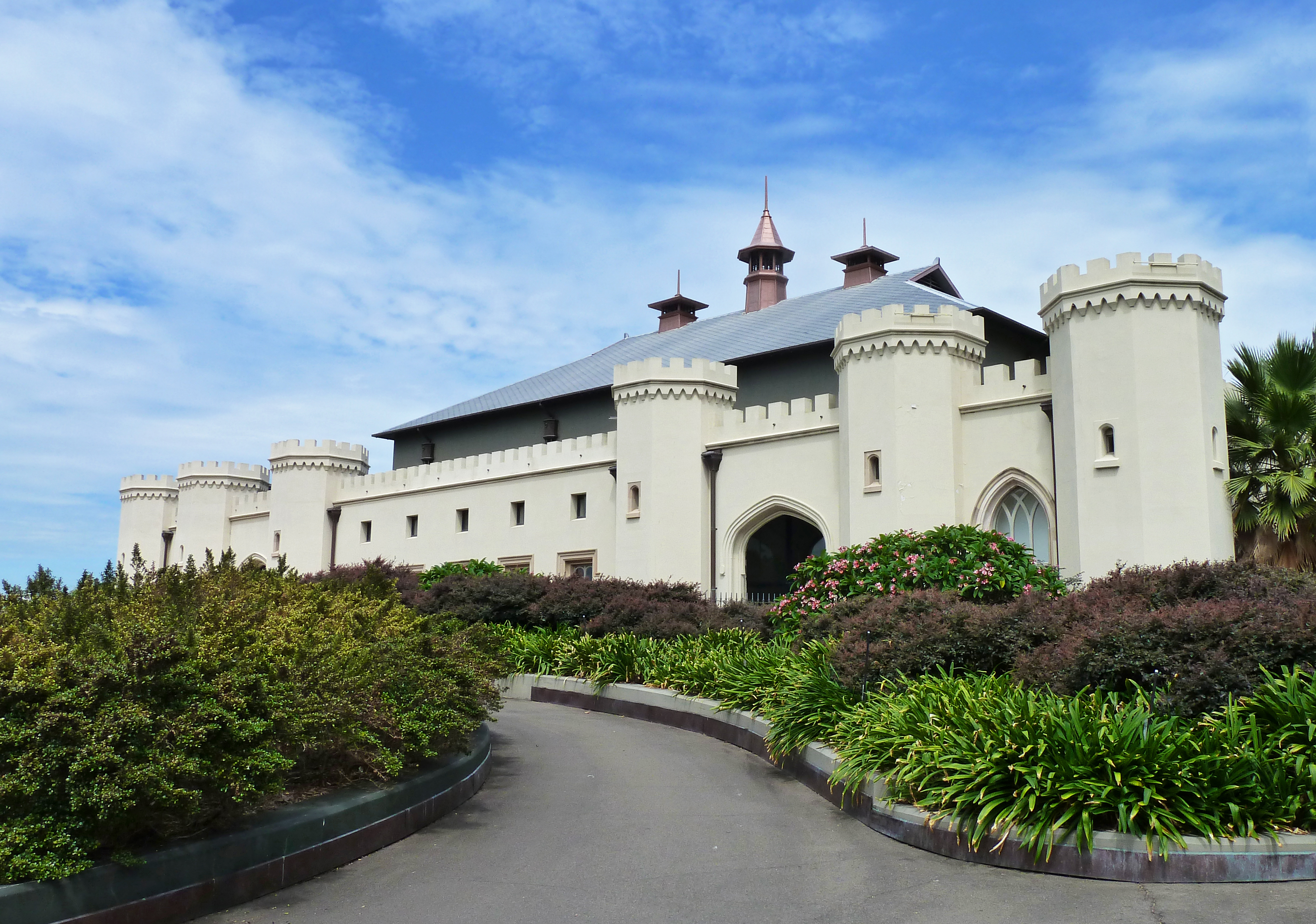
Near Bridge Street: Sydney Conservatorium of Music (built as Government House stables, completed 1815)

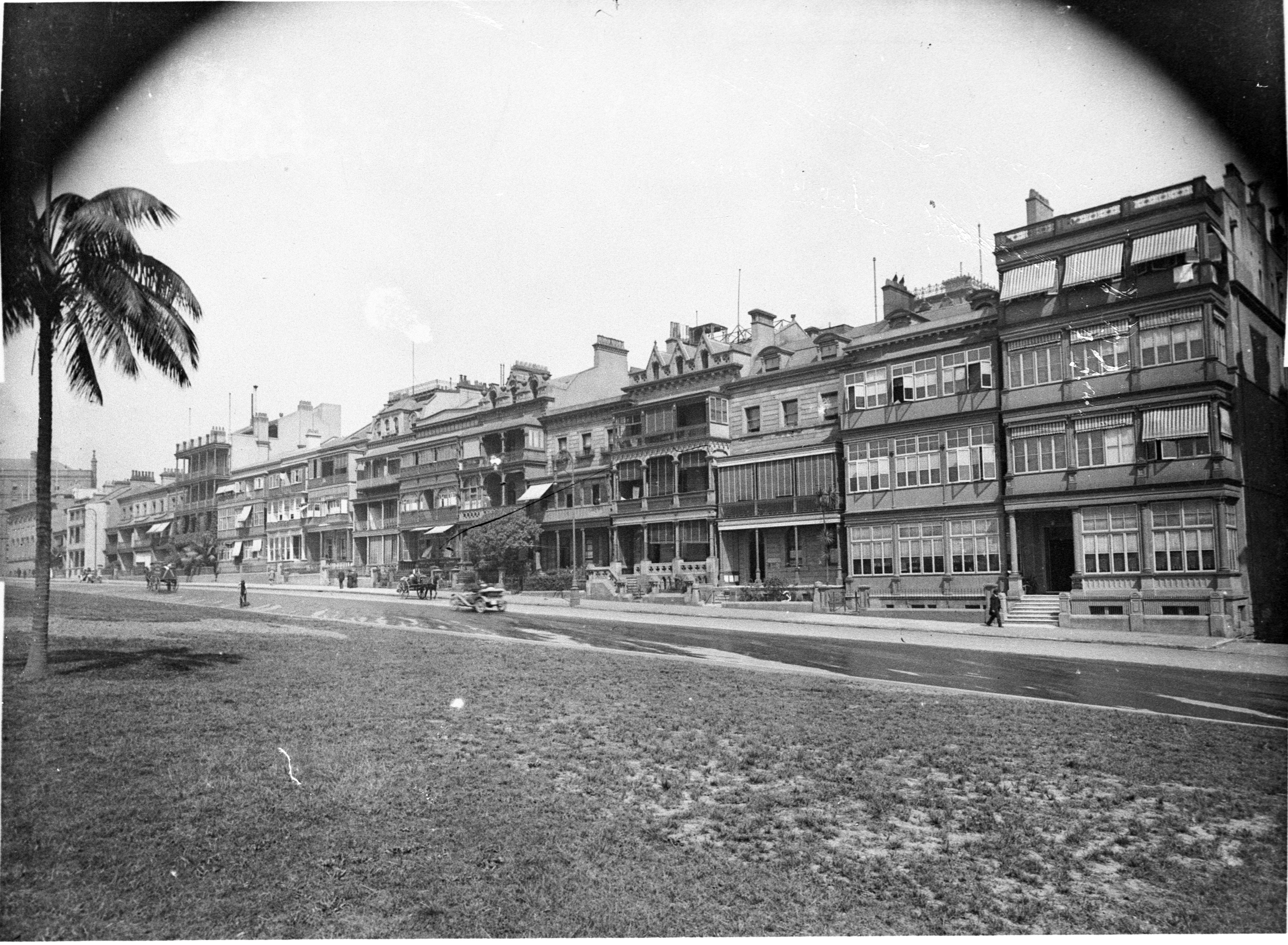
The houses on Macquarie Street, between Bent Street and Phillip Lane, Sydney 1910–1920

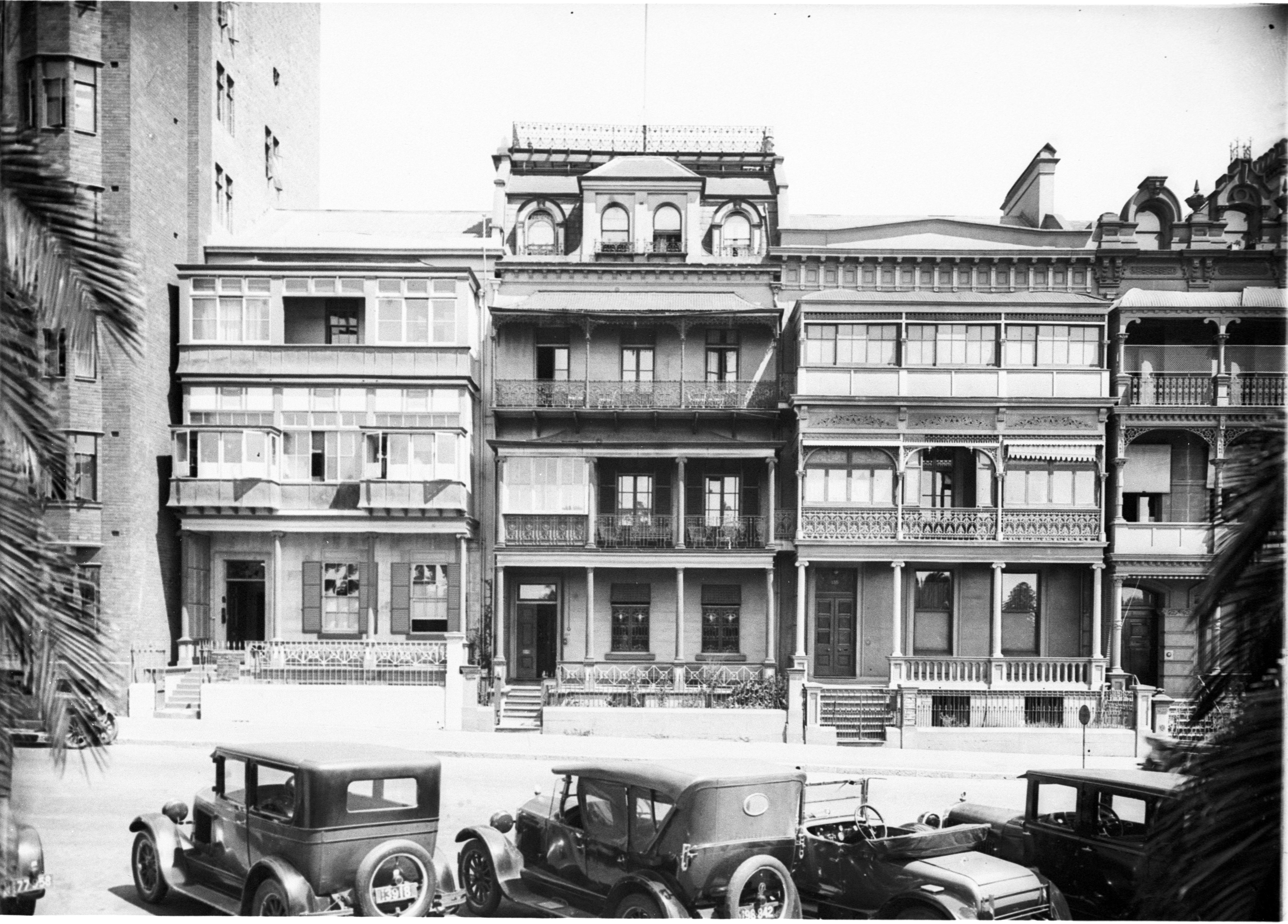
The houses at 133–139 Macquarie Street, Sydney c. 1925–1930
