= 181–187 Hay Street, Sydney =

181–187 Hay Street
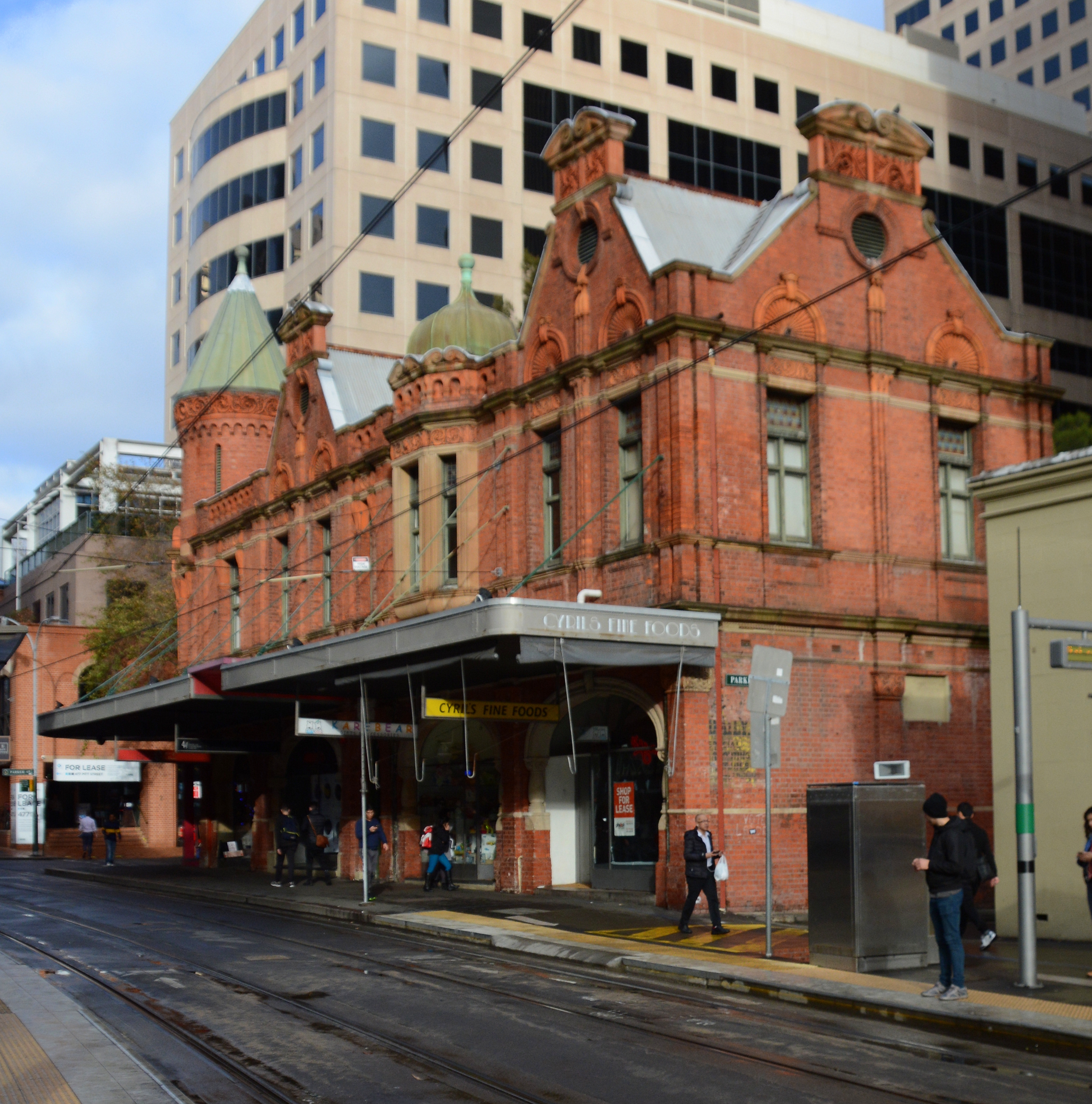
- 181–187 Hay Street, also known as the Corporation Building, in 2016

- Location within Sydney Location within Australia
- 33.8800°S 151.2058°E
- Location: 181–187 Hay Street, Sydney, Australia

History
- Built: 1893–1895

Site notes
- Architect: George McRae
- Architectural style: Federation Anglo-Dutch
- Owner: City of Sydney

New South Wales Heritage Register
- Official name: Municipal Building; Corporation Building
- Type: State heritage (built)
- Designated: 2 April 1999
- Reference no.: 693
- Type: Council Chambers
- Category: Government and Administration
- Builders: Daniel McInnes

181–187 Hay Street, also known as the Corporation Building or Municipal Building, is a heritage-listed former council chambers located at 181–187 Hay Street, in the Haymarket district of Sydney, Australia. It was built from 1893. The property is owned by City of Sydney and was added to the New South Wales State Heritage Register on 2 April 1999.

The building is home to the 4A Centre for Contemporary Asian Art.

== History ==
The "Eora people" was the name given by the British colonisers to the Aboriginal people who inhabited the area around Sydney around 1788. Central Sydney is therefore often referred to as "Eora country". Within the City of Sydney local government area, the traditional owners are the Cadigal and Wangal bands of the Eora. There is no written record of the name of the language spoken and currently there are debates as whether the coastal peoples spoke a separate language "Eora" or whether this was actually a dialect of the Dharug language. Remnant bushland in places like Blackwattle Bay retain elements of traditional plant, bird and animal life, including fish and rock oysters.

With British settlement of the Sydney region, the Gadigal and Wangal people were decimated, but there are descendants still living in Sydney today, and Aboriginal people from across the state have been attracted to suburbs such as Pyrmont, Balmain, Rozelle, Glebe, and Redfern since the 1930s. Changes in government legislation in the 1960s provided freedom of movement, enabling more Aboriginal people to choose to live in Sydney.

In 1892 it was proposed that "the old Corporation stores at the Haymarket is to be removed and give place to a building which will unite in character the markets adjacent." Primarily the new building was to provide "good lavatory accommodation" to cater for increased market activity in the area as well as some small retail outlets and offices. Indications of this combined use are still evident. The building is one of the very few remaining public toilets built in this period.

The contract for the construction of the new building, designed by George McRae, was let on 16 February 1893 to Daniel McInnes. This was around the same time that the construction of the Queen Victoria Building, also by McRae, was commenced. The New Corporation building was completed in 1895. In 1913 the adjacent Belmore markets were converted to the "Hippodrome" (later Capitol Theatre) and the original terracotta features were relocated to the first floor. During the 1920s as the market use ceased, shop fronts were inserted into the openings in the facade of 181-187 Hay Street and in 1935 the original awning was replaced with the present structure. The early awning was colonnaded with cast iron supports and was constructed under a separate contract in 1894. Following a fire in 1974, the roof covering was replaced with metal sheeting and since that time numerous alterations have taken place to the interior and exterior including the demolition of the central stairs and the removal of first floor partitions. The corner of the building under the tower has also been removed and new stairs and concrete floors have been inserted.

== Description ==
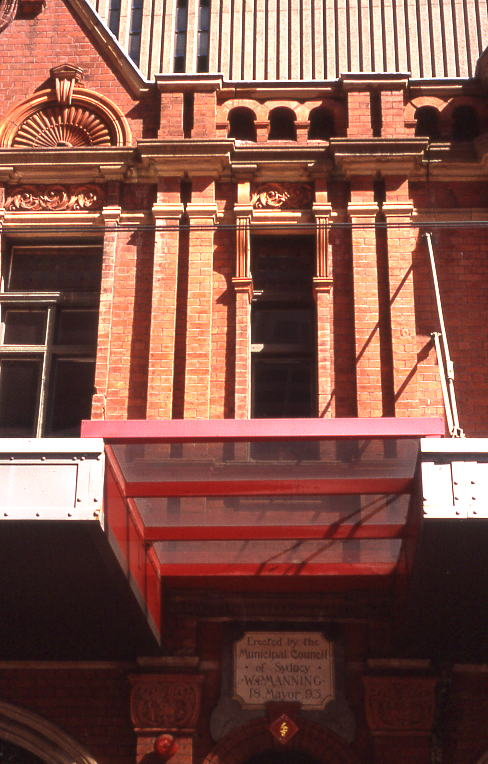
Detail, 2007

181–187 Hay Street is a rare example of Federation Anglo-Dutch style commercial architecture (pre-dating the Federation period by some years) with its intricate detailing and richly textured façade. Located in the Haymarket area of the City of Sydney, the building has its own distinctive architectural features using colourful terracotta, sandstone and red brick detailing and flamboyant forms and motifs.

he external detail is largely intact, with openings having been infilled from the 1920s onwards and an awning being replaced in 1935, but the interiors have undergone significant changes with only some elements surviving. The building occupies a corner site, fronting three streets, giving it a visual prominence in the area and the major corner is surmounted by a small round tower with conical roof. It forms a key part of the precinct with the Capitol Theatre and the Haymarket Chambers, which reflect Sydney's social and architectural heritage around the turn of the century.

=== Physical condition ===
The original building was predominantly loadbearing brick and timber construction, but various alterations have changed internal materials with the introduction of reinforced concrete floors, concrete stairs and the removal of dividing walls on the upper level. Internal features of significance include: timber-panelled encasement of the early roller shutter, internal detail of the skylight (now concealed), and original cast iron columns. The building appears to have been damaged by fire in the 1970s, which apparently affected the roof and internal finishes. Intrusive elements include a post-1970s fitout and other alterations.

=== Modifications and dates ===
- 1893–1895 – the building was used for market administration and public toilet by City Council;
- 2000 – the building was renovated and used as a Chinese community centre.

== Heritage listing ==
The Corporation building is within a recognised Heritage Streetscape. The building is of historic, aesthetic, and social significance as a rare surviving example of a small scale, flamboyant Federation Anglo-Dutch style building, characterised by intricate brick detailing and stylised design motifs. With the Haymarket Chambers, Capitol Theatre, and Palace Hotel, it forms a significant historic precinct of Victorian and Edwardian buildings of consistent character and scale, reflecting the period's growth and prosperity in relation to the markets, the railway terminus, and nearby large scale retail centres such as Anthony Hordern and Company. With the Capitol Theatre, the Corporation Building is a surviving element of the Belmore Market Precinct and a very fine example of market architecture from the late Victorian period.

The building is an early and important work of the City Architect, George McRae, who designed a number of buildings throughout the city including the Queen Victoria Building.

181–187 Hay Street was listed on the New South Wales State Heritage Register on 2 April 1999.

== Tenants ==
The Corporation Building has been the home of the 4A Centre for Contemporary Asian Art since 2000.

== See also ==
- Australian non-residential architectural styles
