= Department of Education Building =

Heritage-listed government building in Sydney, Australia

Department of Education building
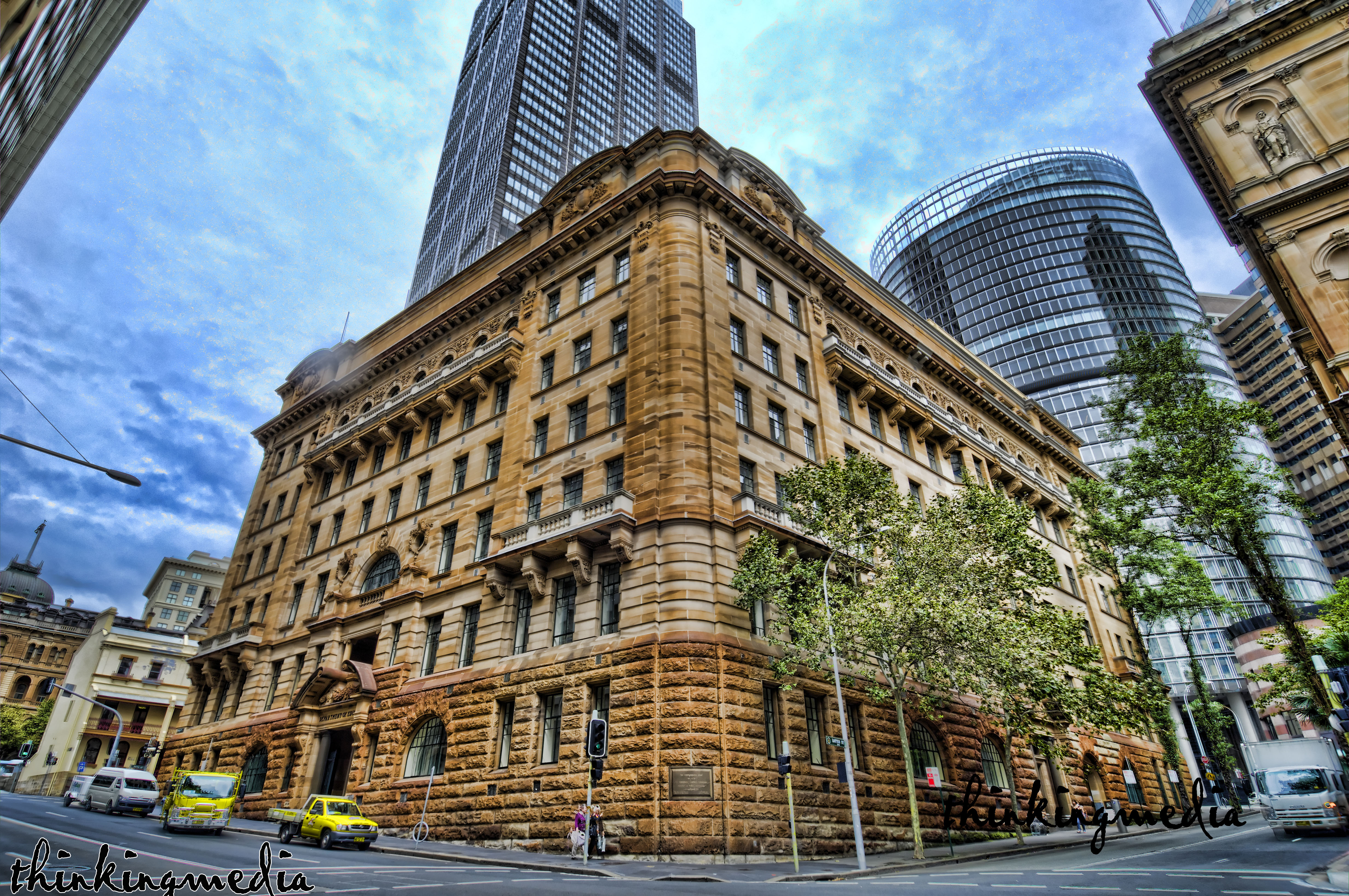
- The building as viewed from the corner of Loftus and Bridge Street

- Location within Sydney

General information
- Type: Government administration
- Architectural style: Edwardian Baroque
- Location: 35–39 Bridge Street, Sydney central business district, City of Sydney, New South Wales, Australia
- Coordinates: 33°51′50″S 151°12′38″E
- Current tenants: Pontiac Land Group
- Estimated completion: 1938
- Relocated: 1989
- Renovated: 1996
- Owner: Government of New South Wales

Technical details
- Structural system: Reinforced concrete slabs
- Material: Sydney sandstone

Design and construction
- Architects: George McRae (1912–1914); John Reid and Son (1928–1938)
- Architecture firm: Colonial Architect of New South Wales
- Developer: Government of New South Wales

New South Wales Heritage Register
- Official name: Department of Education Building; Education Building
- Type: State heritage (built)
- Criteria: b., c., d., e.
- Designated: 2 April 1999
- Reference no.: 726
- Type: Office building
- Category: Government and Administration

The Department of Education building is a heritage-listed state government administrative building of the Edwardian Baroque architectural style located in Bridge Street in the Sydney central business district in the City of Sydney local government area of New South Wales, Australia. The large public building was designed by Colonial Architect George McRae and built in two stages, the first completed in 1912, with John Reid and Son completing the second stage in 1938. It is also known as the Department of Education Building and the Education Building. The property was added to the New South Wales State Heritage Register on 2 April 1999.

The building has been occupied by the Department of Education since its establishment, previously known as the Department of Public Instruction, and has a long association with the public life of New South Wales. Various portions of the building, previously occupied by Department of Agriculture, were subsumed by the Education Department in 1978 when the Department of Agriculture relocated to another city location. The NSW Department of Education moved out in 2018 and as of 2019 the building is being redeveloped by Singapore developer Pontiac Land Group, together with the nearby Department of Lands building, to become a luxury hotel, currently marketed as "the sandstone precinct".

== Location ==
The building occupies an entire city block, bounded by Bridge, Loftus, Bent and Young Streets and Farrer Place in the Sydney central business district. Its four detailed sandstone façades were designed to dominate the precinct. The site is the longest official seat of the head office of the New South Wales government education administration. It has been occupied since September 1912, even though the department vacated the Bridge Street building late 1989 and returned in April 1996.

== History ==
In 1810, Governor Lachlan Macquarie arrived in Australia. During his leadership he required the assistance of his Secretary John Thomas Campbell who he worked with consistently until 1813. On 24 December 1813, Governor Macquarie approved the plans of building a house and offices for Secretary Campbell designed by architect Daniel Dering Matthew. Campbell moved into the site in 1816 which offered him accommodation, clerical rooms and storage space for record functions of government. This move marked a growing maturity of governmental and administrative duties which for many decades, this building was the real nerve centre of the Colony's administration. Almost all enquiries of government, particularly written ones went to the Colonial Secretary's Office serving as a clearing house and the hub of the administrative functions of the State.

In 1875, the Colonial Secretarial Office moved into a new location and was taken over by the Department of Public Instruction in 1881. A variety of minor additions and repairs were made to the building however, it was too small and cramped for the offices of the Department of Public Instruction. Under this surrounding of government buildings, the construction of the Department of Education building was initiated in two stages: Firstly, George McRae started the construction of the northern half of the Department of Public Instruction, now the Department of Education building using the Edwardian Baroque design. In 1901 when the Royal Australian Historical Society was founded met in a number of different venues and was eventually provided with rooms in the Department of Education building in Bridge Street. McRae, who was named a City Architect in 1887 and later became government architect, had already worked finalising the Sydney Town Hall. McRae also added to his curriculum two Sydney monumental buildings: the Romanesque style of the Queen Victoria Building façade (c. 1898) and the Edwardian Baroque style (also known as Federation Freestyle or Neo Baroque) of Central railway station (c. 1924). McRae latter style is characterised by sandstone structures that looked back to the 17th- and early 18th-century which developed the classical architecture of the Renaissance towards greater extravagance and drama. Its innovations included greater freedom from the conventions of the orders, much interplay of concave and convex forms, and a preference for the single visual sweep. This style was highly in vogue in Britain for government buildings at the time.

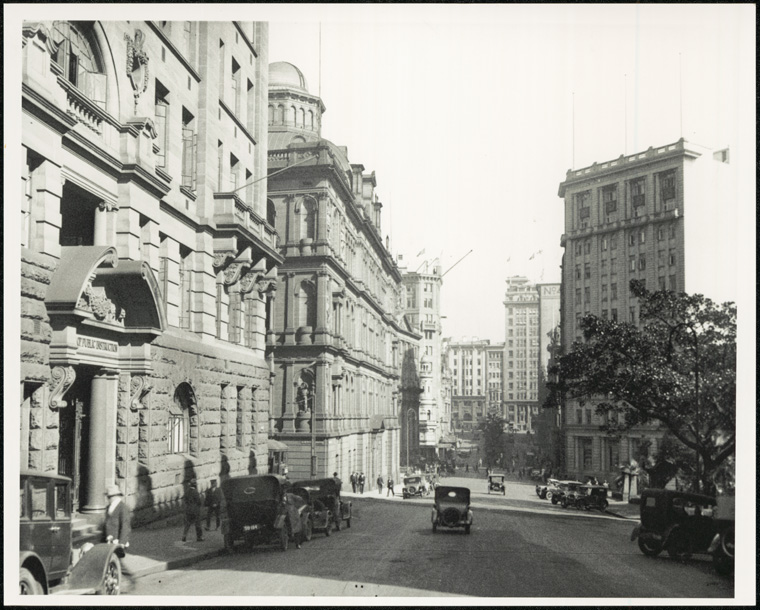
View down Bridge Street in 1920, with the Department of Education building visible on the left

To house the officers of the department a new building was erected in September 1912. The style followed James Barnet's construction of imposing masonry offices and Edwardian institutional architecture. The Department of Public Instruction changed its name to the Department of Education in 1915 which was subsequently responsible for new changes which substantially laid the foundations for educational practice in the next century. Around the same period, new theories about education emerged. Consequently, this building was pivotal for the many changes to the educational system which developed a whole series of new initiatives and strengthened the role of the Education Department. The government took a more active role in supervising private schools with registration and inspection increasing competition between public and private schools which led to the demise of several private schools. In this building a new syllabus was formed based on the New Education theory which interrelated subjects and stressed the importance of individual learning. Several changes were made to primary and secondary syllabuses over the years and numerous building initiatives were put forward.

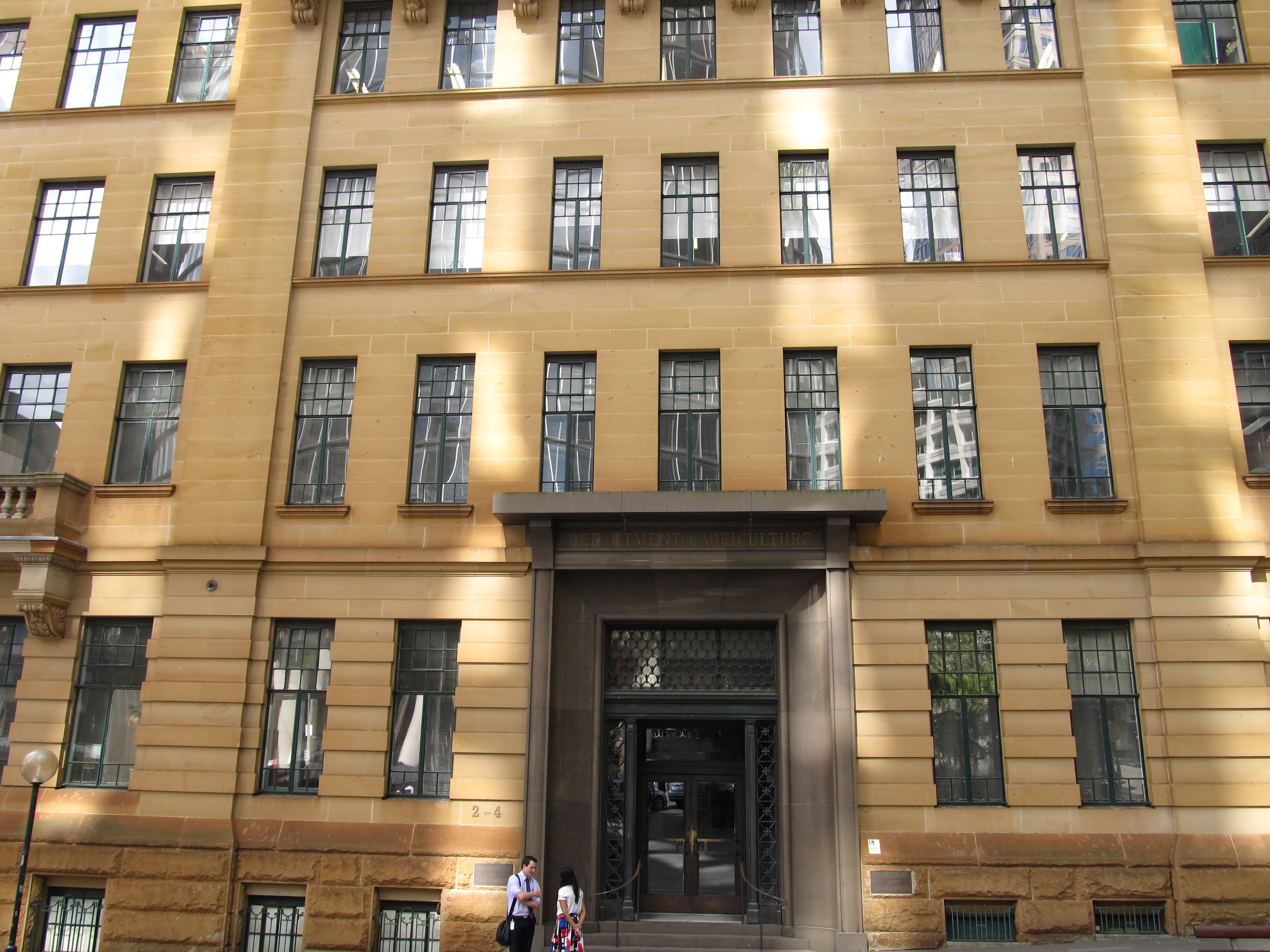
The building's Farrer Place side, built during its second stage

The second stage happened between 1928 and 1930. This time the southern half was designed to match the previous construction. Although, at first it was built to house the Department of Agriculture (the engraved marble over the Farrer Place entrance still reads the words "Department of Agriculture"). Later on, it was partly occupied by the Department of Technical Education but a continued growth in the Education Department squeezed in the early 1970s both these occupants: Department of Technical Education and Department of Agriculture out.

In 1948 an experimental regional office was opened at Wagga Wagga to ease the load and pressure the department was experiencing. The role of the school principal was also increased who looked after curriculum, staffing and finance. The school system had to cope with an enormous expansion in the number of students, a teacher shortage and a shortfall in school accommodation. Education was also effected by the increase in the non-English speaking student population. Thus, the department's role after World War II considerably modified to issuing aims and objectives for schools rather than supervising each school's curriculum and subject content.

In 1890 the Department of Agriculture was formed only playing minor roles for many years. However a growing understanding for need of advice and establishment of research stations increased the department's requirements for office space. Officers were scattered until 1929 when building commenced adjacent to the Department of Education Building. The building offered offices, accommodation and biological, entomological and chemical labs. The role of the department offered advice for farmers for sound management practices, maintained quality control and was also responsible for agricultural education.

In 1978 the Department of Agriculture moved into the McKell building in Rawson Place so the building could be occupied by the Department of Education. Therefore, the Department of Education acquired more land and office space which enabled the Department to work more efficiently and effectively.

The NSW Department of Education moved out in 2018 and as of 2019 the building is being redeveloped by Singapore developer Pontiac, together with the nearby Department of Lands building, to become a luxury hotel, currently marketed as "the sandstone precinct".

== Description ==
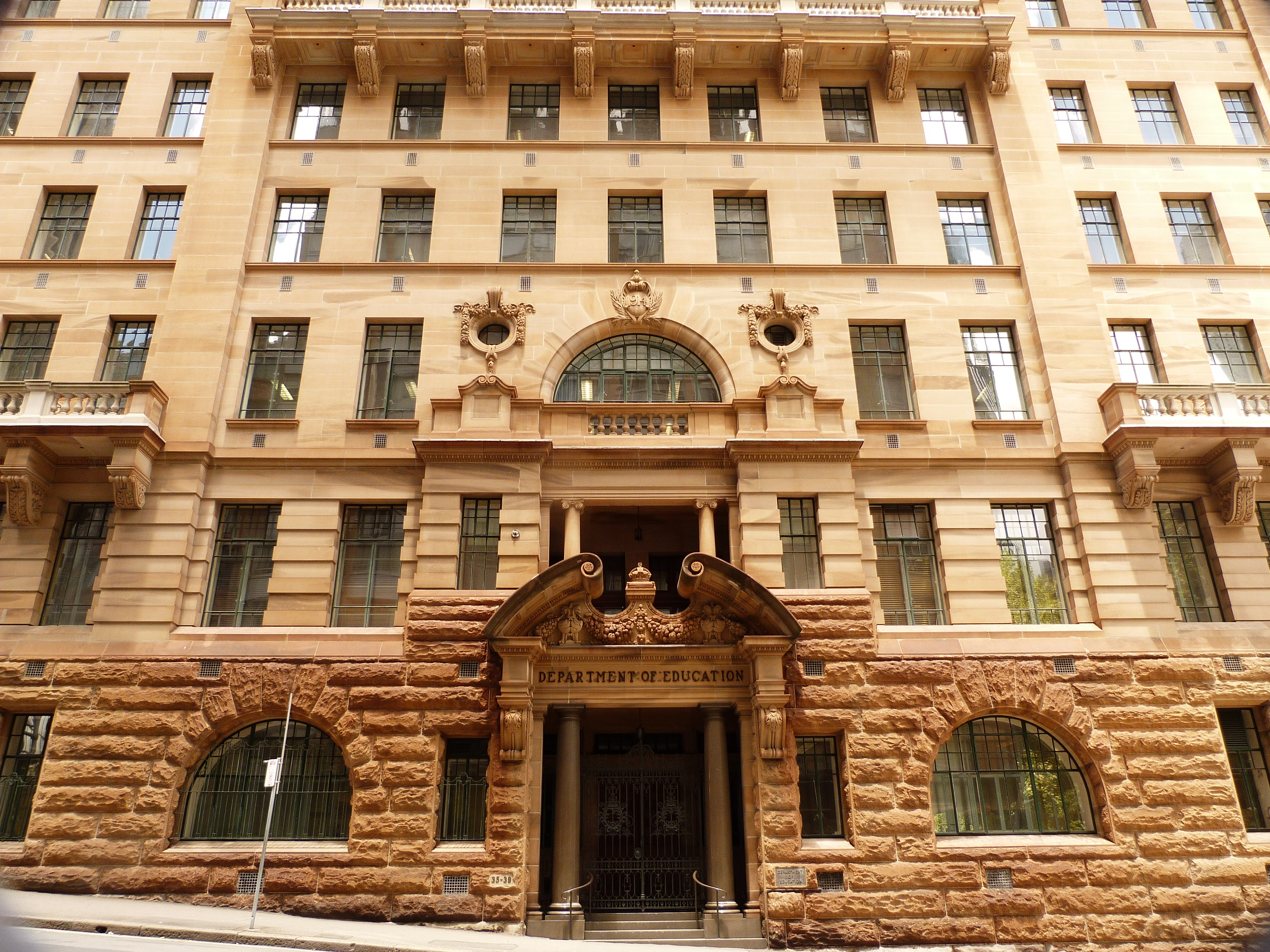
The building's Bridge Street facade

The Department of Education Building occupies a complete city block, its four handsomely detailed sandstone elevations being designed to dominate this area. The northern elevation makes an important contribution to Bridge Street, the monumental simplicity being articulated by the central porch with its broken pediment, a sequence of arched openings and judiciously ornamented balconies and friezes, which are topped by a lofty parapet. The other three elevations generally repeat this formula in a more restrained way. In addition to the important Bridge Street presentation, there are other important views from the First Government House site, from Macquarie Place and along Bent Street, as well as the axial view from O'Connell Street.

The northern half of the building was designed and construction c. 1912-1915 for the Department of Public Instruction, now the Department of Education. The design can be attributed to the Government Architect of the day, George McRae, who as a young man was responsible for the Queen Victoria Building. His later work is characterised by imposing sandstone structures in what may be termed an Edwardian Baroque style, similar to major government buildings being erected in Britain at that time. Central Railway Station (c. 1924) and the Department of Public Instruction (c. 1914) are prime examples of his later work.

Mc Rae intended that the completed buildings would form a quadrangle around a formal garden, and the second, or southern portion, was designed and constructed c. 1928-30 to plans prepared by architects John Reid and Son. These largely followed the formula devised by McRae, but with additional openings to the parapet, and a set back top floor, whose rendered finish somewhat compromised the original intent. This section of the building was constructed for the Department of Agriculture, but since 1967 has been occupied by the Department of Education.

There is no doubt that the formation by successive colonial governments of an administrative enclave in this area to designs by Government Architects such as Lewis, Barnet, Bernon and McRae sought to establish a special precinct, a kind of Antipodean Whitehall. That the Department of Education Building had British prototypes is quite clear. Its style was in what has come to be termed Edwardian Baroque featuring robust stonework broken by a regular rhythm of quasi-Georgian windows, and a strong play of shallow arches and segmental or broken pediments. A very obvious prototype is William Young's War Office, Whitehall of 1898–1906, or in a more general sense the vast civic group at Cardiff, Wales (1897–1906).

The interiors of the Department of Education Building were generally functional, a series of simply partitioned offices and corridors now generally altered to form open plan office space. The exceptions were the imposing entry lobbies and related stairs, the finely wrought Minister's office, (or Board Room), and the top floor exhibition galleries. Here the external language of pillars and pilasters, was combined with deeply coffered ceilings and panelled doors and some exuberant detail: plaster, timber and marble were used to enrich these special areas.

The existing building has been constructed in two sections with several later additions. The first part being the northern section built c. 1912. The structure is steel framed with concrete floor slabs supported on a network of secondary RSJs spanning between primary RSJs which span from perimeter walls to internal columns. Internal concrete encased. From available drawings it cannot be confirmed whether the external walls to the street and the internal walls to the courtyard are steel framed or whether they are of load bearing masonry construction. Most likely they are load bearing masonry. The later southern section was originally the Department of Agriculture built c. 1928. The structure consists of ribbed one way spanning reinforced concrete floor slabs supported by concrete encased steel plated RSJs spanning from internal columns to columns within the external walls. The available drawings indicate that the perimeter walls and courtyard walls are steel framed. Both buildings are stoned clad to perimeter walls and have flat roof construction similar to the floor constructions except that the earlier building has the steel framing and slabs so arranged as to accommodate raised roof lights.

=== Architectural style ===
The Department of Education building clearly demonstrates Edwardian architectural style and planning concepts; its historic features reveal Edwardian taste and customs – for example, the grand sequence from entry porch to ministerial board room. the building, especially where it remains in original condition, a particularly fine example of an early 20th-century government office building, featuring an innovative internal steel frame that allowed for future re-use. Also, some people find an influence of the Federation Warehouse style.

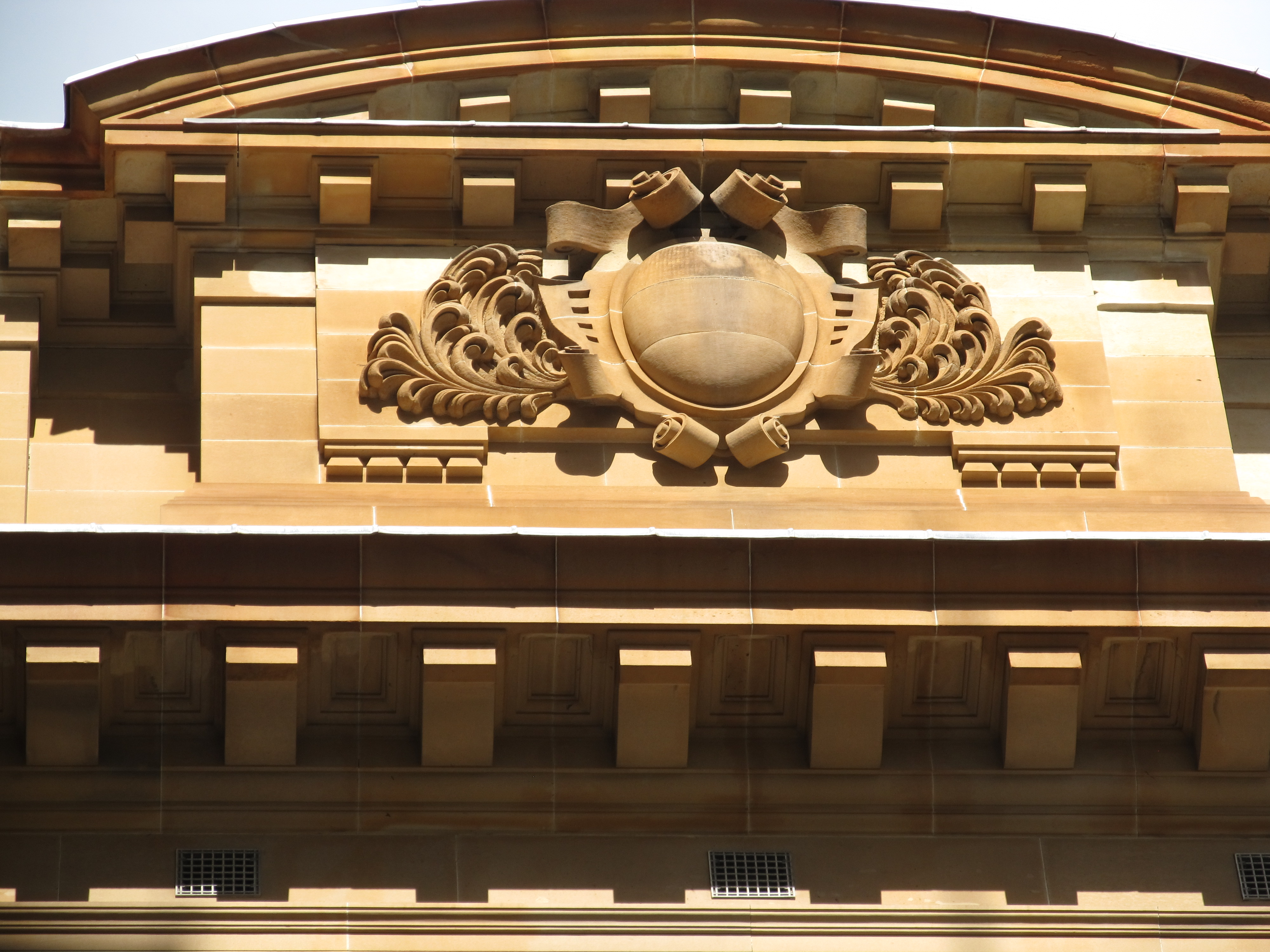
Detail of the decorative stone work on the top of the building, north west corner.

It is a significant example of the Edwardian architecture of the period 1915–1930. While the original design determined the overall external effect, it is interesting to see purer Beaux Arts neo-classical details occurring in the 1929 Farrer Place porch and foyer, and simplified stonework details in this portion of the building. How much they reflect taste rather than economy is unclear. Although, the scale and composition of the building was based on the need to accommodate the department in a government building, and the size and design of the building was acceptable to the Department of Public Instruction (DPI) at the time and funding had been made available by the Treasury.

The importance of education to NSW in 1915 is evident in the number of schools the department was able to build. Department of Public Instruction was the original name of the NSW Department of Education and Training organisation. Its name was changed to "Department of Education" by an Act of the NSW Parliament in 1957.

The Bridge Street building was the seat of various important figures such as:

- Peter Board (1905–1922) who was an Inspector of Schools before he was appointed "Director of Education" (equivalent to the Director-General). Peter Board drafted the new syllabus modelled on a child centred approach with two other inspectors and was appointed Director of Education to implement the recommendations of the Commission of Inquiry into Education (1902–1905).
- Sir Harold Wyndham (1952–1968) who, in the 1950s, carried out the last wide-ranging independent inquiry into public education in NSW. His findings were presented to the then education minister, and resulted in a major redirection of public education including the establishment of comprehensive high schools and changes to the Higher School Certificate (HSC). His educational scheme was introduced in NSW in 1962.

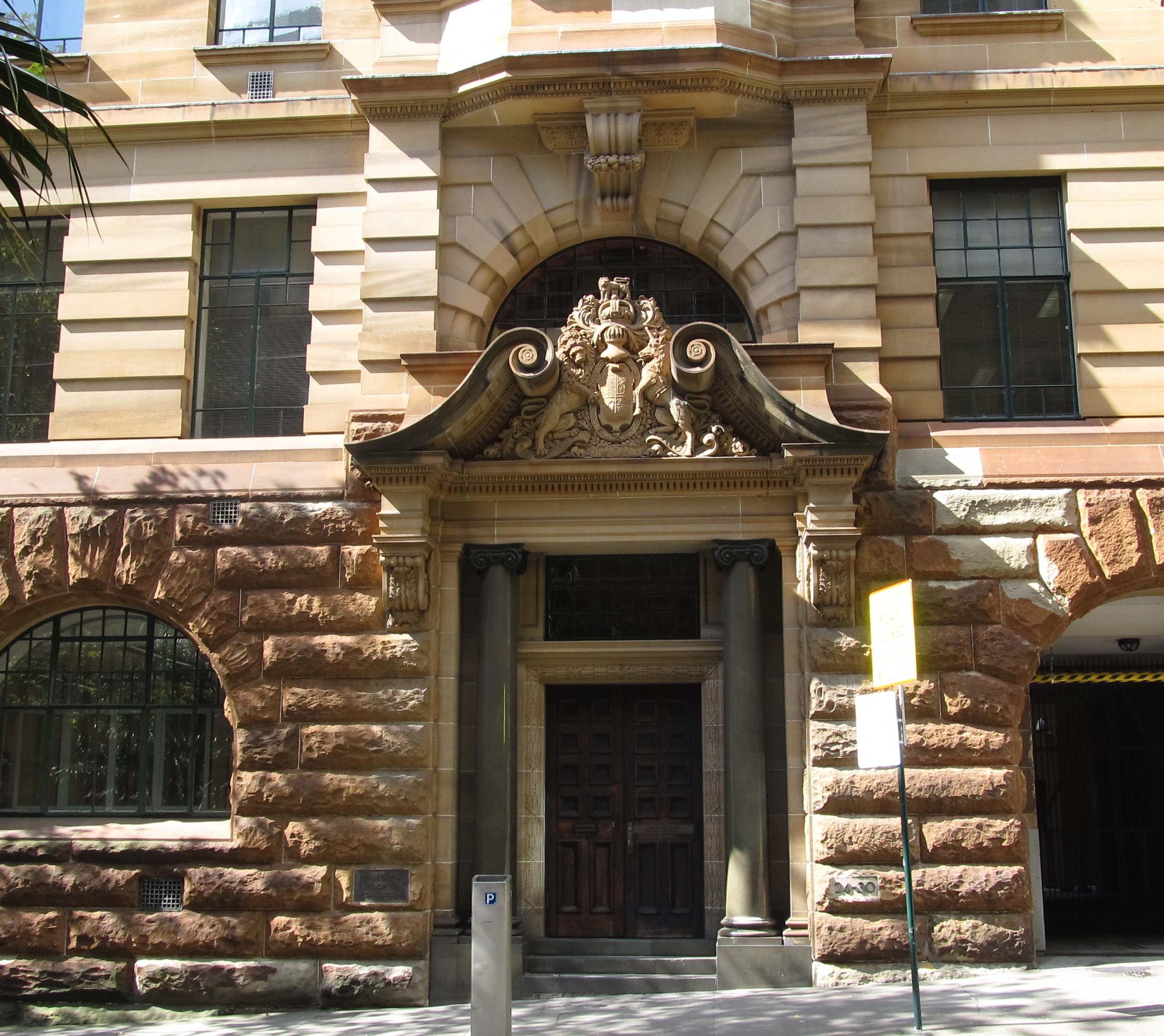
The coat of arms engraved above the building's western entrance, Loftus Street

The building as conceived and built has a considerable degree of unity in its use of materials, form and scale. The external design is highly disciplined and uses a limited palette of materials such as the yellow block sandstone which originally came from quarries in Pyrmont, Ultimo, the Sydney central business district, Paddington, Bondi and Maroubra, metal framed windows, copper-clad skylights. The Education building made a major contribution to this part of Sydney, visually linking with other imposing sandstone government buildings and enhancing a number of important city vistas.

=== Cultural significance ===
The Education Department building was occupied in September 1915. The importance of the department had been recognised in stone if not in architectural excellence. The historic premises have been the "flagship" for the state's education system since the last century (1915–2010). The building has been long associated with key policy makers and bureaucrats.

=== Restoration ===
The building was refurbished in April 1996 and to provide a high standard of modern office accommodation for its occupants while retaining the features of the early 1900s. Barclay Mowlem was engaged to provide the restoration on behalf of the NSW Public Works. Included in the scope of works was:

- Foyers and stair lobbies were preserved and enhanced, with Australian marbles in wall panelling, columns, pilasters and stair surfaces
- Installation of a fully computerised systems to control lighting, security, fire, air-conditioning and lifts, and a satellite communications centre for electronic linkage with every government school and departmental office in NSW
- construction of open-plan office areas for 700 staff.

== Heritage listing ==
The Department of Education building demonstrates Edwardian architectural style and planning concepts; its historic features reveal Edwardian taste and customs – for example, the grand sequence from entry porch to Ministerial Board Room. The building, especially where it remains in original condition, a particularly fine example of an early 20th century government office building, featuring an innovative internal steel frame that allowed for future re-use.

It is an important example of the architecture of the period 1915–1930. While the original design determined the overall external effect, it is interesting to see purer Beaux Arts neo-classical details occurring in the 1929 Farrer Place porch and foyer, and simplified stonework details in this portion of the building. How much they reflect taste rather than economy is unclear.

The importance of education to NSW c. 1915 is manifest in this building and its original budget. Various important figures such as Peter Board and Sir Harold Wyndham are also associated with it. The building as conceived and built, has a considerable degree of unity in its use of materials, form and scale. The external design is highly disciplined, and uses a limited palette of materials: Sydney sandstone, metal framed windows, copper-clad skylights. It makes a major contribution to this part of Sydney, visually linking with other imposing sandstone government buildings and enhancing a number of important city vistas. It clearly has townscape value.

Department of Education building was listed on the New South Wales State Heritage Register on 2 April 1999 having satisfied the following criteria.

The place has a strong or special association with a person, or group of persons, of importance of cultural or natural history of New South Wales's history.

This is an historic site, traditionally associated with a significant government purpose. In its present form it has been associated with a number of significant government Ministers and department heads. It has also been associated with the development of education and agriculture.

The place is important in demonstrating aesthetic characteristics and/or a high degree of creative or technical achievement in New South Wales.

A remarkably fine set of Edwardian baroque sandstone elevations forming a complete city block and providing a landmark building to Bridge Street where it forms a group with the Lands Department and Chief Secretary's Office and the older portions of the Intercontinental hotel (the former Treasury). The fine external character and detailing is also found in several vestibules and several major interiors.

The place has a strong or special association with a particular community or cultural group in New South Wales for social, cultural or spiritual reasons.

As a "flagship" for the State's education system 1915–1990 the building has been long associated with key policy makers, teachers and pupils. The art gallery has been an important venue for many public meetings and exhibitions.

The place has potential to yield information that will contribute to an understanding of the cultural or natural history of New South Wales.

There may be some important scientific associations for both the Departments of Education and Agriculture but they have not been identified, although education theory, and agricultural research are obvious items.

Despite all of the above, this public building was sold off by the Liberal National Party government and renovated as the Capella Hotel, opened in 2023.

== William Wilkins Art Gallery ==
The William Wilkins Art Gallery on Level 7, 35 Bridge Street has been a venue for exhibitions of works in Painting, Drawing, Printmaking, Photo media and Sculpture.

William Wilkins implemented the plans for a government school system in New South Wales and as New South Wales was the first state in Australia to adopt a public school system, the other states originally copied his model. The government of the day brought Wilkins out from England specifically to assist with the development of the public school system as he was well known in England for his expertise and innovation in the education of young people. A few years ago, DET in collaboration with the family of William Wilkins, arranged for a headstone to be made by Miller TAFE College who provided the only stonemasonry course to students which was placed on the grave of Wilkins in Rookwood Necropolis and Justice Michael Kirby and a former student of Fort Street High School, gave the celebratory speech for the ceremony at the Wilkins gravesite during the sesquicentenary of public education in New South Wales.

== See also ==
- Australian non-residential architectural styles
- History of New South Wales
- History of Sydney
