= George McRae =

Scottish-Australian architect (1857–1923)

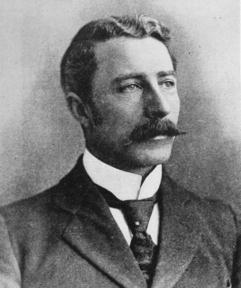
- George McRae, circa 1890
- Born: 10 September 1857; Edinburgh, Scotland
- Died: 16 June 1923 (aged 64); Sydney, New South Wales, Australia
- Occupation: Architect
- Spouse: Katie Prescott
- Practice: NSW Government Architect
- Buildings: Sydney Town Hall (completion); Queen Victoria Building; Corporation Building; Lower entrance to Taronga Zoo

George McRae (10 September 1857 – 16 June 1923) was a Scottish-Australian architect who migrated from his native Edinburgh to Sydney, where he became Government Architect of New South Wales and designed some of Sydney's best-known buildings, including completion of the Sydney Town Hall, the Queen Victoria Building, and the lower entrance to Taronga Zoo.

== Life ==
George McRae was born in Edinburgh in 1857. The register of his birth records his father as Duncan (joiner journeyman) and his mother as Mary. He arrived in Sydney in 1884 and was appointed Assistant Architect in the City Architect's office. He became City Architect and City Building Surveyor in 1889. He held this position until 1897, when he was appointed Principal Assistant Architect to Walter Liberty Vernon in the Government Architect's Branch. In 1912 he succeeded Vernon as New South Wales Government Architect and held the position until he died in 1923.

McRae married Katie Prescott in St Mark's Church, Darling Point on 8 May 1895.

== Career ==
George McRae was responsible for the design of many buildings in Sydney and other places, several of which still survive, some of which are listed on various heritage registers. Works undertaken by McRae during his term as Government Architect included the Department of Education Building 1912; Parcels Post Office 1913; Taronga Zoo lower entrance, top entrance, and Indian elephant house; additions to the Colonial Treasury Building in Bridge Street, and Cessnock Court House. Some of the extant buildings are:

- Rozelle Tram Depot, Glebe, New South Wales, 1904; Federation Queen Anne style, saw-tooth, corrugated iron roof concealed by a brick stepped parapet structure.
- Department of Education Building, Bridge Street, Sydney, 1912; a six-storey sandstone building with steel and reinforced concrete structure and a central light-well, listed on the New South Wales State Heritage Register and the (since defunct) Register of the National Estate.
- Model factory and dwelling, The Rocks, 120 Gloucester Street, 1912–13, replacing a sordid slum complex in a manner which reflected the humanitarian principles of the garden city movement.
- Former Parcels Post Office, Railway Square, Sydney, 1913; a brick and sandstone building in the Federation Free Classical style, described as "an ingeniously designed and monumental building." This distinctive building used to house a post office, Telecom Telex machine centre and a tool store; it has now been fully restored and reopened as an "executive hotel".
- Taronga Zoo lower entrance, top entrance and Indian elephant house, Mosman, Sydney, 1916; replaced first zoo at Moore Park, has a Local Government Heritage listing.
- Corporation Building, Hay Street, Sydney, c. 1893; known at first as the Municipal Building, this building combined Queen Anne and Anglo-Dutch influences, and originally had a ground-floor market stall arcade. The building is listed on the state and local government heritage registers; and the (since defunct) Register of the National Estate.
- Additions to the Colonial Treasury Building, Bridge Street, Sydney, originally built circa 1849, extensions circa 1896; listed on the New South Wales Heritage Register and the (since defunct) Register of the National Estate.
- Queen Victoria Building, George Street, Sydney, 1893–98; a sandstone masterpiece in American Romanesque style, reopened in 1986 as a retail centre after major restoration, and listed on the (since defunct) Register of the National Estate
- Former Sydney City Markets, Ultimo Road, Haymarket, 1910. Part of the market complex that included the vegetable market, Hay Street, and the markets bell tower, Quay Street. Later converted to a hotel.
- Corn Exchange, Sussex Street, Sydney; built by City Council in 1887 and attributed to McRae. A two-storey building with an unusual curved facade, listed on the New South Wales State Heritage Register and the (since defunct) Register of the National Estate.
- Court House, Maitland Street, Cessnock, New South Wales; the State Government set aside land in 1905 that established Cessnock as the administrative centre of the coal fields in that part of the Hunter Valley. This included the court house, which now has a Local Government Heritage listing.
- St James railway station, listed on the New South Wales State Heritage Register.
- In 1916 he started work on Wilson Memorial Community Hospital.

== Funeral ==
McRae's funeral was held on 18 June 1923 at Rookwood Cemetery and was attended by a large number of people from the Public Works Department and other government departments. He was survived by his wife, son and two daughters.

== Gallery ==
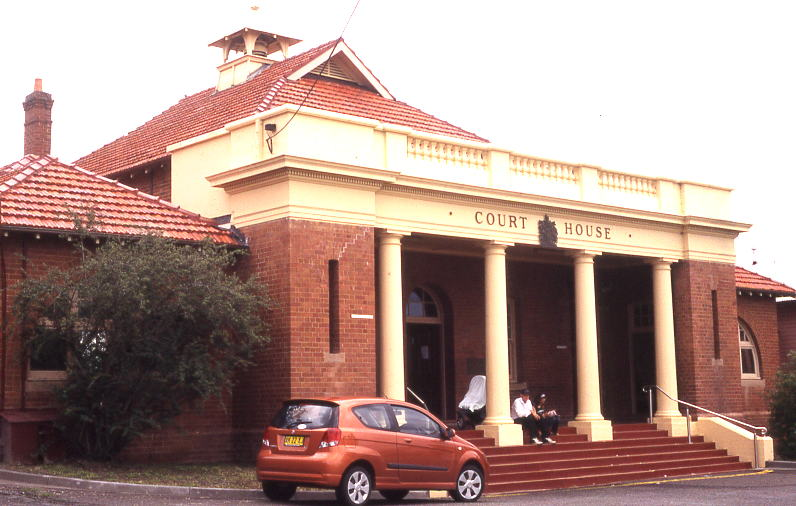
Cessnock Court House.

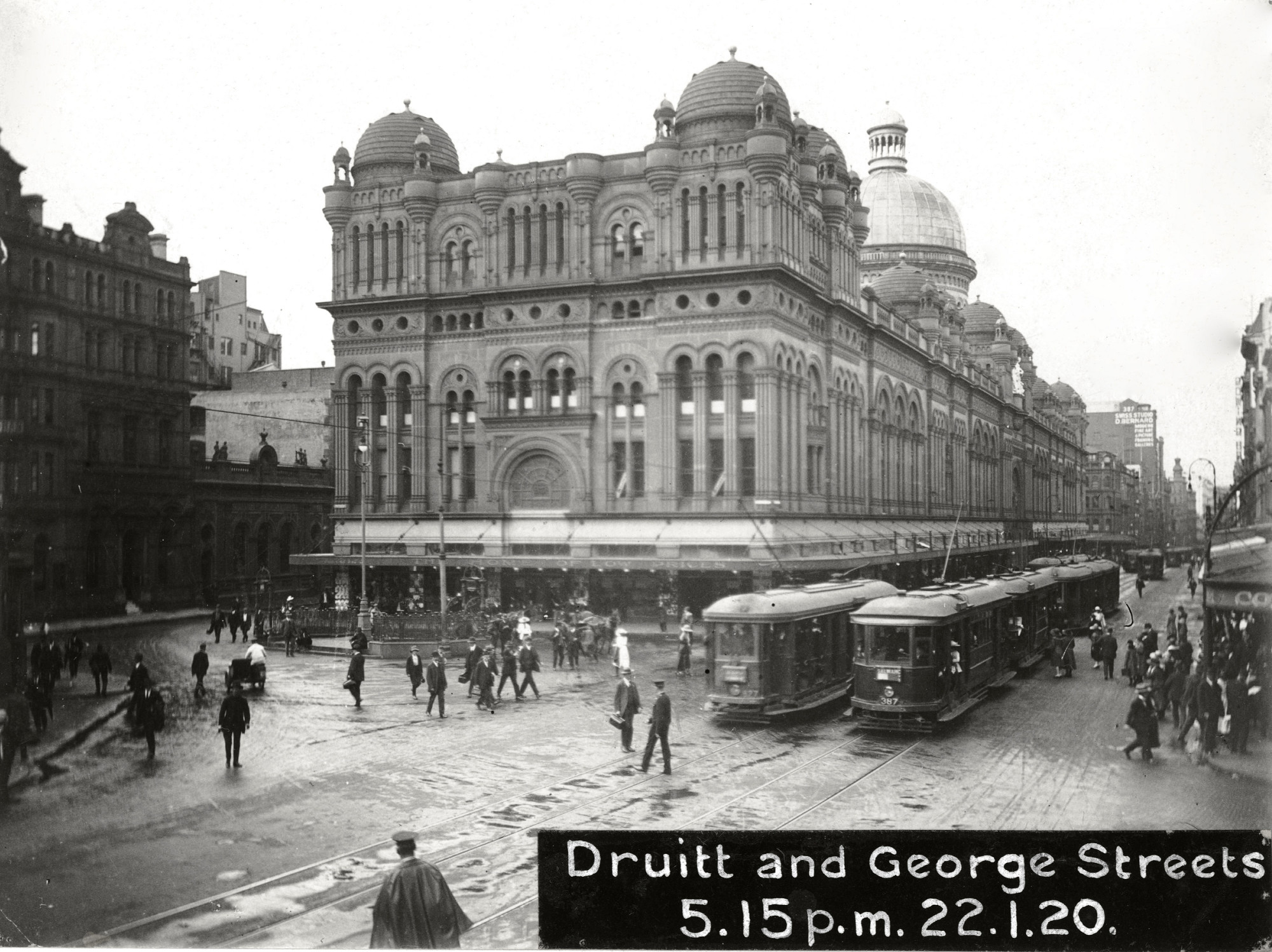
Queen Victoria Building with Sydney's former tram service in view, c. 1920.

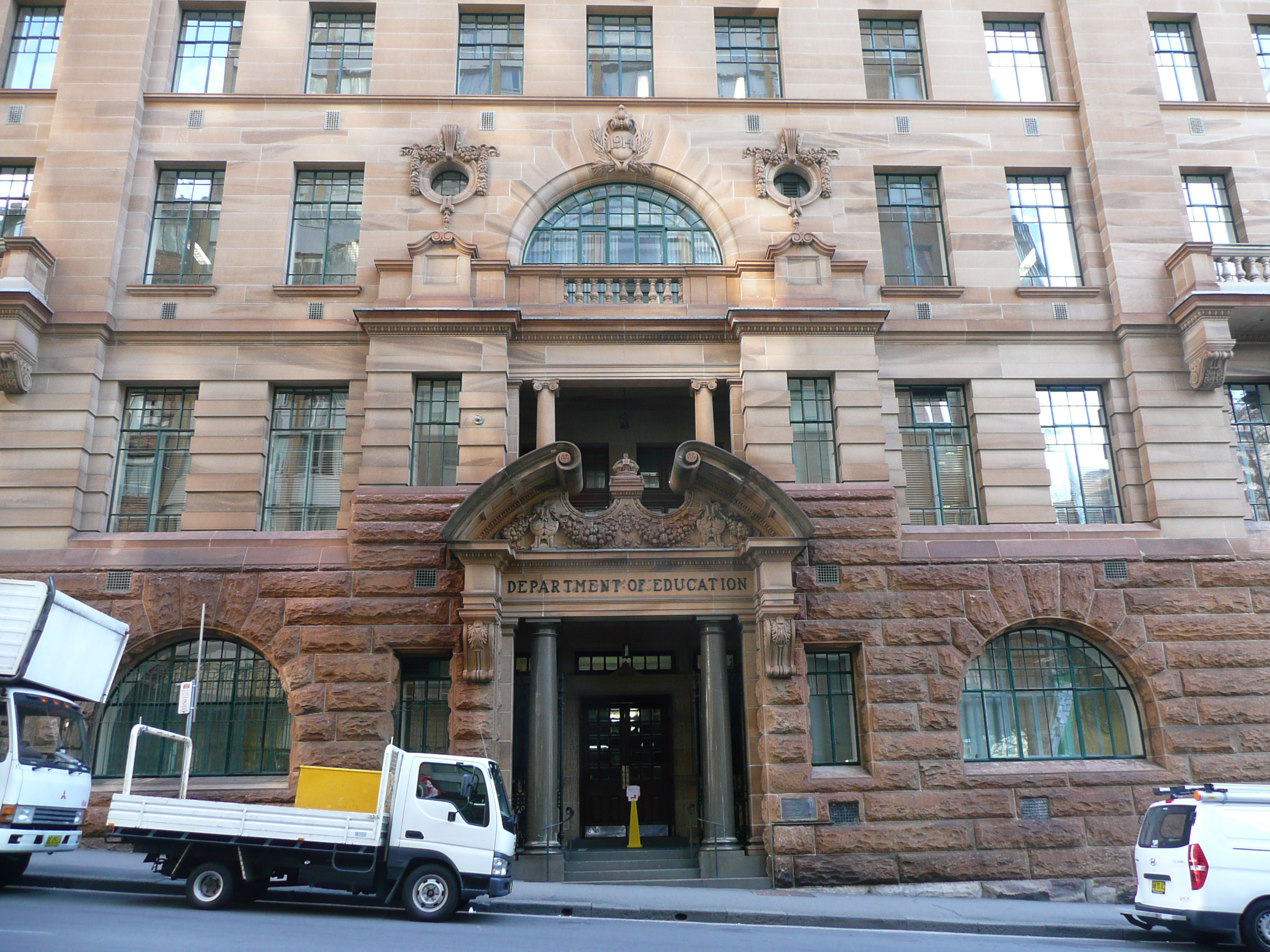
Department of Education Building, Bridge Street, Sydney.

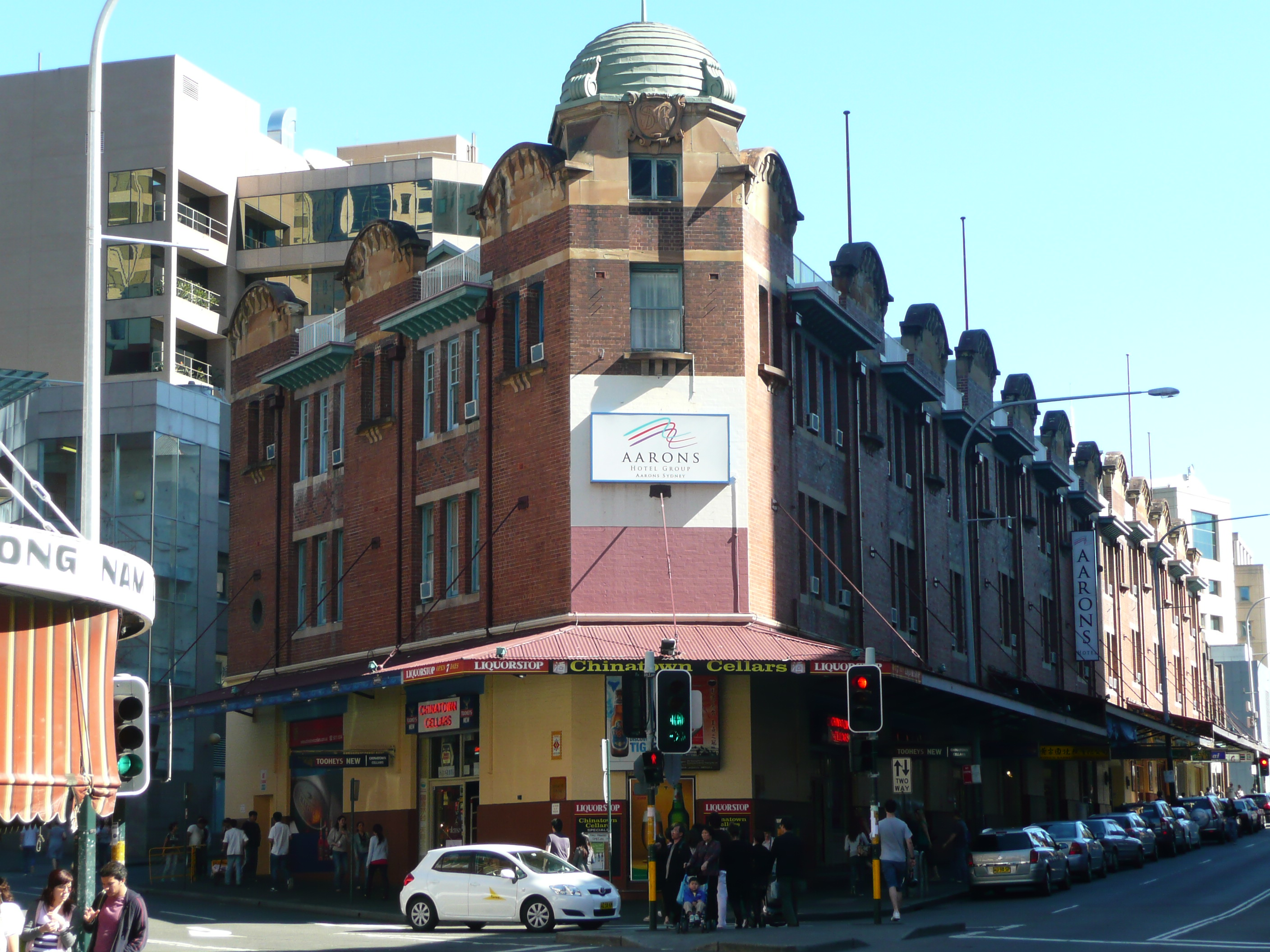
Former City Markets building, Ultimo Street, Haymarket.

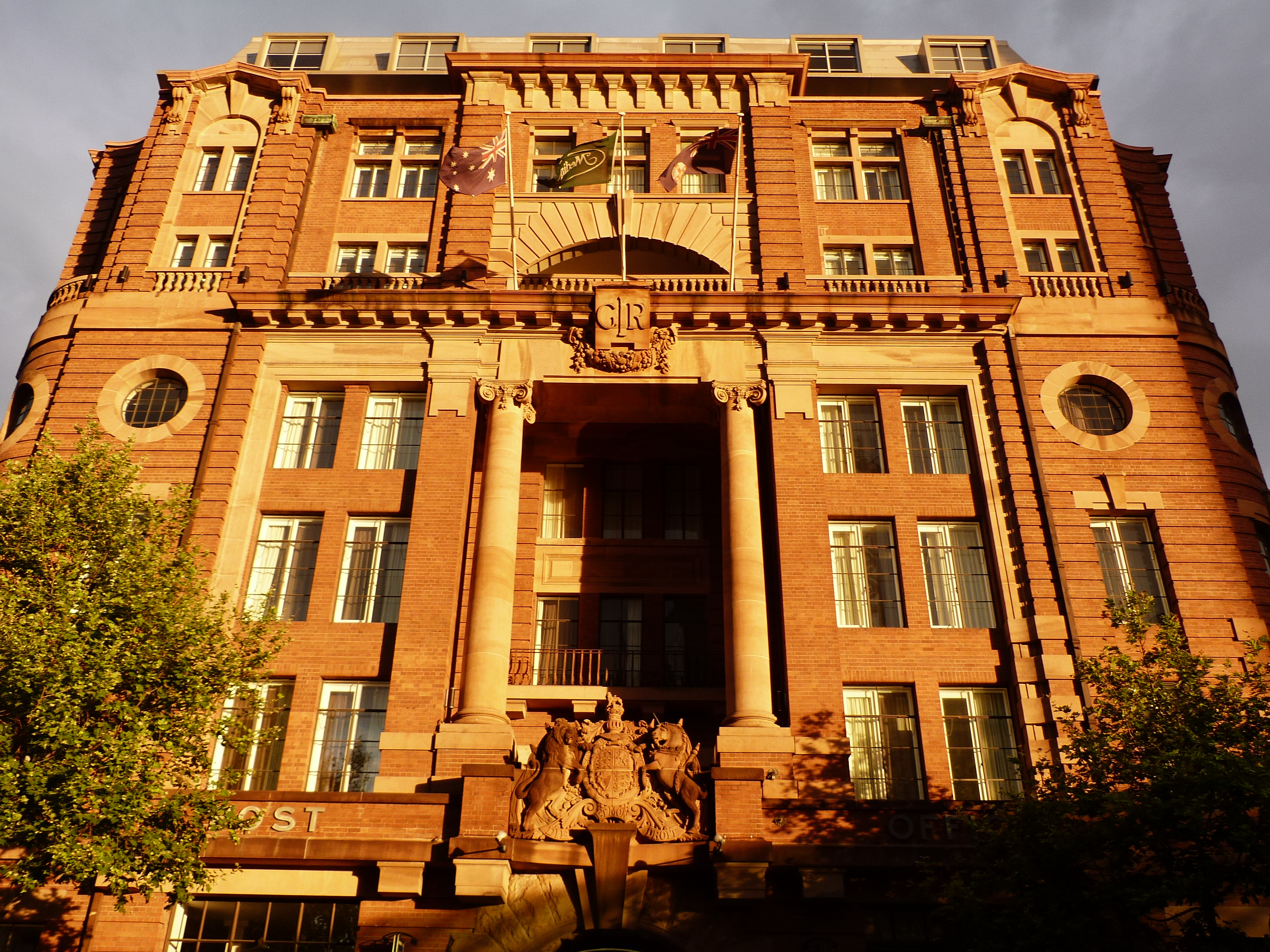
Former Parcel Post Office, Railway Square, Sydney.

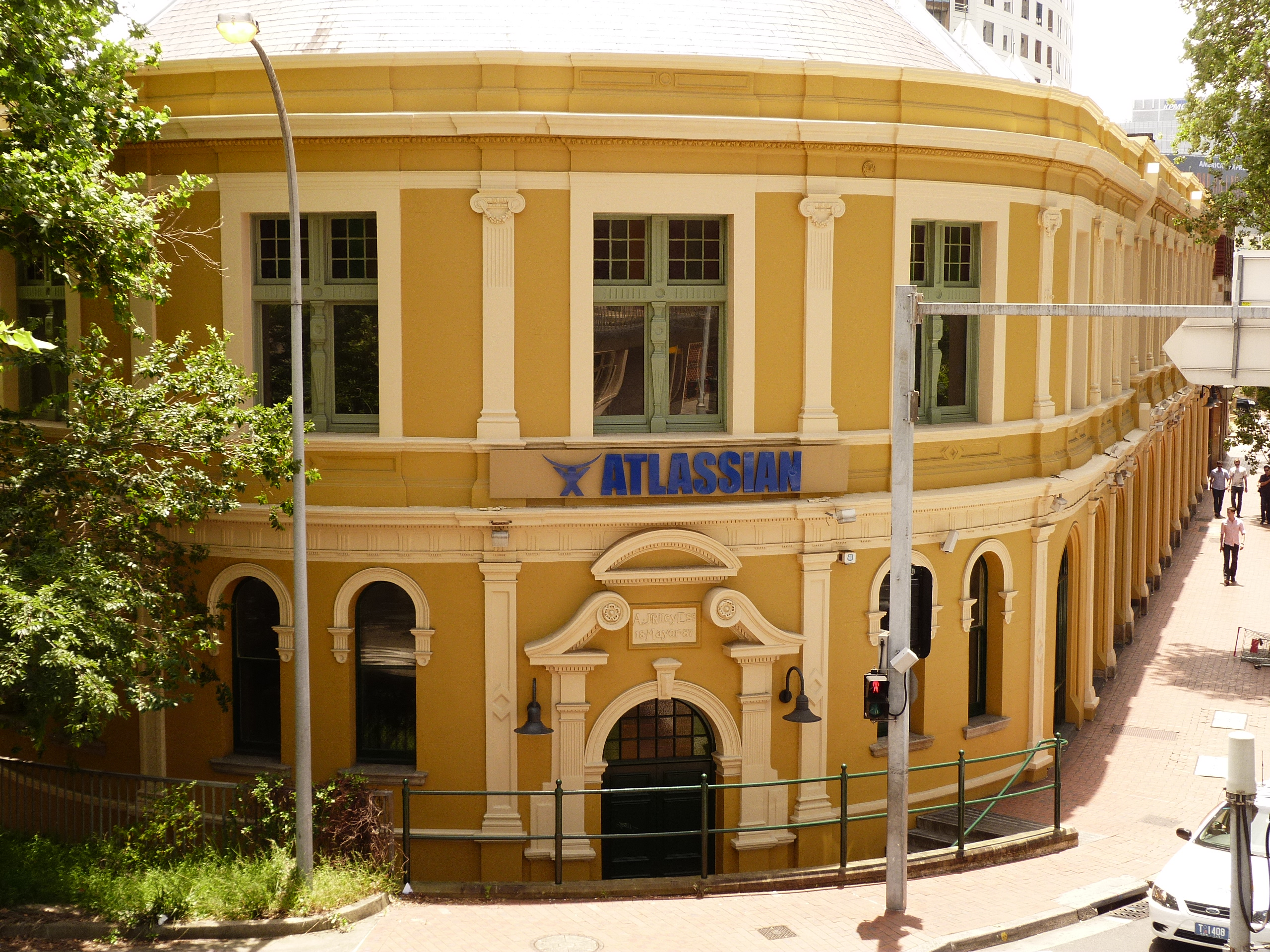
Corn Exchange building, Sussex Street, Sydney.

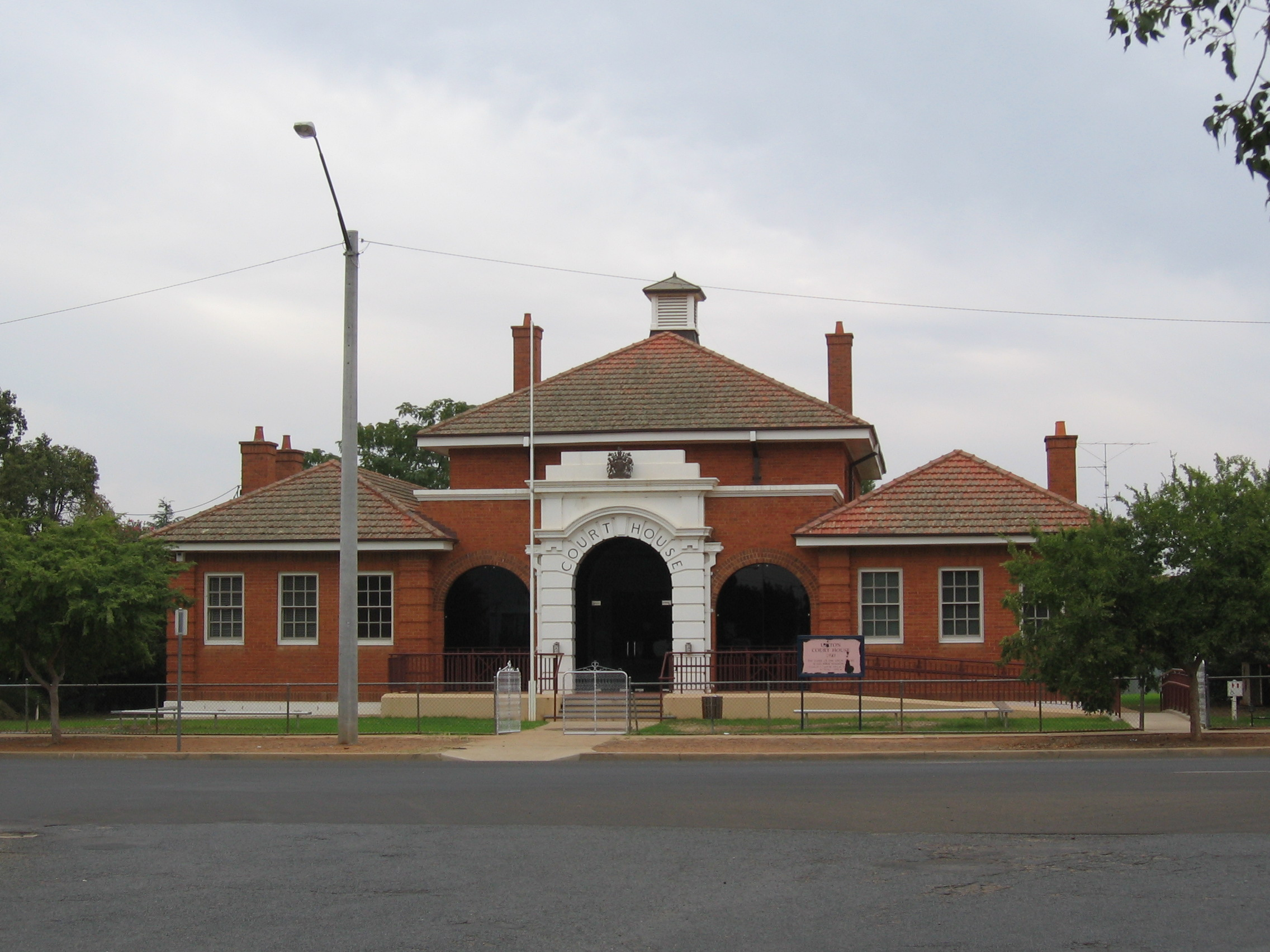
Leeton Courthouse, completed in 1943 in the Interwar Stripped Classical style.

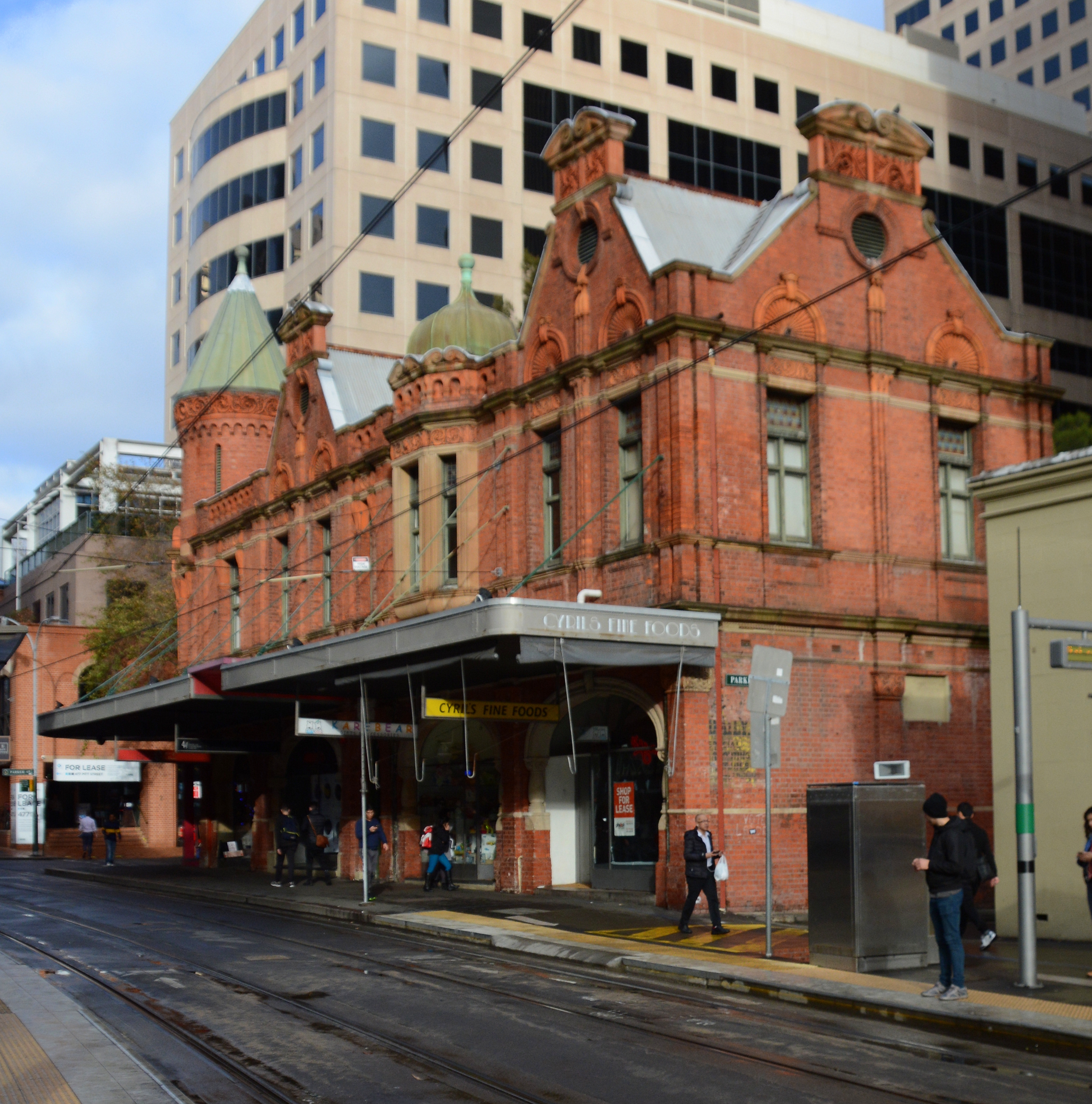
Corporation Building, 181–187 Hay Street, Sydney.
