= Department of Lands Building =

Heritage-listed government building in Sydney, Australia

Department of Lands building
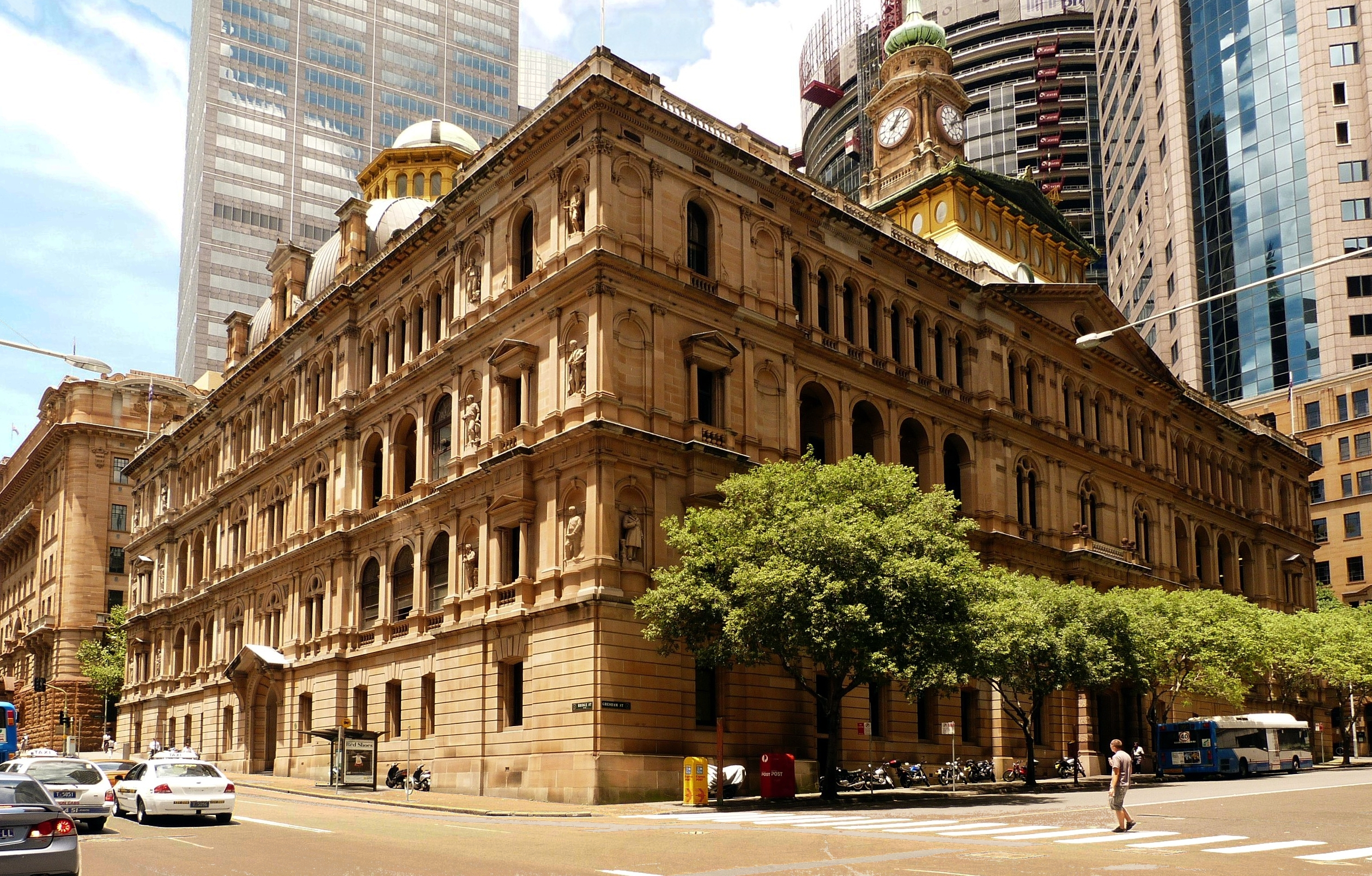
- Bridge Street façade of the Department of Lands building

- Location within Sydney

General information
- Type: Government administration
- Architectural style: Victorian Renaissance Revival
- Location: 22–33 Bridge Street, Sydney, New South Wales, Australia
- Coordinates: 33°51′50″S 151°12′36″E
- Current tenants: Pontiac Land Group
- Construction started: 1876
- Estimated completion: 1892
- Owner: Government of New South Wales

Height
- Roof: Copper dome, 17 metres (55 ft) square to octagon

Dimensions
- Other dimensions: Clock tower with copper 'onion' top

Technical details
- Structural system: Reinforced concrete slabs
- Material: Pyrmont sandstone
- Floor count: 3

Design and construction
- Architects: James Barnet (1876–1881); Walter Liberty Vernon (1888–1892); William Edmund Kemp (n.d.)
- Architecture firm: Colonial Architect of New South Wales
- Developer: Government of New South Wales
- Main contractor: John Young (1876–1881); Waine & Baldwin (1888–1890)

New South Wales Heritage Register
- Official name: Lands Department Building
- Type: State heritage (built)
- Designated: 2 April 1999
- Reference no.: 744
- Type: Administration Office
- Category: Government and Administration

The Department of Lands building is a heritage-listed state government administrative building of the Victorian Renaissance Revival architectural style located in Bridge Street in the Sydney central business district of New South Wales, Australia. The large three-storey public building was designed by Colonial Architect James Barnet and built in different stages, with Walter Liberty Vernon and William Edmund Kemp designing various components of the building. The builder was John Young.

The building was initially occupied by the NSW Department of Lands, which has a long association with the public life of New South Wales, especially the rapid expansion of settlement during the later part of the 19th century. It was added to the New South Wales State Heritage Register on 2 April 1999. In the late 1980s, the building was earmarked by the NSW Government as one of the possible sites for conversion into a casino. A permanent conservation order covering the premises was passed by the Heritage Council of New South Wales in order to protect the building from unsympathetic development. The NSW Department of Planning moved out in 2016 and as of 2024 the building was being redeveloped by Singapore developer Pontiac Land Group, together with the nearby Department of Education building, to become a luxury hotel, currently marketed as "the sandstone precinct".

== Location ==
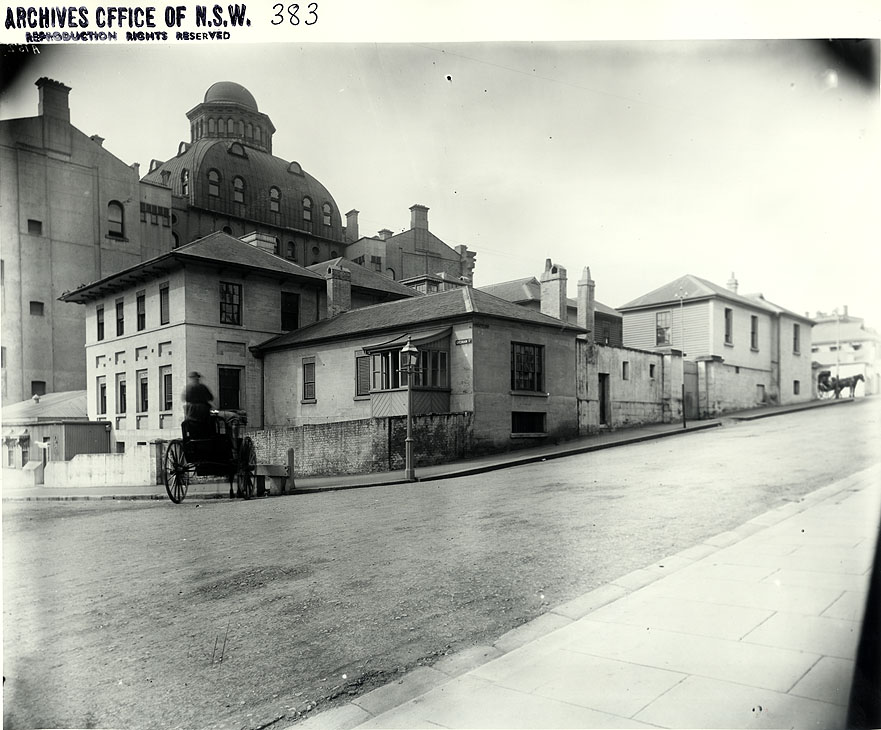
The corner of Gresham and Bent Street in the 1880s, with older structures pre-dating the Lands Department Building. The Bridge Street half of the building which was completed first, is visible in the background

In 1876 when construction of the Lands Department building commenced, the location of the inaugural and temporary Government House was at the junction of what is now known as Bridge and Phillip Streets, a site now occupied by the Museum of Sydney. At that time, Bridge Street ran from George Street to Government House. The Lands Department building was located immediately 'down hill' from Government House and occupied a city block bounded by Bridge, Loftus, Bent and Gresham Streets. The design of the three-storey building, plus basement, provided uninterrupted views from its north-facing verandahs to Port Jackson and Sydney Cove.

For many years the building served as the head office for the highly influential Surveyor General and the Colonial Architect.

== History ==
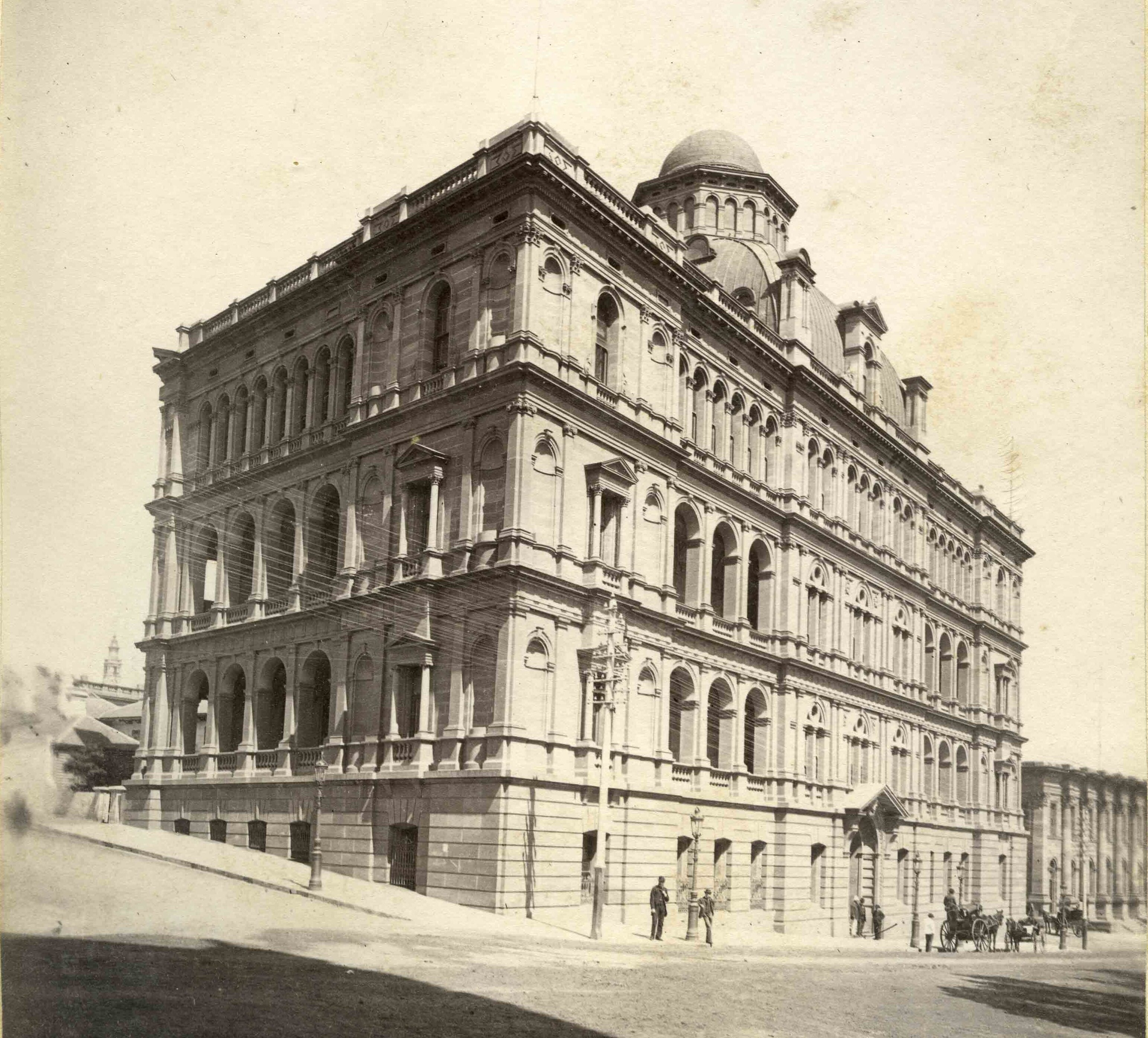
The partially constructed building in 1885, viewed from Bridge Street

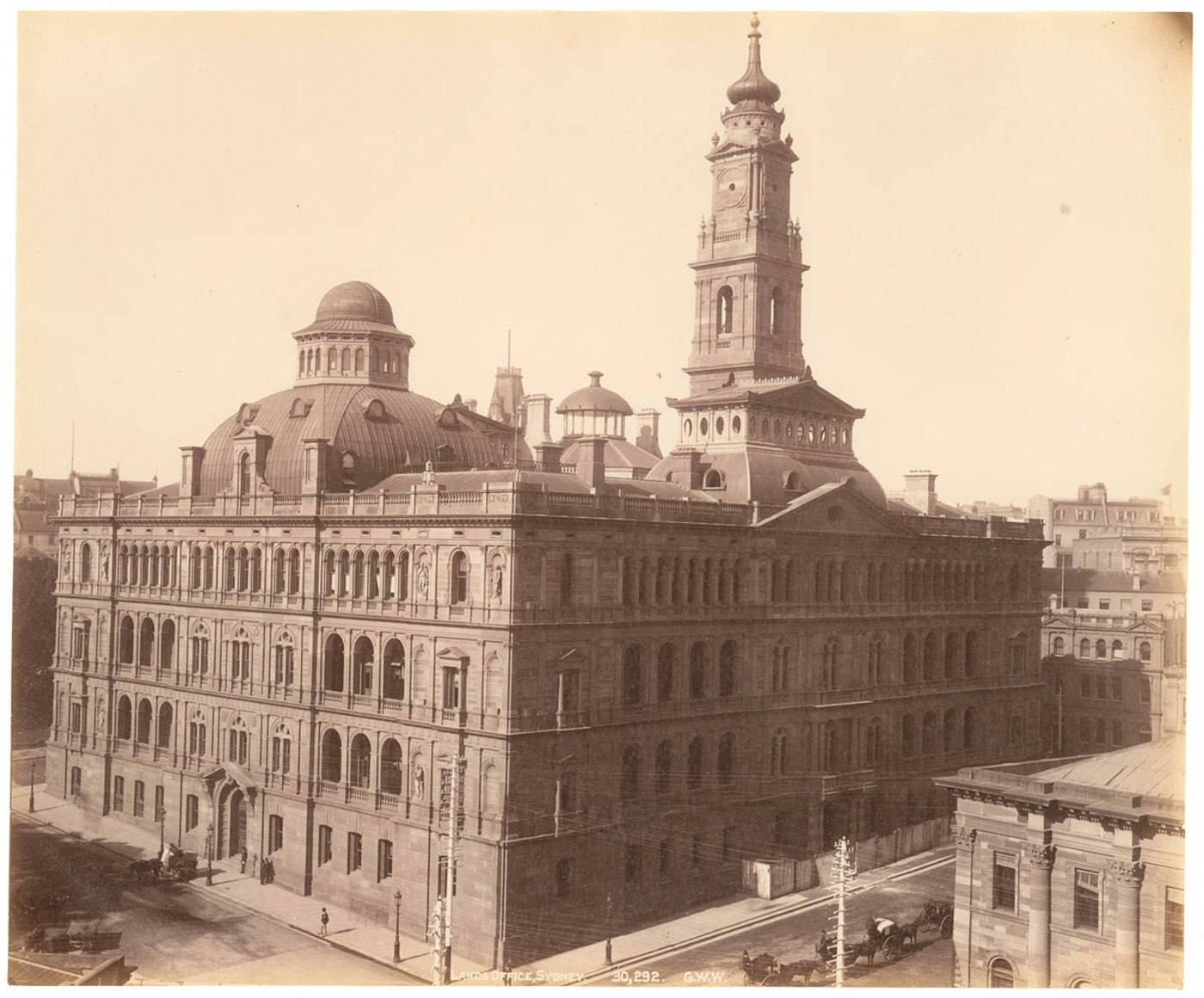
The completed building in 1893

The Lands Department Building was designed by the Colonial Architect James Barnet, and was built in two stages. The first stage was between 1876 and 1881; the second stage was between 1888 and 1892 under the supervision of the Colonial Architect Walter Vernon (it was completed two years into Vernon's tenure in this role). The first stage saw the use of reinforced concrete slabs by the builder John Young who was Sydney's first protagonist of ferro-cement construction.

Sometime between 1887 and 1894 the Lands Department Datum Bench Mark Plug was set into position on the front of the building and provided the origin of all levels in NSW under the Survey Co-ordination Act. In 1938, a clock for the tower and a clock system throughout the building to be driven electronically by a pendulum master clock were installed by Prouds Limited. The whole system was Australian made.

In the late 1980s, the building was earmarked by the NSW Government as one of the possible sites for conversion into a casino. A Permanent Conservation Order covering the premises was passed by the NSW Heritage Council in order to protect the building from unsympathetic development.

The NSW Department of Planning and Environment moved from the former Lands Department building in September 2016. Up until now, the NSW Government Department (of Lands) had been in the Bridge Street building since it was completed in 1892. The building will be refurbished into a hotel where the historical features will be retained for visitors to enjoy.

== Description ==
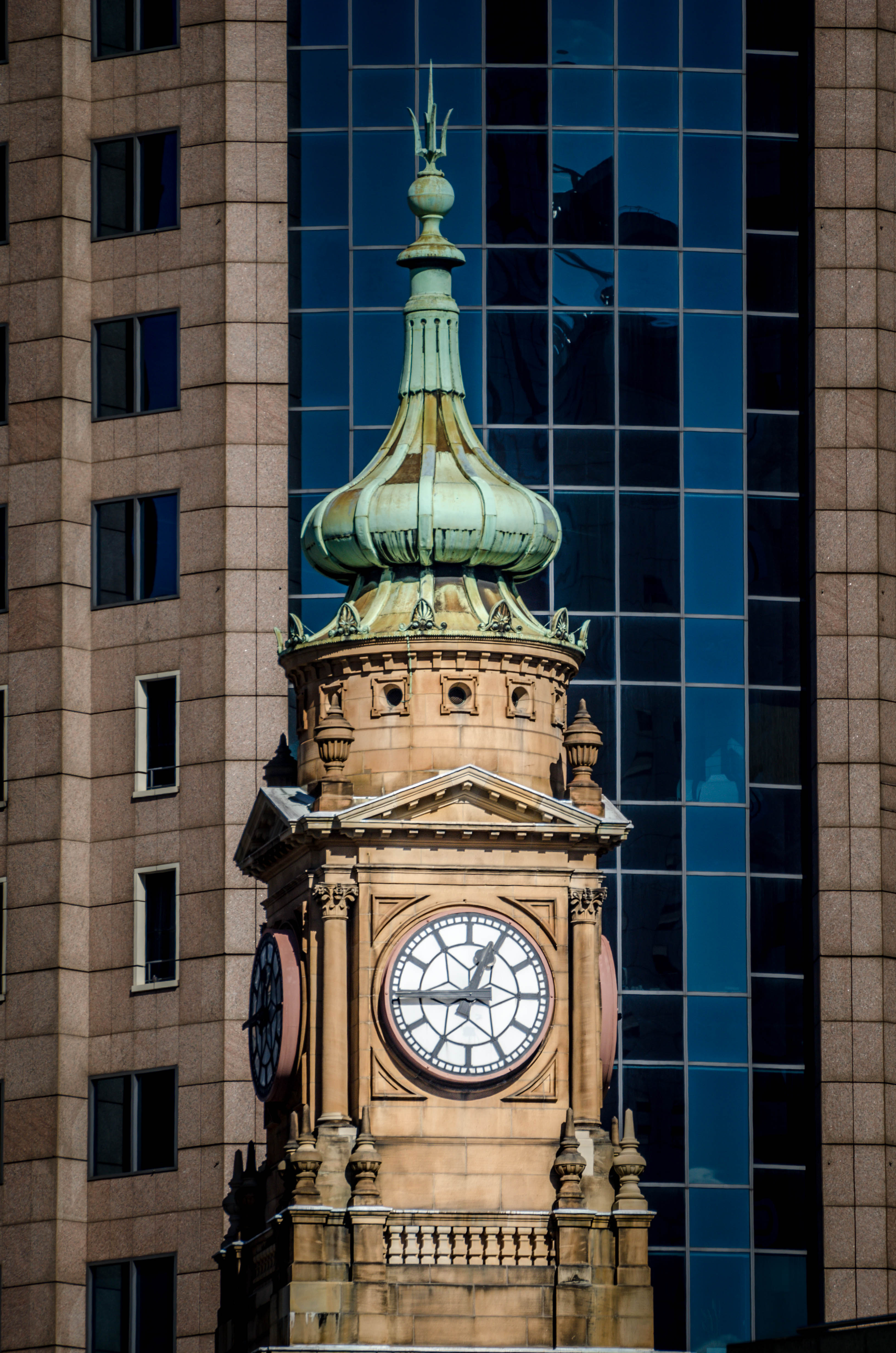
The distinctive 'onion' clock tower

Barnet, who favoured Classical styles in his public building projects, designed the building in the Victorian Renaissance Revival architectural style. It was built between 1876 and 1892 as a large three-storey sandstone administration building with basement.

The basement has three entrances: the main entrance in Bridge Street, and two others in Gresham Street (one originally used for carriage). The façades are of dressed Pyrmont sandstone with cornices and balusters at each floor level, with a dome and tower tops made from copper. The four façades are all richly decorated with classical motifs and statuettes and are dissimilar to each other. Barnet's mix of the orders and their integration into the building is significant. For example, the lowest level of the building is adorned with Doric and Ionic pilasters, whereas Corinthian and Ionic ones are used above. The clock tower has an 'onion' copper dome which was influenced by Sir Henry Parkes's water carafe.

The ground, first, and second floors have pilasters and entablatures of the Doric, Ionic and Corinthian orders respectively, each standing on appropriate pedestals. The pitched roof is behind a balustraded parapet. A large copper dome 17 metres (55 ft) square at the base changing to an octagon at the top and carrying an octagonal lantern with revolving copper dome roof rises above the Bridge Street facade.

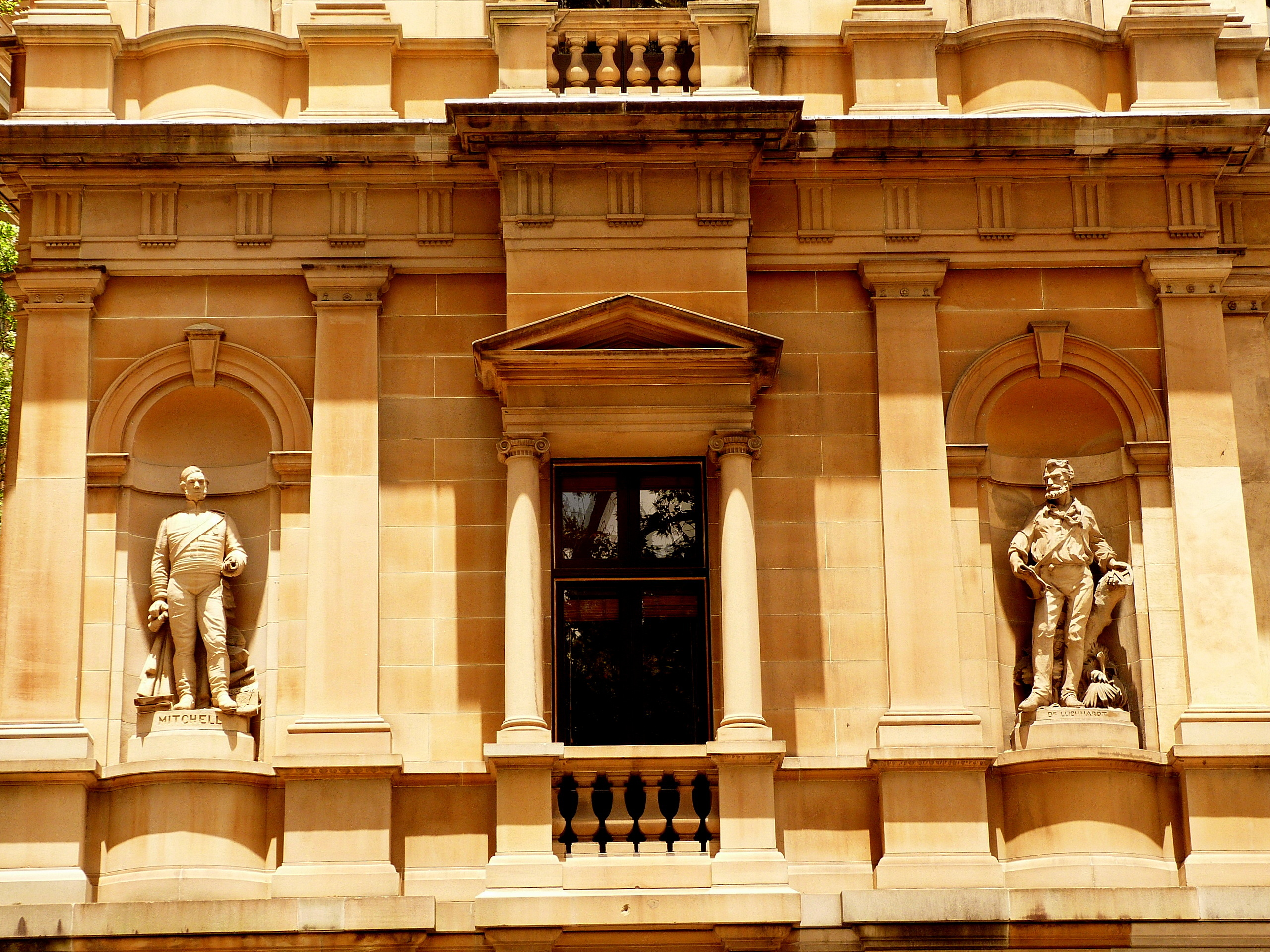
Niche detail, including statues of Sir Thomas Mitchell and Ludwig Leichhardt

The centre compartments of Gresham and Loftus Streets have pediments backed up by high mansard roofs. A clock tower with copper "onion" top closes the vistas in Bent and Spring Streets. The elevations have arched windows and verandah openings, and niches for statuary. There is delicately formed cast-iron work to the entrance gates and window grilles, and large flights of stairs and cantilevered balconies and bridges around the courtyards.

The internal walls are of brick with reinforced concrete floors and ceiling, iron girders and iron-framed roofing. Externally, the building's original facade is unchanged.

At the time of its completion, it was the largest of public buildings, boasting the latest in office technology at the time – speaking tubes, pneumatic bells, spiral stairs, and a mosaic of Queen Victoria's coat of arms at the entrance. Barnet designed the building with a plan room with a heavy, fireproof metal door.

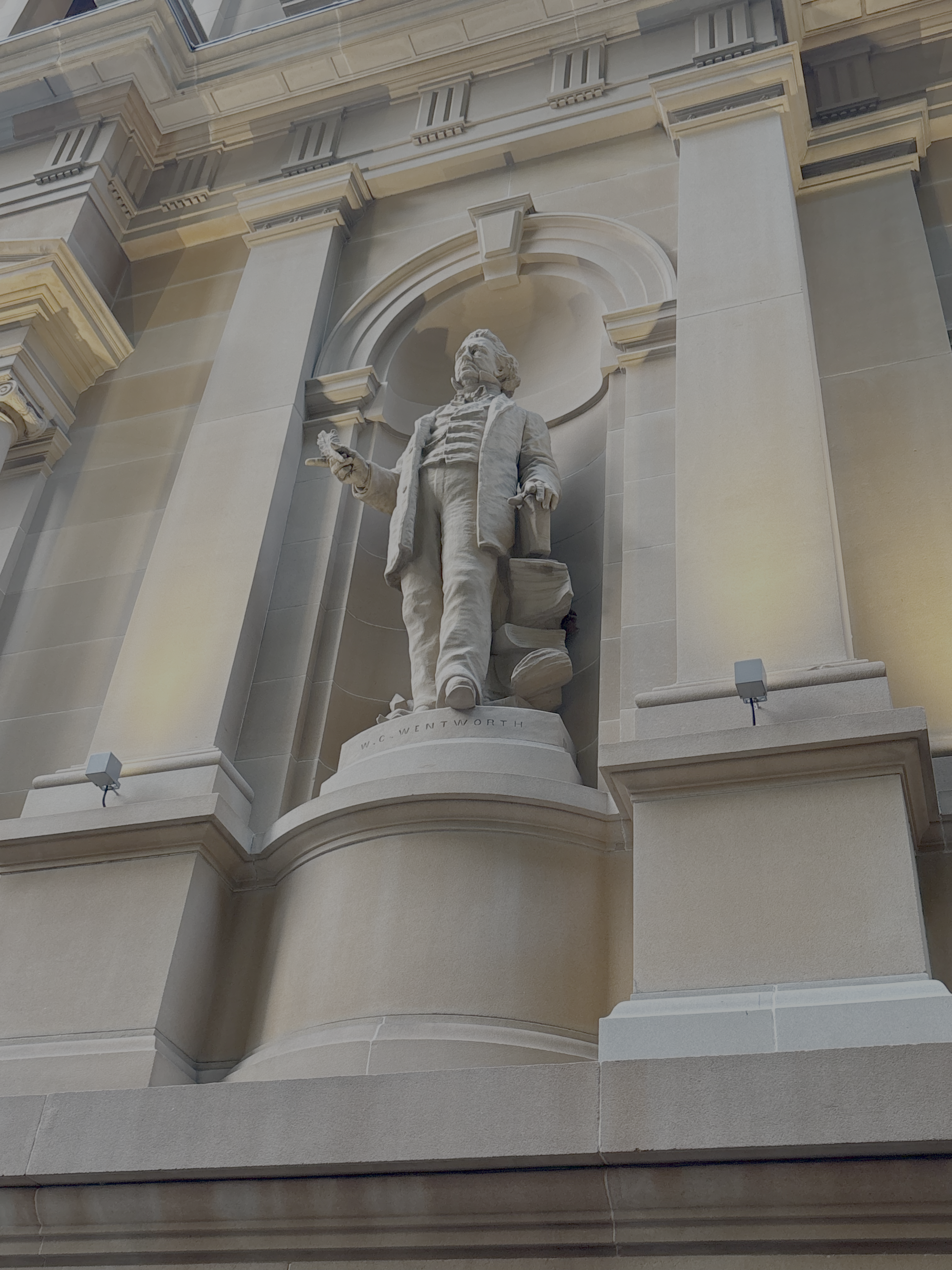
Statue of William Charles Wentworth

Each of the four façades has twelve niches whose sculpted occupants include explorers and legislators who made a major contribution to the opening up and settlement of the nation. Although 48 men were nominated by Barnet as being suitable subjects, most were rejected as being 'hunters or excursionists'. Only 23 statues were commissioned including Hamilton Hume, William Hovell, Major Sir Thomas Mitchell, Gregory Blaxland, William Lawson, William C. Wentworth, George Bass, Matthew Flinders and Sir Joseph Banks. The last statue added was James Meehan in 2010, leaving 24 niches unfilled.

=== Modifications and dates ===
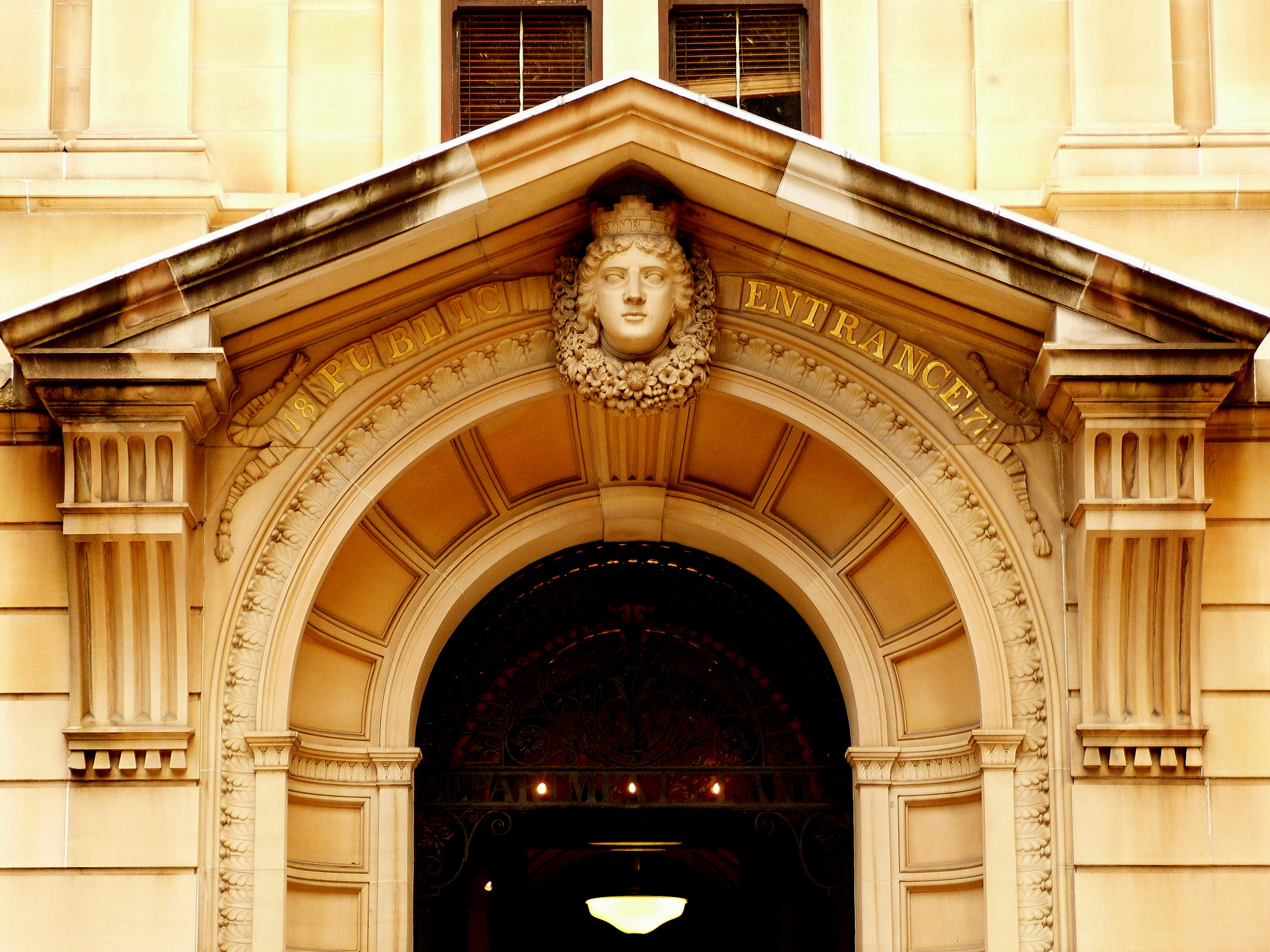
Detail of main entrance

In November 2010 a new statue of colonial surveyor James Meehan (1774–1826) was created and placed in an empty niche on the corner of Loftus and Bent Streets. Meehan was transported to NSW due to involvement in the Irish Rebellion of 1798. He arrived in Sydney in 1800 and, as a teacher and skilled surveyor, was assigned as a servant to Acting Surveyor-General, Charles Grimes. Within two years he had been on two major expeditions and, by 1806, had been conditionally pardoned. He continued to work on departmental duties, and, from difficult beginnings, a remarkable rose to be an important colonial surveyor, explorer and settler, surveying and mapping large areas of the country. The early towns of Sydney, Parramatta, Bathurst, Port Macquarie and Hobart were all explored, laid out and measured by Meehan. The statue was commissioned by the Land & Property Management Authority to commemorate Meehan's close collaboration with NSW Public Works Heritage Services and the Government Architect's Office. Meehan was also associated with Macquarie Field House, Campbelltown an early country estate and farm, separately listed on the NSW State Heritage Register.

=== Further information ===
Maintain original plan configuration and retain all original fabric and detailing if possible. Retain the same continuous usage of the building. Conservation Plan was prepared in 1985, however it is recommended that this plan be updated.

== Heritage listing ==
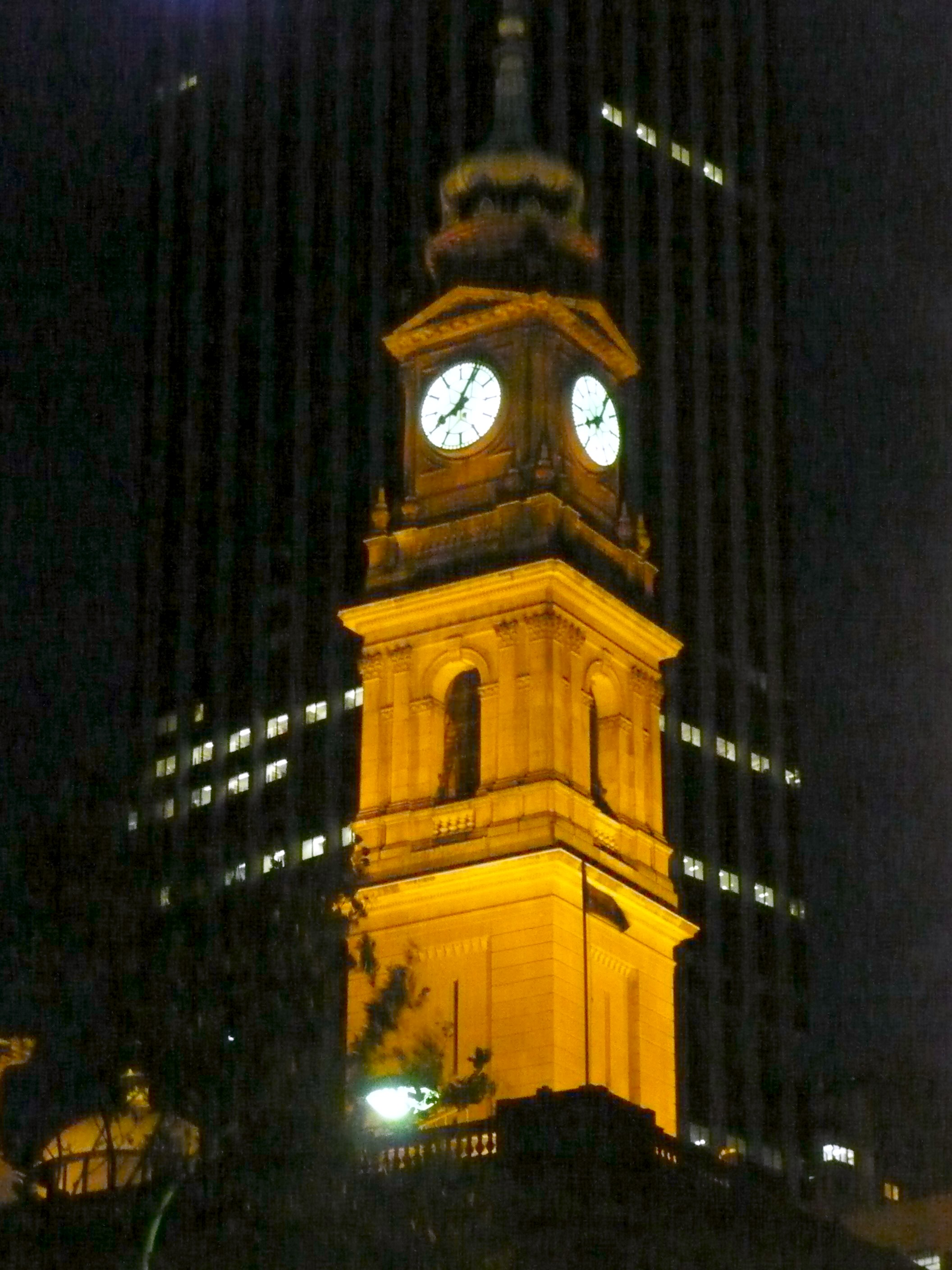
The clock tower at night

A damaged part of an exterior statue, now preserved inside the building

As at 3 November 2006, the building is one of the most outstanding surviving Victorian buildings in Sydney. The building has been used continuously for the purpose which it was designed for – as the administrative head office of Department of Lands. It has a long association with the public life of NSW, especially the rapid expansion of settlement during the later part of the 19th century. The building forms a visually satisfying enclosure to the southern side of Macquarie Place and relates in scale and materials to the other Government buildings at the eastern end of Bridge Street. A vital landmark in the history of surveying, land titles and public works in New South Wales.

Lands Department Building was listed on the New South Wales State Heritage Register on 2 April 1999 having satisfied the following criteria.

The place is important in demonstrating the course, or pattern, of cultural or natural history in New South Wales.

The Lands Department Building is one of the most influential and major public building ever established during the mid nineteenth century in Australia's colonial history. The responsibilities and duties of the Lands Department highlighted the important contributions that it has provided to the growth of the colony over the years. The style and scale of the building was considered to be equal to the public buildings that were constructed in the rest of the British Empire. Moreover, it provided a sense of pride amongst the citizens of Sydney and enabled many to connect with their European roots. The Lands Department Building also has associations with significant Australian figures including Surveyors General such as Sir Thomas Mitchell as well as prominent Australian architects such as James Barnet.

The place is important in demonstrating aesthetic characteristics and/or a high degree of creative or technical achievement in New South Wales.

The Lands Department Building is a landmark that is well known for its character due to its portrait statues on its facade. The building does also make a key contribution to Sydney's streetscapes as being "one of the most intact late Victorian-Edwardian" styles in the city. Barnet's unique building designs had drifted away from the traditional architectural styles found in earlier nineteenth century Sydney. His design plans had incorporated the use of majestic colonnades and verandas in view of the Australian climate.

The place has a strong or special association with a particular community or cultural group in New South Wales for social, cultural or spiritual reasons.

The building is an important heritage item that stems from early colonial times and is at present widely accepted by the public to be of historical significance. It is viewed as a structure that provides a sense of Australian identity. The Lands Department Building as well as other Neo-Classical architectures such as the General Post Office and the Chief Secretary's building symbolises not only the wealth of the nation, but also the pride of owning a structure that reflects their connection to the British Empire. The building is exceptionally impressive and is viewed as a place of historical interest attracting both tourists and locals alike.

== See also ==
- Australian non-residential architectural styles
- History of New South Wales
- History of Sydney
