= Capitol Theatre, Sydney =

Theatre in Sydney, Australia

Capitol Theatre
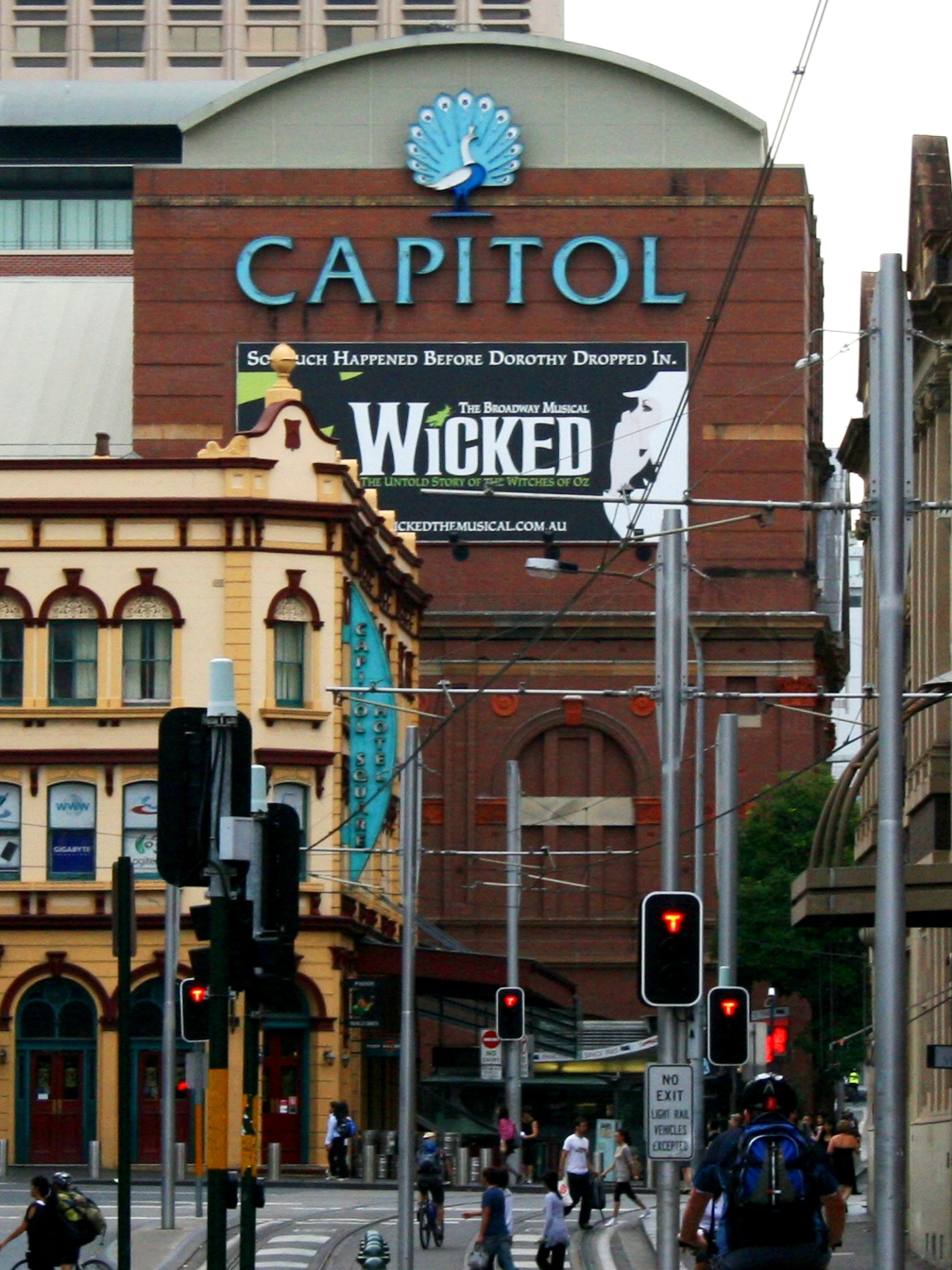

- Location in the Sydney central business district
- Location: 3–15 Campbell Street, Haymarket, Sydney central business district, City of Sydney, New South Wales, Australia
- Coordinates: 33°52′47″S 151°12′24″E
- Owner: Foundation Theatres
- Capacity: 2,094
- Type: Theatre
- Public transit: Capitol Square Light Rail

Construction
- Built: 1893–1928
- Opened: 1916
- Architects: Henry Eli White and John Eberson

Website
- www.capitoltheatre.com.au

New South Wales Heritage Register
- Official name: Capitol Theatre
- Type: State heritage (built)
- Designated: 2 April 1999
- Reference no.: 391
- Type: Theatre
- Category: Recreation and entertainment

The Capitol Theatre is a heritage-listed theatre located at 3–15 Campbell Street, Haymarket, in the Sydney central business district, Australia. It was designed by Henry Eli White and John Eberson and built from 1893 to 1928. The property was added to the New South Wales State Heritage Register on 2 April 1999. The former circus venue, atmospheric theatre and market venue is owned by Capitol Theatre Management Pty Limited, a wholly owned subsidiary of Foundation Theatres Pty Limited, which also owns the Sydney Lyric.

== History ==
The site of the Capitol Theatre has provided entertainment to the people of Sydney since the early 19th century when this piece of land was used by early settlers as a market place for produce and hay, giving this area its name "Haymarket". During the 1880s facilities for the bulk sale of fruit and vegetables came under increasing pressure. In March 1891, Sydney Council appointed a committee to recommend a new site for a major covered market. They suggested the adjacent space of the Haymarket and this proposal was adopted in the following July. The principal contractor for the building was Alexander Allen of Summer Hill and his tender of £24,902 was approved in November 1891. The markets opened in July 1893. The New Belmore Markets as it was called was designed by George McRae. The facade presented thirty-six arched bays to the streets: eleven to Campbell and Hay and seven to Parker and Pitt Streets.

The New Belmore Markets was not an economic success and led Council to seek alternative uses for the building. In 1912 the New Belmore Market was leased for ten weeks to Wirth Brothers for the purpose of a circus and hippodrome. Council decided to recycle the fabric of the New Belmore Market to create a theatrical circus venue. In September 1912, the Council accepted Wirth's tender for a twenty-one year lease of the proposed Hippodrome. The building initially functioned as a fruit and vegetable market called "Belmore Markets". The markets were built in 1891 by McRae, City Architect, and the structural engineer Norman Selfe, but were commercially unsuccessful because they were located too far from Darling Harbour. The markets relocated in 1912, after which Wirth Brothers took over the lease and opened their new Wirth Brothers Hippodrome in 1916. Attractions included elaborate circus acts with animals such as elephants and seals, theatre and vaudeville shows. Although performing with some success for a decade, the Hippodrome failed financially. The old site was divided up between the Manning Building (1895–1924), facing Pitt Street, and the western half, which was rebuilt as a theatre in 1928.

The conversion was under the control of Robert Hargreave Broderick. The facade was dismantled and re-erected above a new ground storey which was in turn mounted on the old footings. The redevelopment was split into two major contracts: the eastern half now known as the Manning Building was awarded to J. M. & A. Pringle in May 1913 and the Hippodrome theatre to the west to William Maston and Thomas Yates in December the same year. The Hippodrome finally opened in April 1916.

Despite the Hippodrome's versatility, it was not a financial success and by 1926 Wirth's had decided to seek the remodelling of the buildings as a picture palace. Plans for the work were completed by Henry Eli White in February 1927 for "Capitol Theatre Sydney Limited" and the same month Wirths wrote to the Sydney City Council requesting a "remodelling" of the building for its proposed new function. Henry White was a very experienced theatre designer and in 1927 visited America with Stuart Doyle, the managing director of Union Theatres Ltd., to review the latest developments in theatre design. Whilst in the United States, architect John Eberson was engaged to provide White with designs for the conversion of the Hippodrome. The plans for an atmospheric auditorium were very much like Eberson's Riviera at Omaha, Nebraska. The conversion involved remodelling the interior and raising the roof trusses to make room for the atmospheric ceiling and extended slope of the new gallery. In May 1927, the Sydney City Council approved Wirth's proposed alterations. The Capitol opened on 7 April 1928. In 1929 the theatre was fitted to screen talkies but by 1931–32 Greater Union was in financial difficulties with the Depression. In November 1932 the Capitol closed its doors.

It re-opened in April 1933 screening second-rate movies. Maintenance economies gradually put machinery and lighting out of action and in 1945 all "unwanted" decoration including banners, tapestries and artificial foliage was stripped from the interiors. In 1972 the theatre lease was removed from Greater Union Theatres and awarded to Harry M. Miller for the production of Jesus Christ Superstar. At that time the atmospheric and ornamental fabric was removed. During the 1990s the lease was transferred to Ipoh Garden Developments Pty Ltd. At this time the Capitol Theatre underwent a detailed restoration and reconstruction to recover the original 1928 experience. It has now been returned to its original grandeur.

== Description ==
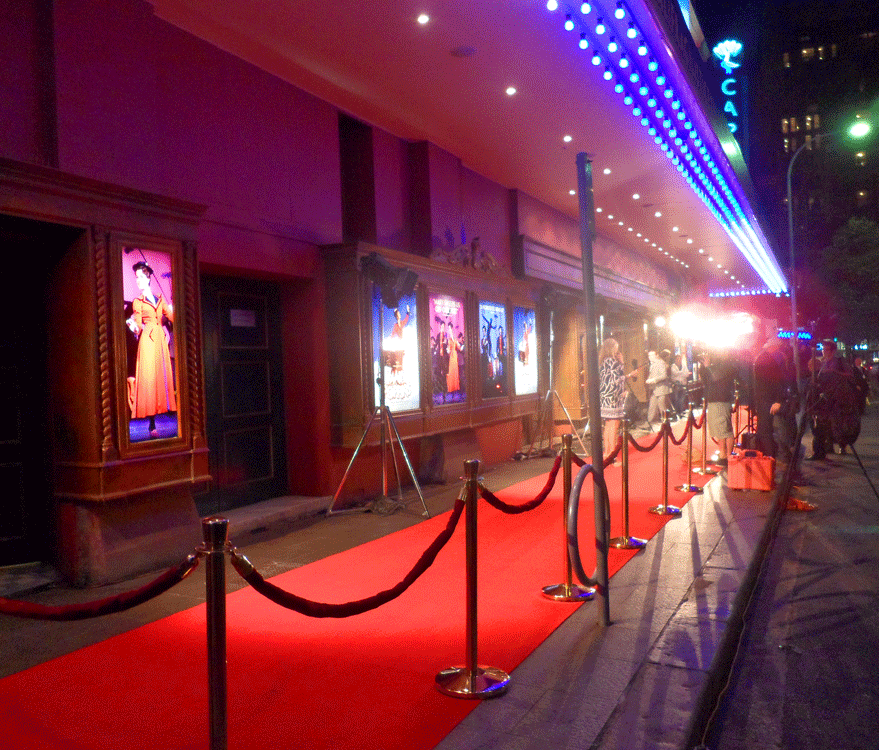
The red carpet outside the theatre entrance

A brick building with stone cornices, strings and other dressings, ornamental terracotta capitals, spandrils, rosettes etc. with tiles panels and into which was later built an atmospheric type plaster and brick picture palace.

The current theatre was designed by R. H. Broderick. It was intended as a hippodrome for arena theatre and featured stone cornices, terra-cotta capitals, rosettes and tiled panels. The architect Henry White turned the interior into a movie palace in 1927, creating the effect of an internal Italian garden or piazza. It also featured an internal imitation courtyard which is the only one surviving in Sydney. The building is listed on the Register of the National Estate. The Capitol Theatre was an "atmospheric" picture palace for many years, but went through a dark period in the 1970s and 1980s. In 1995, Capitol Theatre underwent a massive two-year reconstruction costing over $30 million.

=== Condition ===
As at 1 October 1997, the physical condition is excellent. The archaeological potential is low.

=== Modifications and dates ===
- 1893 – Belmore markets completed;
- 1913–1917 – redevelopment and conversion to Hippodrome;
- 1927–1928 – conversion to Capitol theatre;
- 1933–1972 – interiors gradually stripped;
- 1972 – atmospheric and ornamental fabric removed and altered;
- 1990s – restored and reconstructed.

== Productions ==
- 1972 – Jesus Christ Superstar (Australian premiere)
- 1982 – Iron Maiden (4 x)
- 1995 – West Side Story, Miss Saigon
- 1997 – West Side Story, Bruce Springsteen, Porgy and Bess, My Fair Lady
- 1998 – Stomp, Kylie Minogue, Jerry Seinfeld
- 1999 – Blondie, Billy Connolly, Chicago
- 2000 – Sting
- 2001 – Stars of the Bolshoi
- 2002 – The Royal Ballet
- 2003 – Hair, The Lion King
- 2005 – Fiddler on the Roof

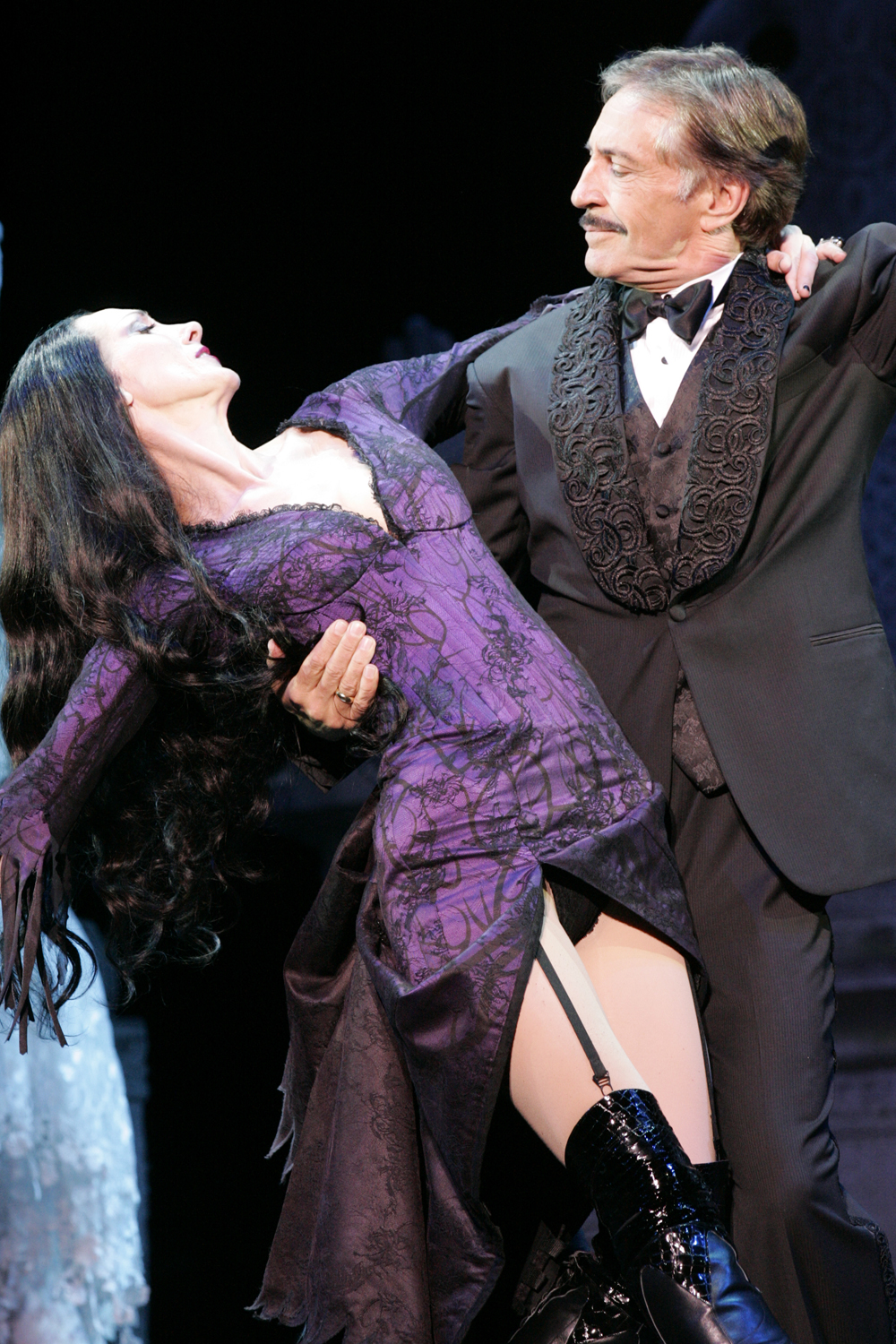
A musical version of The Addams Family was performed in 2013.

- 2006 – Diana Ross, Chris Isaak
- 2007 – Billy Crystal, Matthew Bourne's Swan Lake, Barry Humphries: Back with a Vengeance, Paris Opera Ballet, Billy Elliot the Musical (Australian premiere)
- 2008 – High School Musical on Stage!
- 2009 – Guys and Dolls, French & Saunders Farewell Tour, Seth MacFarlane, Wicked
- 2010 – Fame
- 2011 – Tap Dogs, The Boy From Oz, Riverdance, Mary Poppins
- 2012 – Love Never Dies, The Nutcracker on Ice, Barry Humphries: Eat, Pray, Laugh!, The Eifman Ballet: Anna Karenina and Tchaikovsky, Jose Feliciano, Paul Kelly: Conversations with Ghosts, Chitty Chitty Bang Bang
- 2013 – The Paris Opera Ballet: Giselle, The Addams Family, The Lion King
- 2014 – 2014 Helpmann Awards, Wicked
- 2015 – Swan Lake, Les Misérables, 2015 Helpmann Awards, Lord of the Dance, Cats, The Sound of Music
- 2016 – Fiddler on the Roof, Arj Barker: Get In My Head, The Imperial Bells of China, Cabaret de Paris, Aladdin (Australian premiere)
- 2017 – Kinky Boots, 2017 Helpmann Awards, My Fair Lady, Madama Butterfly, The Sleeping Beauty, Alice's Adventure in Wonderland, The Wizard of Oz
- 2018 – Mamma Mia!, Priscilla, Queen of the Desert, 2018 Helpmann Awards, Swan Lake on Ice, Stomp, Irish Celtic, Jersey Boys
- 2019 – Charlie and the Chocolate Factory (Australian premiere), Chicago, School of Rock
- 2020 – Anh Do: The Happiest Refugee Live! †, The Little Prince †, Penn & Teller †, Menopause The Musical †, Frozen (Australian premiere)
- 2021 – Come from Away
- 2022 – 9 to 5 (Australian premiere), Moulin Rouge!
- 2023 – Joseph and the Amazing Technicolor Dreamcoat, The Comedians, Beauty and the Beast
- 2024 – Alice's Adventures in Wonderland, Grease, Chicago, Sister Act (Australian premiere), Jesus Christ Superstar
- 2025 – Peter and the Starcatcher, Romeo and Juliet, Kitty Flanagan, Annie, The Book of Mormon
- 2026 – The Great Gatsby: A Jazz Ballet Odyssey, The Lion King, Dracula, The Nutcracker
- 2027 – Mrs. Doubtfire, Paddington: The Musical

Indicates current production
†Indicates the production was cancelled due to indoor event restrictions as part of the COVID-19 outbreak

== Transport ==
- Capitol Square light rail station
- Central railway station, Sydney

The closest train station is Central Station, it is approximately five minutes walk from the theatre. The closest light rail stop is Capitol Square, and is directly behind the Capitol Theatre.

== Heritage listing ==
As at 23 April 2001, the Capitol is the only atmospheric theatre to survive substantially intact in Australia. The structural fabric of the Capitol Theatre has a remarkable history of adaptation, reconstruction and restoration to accommodate changing uses. First, as the new Belmore Markets in 1892–93; then as a permanent circus venue (Hippodrome) for Wirth Brothers and an office and shopping block in 1913–16; finally in the conversion of the Hippodrome to an atmospheric theatre for Union Theatres Limited in 1927–28.

Capitol Theatre was listed on the New South Wales State Heritage Register on 2 April 1999 having satisfied the following criteria.

The place is important in demonstrating the course, or pattern, of cultural or natural history in New South Wales.

The structural fabric of the Capitol and Manning Buildings have a remarkable history of adaptation, reconstruction and restoration to accommodate changing uses. First, as the new Belmore Markets in 1892–93; then as a permanent circus venue (Hippodrome) for Wirth Brothers and an office and shopping block in 1913–16; finally in the conversion of the Hippodrome to an atmospheric theatre for Union Theatres Limited in 1927–28.

The place is important in demonstrating aesthetic characteristics and/or a high degree of creative or technical achievement in New South Wales.

The buildings now on the site: Watkins' terrace, the Capitol Theatre and the Manning Building, together with the adjacent former Commercial Bank and Corporation Building in Hay Street, form a largely nineteenth century enclave, modest in scale, homogenous in alignment and lively in detail, which makes it a precinct of considerable townscape quality.

The place possesses uncommon, rare or endangered aspects of the cultural or natural history of New South Wales.

The Capitol is the only atmospheric theatre to survive substantially intact in Australia.

== See also ==
- Sydney Lyric
- Foundry Theatre
