= Hay Street, Sydney =

Street in Sydney, Australia

Hay Street, Sydney New South Wales
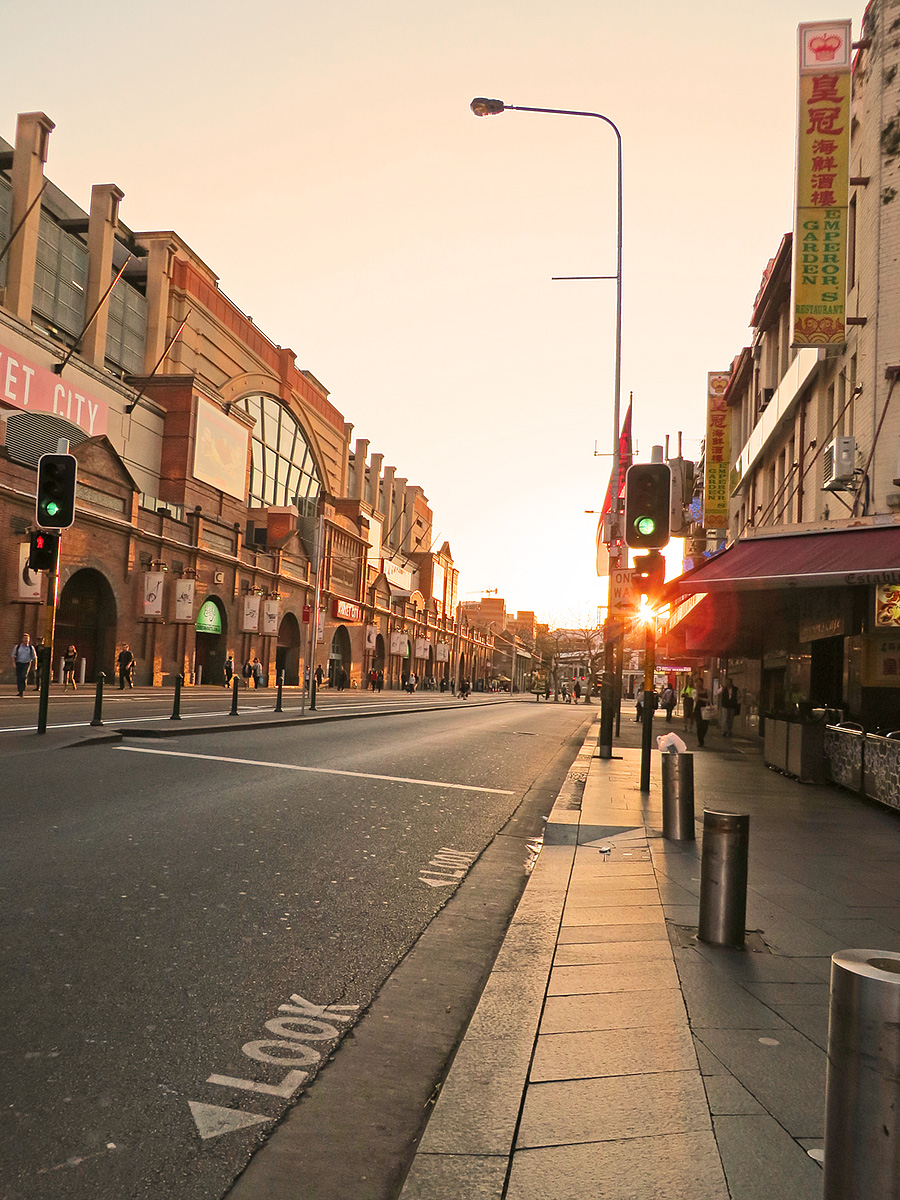
- Westbound view with Paddy's Markets to the left

General information
- Type: Street
- Length: 700 m (0.4 mi)

Major junctions
- Eastern end: Elizabeth Street; Sydney CBD
- Castlereagh Street; Pitt Street; George Street; Sussex Street
- Western end: Darling Drive; Haymarket

Location(s)
- LGA(s): City of Sydney
- Major suburbs: Sydney CBD; Haymarket

Hay Street is a 700 metre street in the Sydney central business district, New South Wales, Australia. It runs east to west from Elizabeth Street to Darling Drive. For much of its length it is traversed by the Inner West Light Rail line.

== Description ==
Hay Street's eastern terminus is at the junction of Elizabeth Street, with its western terminus at the junction with Darling Drive. After passing beneath the City Circle railway viaduct, it passes along the northern side of Belmore Park. At the intersection with Pitt Street, the Inner West Light Rail line cuts in having descended from Central station.

It then passes to the south of the Capitol Theatre to George Street where the Inner West Light Rail crosses the CBD and South East Light Rail. Passing through Haymarket, to the south of Chinatown and the north of Paddy's Markets, it then continues to Darling Drive.

In July 2004, part of Hay Street was closed to vehicle traffic.

== Notable buildings ==
- 181-187 Hay Street
- Capitol Theatre
- Paddy's Markets
