= Move FM =

Australian FM radio station

Lithgow, New South Wales, Australia; Australia
- Broadcast area: Lithgow RA1
- Frequency: 107.9 MHz FM

Programming
- Language: English
- Format: Contemporary hit radio

Ownership
- Owner: Midwest Radio Network
- Sister stations: 2LT

History
- First air date: 3 July 1939
- Former frequencies: 95.3 FM (1996–2004)

Technical information
- Repeater: 99.5 FM Wentworth Falls

Links
- Website: www.movefm.com.au

Move FM (ACMA callsign: 2ICE) is an Australian FM radio station serving the Lithgow region in the Central Tablelands of New South Wales. It was opened in 1996 as KISS 95.3.

== History ==
In 1996, Midwest Radio Network sought and was granted a licence to establish an FM radio station to complement 2LT. The company was granted a licence to broadcast on 95.3MHz and began operating as KISS 95.3. Later a frequency conflict with a Sydney station led to a change to 107.9 MHz and a name change. Finally in 2011, the station was renamed to MoveFM.

On 15 April 2004, Move FM's former frequency was auctioned for $106 million by the Australian Broadcasting Tribunal. In exchange the Tribunal awarded Midwest two licences for additional FM frequencies and areas, allowing it and sister station 2LT to extend coverage by operating repeater stations in the Blue Mountains. Various technical issues have delayed the activation of the translators, which are not expected to be fully operational until 2021.

== Programming ==
Weekdays

- The Morning Move (Weekdays, 06:00 to 09:00)
- The Move Music Marathon (Weekdays, 09:00 to 10:47)
- Kimbo's Big Lunch by request! (Weekdays, 12:00 to 13:00)
- Move Arvos with Kimbo (Weekdays, 13:00 to 16:00)
- Carrie & Tommy (Weekdays, 15:00 to 18:00)

Weekends

- Weekend Breakfast (Weekends, 06:00 to 10:00)
- Saturdays with Kimbo (Saturdays, 10:00 to 14:00)
- Sundays with Kimbo (Sundays, 10:00 to 14:00)
