= Argyle Hotel Group =

Australian hotel management company

- Type: Privately held company
- Industry: Hospitality
- Founded: 2002
- Founder: Kevin Zhang
- Headquarters: Sydney, Australia
- Number of locations: 141 (2019)
- Area served: Asia-Pacific
- Key people: Kevin Zhang (CEO)
- Products: Hotels
- Total assets: $4.2 billion (April 2019)
- Website: http://en.argylehotels.com

Argyle Hotel Management Group, Pty Ltd. is an Australian hotel management company that provides a series of hotel and resort management services. It also owns and operates a number of hotels in China and across the Asia-Pacific region, including Australia, and the Philippines. The group was ranked as the world's 59th largest hotel company for 2018 by HOTELS magazine.

== History ==
Argyle Hotel Group was founded in Perth, Australia in 2002 and began its operations in China in 2005. The company opened its first hotel, the Huagang Argyle, in Shanghai in 2007, followed by the Ausotel Dayu in Beijing in 2008. In 2014, the group launched its brand Ausotel as a mid-range international-standard hotel line, which would become the focus of its expansion in China.

In January 2019, GreenTree Hospitality Group Ltd. entered into a share purchase agreement to become a major shareholder of Argyle Hotel Group.

The name Argyle comes from the Argyle diamond mine in Western Australia the source of a rare pink diamond found only in Australia

== Businesses and operations ==
The hotel management services provided by Argyle include hotel consignment management, franchising operations, consulting services, and hotel management education and training. The group also operates a branded training program named Argyle Academy, which offers hospitality services training at the Tourism College of Bohai University, Shuigang Senior Technical School and Zunyi Intermediate Vocational School.

=== Brands ===
The company maintains a retail brand called Bondi Shack, to market Australian-made products to its customers. In addition to an e-commerce platform for ordering, several Argyle hotels host Bondi Shack boutique stores where consumers may interact with products.

=== China expansion strategy ===
After entering China in 2005, Argyle identified a lack of international-standard hotels in China’s regional second- and third-tier cities. To gain first-mover advantage in these markets, the company worked with Austrade to develop connections with provincial governments and local hotel developers. In 2009, Argyle signed a 13-year hotel management contract with a developer in Jinsha, Guizhou Province. To preserve its quality and management standards, Argyle established its Argyle Academy training programs. In 2016 the Company introduced its Bondi Shack brand to market Australian-made products to Chinese consumers. In 2019 Argyle signed an agreement with Australia Post as a provider of order management, logistics and distribution services for the Bondi Shack e-commerce platform.

== Awards ==
- 57th Australian Export Awards - Business Services Award (2017, Finalist)
- AustCham Westpac Australia-China Business Awards - Business Excellence Award for Services (2016)
- China-Australia Chamber of Commerce - WestPac Business Excellence Award for Large Business (2013, Finalist)
- Australia-China Business Awards - WestPac Special Recognition Award (2013)
