= Metro Hotels =

Australian hotel chain

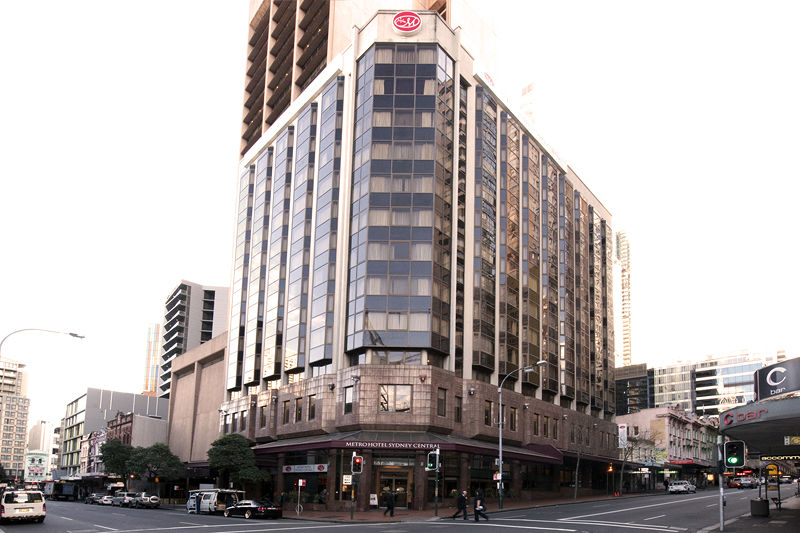
- Metro Hotel Marlow, Sydney
- Trade name: Metro Hotels
- Type: Public
- Traded as: ASX: TCO
- ISIN: TCO
- Industry: Hospitality
- Genre: Hotel chain
- Founded: 1976
- Founder: John McEvoy
- Fate: Active
- Headquarters: Sydney, Australia
- Number of locations: 8 (2026)
- Area served: Worldwide
- Key people: John McEvoy (Chair); Peter Frawley (Managing Director)
- Services: Accommodation
- Revenue: $27,467,715 (AUD) (2026)
- Number of employees: 200+ (2026)
- Parent: Transmetro Corporation Limited
- Divisions: Metro Hotels Metro Hospitality Group
- Website: metrohotels.com.au

Metro Hotels is an Australian hotel chain founded in 1976. The company is owned by Transmetro Corporation Limited and overseen by Metro Hospitality Group, a trading division of Transmetro Corporation. Metro Hotels operates 15 hotels and 2 pubs at multiple locations in Australia. The company is the oldest fully Australian owned hotel chain and has been traded on the Australian Securities Exchange since 1987. Metro Hotels is in a strategic partnership with Argyle Hotel Group. The company is currently headquartered in Sydney, Australia.

== History ==
Metro Hotels was founded in 1976 in Sydney, by John McEvoy who is the current chairman of the company and has served as the chairman and the managing director of Transmetro Corporation Limited since 1979. Metro Hotels is the main trading entity of The Metro Hospitality Group, the operating arm of Transmetro Corporation. From 2007 to 2015, George Bedwani served as the chief operating officer of the company. Peter Frawley joined in 2015, following George Bedwani's retirement, and is the current managing director of the company. The company operates 8 hotels in Sydney, 2 hotels in Gladstone, 1 each in Ipswich, Perth, Darwin and Groote Eylandt with 2 pubs in Adelaide and Sydney. In 2007, Metro Hotels entered into a marketing alliance with Argyle Hotel Group, an Australian hotel management company operating an extensive range of hotels in China. The group is also a participant in the Qantas Frequent Flyer program.

Metro Hotels came into business in the mid-1970s with acquisitions of three hotels including the Metro Inn Edgecliff on New South Head Road in 1976, Metro Hotel Miranda in the Sutherland Shire, in 1978, and Metro Inn Ryde on Victoria Road in 1977. Metro Hotels also operated the landmark Canberra Rex Hotel in Canberra for a period until 1988. President of the United States, Lyndon Johnson stayed at the Canberra Rex Hotel during his visit to Australia in 1966. In 1988, the Canberra Rex Hotel was sold to a company associated with Millie Phillips.

In 1994, Metro Hotels took over the operations of The Tower Mill Hotel in Brisbane. At the time of acquisition, the hotel was already 28 years old. The Tower Mill Hotel was redeveloped by Gorman Property in July 1994. It was the scene of protests and demonstration against the South African apartheid regime and the Springboks who were touring Australia for rugby matches and were staying at The Tower Mill. One of the student protesters, Peter Beattie, went on to become the Premier of Queensland. The events of 1971 inspired the book called The Tower Mill by James Moloney. The Tower Mill Hotel was considered to be one of Brisbane's most innovative buildings and in 2007, The Courier-Mail described the hotel as a no-frills tower of strength. In May 2018, Metro Hotels sold its interest in The Tower Mill Hotel to Interstay.

In 2009, Metro Hotels contemplated to build a $20 million, 170-room, four-star hotel in Auckland, New Zealand on the site where a brothel operated. However, due to the 2008 financial crisis, the plan never materialized. In 2011, Metro Hotels acquired a pub in Haymarket, New South Wales which was originally called the Palace and was opened in 1877. The company changed its name from Paddy McGuires Pub to Yardhouse Bar and Brasserie. Metro Hotels soon received notice from Yardhouse, a theme pub operator in the United States, that it had an Australian registered trademark in Australia for the Yardhouse name. Metro Hotels renamed the hotel The Palace since 1877.

In 2014, Metro Hotels joined with an estimated two thirds of hotels across Australia to cut back services over Easter because of Australia's high penalty rates. The industry move was attacked by the head of the Australian hospitality union, who described it as "an attack on Australian values and the Australian way of life". Until 2017, Metro Hotels operated two hotels on Pitt Street, a major street in Sydney. One of the hotels, The four star Metro Hotel on Pitt, which the company had operated since 2003, was closed in September 2017 to make way for a station for the Sydney Metro.

== Locations ==
Hotel	City
Metro Hotel Marlow	Sydney
Metro Aspire	Sydney
Metro Apartments Darling Harbour	Sydney
Metro Apartments on King	Sydney
Metro Hotel Miranda	Sydney
Metro Inn Ryde	Sydney
Metro Mirage Hotel	Sydney
Palace Hotel since 1877	Sydney
Metro Apartments on Bank Place	Melbourne
Metro Hotel Ipswich International	Ipswich
Metro Hotel & Apartments Gladstone	Gladstone
Apartments G60	Gladstone
Metro Hotel Perth	Perth
Metro Advance Apartments & Hotel	Darwin
Groote Eylandt Lodge	Groote Eylandt
The Elephant British Pub	Adelaide

- _{Source:- Australian Government Business Register}
