= 2LT (AM) =

- Lithgow, New South Wales; Australia
- Frequency: 900 kHz

Programming
- Language: English
- Format: Classic Hits

Ownership
- Owner: Midwest Radio Network Pty Ltd
- Sister stations: Move FM

History
- First air date: 3 July 1939
- Former frequencies: 1080 kHz AM (1939–1952) 1370 kHz AM (1952–1978) 1395 kHz AM (1978–1984)
- Call sign meaning: 2 for New South Wales plus LT for Lithgow

Technical information
- Licensing authority: ACMA
- ERP: 56 kW
- Repeater: 101.1 FM Wentworth Falls

Links
- Public licence information: Profile
- Website: 2LT

2LT is an Australian AM radio station based in Lithgow and serving the Central West, and Blue Mountains regions of New South Wales. It was opened in July 1939.

== History ==
Established in July 1939 by Lithgow Broadcasters Pty Ltd., Radio 2LT broadcast from studios located on the Great Western Highway in Bowenfels, before relocating in 1974 to a purpose built facility at 289 Main St, Lithgow where it remains to this day. The station operated as part of Macquarie's Central Western Network and broadcast the network's programming as well as local content. In 1980 2LT became the first regional station in Australia to achieve multiple national broadcast industry awards.

On 30 September 1984 the station radically retooled, changing frequency from 1395 kHz to 900AM and call sign to 'Radio 90' to reflect the dial repositioning and the expansion of the service into the broader Central West region. At the time the company's name was changed from Lithgow Broadcasters Pty Ltd to Midwest Radio Network. The station returned to the original call sign by way of a transitional presentation 'Radio 90 2LT' in 1989, with full restoration of the 2LT moniker by late 1990. From 1997 the Main Street Lithgow facility has also housed a supplementary FM station, which began life as KISS 95.3. In August 2002 2LT and the FM supplementary licence changed hands and then went into administration.

In 2005, KISS would change frequency to 107.9 FM to accommodate for the pending launch of Sydney station Vega 95.3, and changed its name accordingly. In 2011 it changed its name again to Move FM.

In 2011 the original proprietor, now operating as Midwest Radio Network, took back control over the stations.

2LT began broadcasting in the Blue Mountains in 2015 on 101.1 FM but on limited power. The station is still negotiating technical specifications with the Australian Media Communications Authority before launching officially. The translator service is not expected to be fully operational until some time in 2027.

== Presenters ==
=== Current ===
- Bob Barnsley (Drive Weekdays, Saturdays 6am–12 noon)
- Pete Watson (Breakfast)
- Mark Levy (Weekdays, 9–12 noon)

=== Former ===
- Chris Kearns, John Tapp, Brian Bury, Tom Crozier, Daryl Egan , Garry Carr, Pete Johns, Craig Willis, Gary Daly, Ray Veldrie, Peter Graham, Ted Bull, Mal Hedstrom, Kevin O'Neill, John Cahill, Rob Mclean, Darryl MacGlashan, Warren Purchase, Barry Egan, Mark Jensen, Rob (Tesoriero) Hartley, Alan Oloman, Nick Bennett, Jenny Eather, Trevor Langlands, Michele Menchin, Jennifer Menchin, Marvin (Mark) Bemand, Drew Michel, Jack Wallace, Pete Diskon, Tim Trevor-Jones, Rob Kendall, Jodie Haigh, Frank Harper, Neville Pellitt, Reg Cowden, Sam Laws, Warren Atkinson, Craig Ross, Chris Gregson, Nik James, Bob Barnsley, Digby Gillings, Bede Leighton, Chris Dover, Tracey Cowden, Wayne Clark, Jason Bouman, George Frame, Dan Garlick, Steve Carline, Matt Pardy, Rob Jolly, Margaret Sewell, Stu Gary, Pete Watson,Paul Wise, Mike Worthy, Rupert Grech, Lindsay Lawson, Connie Torelli, Fiona Cameron, Ben Hogan, Sue Badham, Joel Helmes, Geoff Brown, Jan Jefferey, Matt Ponsonby, Ian Kelly, Donn Berghofer, Greg Robson, Doug Keith, Pete Little, Janet Miles, David Anderson, Dave Robertson, Ron Lincoln, Tony Guiffre, Paul Hussey, Dave Levy, Greg Walker, Anna-Louise Cheetham, Dani Bellamy, Steve Owens, Glen Comrie, Craig Denyer, Mark Blake (Marvin Bemand), Olivia Nelmes, Al Kirton and Craig Baynham.
