= Thai Town, Sydney =

Neighborhood in New South Wales, Australia

Thai Town ไทยทาวน์ซิดนีย์ (Thai)
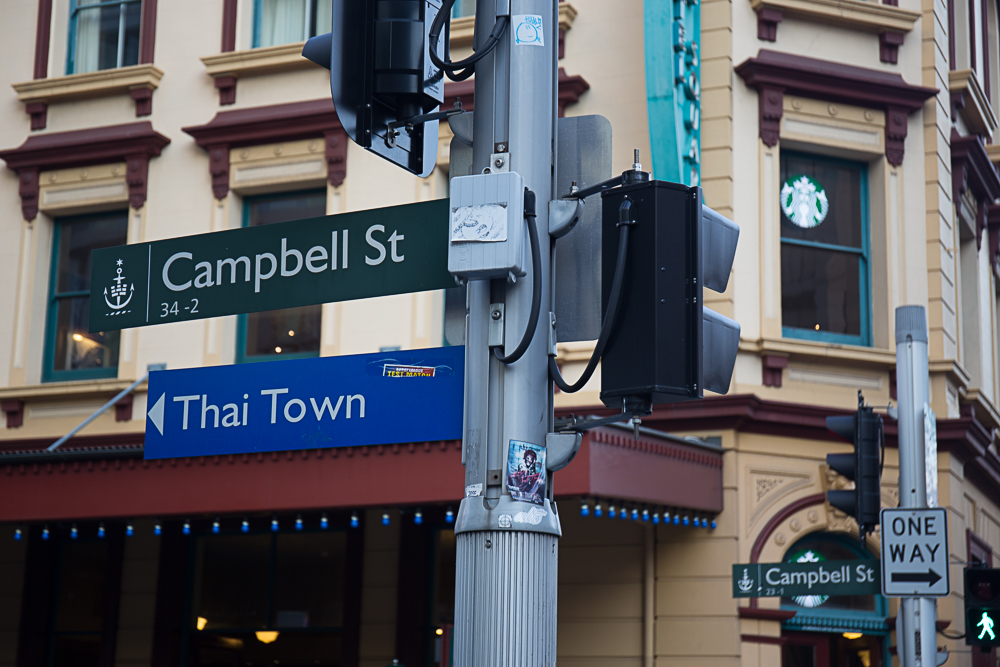
- Thai Town street marker in 2015
- Interactive map of Thai Town
- Country: Australia
- State: New South Wales
- City: Sydney
- LGA: City of Sydney

Government
  - State electorate: Sydney
  - Federal division: Sydney
Localities around Thai Town
Ultimo	Sydney CBD	Sydney CBD
Chinatown	Thai Town	Sydney CBD
Haymarket	Haymarket	Haymarket

Thai Town (Note: Thai: ไทยทาวน์ซิดนีย์ or ไทยทาวน์) is a neighbourhood in Sydney central business district in Australia with a high concentration of Thai businesses. It is located in Haymarket on Campbell Street, to the east of George Street, close to Central railway station. It is the second largest of its kind in the world behind Thai Town, Los Angeles. In 2007, Sydney had the highest population of Thais in Australia, with a growing population of around 100,000. Around 17.5 per cent of people who live in the suburb of Haymarket were born in Thailand, according to the 2021 Australian census. Thai Town contains many Thai restaurants, video stores, grocery stores, salons and other businesses.

Thai Town was established in the 1990s as since rent was relatively affordable, and because it provided a source for Thai speciality foods, many Thai businesses moved into the area. In 2013, the area was officially recognised by the City of Sydney and given signage to indicate the hub's location on Campbell Street. Chinatown and Koreatown are adjacent to Thai Town.

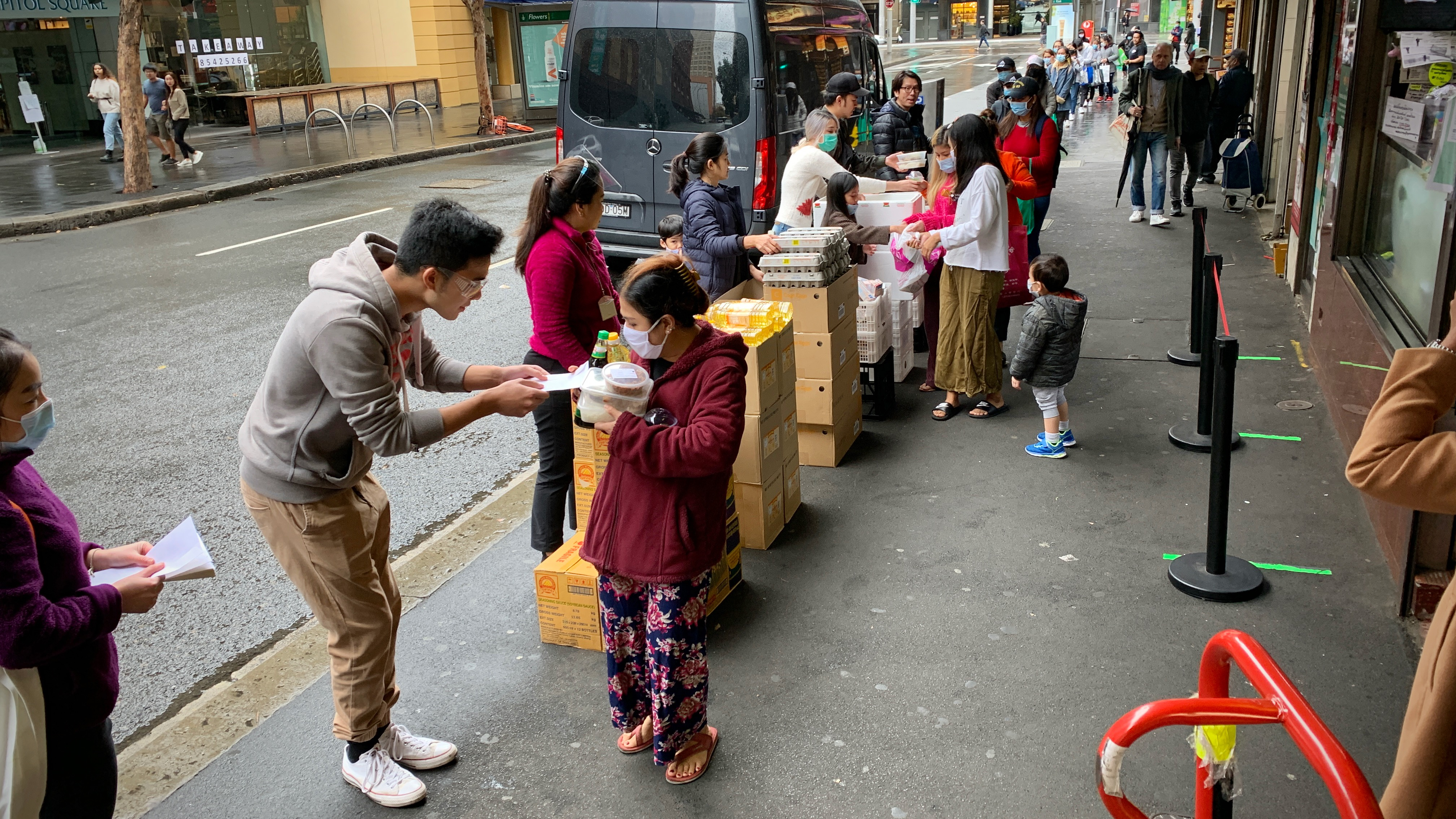
Charity event in Thai Town during the COVID-19 pandemic, 2020

== History ==
Pontip Walpolehad arrived in Australia from Thailand in 1974, and after a stay in Denmark, spent her time in Coffs Harbour in 1977 before moving to Sydney. In Sydney, she began supplying Thai ingredients to most of Sydney's Thai restaurants before establishing a Thai grocery store called 'Pontip' in modern-day Thai Town in 1991. She would go on to sell the store in 2012 before dying on 6 March 2020. The Australian Broadcasting Corporation describes Pontip's store as the unofficial 'foundation stone of the city's Thai Town'. In the 1990s, several more Thai restaurants opened around Pontip, also drawn by the area's relatively cheap rent. An additional factor behind the growth of Thai Town was the influx of international students from Thailand to New South Wales from 3,500 in 2000 to 16,500 in 2014. A few of these students then established their own businesses such as massage parlours, currency exchange outlets, clothing stores, and video shops. This in turn attracted more Thai students who felt more comfortable living in a setting that reminded them of Thailand.

In her May 2012 visit to Australia, Thai Prime Minister Yingluck Shinawatra made a visit to Thai Town. This led to the Thai consulate-general to begin pushing for the establishment of an officially recognised Thai Town. In October 2013, the area was officially recognised by the City of Sydney who approved the installation of three street signs denoting Thai Town. They were erected at the corners of George and Campbell Streets, Pitt and Campbell Streets, and Pitt and Goulburn Streets. The Sydney Thai Town thus became the second recognised Thai Town in the world after Los Angeles recognised there's in 1999. On the significance of the City's recognition, the Thai consul-general Biravij Suwanpradhes said it gave Thais an "identity" within Sydney.

In 2016, the organisations Thai Community Association and Thai Town Business were incorporated.

Following the COVID-19 pandemic, the City of Sydney announced in 2023 funding of $44 million to the Haymarket area, with some of funding going to Thai Town. The funding is to allow local businesses in the area to celebrate their cultural heritage.

== Culture ==
Most of Thai Town's groceries sell Thai newspapers and magazines, including the English language Bangkok Post. In 2014, there were four newspapers and magazines distributed around Thai Town: Huahom, Thai-Oz News, Thai Press, and VR-Thai. Natui TV is a Thai news website established by Amy Chanta in Thai Town. The website is designed for Thais moving to or in Australia.

The Thai Consulate in Sydney organises annual concerts performed by Thai singers; while bars and pubs around Thai Town sometime features Thai rock and pop music. Many Thai festivals, such as the Songkran Festival (Thai New Year) held every April, are celebrated in Thai Town. In 2015, the first Thai Town Lunar Street Festival was held to provide an opportunity to showcase Thai cuisine.

Within the broader 'Asian Town' of Sydney, businesses and community members of Thai Town often interact and engage with individuals and businesses located in the adjacent Koreatown and Chinatown. This cooperation extends to cultural events such as Chinese New Year festivals.
