= Hydraulic Pump Station =

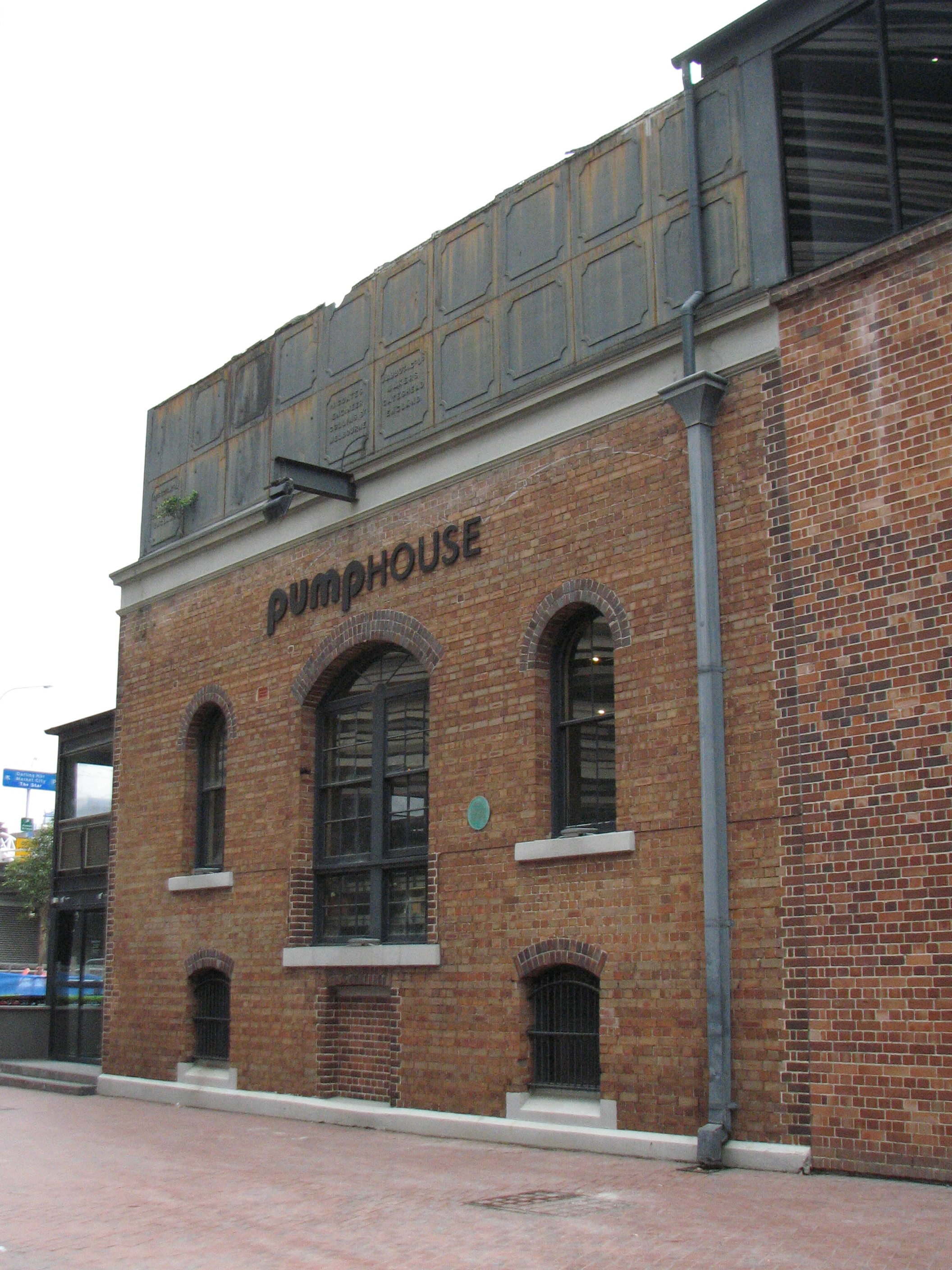
- Hydraulic Pump Station, 17 Little Pier Street, Haymarket, NSW

- Location within Sydney Location within Australia
- 33.8775°S 151.2022°E
- Location: 17 Little Pier Street, Haymarket, New South Wales, Australia

History
- Built: 1889–1891

Site notes
- Owner: Sydney Harbour Foreshore Authority

New South Wales Heritage Register
- Official name: Hydraulic Pump Station (former); Hydraulic Pump Station
- Type: state heritage (built)
- Designated: 2 April 1999
- Reference no.: 125
- Type: Water Pump House/Pumping Station
- Category: Utilities - Water

The Hydraulic Pump Station is a heritage-listed former hydraulic power station and now bar at 17 Little Pier Street, Haymarket, New South Wales,Sydney, Australia. It was built from 1889 to 1891.

== History ==
Erected in 1889 by the Hydraulic Power Company, the pumping station is of technological significance as the centre for the now abandoned city hydraulic power network. This network was crucial to the dock, warehouse and other commercial development of Sydney. It is a substantial contributor to the townscape quality of the Haymarket Conservation Area, with its substantial and picturesque Italianate facade.

At the end of the 19th century, before electric motors were perfected, the principal sources of power for industry and commerce were steam engines, some gas engines and hydraulic pressures. A public system of high pressure hydraulic power was introduced to Sydney in 1891. Before that several privately owned hydraulic systems were operating hoists and lifts.

The effect of the introduction of hydraulically powered lifts on the architecture of Sydney was dramatic. Commercial, residential and warehouse buildings could now be constructed up to eight storeys high instead of the usual three of four. Builders were quick to seize on the new technology and use it to meet the mounting commercial pressure for more buildings on less land.

The Sydney and Suburban Hydraulic Power Company was established in 1889 and built the pumping station in Pier St which was completed in 1891. By 1926 the Company's operations had expanded and the more efficient electric lifts were being installed and maintained by them in many of Sydney's buildings. The company then became the 'Hydraulic Power Electric and Hydraulic Lifts Ltd.'

In 1955 the company, in an attempt to prevent a takeover by the Council of the City of Sydney, split into Elevators Pty Ltd and Hydraulic Power Pty Ltd. These two companies were taken over by Lendlease in 1960.

The Pier St station was the first and largest pumping station in Sydney. It was sited between the central business district and wool presses of Pyrmont and Ultimo wool stores. It provided water at 800psi in an area bounded by Broadway, the Pyrmont wharves, Circular Quay, and the eastern end of Cowpers Wharf Road.

Water for the system was tapped initially from the city water supply. However, as demand for service increased this became too expensive and a dam was constructed on 4ha of land near Mount Rennie, which is now the Moore Park Golf Course. This dam was increased in size from 2.8 million litres to 4.5 million litres and water was pumped by the low pressure Waterloo Pumping Station to the Pier Street Pumping Station reservoir. High pressure water from the Pier Street Station was pumped through 30 km of 150mm and 100mm high pressure mains to operate many of the lifts, hoists, cranes, bank doors and wool dumping presses scattered throughout the city.

By the 1920s hydraulic pumping sub-stations had been erected at Cowpers Wharf Road, Woolloomooloo and Pyrmont to cope with the increased demand, principally from the wool presses. In 1926 the Waterloo pumping station was converted from steam to electricity and the first change in the Company's name occurred.

The demand for power increased steadily to 250 million litres/year. In 1952 the steam plant was replaced by electric pumps to try and meet this demand. The growth of the number of lifts and hoists operated by hydraulic power increased steadily from 1891 to the 1920s when electrically powered lifts became pre-eminent. From the 1920s most new buildings had electric lifts installed as hydraulic lifts were seldom suitable for more than four or five stories and the number of lifts remained relatively static. However, the increased use of hydraulic lifts already in place lead to a steady increase in the amount of water consumed up until the late 1950s.

There was a steady decline in the demand for hydraulic services from the commencement of the 1950s building boom. There was also a need to upgrade much of the plant. Consequently, operations ceased 1975 The shutdown of the system in 1975/6 was when Pyrmont Street Ultimo was extended from Fig Street to Quarry Street (as part of the North Western Freeway Construction) and the hydraulic power main which was under the railway line serving the Bond Store (Cnr Fig and Pyrmont Streets) was broken during the road construction (unaware it was a live power main). At the time the users on the clip board in the Pump Station indicated 7 active users – one was the Jacoby Mitchel building - Sussex and Druitt Street (the plaque “Built by The Sydney Hydraulic and General Engineering Coy Ltd Lift No 967” was on the wall of the lift car. The employee at the time was under KPMG the liquidators. . The high pressure water supply was discontinued in sections.

It appears that the interior of the building was renovated after 1975, with the basement and access to the base of the accumulators covered by a new floor. The original staircase which led to a platform on the head of the accumulators and gave access to the roof has been demolished, presumably at the same date.

By 1988 the building had become a microbrewery and a hotel, the entrance had been realigned with a balcony and verandah attached and the interior massively renovated.

In 1999-2000 the interior of the building was again renovated and the microbrewery removed. The balcony and verandah were changed and the rear of the building was joined to a large new hotel complex.

In 2018, the building operates as Pumphouse Bar and Restaurant.

== Description ==
The Hydraulic Pump Station is a three-storey Italianate/Baroque facade with rich decorative plaster/stucco elements. It features detailing includes matching pairs of pedimented dummy windows with square Corinthian pilasters flanking a central arched window on each storey, also with Corinthian pilasters plus stucco moulding and keystone. The arched windows are repeated on the second storey sides, below a circular vent, also with stucco moulding. The ground storey features stucco quoins which extend on the eastern side to simulate ashlar masonry on the facade on an extension which also features ornate Italianate plasterwork. The facade third story of the accumulator house rests on a corbelled string course and consists of a returning balustrade, punctuated by impressive pillar and stylised pediment which reads in relief "SYDNEY SUBURBAN HYDRAULIC POWER ESTD COMPANY 1889".

The building still houses two accumulator cylinders. The walls are massive load-bearing brick with a riveted iron girder and timber ceiling. The Engine House behind and adjacent to the accumulator house, supports a huge cast iron water tank on massive load bearing brick walls and a double row of large riveted iron box girders. The facade, like the accumulator house is Italianate with ornate stucco decoration, an arcade of arched windows. The water tank is constructed of large square cast iron plates with raised circular and diagonal strengthening ridges on the interior. Cast inscriptions on two of the plates on the tank read "J COATES ENGINEER COLLINS STREET MELBOURNE" and "J ABBOT & CO LD MAKERS GATESHEAD ENGLAND". The building has been realigned, the entrance is now from the original southern wall and a balcony and verandah have been constructed on it.

As at 15 October 2002, The exterior of the building was in excellent condition as at 15 October 2002, although the renovation and realignment of the entrance obscures some of the features of the facade. The interior of the building has been renovated but substantial original features remain. The floor of the building has been renewed, a new concrete mezzanine which has no relationship with the original open space has been added and access to the base of the accumulators and the basement has been removed. However, there could be significant archaeological potential.

The building facade, internal walls, roof, hydraulic accumulators and the largest cast iron water tank in Sydney still survive and are sympathetically incorporated to the renovation of the building as a pub.

== Heritage listing ==
Hydraulic Pumping Station No.1 played a pivotal role in the industrial, commercial and architectural development of Sydney. As the city's first and major public provider of hydraulic power, it has strong historical associations with many prominent buildings and firms. The elegant structure of the remaining building is one of the very few industrial landmarks remaining in this part of the city.

Hydraulic Pump Station was listed on the New South Wales State Heritage Register on 2 April 1999 having satisfied the following criteria.

The place is important in demonstrating the course, or pattern, of cultural or natural history in New South Wales.

Pier St Number One Pumping Station was the first public hydraulic pumping station to commence operations in Sydney. The success of this station led to the widespread acceptance and use of hydraulic power. The station was directly associated with the development of may prominent Sydney firms. The station was also directly associated with the construction of many prominent Sydney buildings. The provision of hydraulic power from this station was an important contributing factor in the operations of the Pyrmont and Darling Harbour woolstores and the wool boom of the 1890s. Hydraulic power led directly to changes in the building industry which permanently altered the city profile. The station continued to provide an essential service to the city for nearly a century.

The place is important in demonstrating aesthetic characteristics and/or a high degree of creative or technical achievement in New South Wales.

Pier St Number One Pumping Station was the first and largest hydraulic pumping station to be built in Sydney. The station represents the arrival of a new technology which had a major impact on the building industry by furthering the construction of multi-storey buildings. It contains the largest extant set of hydraulic accumulators and the largest cast iron water tank in Sydney. The building structure in the engine house shows an unusual small scale application of massive load bearing brick wall and riveted iron girder technology. The accumulator house facade shows, in its picturesque Italianate elevations, an elegant nineteenth century approach to the decoration of a purpose built industrial structure.

The place has a strong or special association with a particular community or cultural group in New South Wales for social, cultural or spiritual reasons.

The advent of hydraulic power altered forever the conditions and environment of Sydney's office workers. The pumping station is a well known landmark at the southern end of the city. Pier St Pumping Station is, today, the last major vestige of a suite of industrial structures in and around Darling Harbour. It is therefore of major social interest as the principal tangible evidence of the area's industrial history.

The place has potential to yield information that will contribute to an understanding of the cultural or natural history of New South Wales.

The history of the site is well documented, particularly its steam operations. Together with the surviving fabric, these records provide an invaluable resource for explaining hydraulic technology.

The place possesses uncommon, rare or endangered aspects of the cultural or natural history of New South Wales.

Pier St Number One Pumping Station was the first and largest hydraulic pumping station to be built in Sydney. It is the last major vestige of the industrial history of Darling Harbour.

The place is important in demonstrating the principal characteristics of a class of cultural or natural places/environments in New South Wales.

Pier St Number One Pumping Station is representative of the important role of hydraulic power in developing the architecture and industry in Sydney. It was the first and the largest public hydraulic pumping station built in Sydney.
