= Midwest Radio Network =

Australian media company

Midwest Radio Network Pty Ltd
- Type: Limited company
- Industry: Digital media, News media & Broadcasting
- Founded: 1938
- Headquarters: Sydney, Australia
- Area served: Worldwide
- Key people: Barbara Orr (Radio)
- Products: Media & entertainment
- Services: Online newspapers, Digital newspaper, Radio broadcasting
- Website: midwestradionetwork.com

Midwest Radio Network is an Australian media company that focuses on broadcasting and digital media. The broadcasting division focuses on the operation of FM and AM commercial radio stations in the Midwest region, west of Sydney. The digital media platform comprising newspaper-style news portals is internationally concentrated.

== Overview ==
Midwest Radio Network was founded on 7 June 1938 as Lithgow Broadcasters Pty Ltd and was granted a license to transmit that year. Initially the company was a subsidiary of Western Newspapers Pty Ltd. In July 1939 the company began broadcasting with the channel name 2LT as part of the Macquarie Central Western Network.

In the 1970s the company was acquired by the Transcontinental Broadcasting Company Limited. This in turn was bought by Broadcast Investments Pty Limited, the former owner of 2UE, in 1979. Late in 1979 Lithgow Broadcasters was transferred to interests associated with John McEvoy of the Metro Hotels group.

On 21 June 1984 the company changed its name to Midwest Radio Network Pty Ltd, and in 1986 became a major shareholder in a new Australian Securities Exchange listed public company called Midwest Radio Limited. Midwest Radio Limited was involved in a number of ventures during the 1980s and 1990s, including regional radio stations in New Zealand and FM broadcasting operations in the United Arab Emirates, Qatar and Bahrain.

In 1996 Midwest Radio Network established a new FM station which launched with the call sign Kiss FM, which it began operating in conjunction with 2LT, and servicing a similar coverage area.

In 2001 Midwest Radio Network cut most of its connections with Midwest Radio Limited when that company was taken over in a reverse takeover by Unitel, a former listed public company whose principal asset was a network of radio stations jointly owned with Rural Press Limited comprising River 94.9 in Ipswich, Queensland, and South Australian stations 5AU Port Augusta, 5RM in Renmark, 5CC Port Lincoln, 5CS in Port Pirie, Magic FM in Port Lincoln, and Magic FM in Renmark. Subsequently, the name of the public company was changed to Media Corporation Australia Limited.. Control of the radio assets had passed to MCA and Midwest Radio Network was now concentrating on online news portals.

However, in March 2006 Media Corporation Australia went into liquidation and asked Midwest Radio Network to appoint a receiver for the radio assets. Both stations were offered for sale but no buyers emerged. Four years later Midwest Radio Network terminated the receivership and resumed control of the radio stations.

== History ==
=== Early days ===
After the license to establish 2LT was granted to Midwest Radio Network (then named Lithgow Broadcasters Pty Ltd) in 1938 it was proposed a trade union lease the license on a ten-year term basis, and for the union, the Professional Radio Employees Institute, to build and own the station, a first for a union in Australia. The proposal did not eventuate and Midwest proceeded to develop the station, building a transmitting aerial and a studio at Bowenfels. The station was to broadcast 10 hours a day initially.

=== Mast collapse ===
A contract for the erection of the tubular steel aerial mast, which was to be 218 feet in height was entered into in January 1939 while tenders were called for other buildings to be built. It was intended the mast would be finished in six weeks and the station would be on air by Easter 1939. The erection of the mast which had been extended to 228 feet in height was a disaster. A pulley failed causing the newly constructed mast to buckle and fall. It was extensively damaged. A new mast had to be commissioned which took two to three weeks to build. In the end the two contractors commissioned to erect the mast were unable to do so. The Mayor of Lithgow Bob Fullagar, who was Manager of the Lithgow State Mine at the time, took over the job and had the mast installed.

=== Official opening ===
The official opening of 2LT occurred on 2 July 1939. The station was opened by the Australian Minister for Customs Mr. J. N. Lawson, who in congratulating Midwest Radio Network (then Lithgow Broadcasters), said the Australian system of broadcasting provided greater variety, and unlike stations in Britain that were under government control, had greater freedom, "and freedom in broadcasting was just as important a bulwark as freedom of the press."

=== Station threatened by bushfires ===
In January 1940, six months after 2LT first went to air the station, along with a number of cottages and State Pine forests, was endangered by bushfires but survived without damage.

=== Australian Government censorship ===
On 13 May 1940 Australia's Postmaster-General imposed a restriction on 2LT preventing it from allowing two members of the Western Mining Federation to speak on the station because of 'objectionable remarks' including their description of the word 'scab.' The Postmaster General directed the two men be barred from speaking on the station again unless scripts of what they were to say were submitted to his department and approved beforehand. The minister also directed the station itself not be able to comment on industrial matters unless it followed the same procedure. He said he had directed the Crown Solicitor to investigate the powers of the government in such matters.

=== Station linked to communist threat ===
The Postmaster-General linked the station ban to his government's concern about communism infiltrating the unions. He was quoted as saying "there were only two classes of Australians today, those who were loyal to the country and those who were not." The Minister said anyone who had information that would assist the government in its fight against communism and enemy agents should, submit it to the nearest police station, or send it to him direct.

=== National coal mining strike ===
The Australian Government restriction imposed on 2LT occurred as a national coal mining strike was entering its third month, with most coal mines in Australia located in and around Lithgow. The strike brought unprecedented attention from the Australian Government as it had come in the midst of World War II and was depriving manufacturing plants focused on the development of military equipment and arms, including the Lithgow Small Arms Factory, of vitally needed coal supplies. Miners were being pressed by unions to stay on strike despite pleas from Prime Minister Robert Menzies that the War Effort was under threat. "If we do not obtain ample supplies of coal soon our war programme must be curtailed drastically", he said at the time. This is unthinkable when our strong and calculating enemy is throwing all resources into a terrific gamble for world domination", he said.

=== News services commenced ===
From February 1942 the Australian Broadcasting Commission by arrangement with the Federation of Commercial Broadcasters began providing news services to 2LT and other regional Australian stations free of charge.

=== Andrews Sisters banned ===
In December 1943 the 2LT general manager Desmond Day banned all forty records by the Andrews Sisters. At the time he said the standard of music on the station, which he took over as general manager 5 months earlier, was very low and consisted of nothing but "boogie-woogie and hot jazz." The Manager said at the time the War had increased the average age of listeners to 35 to 40, and he hadn't met anyone over the age of 35 that liked the Andrews Sisters. "I don't believe in tom-toms. The people want melody and good vocalists", he said.

=== Plan to introduce commercial news service ===
Three news services a day covering national and international news were scheduled to commence in May 1945 on 2LT, on relay from 2GB Sydney, by arrangement with The Sydney Morning Herald. 'The aim was to give an objective, balanced and entirely factual survey of overseas and Australian events as reliable as the Herald itself and free from comment of any kind except when a survey of press and other opinion on any event of importance abroad becomes in itself a matter of news interest. Aside from international and Australian news wires, it was noted The Sydney Morning Herald had correspondents in London, New York, India, and China, and war correspondents in Western and Southern Europe, the Supreme Allied Headquarters in Europe, and General MacArthur's headquarters in the Pacific

=== Australian Government blocks new news service ===
The Australian government however moved to block 2LT and other stations taking the new news service as it would replace the existing service provided by the government-controlled Australian Broadcasting Commission, which had been provided free of cost to the station since February 1942. The Acting Prime Minister Ben Chifley announced the Postmaster-General would refuse to provide landlines for the new service. For some stations however, including 2LT, the government would allow landlines to be allocated provided the stations agreed to also broadcast the ABC news.

=== First live boxing broadcast ===
In February 1946 2LT joined a network of 25 Macquarie Network and co-operative stations Australia-wide to broadcast a boxing match, which was the largest hook-up ever for a boxing match in Australia.

=== Statewide Food for Britain appeal ===
2LT assisted in a statewide appeal in February 1946 for the Food for Britain Fund.

=== Poisoned potatoes ===
On 1 December 1946, at the direction of Lithgow Police, 2LT broadcast a warning to thieves who had stolen a bag of potatoes from a farm at nearby Portland that the potatoes had been treated with copper sulphate poison. The police were concerned the thieves may have tried to sell the potatoes unaware they were poisoned.

=== Western Newspapers ownership threatened ===
Western Newspapers was the majority owner of Midwest Radio Network in 1948, at a time when the Australian government was being pressed to end the monopoly of broadcasting station ownership by newspaper groups, with parts of the Chifley Cabinet wanting station licenses re-allocated, or for all broadcasting to be nationalised.

=== Bloodhound joins 2LT search for missing boys ===
On 1 November 1950 an appeal on 2LT brought together 150 men to form search parties for two young boys who went missing in Lithgow. The search party later grew to 500 and was joined by a bloodhound who had earlier discovered the body of a 70-year-old man.

=== UK-based Mirror Group forced to sell ===
By 1952 Midwest Radio Network (then Lithgow Broadcasters Pty Ltd) which had one asset, 2LT, was majority-owned by Mirror Pictorial Assets, a subsidiary of the UK-based Mirror Newspaper Group. In 1952 the Australian parliament passed a law forbidding foreign companies from having a controlling interest in Australian radio stations. On 23 January 1953, Mirror announced it was disposing of its majority shareholdings in nine stations including 2LT. After the sale its interest in Midwest, and consequently 2LT, was reduced to 28.9%.

=== NSW North Coast flood appeal ===
Midwest Radio Network's 2LT joined Sydney station 2GB in February 1954 sending clothes to the flood-stricken New South Wales north coast after an appeal launched by Sydney Mayor Pat Hills.

=== Christmas Day 1956 bushfires ===
Bushfires were raging eight miles from the city of Lithgow on Christmas Day 1956 when 2LT broadcast a call for volunteers to fight the fires. As a result, a number of the fires, which until then were blazing unchecked, were able to be put out.

=== John Fairfax becomes major shareholder ===
In 1964 Midwest Radio Network was partially owned by London-based Associated Television. On 29 June 1964 Associated announced it had sold its interests in 6 radio stations and eight television stations. As a result of the sale John Fairfax became a substantial shareholder of Midwest whose only asset at the time remained 2LT.

=== New public company floated ===
In 1986 Midwest's radio interests were transferred to a newly established public company named Midwest Radio Limited, which was listed on the Australian Securities Exchange. Midwest retained a shareholding in the new company but the radio assets were under the control of the new entity.

=== Kiss FM launched ===
In 1996 KISS FM was established and began broadcasting that year.

=== 2LT wins national Community Project award ===
2LT won the Single Major Specific Community Project in the 1997 Rawards (Radio Industry Awards) for a 900 2LT Road Safety Campaign.

=== Takeover of public company ===
Midwest Radio Limited was taken over by former listed company Unitel Media Group Limited in a deal first proposed to the Australian Securities Exchange ominously on 11 September 2001. Unitel's primary asset was a 49.9% interest in Star Broadcasting Network, which owned and operated River 94.9 in Ipswich, Queensland, and a number of regional radio stations in South Australia. The deal closed on 18 June 2002. On 30 August 2002 the name of the public company was changed to 'Media Corporation Australia Limited'.

=== Surprise sale to Rural Press ===
Within months, in January 2003, Unitel Media, now owned by Media Corporation Australia, suddenly and surprisingly sold its Star Broadcasting Network holding to its joint venture partner Rural Press Limited. No price was disclosed, nor was any reason given for the sale.

=== ACMA proposes technical specification variations ===
In January 2008 the Australian Communications & Media Authority proposed variations to the technical specifications of the company's broadcasting stations which would enable more people living in the Blue Mountains area to listen to the company's radio services.

=== Company takes back control of broadcasting assets ===
On 3 January 2010 Midwest Radio Network terminated the receivership of Media Corporation Australia Limited and took back control of the company's broadcasting stations.

=== Jennifer Menchin named Best News Presenter and Best Talk Presenter at ACRAs ===
Midwest Radio Network's Jennifer Menchin won the Best News Presenter and the Best Talk Presenter at the 2011 Australian Commercial Radio Awards (ACRAs), the national broadcasting industry awards presentation conducted by Commercial Radio Australia. The (ACRAs) are held annually by Commercial Radio Australia.

== Current activity ==
Midwest Radio Network is now largely a management services and holding company which oversees various assets.

=== Radio ===
==== 2LT ====
This station continues to be operated by the company and is now in its ninth decade of broadcasting. Midwest Radio Network was originally established to act as licensee for the station. Although the broadcasting license for 2LT was granted in June 1938 the station did not begin broadcasting until July 1939. The new station formed part of the Macquarie Central Western Network, and featured that network's programming as well as locally produced content. The station has been operating continuously since 1939 and now broadcasts to an extended coverage area which includes Lithgow, Bathurst, Oberon and other parts of the Central Tablelands in the Central West, as well as the Blue Mountains.

In 2011 Jennifer Menchin from 2LT won two Australian Commercial Radio Awards in the categories of best talk presenter and best news presenter.

==== Move FM ====
In 1996 Midwest Radio Network sought and was granted a license to establish an FM radio station to complement 2LT. The company was granted a license to broadcast on 95.3MHz and began operating as KISS 95.3. Later a frequency conflict with a Sydney station led to a change to 107.9 MHz and a name change. Finally in 2011 the station was renamed to MoveFM.

On 15 April 2004 MoveFM's former frequency was auctioned for $106 million by the Australian Broadcasting Tribunal. In exchange the Tribunal awarded Midwest two licenses for additional FM frequencies and areas, allowing them to extend coverage by operating translator stations in the Blue Mountains. Despite having been granted the licenses, the MRN states:

The company... is establishing translators to better serve the Blue Mountains... [which] have been extensively delayed due to a range of issues the company has faced including the protractedness of negotiations with the Australian broadcasting regulator ACMA to finalise appropriate technical operating conditions, and completion of works on the transmission tower at Wentworth Falls. The translators are expected to be fully operational in 2018.

=== Other activity ===
The company also owns a hotel reservation website, which it claims is not a significant part of its business, and has land holdings in Port Macquarie and Geraldton.

As of 2025, Midwest Radio Network and an affiliate, The Mainstream Media, are both distributors for a parent company, Big News Network, which is based in Dubai. Several of their websites have republished stories from RT, including for audiences in the United Kingdom and European Union. Both markets have previously sanctioned RT. Logically characterized these websites as pink slime. McAvoy denied any connection with RT.

== Operations ==
=== Broadcasting ===
- 2LT AM radio station frequency 900 kHz servicing Lithgow, New South Wales, Bathurst, New South Wales, and Blue Mountains (New South Wales), Australia
- Move FM radio station frequency 107.9 MHz servicing Lithgow, New South Wales, Bathurst, New South Wales and Blue Mountains (New South Wales), Australia
- 99.5 MHz FM translator servicing the Blue Mountains (New South Wales) west of Sydney (to be formally launched in 2022–23)
- 101.1 MHz FM translator servicing the Blue Mountains (New South Wales) west of Sydney (to be formally launched in 2022–23)
