= Hotels (magazine) =

HOTELS
- Cover of HOTELS magazine
- Editor: David Eisen
- Categories: business magazine
- Frequency: Monthly
- Founded: 1966
- Company: Outclick Media
- Country: USA
- Based in: Irvine, Calif.
- Language: English
- Website: www.hotelsmag.com
- ISSN: 1047-2975

HOTELS is a trade publication serving the information needs of the worldwide hospitality industry.

Established in 1966, HOTELS is published monthly. Regular features include design, food and beverage, technology, and a global update section with industry news, executive interviews and marketing stories.

Along with monthly print articles, HOTELS posted new content on its Web site every day. Some of this came in the form of press releases and aggregated industry news, while some was original content such as blog posts or podcasts. Topics included investment, development, brand trends, sales and marketing, finance, technology and coverage of hotel conferences.

As of December 2006, total BPA audited circulation was 62,330 subscribers. The magazine had readers in more than 165 countries around the world.

Former owner Reed Business Information sold off the magazine to its publisher, Dan Hogan, in 2010. Hogan then sold the magazine to Marketing & Technology Group.

In 2021, HOTELS was acquired by Ali Jahangiri.
