= Haymarket, New South Wales =

Suburb of Sydney, New South Wales

Haymarket
- Suburb
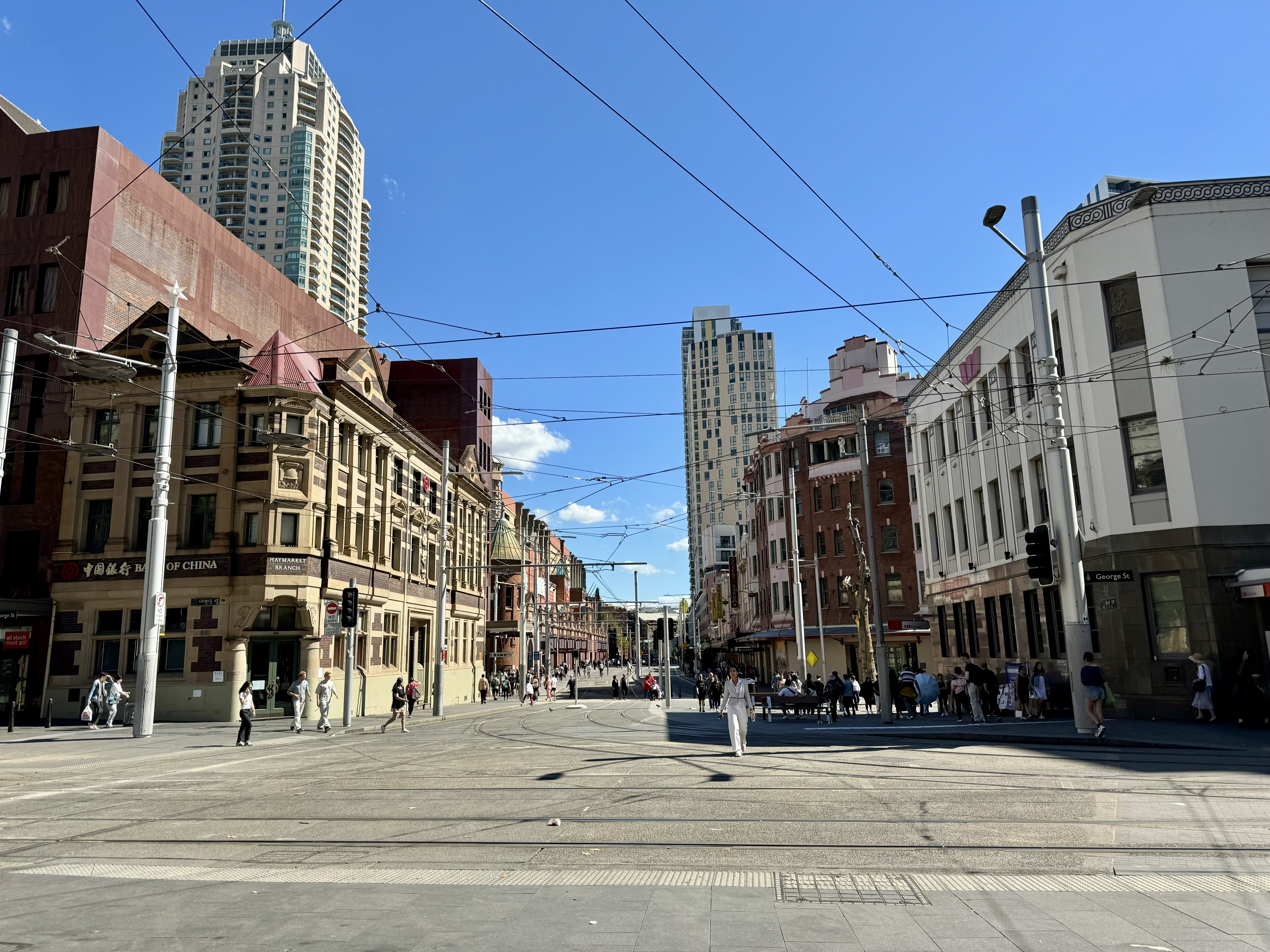
- The intersection between George Street and Hay Street. 2024

- Interactive map of Haymarket
- Country: Australia
- State: New South Wales
- City: Sydney
- LGA: City of Sydney

Government
  - State electorate: Sydney
  - Federal division: Sydney

Area
  - Total: 0.52 km^{2} (0.20 sq mi)

Population
  - Total: 8,305 (SAL 2021)
  - Density: 15,971/km^{2} (41,360/sq mi)
- Postcode: 2000
Suburbs around Haymarket
Ultimo	Sydney CBD	Sydney CBD
Ultimo	Haymarket	Surry Hills
Chippendale	Surry Hills	Surry Hills

Haymarket is an inner city suburb of Sydney, New South Wales, Australia. It is located at the southern end of the Sydney central business district in the local government area of the City of Sydney. Haymarket includes much of Sydney's Chinatown, Thaitown and Railway Square localities. Haymarket is adjacent to Darling Harbour and is surrounded by the suburbs of Ultimo, Chippendale, Surry Hills and the Sydney CBD.

== History ==
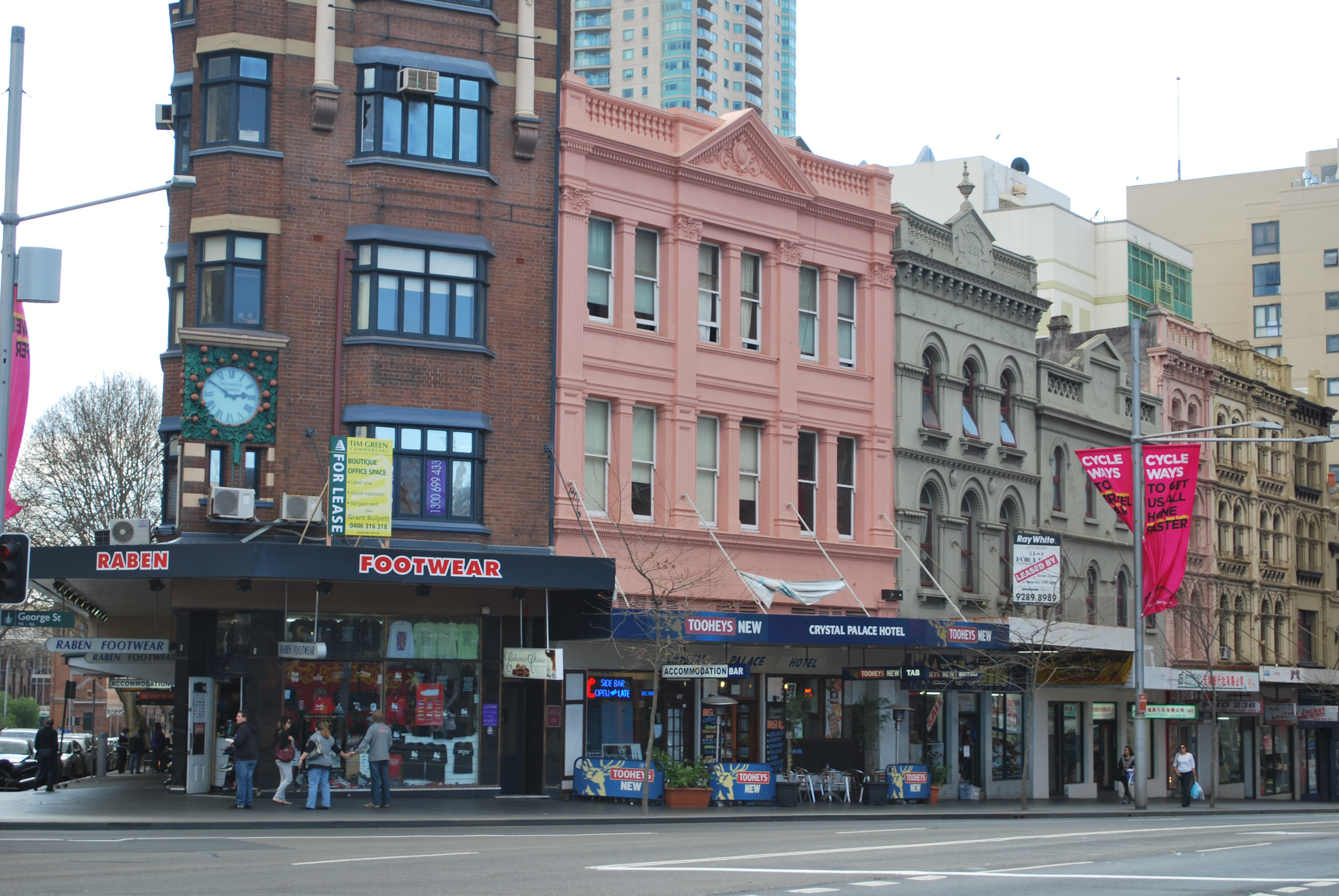
Crystal Palace Hotel, erected in the 1900s

Sydney's produce markets were located in Haymarket from the early 20th century through to the 1980s when they were moved to a new site at Flemington. Paddy's Markets still operate on part of the site of the vegetable markets as a produce and flea market. The 'Market City' complex contains the markets, The Peak apartment building, a modern shopping centre featuring a food court, restaurants, boutiques, specialty shops and entertainment options, such as a cinema and amusement centre.

The outer walls of the original vegetable market, built in 1909, were preserved and restored as an example of Edwardian architecture. They were part of the original city markets—designed by city architect C.Broderick—which were bounded by Hay Street, Quay Street and Thomas Street. They were built to replace the old Belmore Market, which had failed because it was too far from Darling Harbour.

The new markets included the Sydney City Markets building (Ultimo Road), designed by George McRae and built in 1910, and the Sydney Markets Bell Tower (Quay Street), built in 1911 and restored by the State Bank in 1985. The bell tower is now incorporated within the University of Technology Sydney.

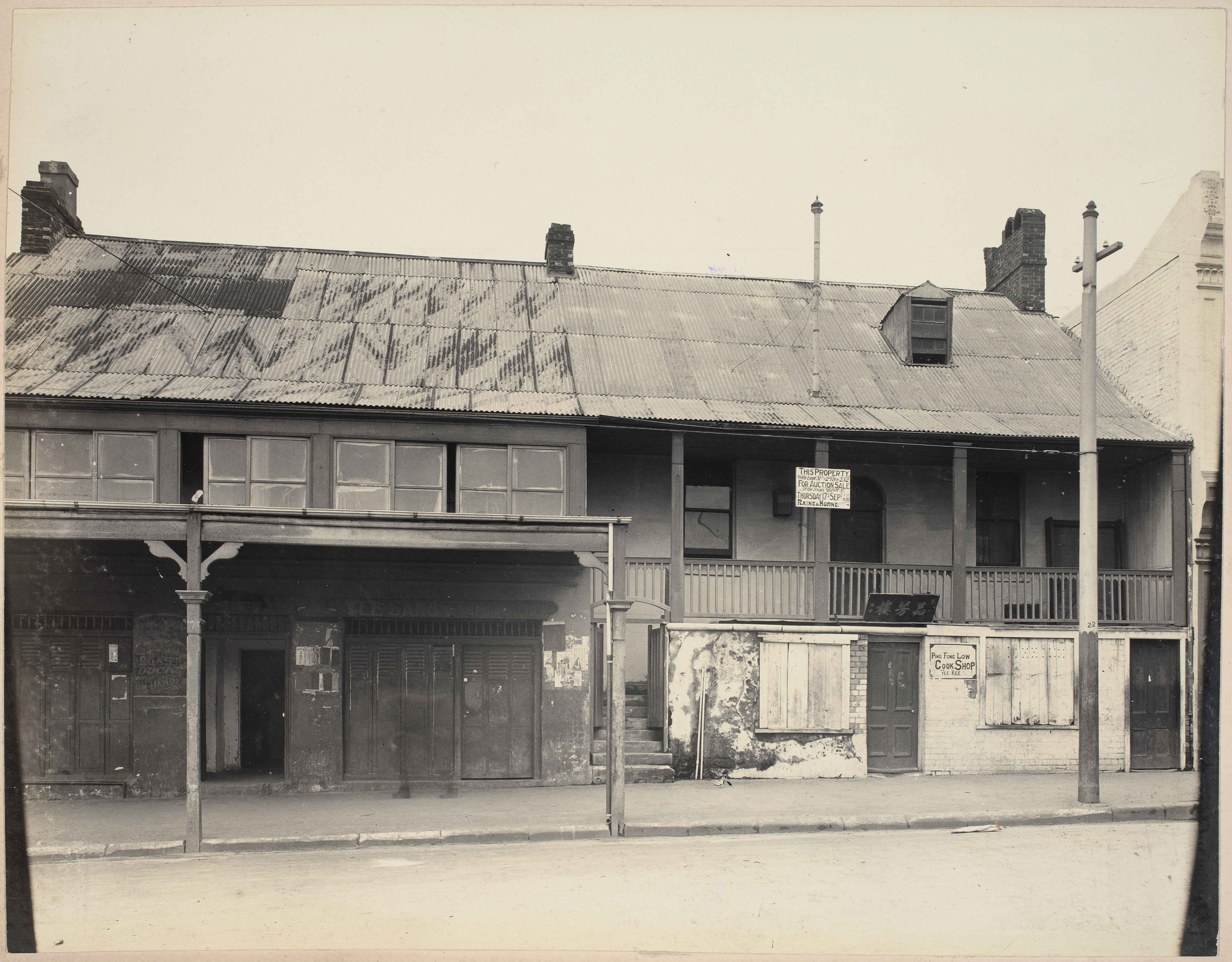
Campbell Street in Haymarket circa 1908, with a sign on the building reading "Ping Fong Low Cook Shop"

By the 1920s, Sydney's "Chinatown" had moved to Haymarket from the Rocks and Market Street near Darling Harbour. Haymarket became a commercial and community centre for the Chinese community who lived in large numbers in this area and nearby areas such as Surry Hills. With the relocation of the produce market to Flemington and outflow of residents to the suburbs, the commercial role of Haymarket declined. The City of Sydney authorities embarked on a project to establish Haymarket as a tourist-oriented Chinatown. In the 1980s, Dixon Street was pedestrianised, and nearby redevelopments were steered towards creating the atmosphere of an "authentic" Chinatown. This included the construction of Chinese paifang-style gates, with stone lions, on Dixon Street, and other Chinese-style street furniture, as well as encouraging Chinese restaurants to open along Dixon Street. Despite significant demographic change due to successive waves of immigration from Asia, today's Chinatown remains a centre for Asian restaurants and other businesses.

The Capitol Theatre, in Haymarket was built in 1928.

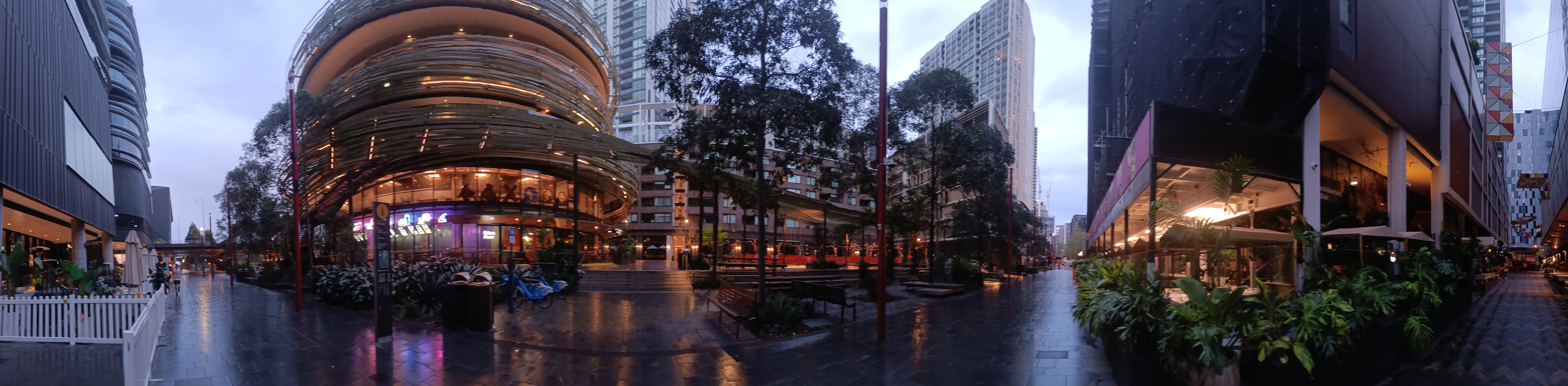
Darling Square, Haymarket. 2025

== Heritage listings ==
Haymarket has a number of heritage-listed sites, including:

- 17 Little Pier Street: Hydraulic Pump Station
- 181–187 Hay Street: 181–187 Hay Street (the Corporation Building), which houses 4A Centre for Contemporary Asian Art

== Demographics ==
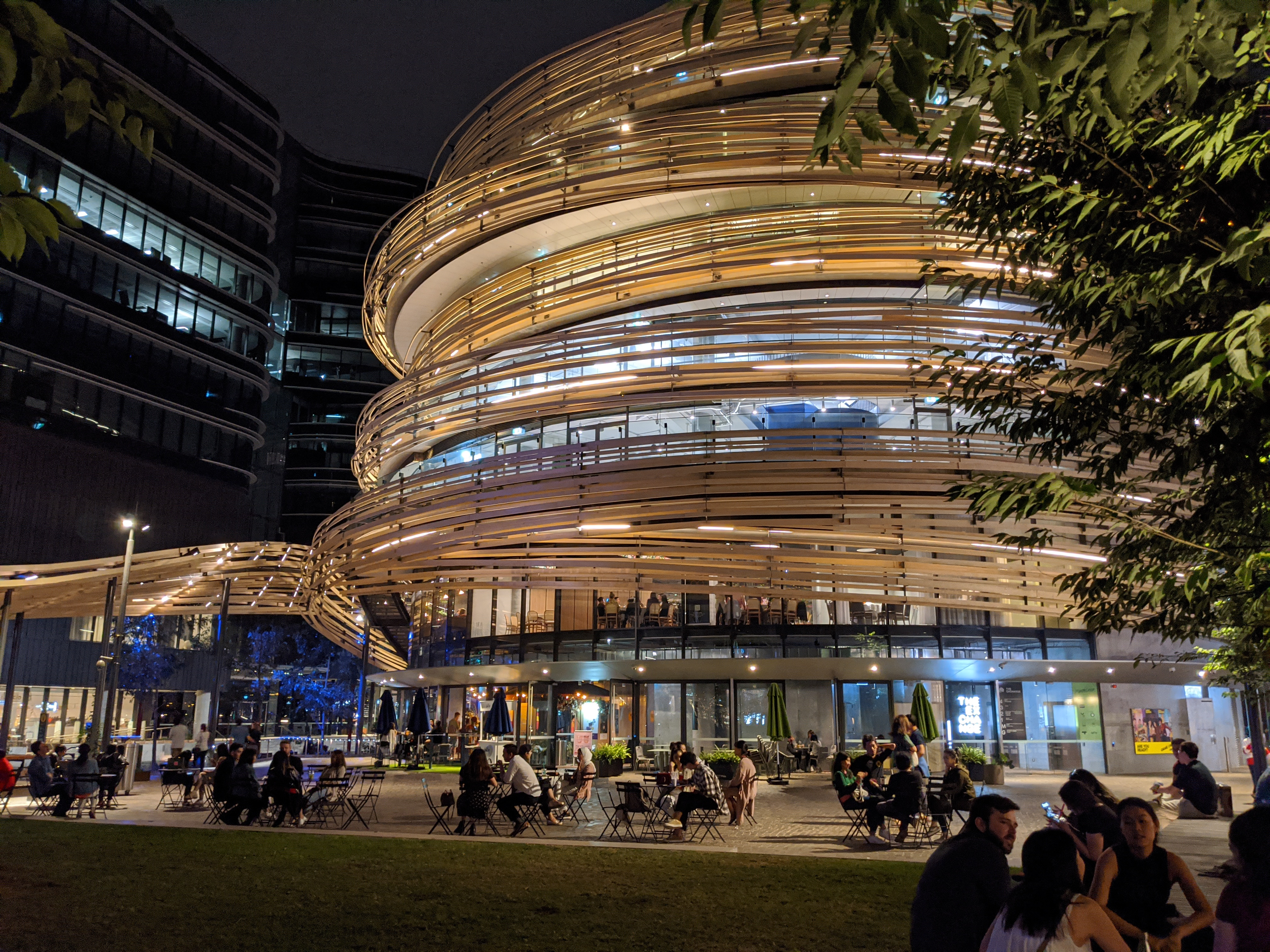
The addition of Darling Square has expanded residential dwellings in Haymarket

Historical population
Year	Pop.	±%
2001	5,091	—
2006	4,312	−15.3%
2011	5,376	+24.7%
2016	7,353	+36.8%
2021	8,305	+12.9%

In 2011, 87.8% of the population was foreign born, the highest for any Australian suburb.

At the 2016 census, there were 7,353 residents in Haymarket. The median age was 27 years and 49.7% of people were aged 20–29 years. More than half of Haymarket residents were attending an educational institution, with the majority of these people attending a tertiary or technical institution. Just 8.3% of residents were born in Australia. The most common other countries of birth were Thailand 20.7%, China 18.9%, Indonesia 11.5%, Korea, Republic of (South) 5.0% and Vietnam 2.1%. 71.6% of people spoke a language other than English at home. The main languages spoken were Thai 20.4%, Mandarin 20.3%, Indonesian 10.2%, Cantonese 5.1% and Korean 4.8%. The most common responses for religion were No Religion 33.2% and Buddhism 30.5%. 99.8% of dwellings were flats, units or apartments. 47.8% of households renting their accommodation were paying more than 30% of household income as rent, compared to the NSW average of 12.9% and the Australian average of 11.5%.

According to the 2021 census, Haymarket's population increased to 8,305, with 87% being foreign-born. Chinese ancestry was the largest demographic at 40.9%, followed by Thai at 16.2%, English at 8.7%, Indonesian at 7.2%, and Australian at 3.8%. Additionally, 82.7% spoke a language other than English at home, with Mandarin being the most common at 24.3%, followed by Thai at 16.3%, Indonesian at 8.6%, Cantonese at 5.7%, and Korean at 2.5%. The most common responses for religion were No Religion 40.1% and Buddhism 27.7%. Median weekly household income is $1,931, while the median weekly rent stands at $650.

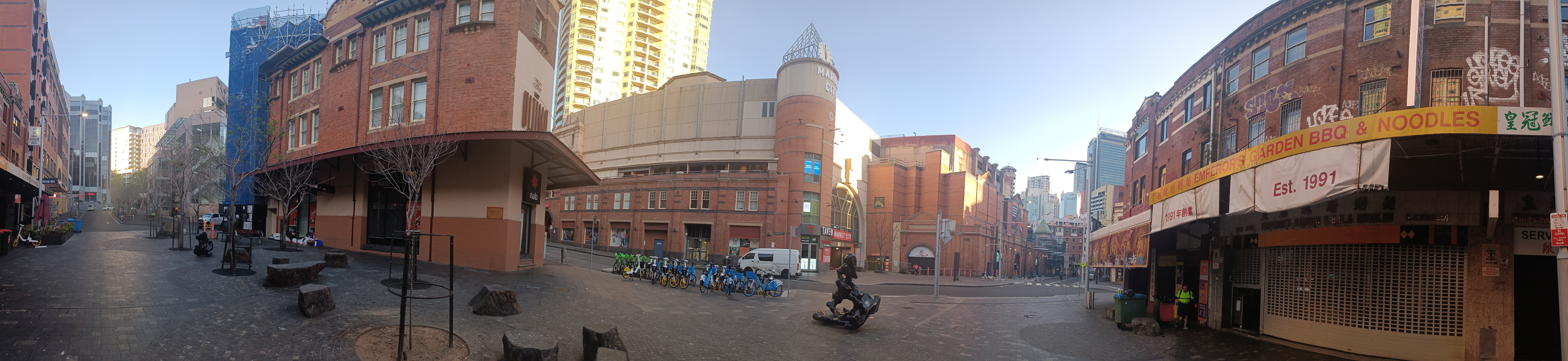
Market city, Haymarket, Sydney - 2025

== Transport ==
Central railway station sits on the southern border.

Haymarket is also serviced by the Inner West Light Rail line with stations at Central, Capitol Square and Paddy's Markets. The light rail uses a former freight rail corridor. A short section is not used by the light rail having been converted to The Goods Line pedestrian link to Railway Square and Central station. It is also served by the CBD and South East Light Rail with a stop at Chinatown and Haymarket.

== Gallery ==
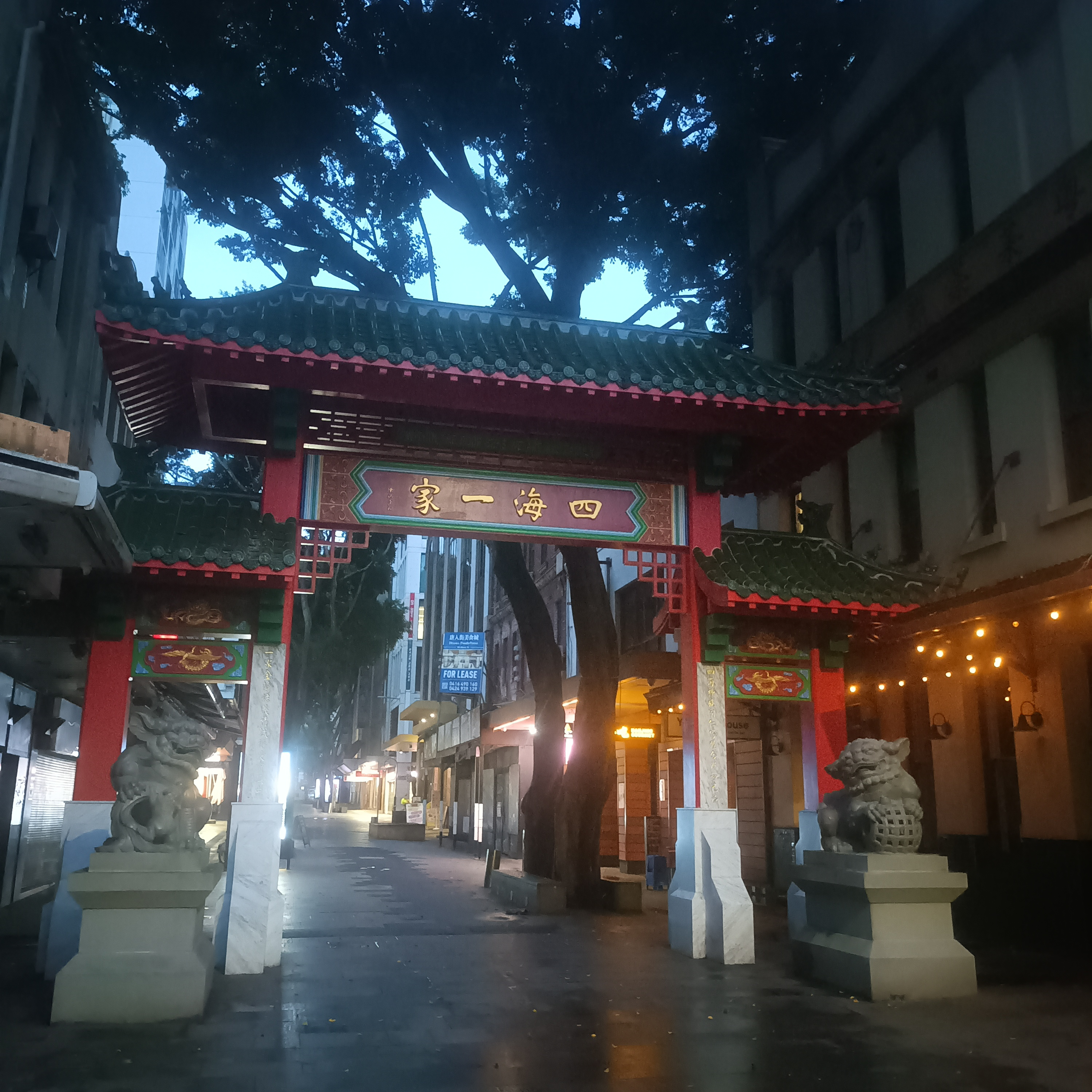
Chinatown gate at the southern entrance to Dixon st, Haymarket. 2026.

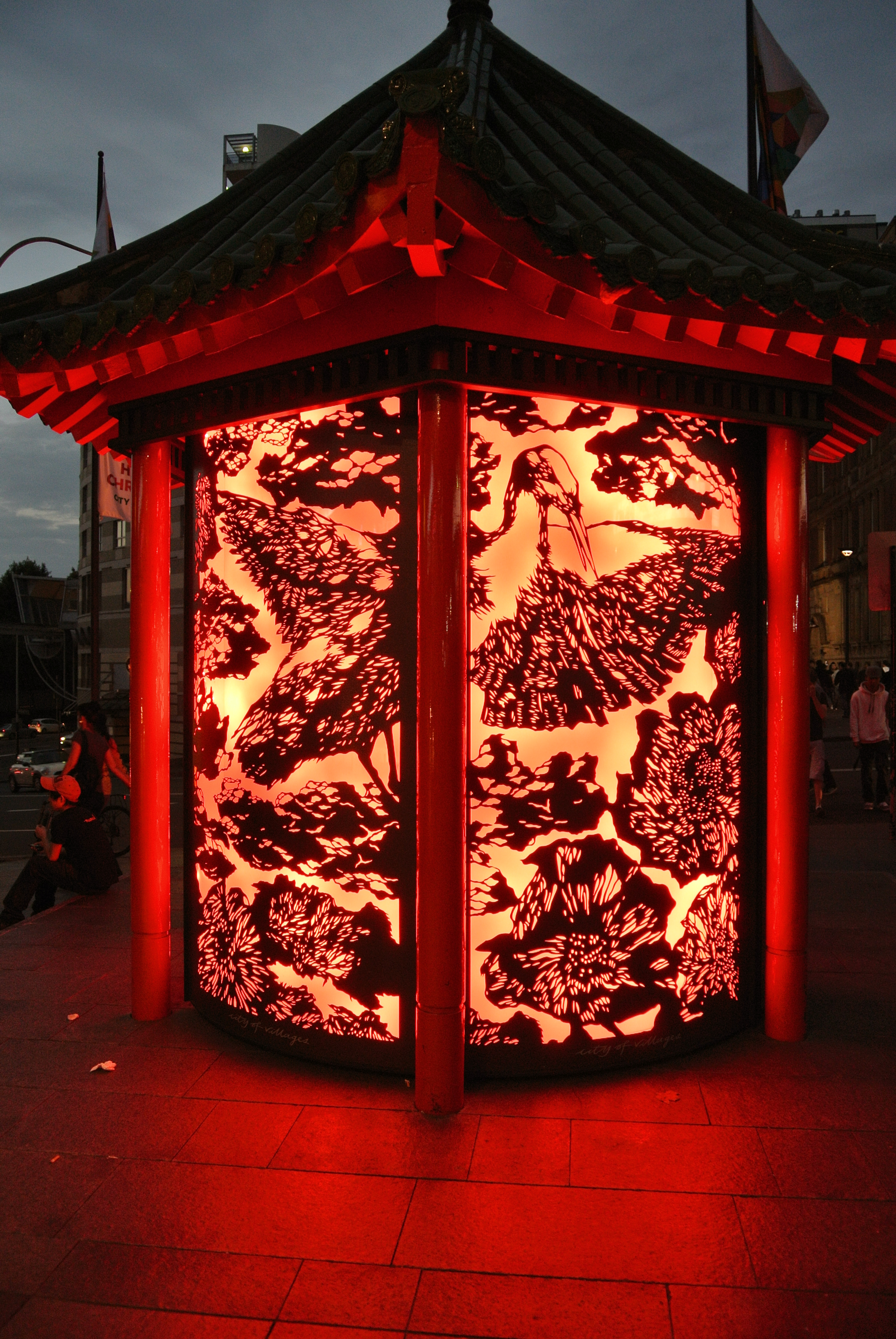
At the northern entrance to Dixon st, Haymarket. 2012

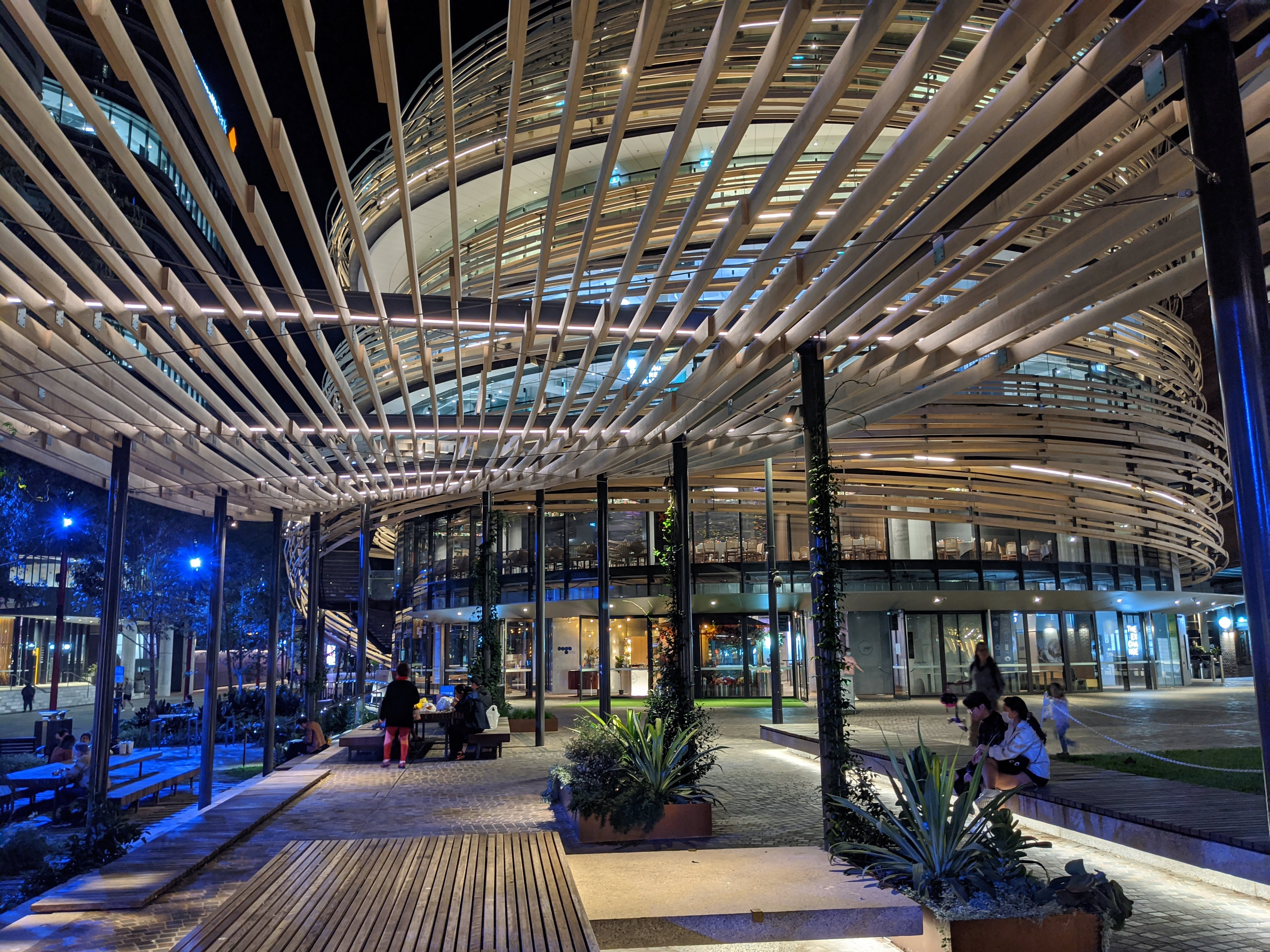
Darling Square. 2020

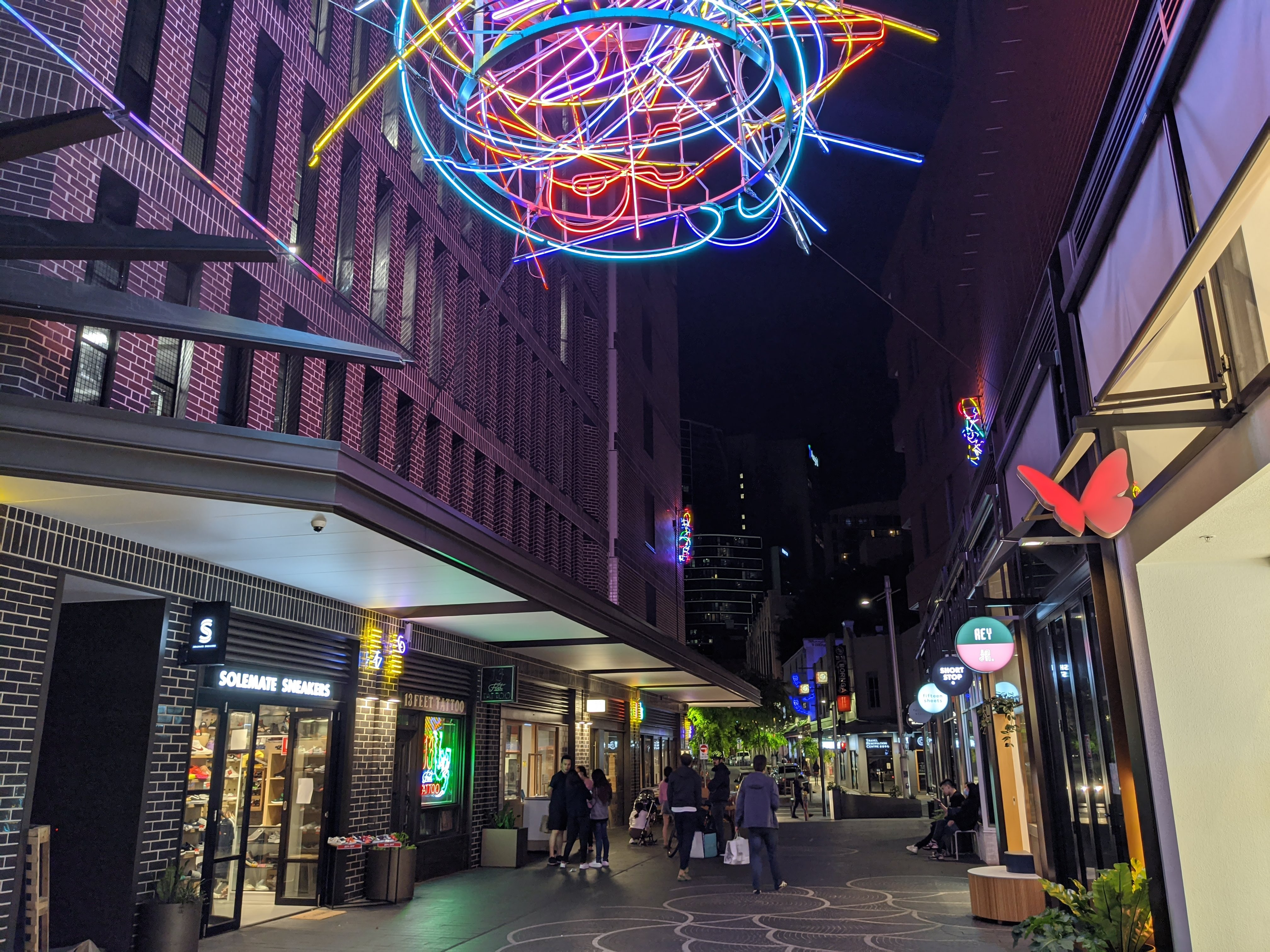
Little Hay Street at night. 2020.

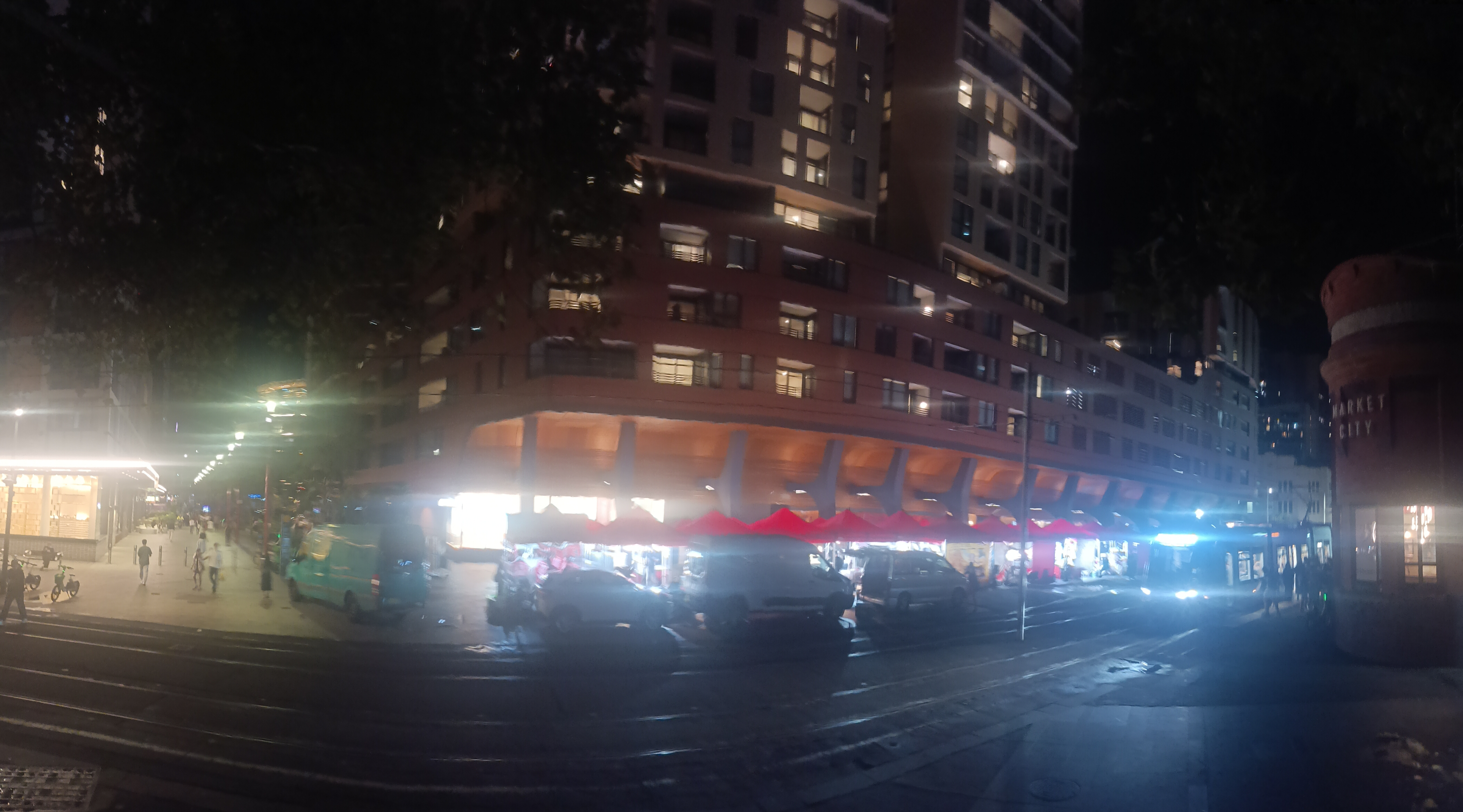
Chinatown night Markets. Corner of Hay and Harbour street Haymarket. 2026

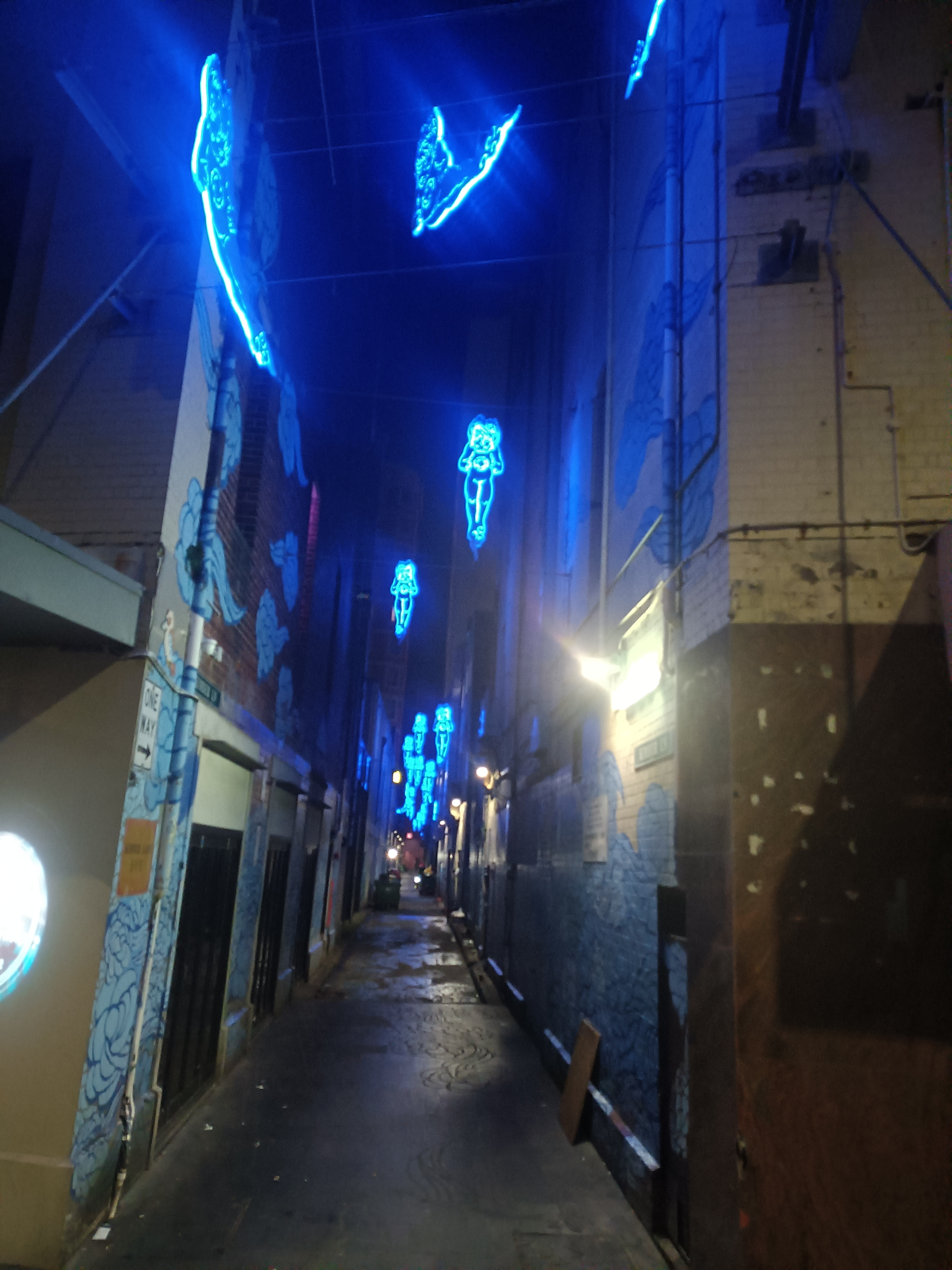
"In Between Two Worlds" by Jason Wing. An installation with wall murals, floor murals and 30 suspended illuminated figures. Completed in 2013. Kimber lane, Haymarket 2025

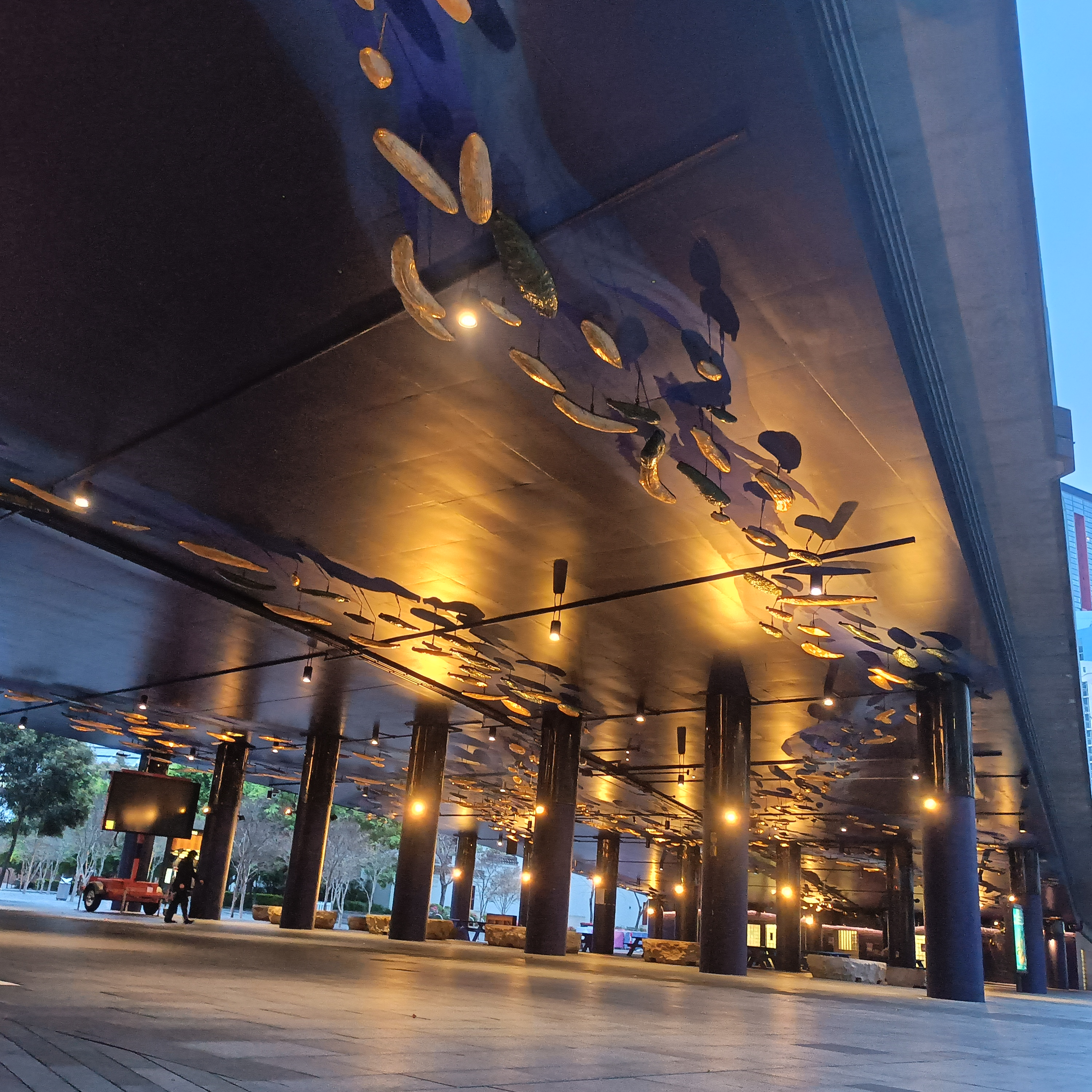
"Canopy" by Jacob Nash, Pier St underpass. 2025

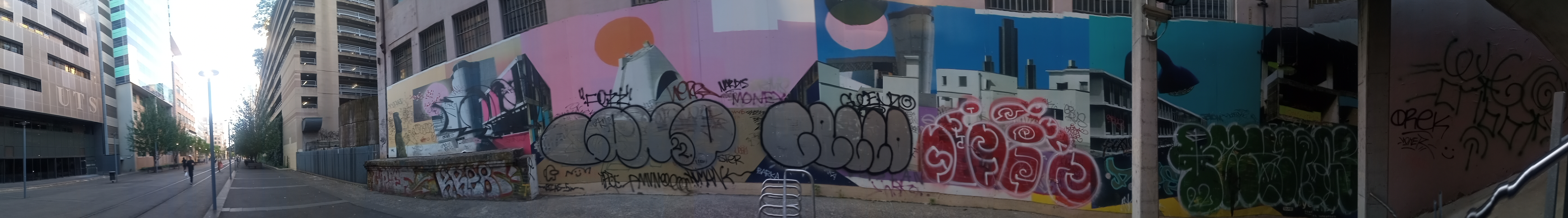
Street art on the Goods Line. 2022

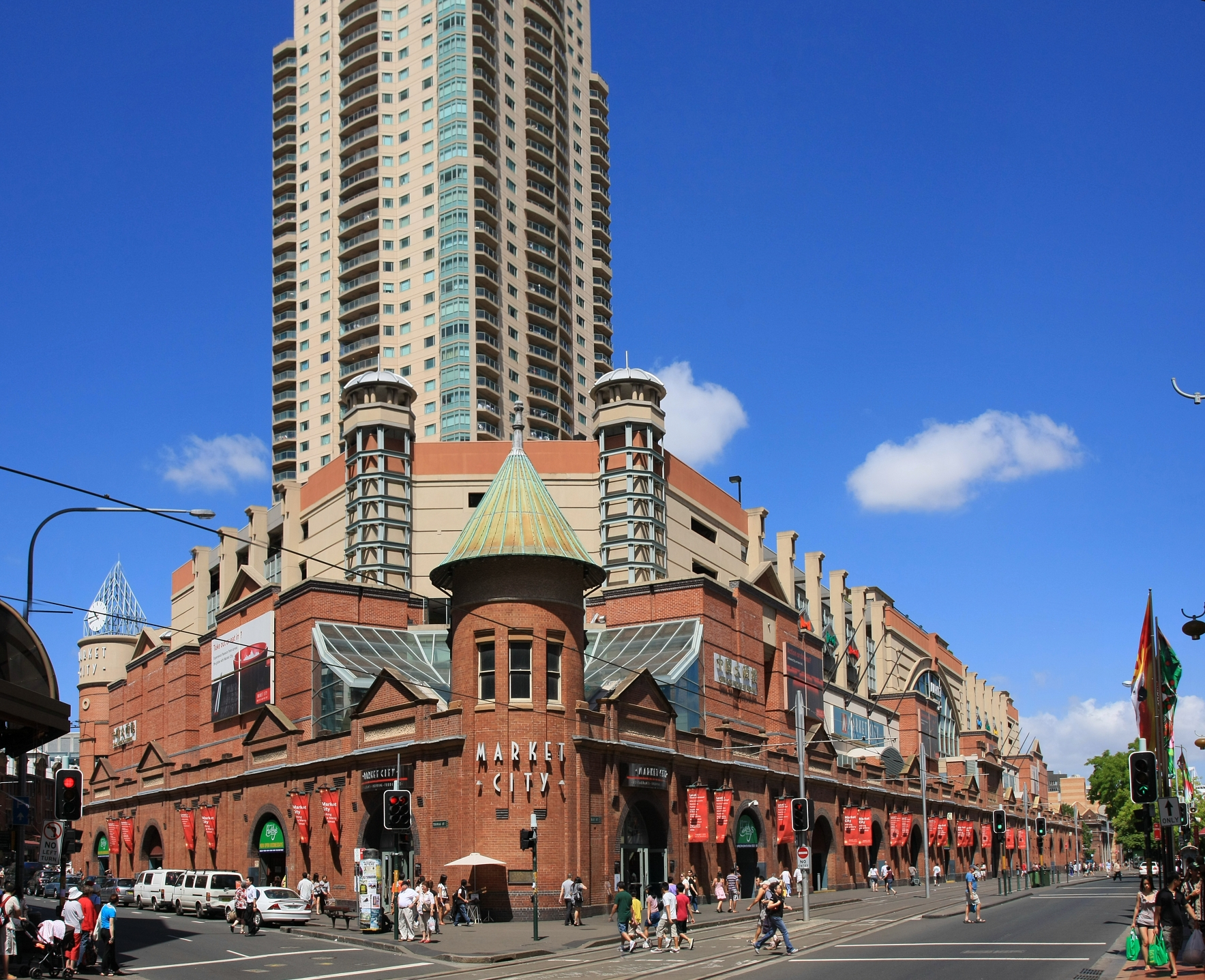
Market City. 2009

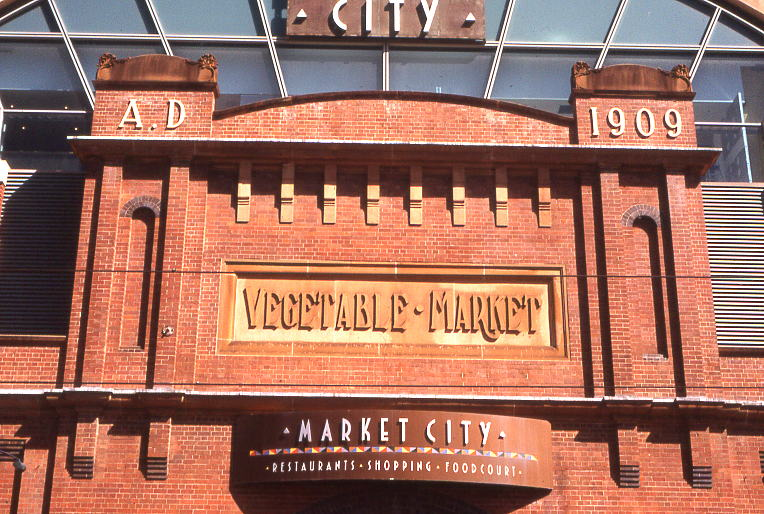
Sign on the side of the vegetable market building, at Market City, Hay Street. 2007

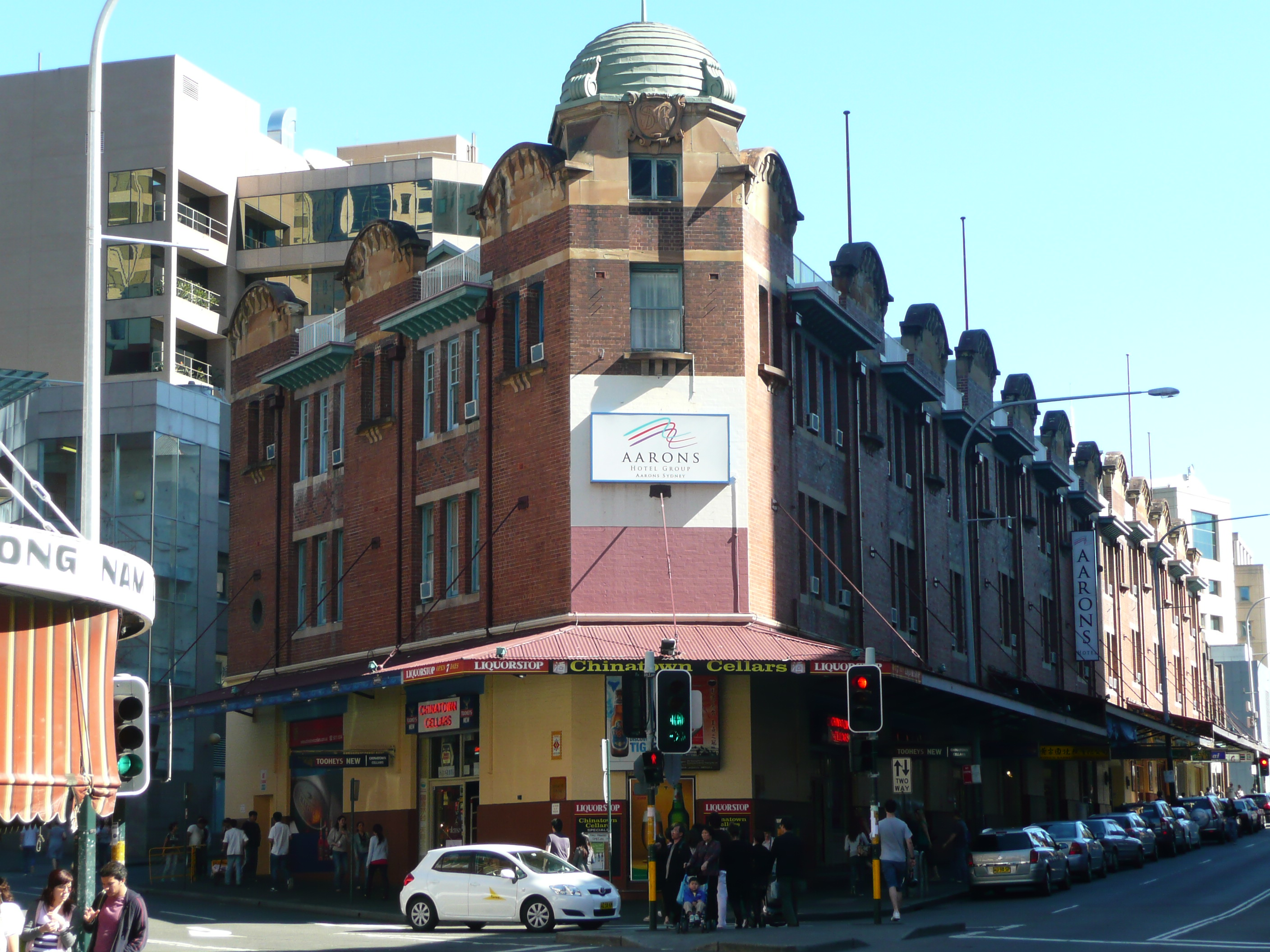
Aarons Hotel, formerly City Markets. 2009

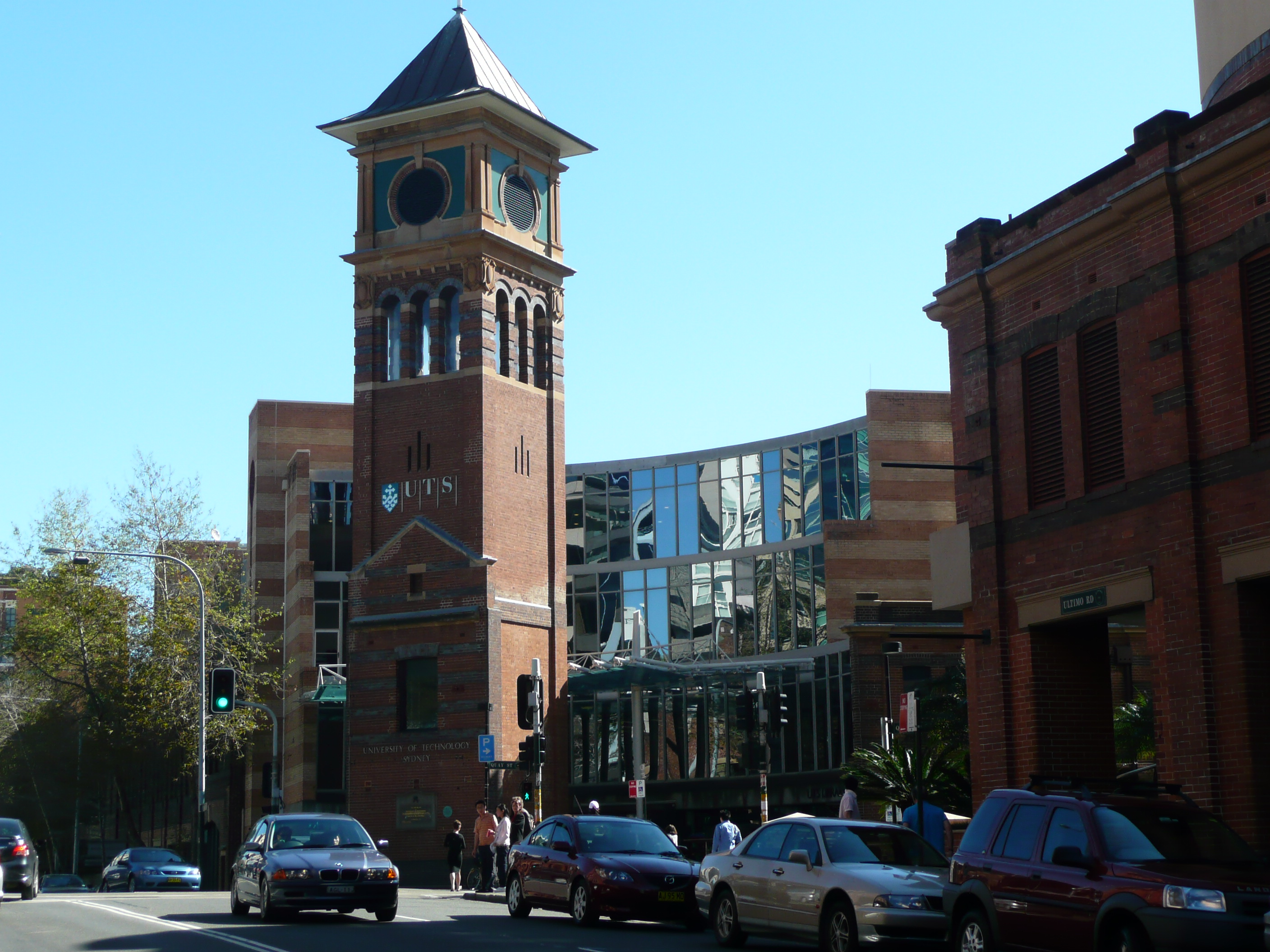
City markets bell tower, Quay Street. 2009

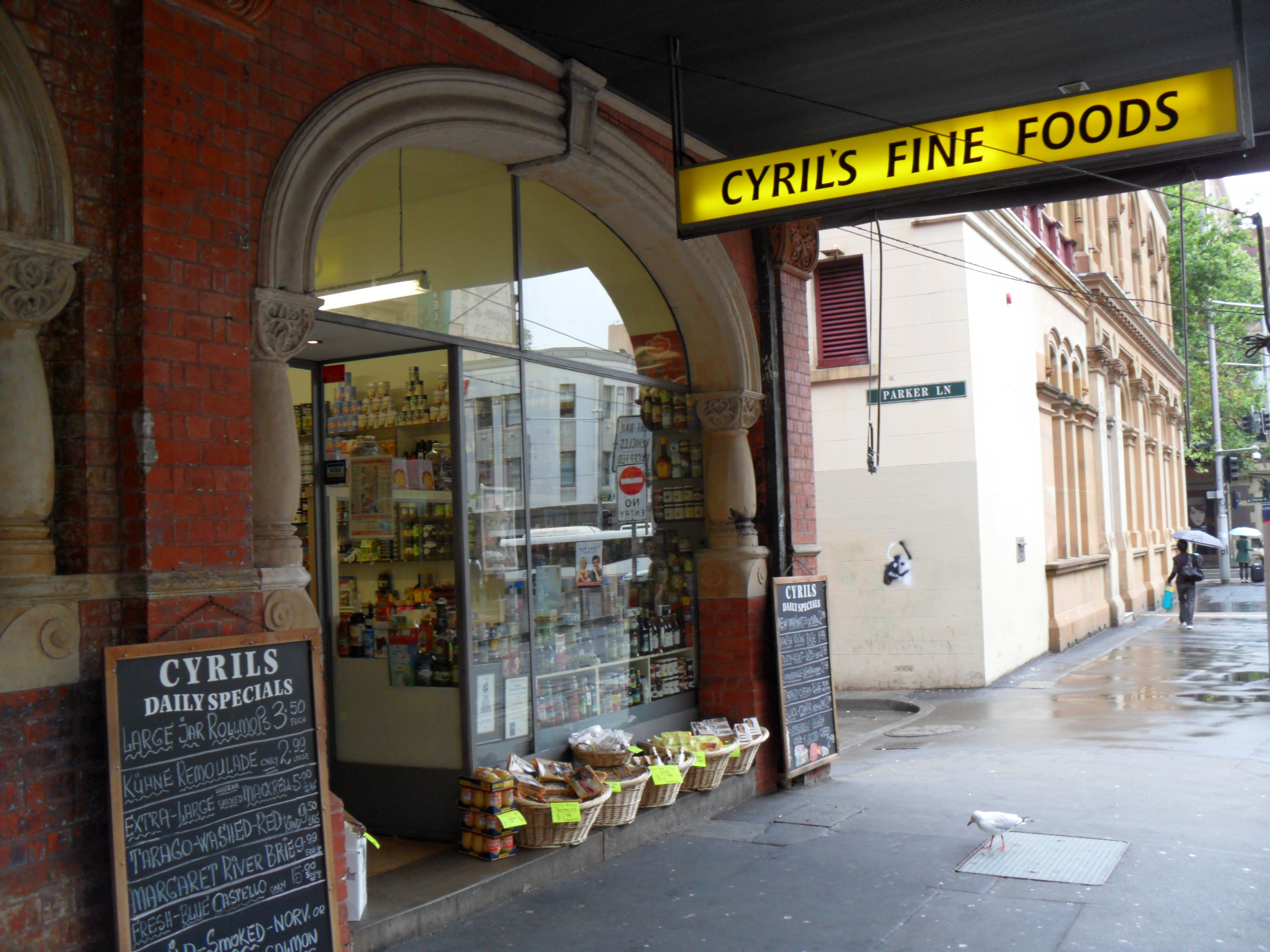
A shop on Hay Street, looking toward George Street. 2011
