= GreenTree Inns =

Chinese hotel company

GreenTree Hospitality Group Ltd.
- Type: Hotel, hotel management, franchise, development
- Traded as: NYSE: GHG
- Founded: 2004
- Number of locations: 2,700+
- Area served: China, United States

GreenTree Hospitality Group Ltd. ("GreenTree" or the "Company") is a pure play franchised hotel operator, headquartered in Shanghai, China, with the majority of its hotels both franchised-and-managed. In 2017, GreenTree was the fourth largest economy to mid-scale hotel group in China based on the number of hotel rooms according to China Hospitality Association.

GreenTree operates one of the economy to mid-scale hotel networks in China. As of December 31, 2018, GreenTree's hotel network comprised ten brands, 2,757 hotels with 221,529 rooms in China, covering 290 cities throughout all 27 provinces and autonomous regions in China. GreenTree sells a major portion of its room nights through its strong direct sales channels, predominantly on its website and mobile app.

== History ==
GreenTree was founded in 2004 by Alex Xu along with a number of other American investment enterprises with the goal of establishing business-oriented hotels. By the end of 2007, only three years after opening its first hotel, they had over 200 locations in China. By the end of 2008, GreenTree had hotels in more than 60 cities with more than 300 hotels. This growth trend continued with 430 hotels in 2009 and 500 hotels in 2010. As of December 31, 2018, GreenTree's hotel network comprised 2,757 hotels with 221,529 rooms in China, covering 290 cities throughout all 27 provinces and autonomous regions in China.

GreenTree finished its IPO on the New York Stock Exchange on March 27, 2018. (NYSE: GHG)

In January 2019, GreenTree had entered into a share purchase agreement to become a major shareholder of Argyle Hotel Management Group (Australia) Pty Ltd. whose network consisted of eight mid-scale and upscale brands ranging from stylish business hotels to five-star luxury hotels.

== Founder ==
Alex S. Xu, chairman and CEO, oversees the business operation within both China and the United States. Mr. Xu serves as Chairman & CEO of both GreenTree Hospitality Group, Inc. (USA) as well as GreenTree Hospitality Group Ltd. (China).

Board of Directors

Alex S. Xu

Founder, chairman of the board of directors and chief executive officer

Gregory James Karns

Director and General Counsel

Akira Hirabayashi

Independent Director

Bingwu Xie

Independent Director

Dong Li

Independent Director

== Franchise ==
GreenTree Hospitality Group Ltd. currently operates ten distinct brands, which include:

- Century Park Residence
- GreenTree Inn
- GreenTree Eastern Hotel
- GreenTree Apartment
- GT Alliance Hotel
- GME Hotel
- GYA Hotel
- VX Hotel
- Vatica Hotel
- Shell Hotel
- Deep Sleep Hotel
