= Hyde Park, Sydney =

Park in Sydney, Australia

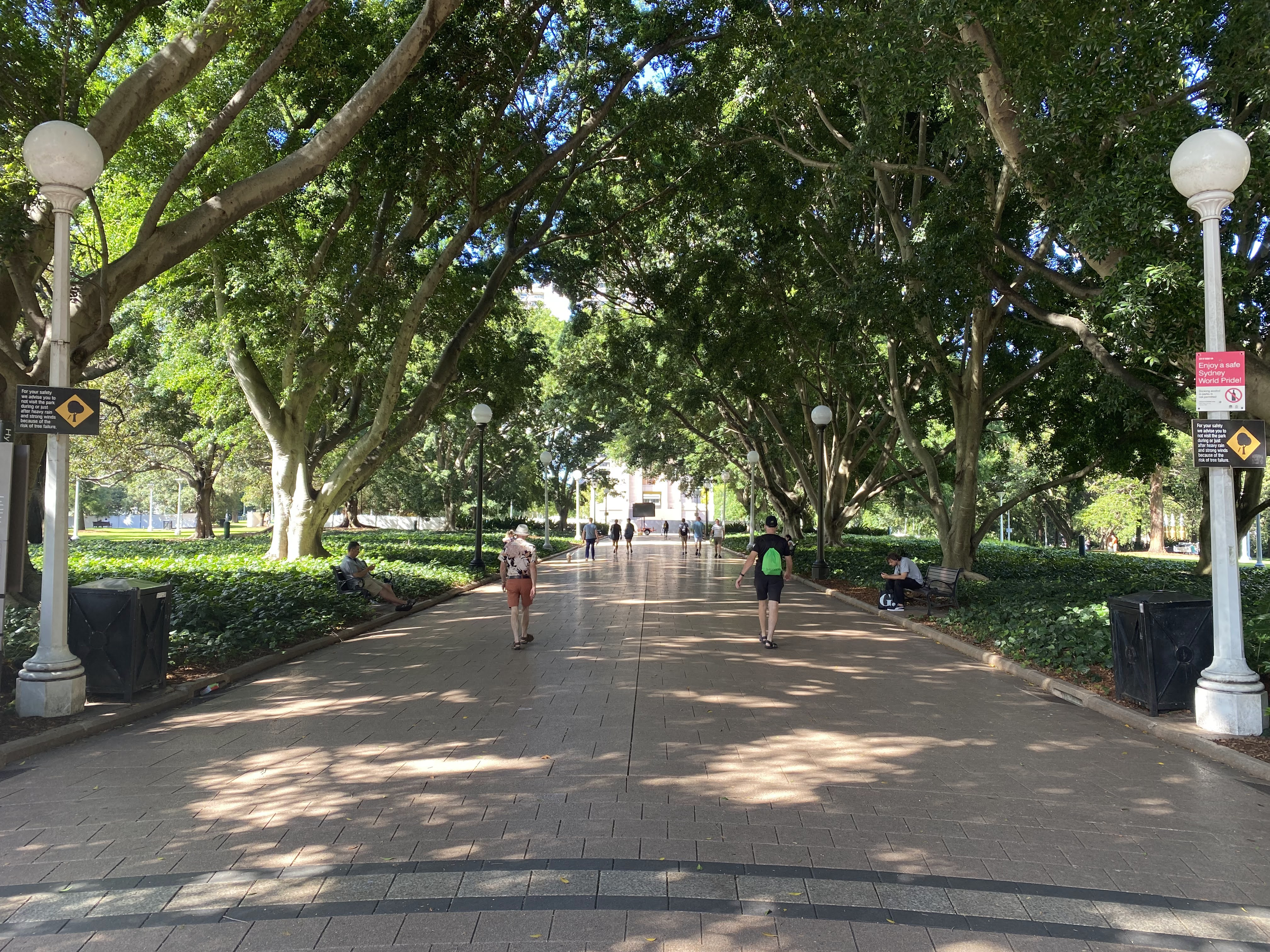
- Avenue of Hill's weeping fig in Hyde Park
- Interactive map of Hyde Park, Sydney
- Type: Urban park
- Location: Central business district (Map)
- Nearest city: Sydney, New South Wales
- Coordinates: 33°52′24″S 151°12′41″E
- Area: 16.2 hectares (40 acres)
- Authorized: 2 November 1810
- Etymology: Hyde Park, London
- Owner: Sydney City Council
- Open: 24 hours
- Status: Open all year
- Parking: The Domain Car Parking Station
- Public transit: St James, Museum, Town Hall, Wynyard, Martin Place, Central or Circular Quay; Martin Place or Gadigal; Circular Quay; Town Hall, Wynyard or QVB; 303, 320, 422 or 461

New South Wales Heritage Register
- Official name: Hyde Park; Sydney Common; Government Domain; The Common; The Exercising Ground; Cricket Ground; Racecourse
- Type: State heritage (landscape)
- Criteria: a., b., c., d., f., g.
- Designated: 13 December 2011
- Reference no.: 1871
- Type: Urban Park
- Category: Parks, Gardens and Trees

Hyde Park is an urban park of 16.2-hectare (40-acre) located in the central business district of Sydney, New South Wales, Australia. It is the oldest public parkland in Australia. Hyde Park is on the eastern fringe of the Sydney city centre and is approximately rectangular in shape, being squared at the southern end and rounded at the northern end. It is bordered on the west by Elizabeth Street, on the east by College Street, on the north by St James Road and Prince Albert Road and on the south by Liverpool Street.

The park was designed by Norman Weekes, Sir John Sulman (1927 design resolution), Alfred Hook, W. G. Layton and I. Berzins and was built from 1810 to 1927. Historically, it has also been known as Sydney Common, Government Domain, The Common, The Exercising Ground, Cricket Ground and Racecourse. Hyde Park is owned by the City of Sydney and the Land and Property Management Authority, an agency of the Government of New South Wales. It was added to the New South Wales State Heritage Register on 13 December 2011.

It is the southernmost of a chain of parkland that extends north to the shore of Sydney Harbour via The Domain and Royal Botanic Garden. Around the park's boundaries lie various buildings housing the Supreme Court of New South Wales, St James Church, Hyde Park Barracks and Sydney Hospital to the north, St Mary's Cathedral, the Australian Museum and Sydney Grammar School to the east, the Downing Centre to the south, the David Jones flagship store and the CBD to the west. It is divided in two by the east–west running Park Street.

Hyde Park contains well-kept gardens and approximately 580 trees: a mixture of figs, conifers, palms, and other varieties. It is famed for its magnificent fig tree lined avenues. Sandringham Gardens sit on the eastern side of the park, close to the intersection of Park Street and College Street.

== History ==
At the time of European settlement in 1788, the local Aboriginal people hunted ducks in the swampy marshes that were to become Hyde Park.

Hyde Park is also understood to be the site of an important Aboriginal contest ground which is a part of the greater Aboriginal history of Sydney. Until the mid-1820s, Aboriginal people travelled from all over Sydney and as far away as the Hunter and the Illawarra, to gather at a ceremonial contest ground to the south of the city. The exact location of this site of ritualized conflict settlement is unclear. Described as lying between the road to Botany Bay and the Brickfields, it was probably near Hyde Park South. Bloody fist fights involving up to 100 people, spearings and beatings were used to resolve conflicts at the Brickfields contest ground. These were observed and recorded by visiting Russian sailors in 1814, and again 10 years later by the French explorers Dumont d'Urville and René Lesson on their voyage of Coquille.

The valley of the Tank Stream was cradled between two slightly elevated sandstone and shale ridges which ran down to the harbour to form Dawes Point and Bennelong Point on each side of Sydney Cove. The Tank Stream itself was only a tiny rivulet which rose in marshy ground skirting the western slopes of the ground which later became Hyde Park. The seepage from the bed-joints of the underlying sandstone around the upper portion of its catchment, which headed about the centre of the park, filtered through the soil to form a definite channel near King and Pitt Streets. The area now occupied by Hyde Park was relatively flat, rising slightly along the centre and elevated. We know it was timbered, as was the rest of the topography, from the early drawings of the settlement. Sydney J. H. Maiden, director of the Botanic Gardens, has suggested that the dominant species were probably white or brittle gum (Eucalyptus micrantha), blackbutt (E.pilularis), bloodwood (Corymbia gummifera), Port Jackson figs (Ficus rubiginosa), Bangalow palms (Archontophoenix cunninghamiana), cabbage tree palms (Livistona australis) and smooth-barked white apple (Angophora costata), with an understorey of tea tree (Leptospermum sp.), wattle (Acacia sp.) and NSW Christmas bush (Ceratopetalum gummiferum).

From 1788 this was a place where soldiers could be quickly assembled in case of a convict rebellion. It was probably the site of a bloody battle between Aboriginal people and Europeans for control of land around Sydney.

Before Governor Phillip departed from the settlement in December 1792, he had drawn a line from the head of Woolloomooloo Bay to the head of Cockle Bay (now Darling Harbour) and noted in writing on the map that no land within the line was to be leased or granted and should remain the property of the Crown. In subsequent years this directive was whittled away. King granted leases in the town, Foveaux had begun to issue grants, Macquarie was to extend the grants.

The area of Hyde Park however, fell largely within this line, and became regarded as a sort of "Common" on the edge of the town. It had quite a different status to the Governor's Domain, which became the Botanic Gardens. It was land that belonged to the people, rather than to the Governor or his officials. The settlers grazed their animals on it and used its brush and trees as firewood. It was gradually denuded of vegetation. By 1810 it would have been a relatively open, elevated space and by then it would have had views out to the north east across Woolloomooloo to the harbour. Early on there were shingling parties and saw pits operating in the vicinity. It was known as "the Common" even before Governor Macquarie defined its size and use by his proclamation of 5 October 1810. His 83rd regiment had established a camp there while waiting for more permanent accommodation, on the southern end near the brickfields.

Later it became the colony's first sports centre and racecourse. Prize fights and cricket matches were held here. In 1803 cricket was introduced on The Common by British officers. This game became an obsession and the area served the game from 1827 to 1856.

=== Developments from 1810 to 1830 ===
Before 1810 the area was known as "The Common," the "Exercising Ground", "Cricket Ground" or "Racecourse". Macquarie, on 11 February 1810, formally reserved it as open space, the first public park set aside in Australia. He formally defined the park as bounded in the north by the NSW Government Domain, on the west by the town of Sydney, on the east by the grant to John Palmer at Woolloomooloo and on the south by the brickfields.

Macquarie named it "Hyde Park" after the Hyde Park in London, north-west of Westminster, near Buckingham Palace (which had once belonged to the Manor of Hyde and which was seized from the Abbey of Westminster by Henry VIII for a forest hunting reserve in 1536). Macquarie's naming and formal definition of the park was part of his town planning policy. He named the streets and regularised their courses, erected a wharf in Cockle Bay, relocated the Market Place and planned other improvements in the town, as well as defining Sydney's first major park and formalising its use "for the recreation and amusement of the inhabitants". He also added another use for the park, "as a field of exercise for the troops". His proclamation acknowledged the previous uses of the area.

Ten days after Macquarie named it Hyde Park it was the venue for Australia's first organised horse race and it was used for races through the 1820s. At that time it was much larger, marking the outskirts of Sydney's southern settlement. The park was used as Sydney's racecourse from 1820 to 1821. Whittaker adds that as well as being a popular cricket venue in the 1820s it was also popular for informal children's games.

It was delineated only as a space at the end of Macquarie Street, where the military held parades, and townspeople cut firewood and carted off soil. It became a favourite place for cricket, a playground for local school boys, a racecourse and – with its slightly elevated position – a promenade cites Hyde Park as being Sydney's cricket ground from 1827 to 1856.

In 1811 Macquarie framed further regulations to secure the space for public recreation. He closed access across the park to the Brickfields beyond, forbade carts to cross it, or cows, sheep, goats and pigs' to graze upon it, and ordered that no cattle headed for markets near Darling Harbour were to be driven across it. He caused a fence to be made between the park and the brickfields and directed that carts carrying bricks or pottery should go through the turn-pike gate in George Street. He directed that all traffic crossing the park was to use the new line of road along the route of Liverpool Street to South Head Road (or Oxford Street). This roadway then defined the southern boundary of Hyde Park.

The northern boundary was at first defined by the edge of the Governor's Demesne (Domain), which the Macquaries came to regard as their personal pleasure grounds. Macquarie himself directed the building of Hyde Park Barracks (1817–19), St James' Church (1820) and the Law Courts (1819–28) at the northern end of Hyde Park, using Francis Greenway as his architect, with these buildings as fine embellishments to the colonial town, facing each other across a plaza which terminated Macquarie Street. Macquarie blocked the street named after himself at what was later known as Queens's Square and excluded all roadways from the park.

The western boundary was defined as Camden Street, later Elizabeth Street, renamed by Macquarie for his wife, Elizabeth Campbell). It was marked out in Meehan's plan of 1807 almost as far as present day Park Street. This was first a street of scattered small wattle and daub thatched houses, brush and grass trees. These were gradually replaced by more substantial houses in the next four decades. It became a fashionable residential street, with elegant terrace houses overlooking the maturing Hyde Park.

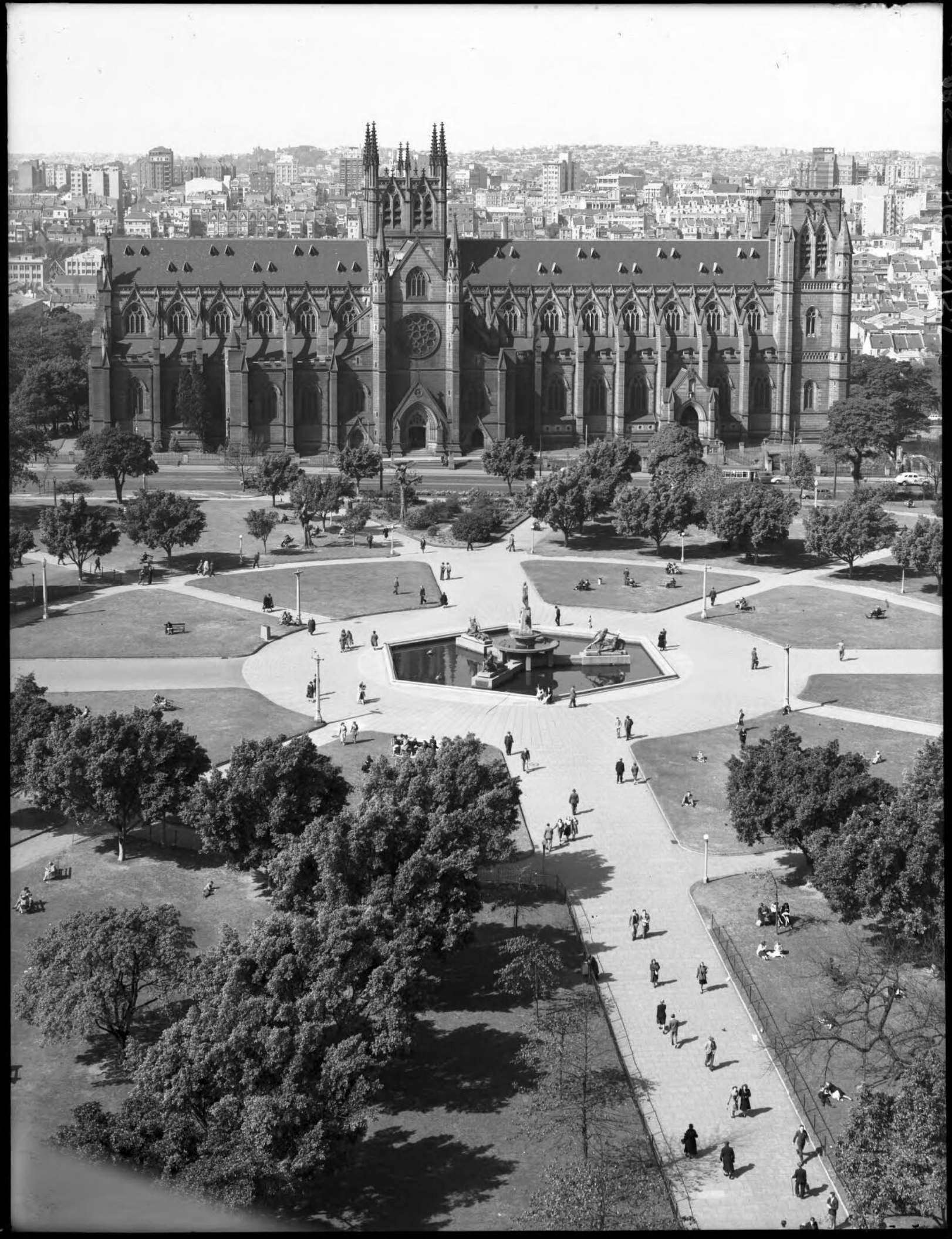
Avenue in Hyde Park, circa 1935, showing St Mary's Cathedral before its spires were added

The eastern boundary was not sharply defined when the Macquaries departed Sydney in 1821. A map of that year shows a vegetable garden of 11 acres allocated to the Barracks and a site marked out for the Roman Catholic Chapel... "near the rubbish dump". The foundation stone for what would become St Mary's Cathedral was laid in 1821 on a site adjoining Hyde Park's north-eastern side, the first site granted to the Roman Catholic Church in Australia.

Macquarie made no move to have the space planted. He probably had enough difficulty getting the Government Domain in order. However the formal nature of the Queens Square end of Hyde Park made it an appropriate place for Governor Brisbane's Commission to be read to the assembled populace on 1 December 1821.

Francis Greenway, architect to Governor Macquarie, wrote in a letter to The Australian in April 1825 that Hyde Park was to be "given to the inhabitants of Sydney for ever, and to be laid down in the most elegant style of landscape gardening". It would be planted out "in the modern way of landscape gardening, as many of the squares are now in London, the garden enclosed with an elegant rail fence". Lack of cooperation from the Colonial Office in London meant that Greenway's elaborate and optimistic plans for beautifying Sydney were put aside for the time being.

Wrestling and boxing in the park continued, with quoits, folk football, hurling, military drills, a zoo in 1849. In public holidays the park resembled a "side show alley".

From the first attempts at structuring it the site has lent itself to a formal design. Emphasis on a central avenue was given by the 1832 extension of Macquarie Street south through the park and by its flatness. When this street extension was closed for a second time in 1851, its north–south line became a rudimentary public walk (known as "Lovers" Walk'); a derivation from the planted walks in English 18th century urban pleasure gardens (such as Vauxhall Gardens).

=== Developments from the 1830s to 1900 ===
In the 1830s Governor Darling proposed to sell off the park for houses, but his successor Governor Bourke rebuffed the claims of those who desired the park for residential allotments and reaffirmed its status as a park. In 1830 Park Street was extended through the park.

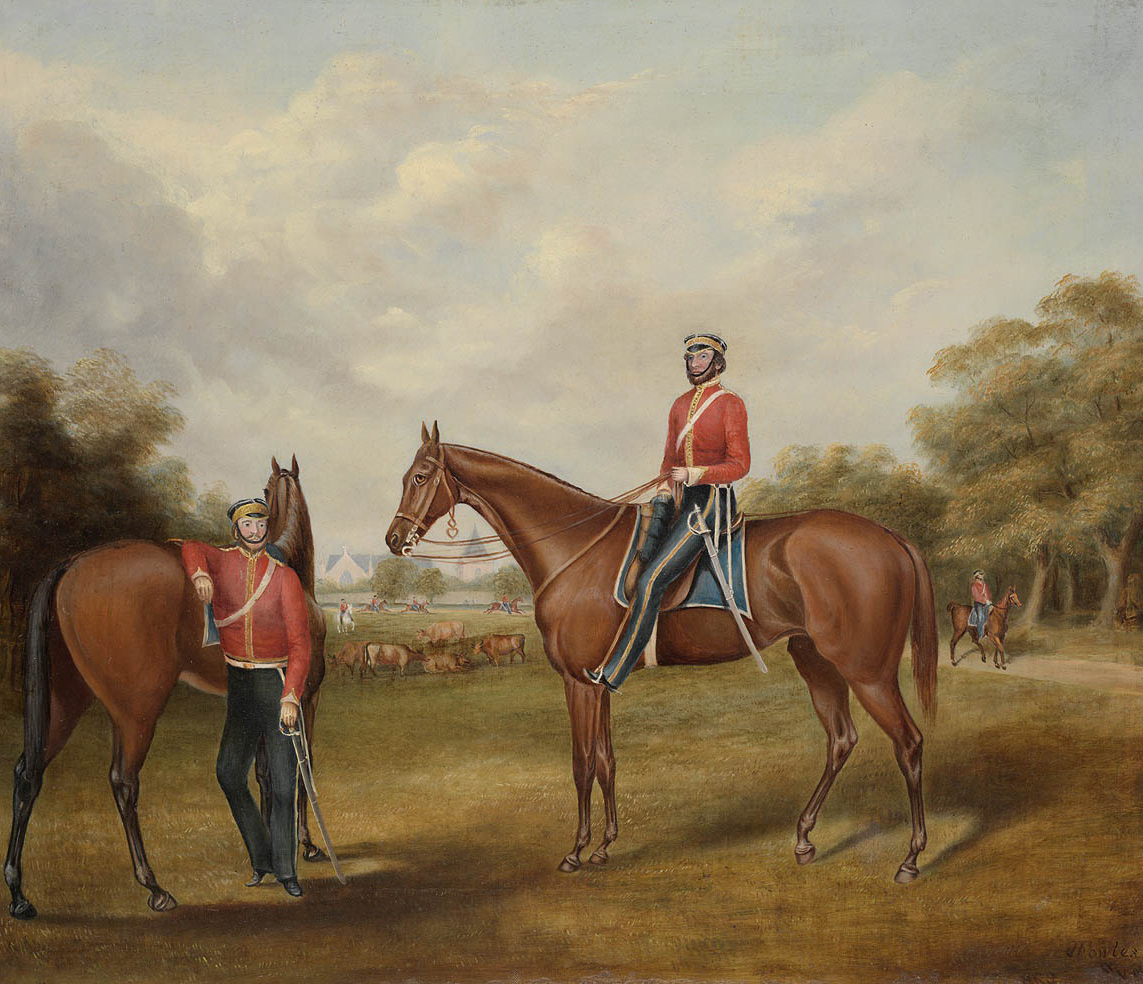
Captain Frederick John Butts 77th (East Middlesex) Regiment of Foot, Hyde Park, Sydney, 1858

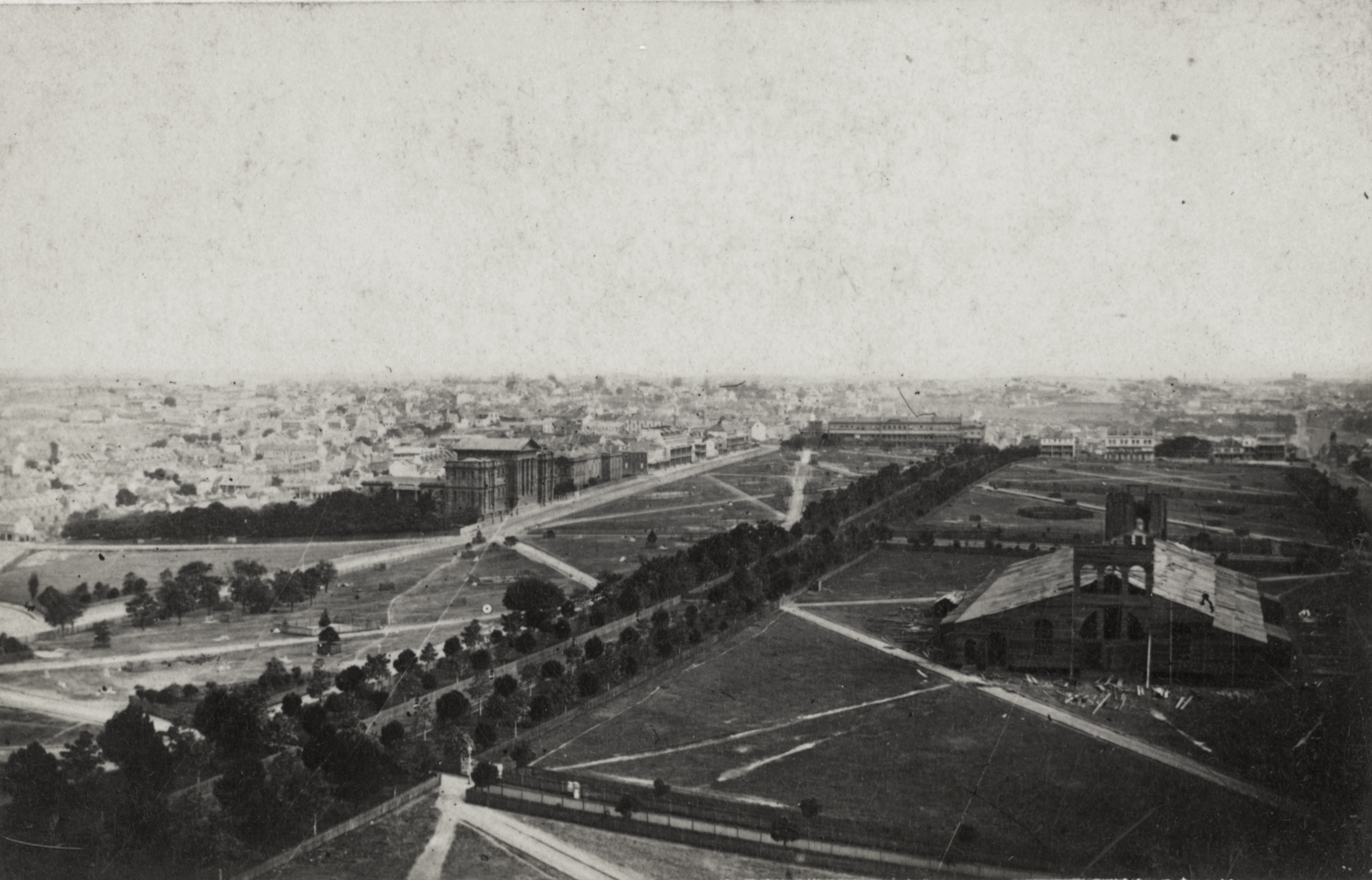
Pavilion under construction for visit of Prince Alfred, Hyde Park, Sydney, 1867-68

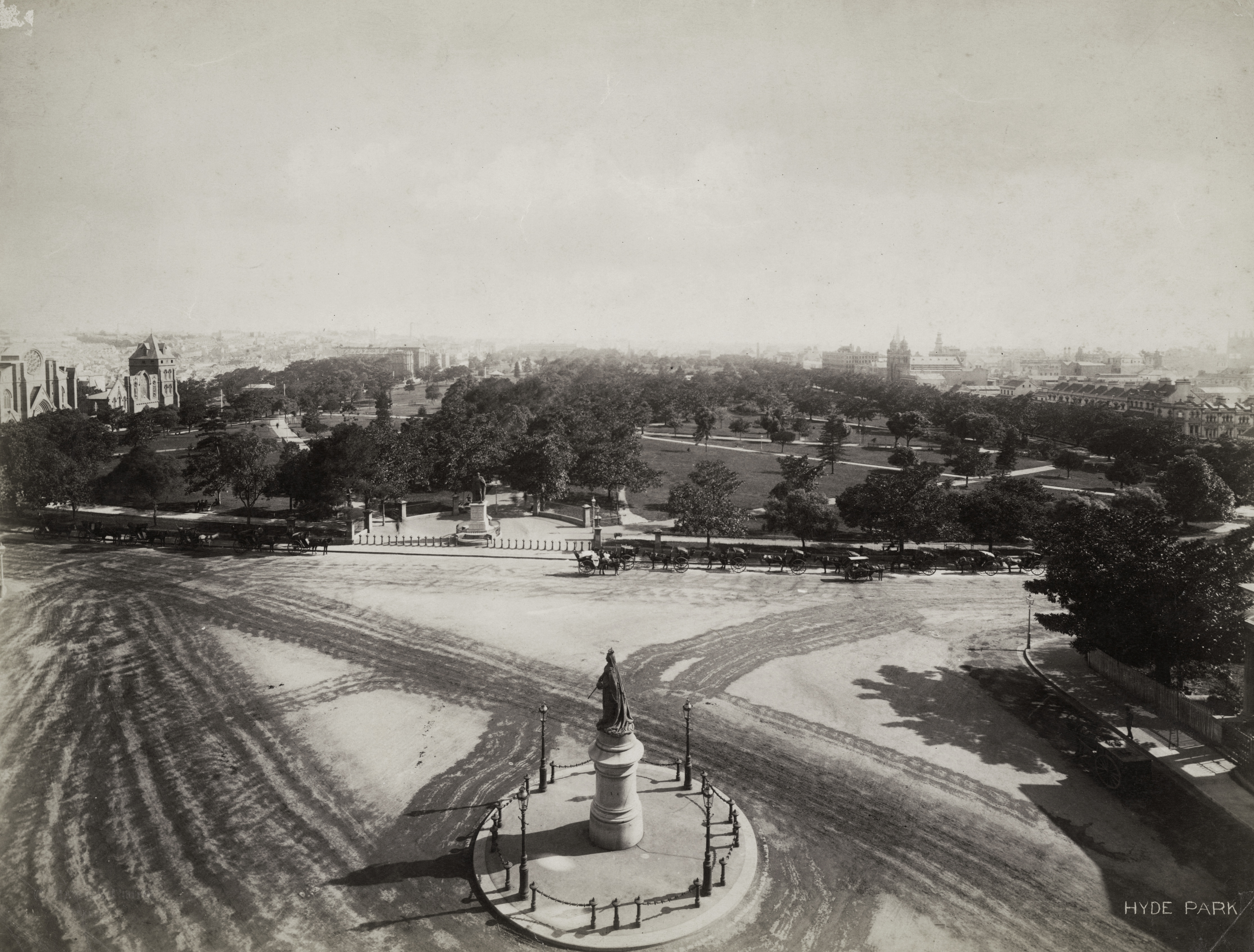
Hyde Park from Queens Square, Sydney, 1888-1890

In 1832 William and Macquarie Street (southern extension) were constructed severing Hyde Park and establishing its central axis. Also in 1832 College Street was built which divided off part of the park, in the area which became Cook and Phillip Parks. Also in 1832 Sydney College was built (later Sydney Grammar School). With the nearby Lyons Terrace (1851) and the Australian Museum (1849–51) the southern end of Hyde Park attracted significant and imposing buildings which increased its importance as a planned open space envisaged by Francis Greenway.

In 1837 the first major planting in the park was undertaken by Superintendent of the Sydney Botanic Gardens, Alan Cunningham. Also in 1837 Sydney's second main water supply (after the first one – the Tank Stream – had become polluted) was Busby's Bore in Lachlan Swamps (later part of Centennial Park). An outlet for water brought to the city from the bore through a tunnel was an elevated pipe in Hyde Park where water carts queued and filled their barrels to sell in the town at 3 pennies per bucket.

In 1846 work commenced on the Australian Museum on the south-east corner of William and Park Streets, probably to the design of architect Mortimer Lewis. This was probably Australia's first prominent museum building, and faced the park.

In the 1850s Hyde Park was a barren expanse of grass criss-crossed with paths and dirt tracks around its perimeter. This is clear in a c.1854 photograph taken from the Mint by mint-worker and amateur photographer William Stanley Jevons in the very early days of photography.

In 1854 the Public Parks Act was passed and a Hyde Park Improvement Committee was formed. Trustees were appointed to determine policy and after 1854 the space gradually became tailored towards a more bourgeois, middle-class ideal of a passive, decorative open space for strolling. It attracted public speakers for a time, until they, like the cricketers, were banished to the Domain to the park's north. Gradually Hyde Park became more a place for passive recreation and more like an "English" garden.

There was increasing public pressure to "improve" the park and plant it. By this time the influence of Scottish/English writer John Claudius Loudon and architect/gardener (later Sir) Joseph Paxton had reached the antipodes – the garden invaded the pleasure ground to form a "gardenesque" (Loudon's term) composition with each of Hyde Park's four quarters divided by a central walk and the whole park by Park Street. Incidents or features such as statues, fountains, ponds and a bandstand were introduced. This broadly reflected the rise of the Public Parks Movement in England, and elsewhere in Sydney – with Parramatta Park being declared a public park in the mid-1850s after much lobbying.

In the 1850s civic monuments began to be erected in the park. The first in 1857 was the Thornton Obelisk. It is also irreverently known as 'Thornton's Scent Bottle' constructed on the park's western side entrance facing Bathurst Street (intersection with Elizabeth St.). This is actually a sewerage ventilator, made to appear like Cleopatra's Needle, an Egyptian Obelisk now displayed in London.

In the 1850s with the coming of responsible government, Hyde Park became a venue for Sunday oratory on political and civic topics, and later election meetings. It was also used for processions and official gatherings such as the ball to welcome Queen Victoria's son Prince Alfred in 1868. Its 19th-century layout featured straight paths rather than curved ones, with the central avenue of Moreton Bay fig trees continuing the line of Macquarie Street southward. Elsewhere lawns were interspersed with clumps of trees and shrubs, water features and a bandstand.

In 1861 planting was undertaken, predominantly along pathways. Moreton Bay (Ficus macrophylla) and Port Jackson (F.rubiginosa) figs were planted in Hyde Park in 1862 (1860 say Mackaness & Butler-Bowden, 2007, 72) on the advice of Director of the Botanic Gardens, Charles Moore. Despite removal of an earlier central avenue of Moreton Bay figs, other specimens of both of these species survive from this era.

In 1866 the parkland was enclosed with a two-railed hardwood fence. A bronze statue of Queen Victoria's husband, Prince Albert, was erected in 1866 five years after his death. This was moved to the Botanic Gardens in 1922 and relocated in front of Hyde Park Barracks in 1987.

After the 1851 Great Exhibition in Joseph Paxton's Crystal Palace, held in London's Hyde Park, and the first Australian Colonial Exhibition in Melbourne in 1854, Sydney also held a more modest exhibition in the Museum to display exhibits destined for Paris (the 1855 International Exhibition) or Melbourne (1861). Victoria also hosted Australia's earliest intercolonial exhibition, in Melbourne (1866–67), again preceding a major international exhibition in Paris (1867). Even if a railway station was not erected on Hyde Park (as had been suggested) or even used at all for an exhibition, the proximity of the railway station and exhibition hall was seen as a necessity for practical and symbolic reasons. Ease of transport was vital for a successful show but so was the powerful symbolism of the "iron horse", with its prefabricated iron railway tracks symptomatic of an age that had produced the Crystal Palace. Encouraged by the success of the first Sydney exhibition of the Agricultural Society of NSW in 1869, Prince Alfred Park was chosen as the site of the grand Intercolonial Exhibition of 1870.

To Sydney's chagrin, the Melbourne exhibition was a great success and the "mother colony" looked anxiously to the day when she could respond with a confident rejoinder. The centenary of Cook's voyage along the east coast of Australia of 1770 was seen as a suitable commemorative event and Hyde Park, Sydney considered an appropriate site. A proposal to erect a new central railway station and use the hall for the exhibition, was considered

A c. 1870 painting by Thomas H. Lewis showed Merry Cricket Club Matches in Hyde Park's north – the park was apparently only planted from Park Street south if the painting was accurate.

In 1871 additional planting was undertaken. In 1876 the parkland was redefined and enclosed with a dwarf stone wall and iron palisade fence. In 1878 Hyde Park was formally delineated, its corners demarcated with gates and sandstone piers surmounted by gas lamps. In 1878 the Great Synagogue was built on Elizabeth Street facing Hyde Park. Beyond (i.e. south of) the Synagogue the character of Elizabeth Street became somewhat less exclusive. By 1900, pubs and the odd private club – including Tattersall's bookmakers club – were a feature of the street. In 1879 (on the centenary of Cook's death) the Captain Cook statue was erected, on a stone base that had been erected in 1869. It stands on the highest point in the park. Its sculptor was Thomas Woolmer who was prominent in the English pre-Raphaelite movement and who spent several years in Australia. From 1878 to 1896 Sydney Botanic Gardens Director Charles Moore was appointed a trustee of Hyde Park. A Cook's pine tree (Araucaria columnaris) flanks the statue.

In 1881 the Frazer Memorial Fountain, one of two donated to the city by merchant and MLC John Frazer (the second fountain is in the middle of Prince Albert Road at the intersection with Art Gallery Road and St Mary's Road). The fountain was designed by John F. Hennessy as assistant to the City Architect, Charles Sapford) was sited at Hyde Park on the corner of Oxford and College Street. This was one of the first sources of clean water for Sydney and a population meeting point in the park. The original design featured cups dangling from the large water basin for people to take a drink. The taps were bronze and in the shape of a dolphin.

Also in 1888 the Fort Macquarie Cannon (c. 1810s) was placed in the park.

In 1888 the John Baptist Memorial Fountain was sited at Hyde Park, in a different location to its current one near the corner of Park & Elizabeth Streets. Early photographs (pre c. 1910) show it on an "x" intersection of two paths, and surrounded by a metal picket fence. Baptist was an early and influential nursery proprietor in Sydney whose nursery "The Garden" in Surry Hills was successful. He was a generous benefactor, donating a fountain to Redfern Park.

This fountain was commissioned for "The Garden" nursery. It was donated by his family to the City for Hyde Park on the centenary of the European settlement of Australia – at this time Australia's premier park had no fountain. While its origin is uncertain – it seems to be a locally made copy (in sandstone) after an 1842 English design – since the 1830s catalogues of the English firm Austin and Seeley had carried descriptions of fountains made of artificial stone and J.C. Loudon had advocated installing jetting fountains. A popular theme was three dolphins or carp on rockwork, their tails holding up the shell-shaped basin.... It also appears to be the earliest surviving ornamental (cf. drinking) fountain in Sydney. Elizabeth Bay House's fountain is believed an earlier import. Government House's and Vaucluse House's – almost identical – were installed in the 1860s. In c. 2007 the City of Sydney removed the sandstone pedestal (with three triton fish forming a tapering spout) for conservation and safekeeping. The base remains in situ. The current management plan proposes its reinstallation and repair.

In 1897 a bronze statue was erected by public subscription to commemorate the populist politician William Bede Dalley (1831–1888) near the north-east corner of the park near Prince Albert Road.

=== Developments from 1900 to 1930 ===
Director of the Botanic Gardens, Joseph Henry Maiden compiled a 42-page paper on "The Parks of Sydney" which he delivered to the Royal Society on 4 June 1902. Providing a schedule of Sydney's 207 "Public Parks and Recreation Reserves" set aside between January 1855 and April 1902, Maiden dealt with their administration, and how they were (or should be) planted, fenced and provided with paths, roads, seats, lights and other facilities, such as latrines, which were now provided "for women and children" in the Botanic Gardens, but not yet "in our parks, so far as I am aware". Maiden stressed that above all, 'in this democratic country, parks "should be inviolable". Their inalienability had to be rigorously guarded. He noted that "the battle of Hyde Park has been fought and won. Hyde Park will be immune from the builder and the railway constructor for a century, and if for so long, then it is safe for all time. For each generation is wiser than the preceding one...".

After addressing the Royal Society, Maiden was asked by Sydney Council to report on the state of the reserves within the city. He furnished an interim report in July 1903, before he had inspected Prince Alfred and Moore Parks, but many of his suggestions were of a general nature. The council should appoint a superintendent of parks: "trained professional gardeners, not labourers or handy men" should comprise the core of the staff; a nursery and depot were required; etc. With improvements, Elizabeth Street could become "the noblest street in Sydney"...More latrines were generally needed, and if "a convenience for females" were provided in Hyde Park, say near Park Street, it would, I feel sure be a boon'. His report went to Council in August 1903.

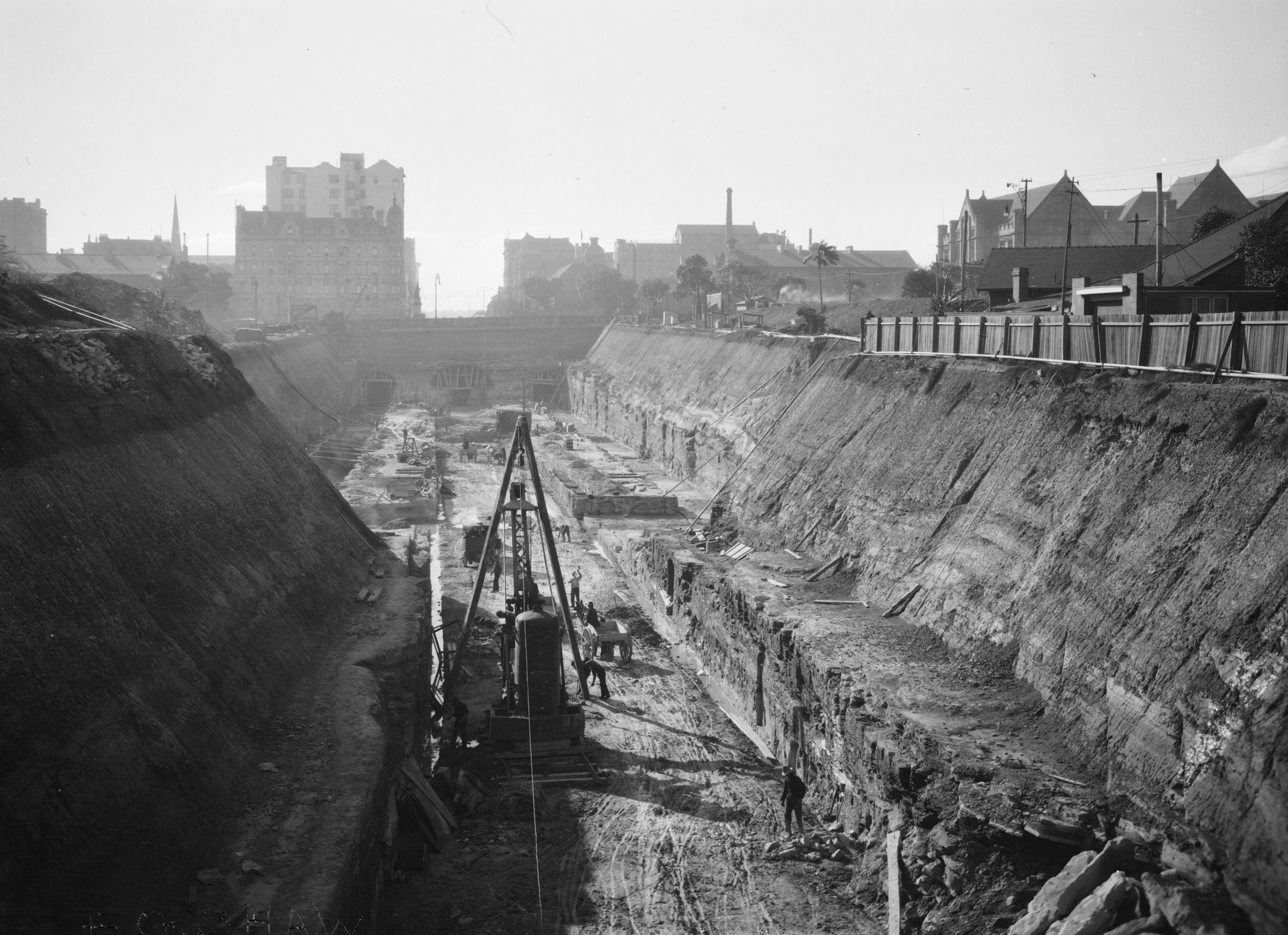
Open cut for underground rail looking towards Macquarie Street, Hyde Park, Sydney, 1923

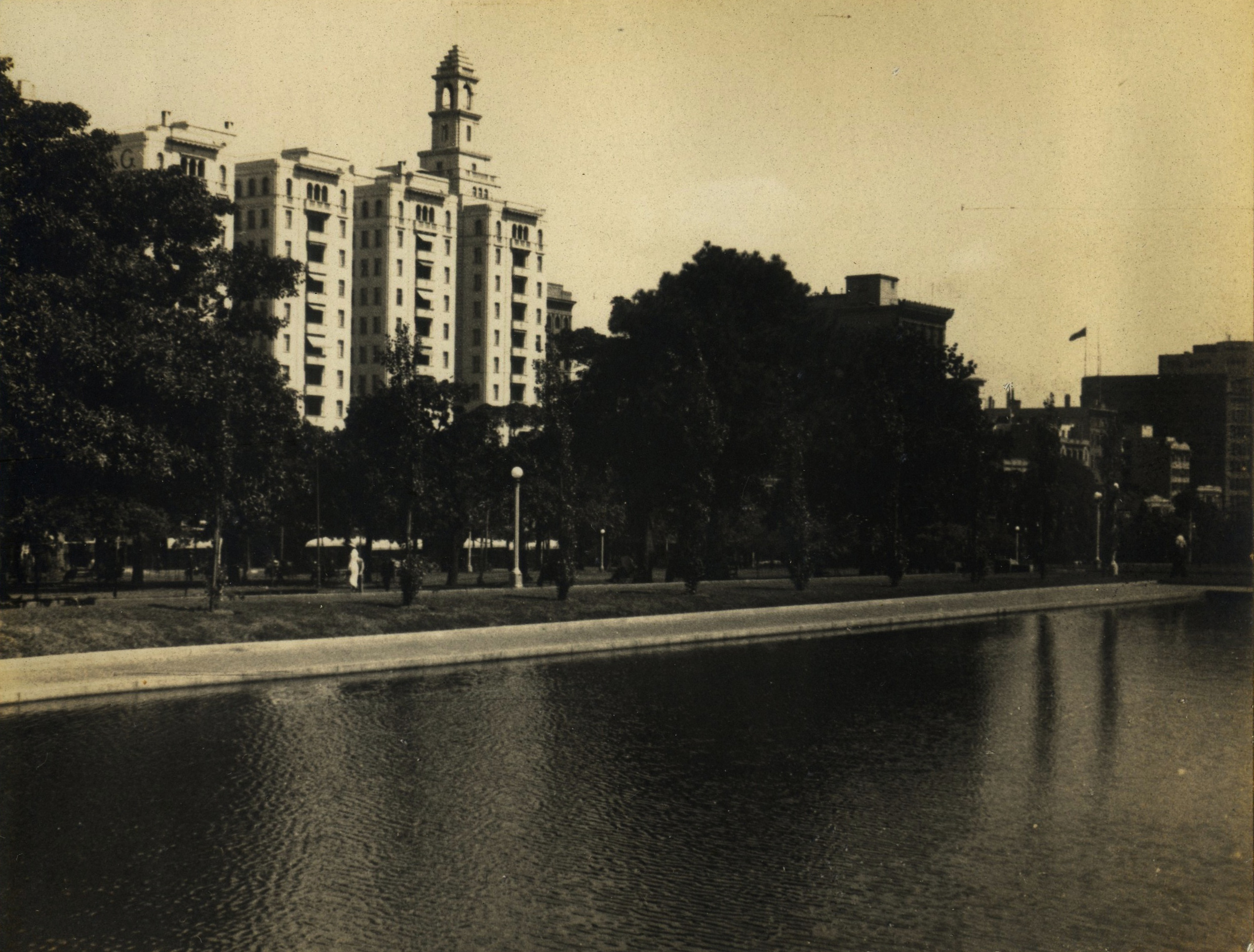
The park in 1930

Control of Hyde Park was vested by the Department of Lands in the then Sydney Municipal Council in 1904. A programme of upgrading began. By 1905 illumination of the whole of Hyde Park had been completed.

In 1908 Hyde Park was redefined following the widening of Elizabeth and Liverpool Streets by 5.5 metres (18 ft) and 4.6 metres (15 ft). In 1910 a bus shelter was constructed.

In 1910 Sydney's first women's public lavatory was built in the park near the corner of Park and Elizabeth Streets. It was considered a "failure" by Council due to low usage and was replaced in 1955. In 1912 the park was redefined following the widening of College Street. Mark Foys Emporium (south-west corner of Liverpool & Elizabeth Streets) was built in 1909 opposite the park. This was one of the largest and grandest department stores in the city, growing over time to six stories. When trains (i.e. after 1926) were the most popular method of goring to town the store thrived because of its proximity to the underground railway station.

In 1914 the sundial was repaired (its date of erection is not known).

In 1916 Hyde Park was redefined following the widening of Park Street. In 1917 the Frazer Memorial Fountain was relocated to the north-east corner of the Pool of Remembrance. The Emden gun, a four-inch gun salvaged from the German raider ship sunk off the Cocos Islands by HMAS Sydney in 1914, the first Australian naval ship to ship victory and one of the nation's earliest war trophies, was gifted from the Commonwealth Government and sited at Hyde Park on the corner of Oxford and College Streets. In 1919 the bronze statue of scholar, patriot and politician William Bede Dalley was erected by public subscription in the park's north-east near Hyde Park Barracks.

An underground railway for the city was planned in 1916 but did not proceed until 1922. The idea of building an underground rail network for Sydney was first mooted by engineer and Harbour Bridge designer Dr John Bradfield in 1913. Government approved it and in 1916 work began on the first leg from Central to Museum and St James. Part of the park was fenced in 1916, however from 1922 onwards major excavation began and much of the western side and part of the centre of Hyde Park North was refashioned after construction commenced. Excavation began with the felling of the main avenue's Moreton Bay fig trees.

World War I brought a halt but in 1922 the project resumed in earnest. Most of the construction of Liverpool Street Station (now Museum) station was done by horsepower and hand. According to the Sydney Morning Herald, 21 May 1929 the southern end of the park (Anzac Memorial) was a mountain of excavated soil and the south-west corner had been a railway construction site for more than 12 years! This necessitated massive excavations and vast disturbance over five years (1924–1929) involving a huge army of workmen and the moving of an enormous amount of soil, shale and sandstone. This was one of the major urban projects of the Depression years.

The rail system was officially opened in December 1926. The first electric trains ran between Central, Museum and St James.

Following concern about the park's future development during and after the railway construction disruption, Sydney City Council in 1927 held a design competition "for a comprehensive layout and beautification scheme" for a restored and refurbished Hyde Park (along with 'up-to-date lines'). The competition was run probably to allay fears that the park would be closed to the public for years more, as well as to put pressure on the Railway Commissioners.

It was won by architect, planner, landscape designer and engineer Norman Weekes (1888–1972) with a finely delineated design drawn by young architect Raymond McGrath (1903–1977) and influenced by the "City Beautiful" movement. This design evolved with the active criticism of the assessors, architect and town planner John (later Sir) Sulman, architect Alfred Hook (Associate Professor of Construction, Architecture Faculty, Sydney University) and Town Clerk (and closely involved in the park's management) W. G. Layton, who wrote a masterly report assessing the design, pointing out its shortcomings and enunciating the design philosophy followed. Landscape historian Georgina Whitehead describes Weekes' design as an accomplished melange of modern City Beautiful, Beaux Artes and Art Deco inspiration.

Their report stated (inter alia) that a "park laid out on the above lines (a hierarchy of traffic ways, lined with and shaded by trees, expanses of lawn, restrained fountains and monuments) and ... would be dignified, useful, a pleasure to the citizens and an object of admiration to visitors, as they are in the principal cities of Europe. Hyde Park properly treated may thus take its place among those of the leading cities of the world". Weekes' design was simplified. Importing fertile soil was the first priority.

Part of the vision was to place major monuments at each end of the main vista aligned with Macquarie Street, which ultimately saw the Anzac Memorial and Archibald Fountain installed.

In the 1920s the Oddfellows Memorial, an elaborate drinking fountain commemorating members of the Grand United Order of Oddfellows who served and died in World War I, was built near the northern corner of Park and Elizabeth Streets.

The year 1927 also saw the opening of David Jones Department store on the corner of Market and Elizabeth Streets, directly opposite the park and St James Station entry.

The year 1929 saw the Wall Street crash, with reverberations around the world's financial markets, triggering widespread unemployment.

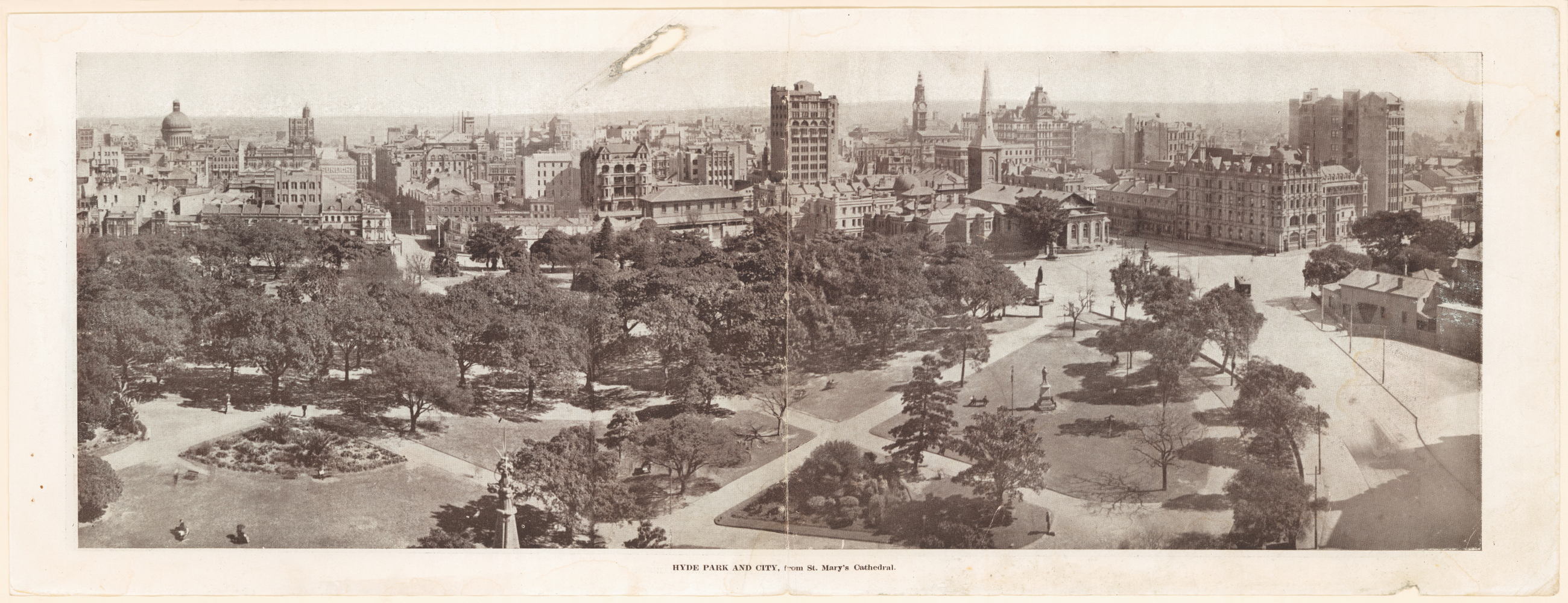
Hyde Park and the city skyline, viewed from St Mary's Cathedral, taken around 1915

=== Developments since the 1930s ===
In 1930 an Anzac Memorial competition to commemorate Australian military personnel who served in World War I was won by architect C. Bruce Dellit. Its construction would take four years.

In 1932 Hyde Park's perimeter walls were built to a new design and the British Lawn on the north part of the park's eastern boundary facing St Mary's Cathedral, Sandringham Gardens and Memorial Gates (on the corner of college and Park Streets (north).

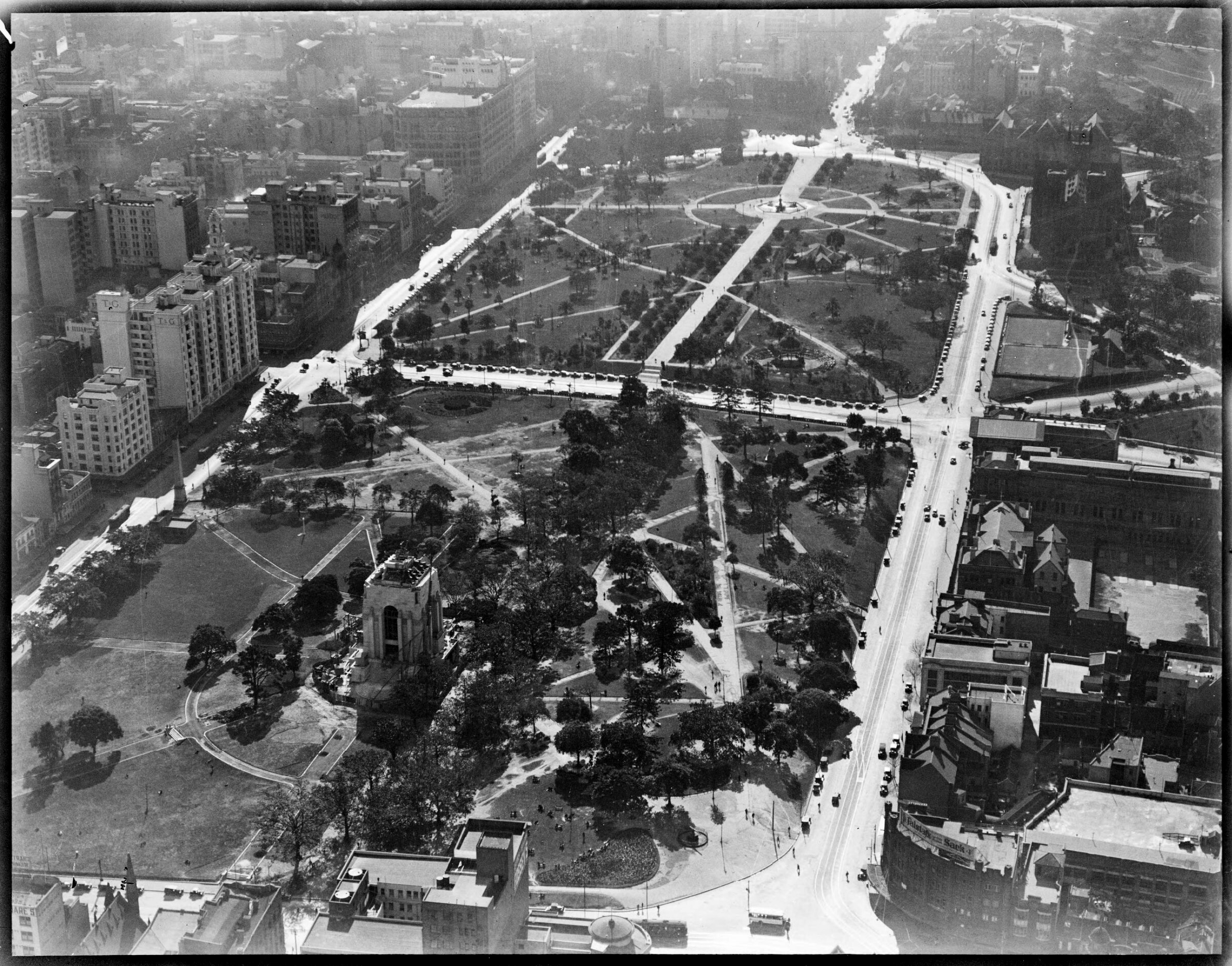
Hyde Park in 1934 from above

Hyde Park and War Memorial, Sydney, August 1934

A climax at the park's northern end is the Archibald Fountain, a flamboyant 1932 erection set in a large pond depicting a bronze Apollo and other gods and mythological creatures such as Poseidon (God of the sea), Diana (the huntress), Theseus and the Minotaur and Jason and the Golden Fleece. This was bequeathed in 1919 to Sydney by J.F.Archibald, to commemorate the association of Australia and France during World War I and was designed by (and regarded as the master work of) French sculptor François Sicard. Archibald was editor of The Bulletin, a newspaper that encouraged writers in the 1890s onward to write about Australia: he himself was a committed Francophile, supporting a near-French styled beard and changing his name twice: from John Felham to Jules Francois (Archibald). He dreamed of a Sydney developed along Parisian lines, with outdoor cafes and music in the streets. Henry Lawson wanted red flags: Archibald red umbrellas.

There was a move to include native plants and E.H.Ward, curator of Sydney Botanic Gardens, became the chief adviser – he was responsible for the planting of the great, dense avenue of Hill's figs (Ficus microcarpa var. 'Hillii'). This ran along the central walkway aligned with Macquarie Street, and was established as its major axis. Desirable attributes were listed: the need for shade, restriction of plant species, open grassed areas rather than shrubberies. Specimen trees were considered 'out of place'; flower beds were tolerated in restraint.

The desired quality was "quietude" – the park would be a haven from the bustle and noise of the city. Trams and buses, routed through the park by Weekes, were eliminated.

Civic monuments were thought appropriate and two of the most successful of the period were attracted – the Archibald Fountain at the northern end and the Anzac Memorial (1930–34) at the southern end: an inspired Art Deco monument of blocky, buttressed forms. With fine sculptures under English migrant sculptor Raynor Hoff's direction, its symbolism departed from neo-classical forms used in many war memorials and incorporated symbols special to Australia – such as the rising sun and figures of brooding servicemen- which gave the monumental strength to the large granite sculpture. Its modernity and the emphasis (sculpture and friezes) on women, made it controversial. Photographer Harold Cazneaux depicted its new setting, "Pool of Reflection" and lines of then Lombardy poplars (Populus nigra 'Italica') in 1934.

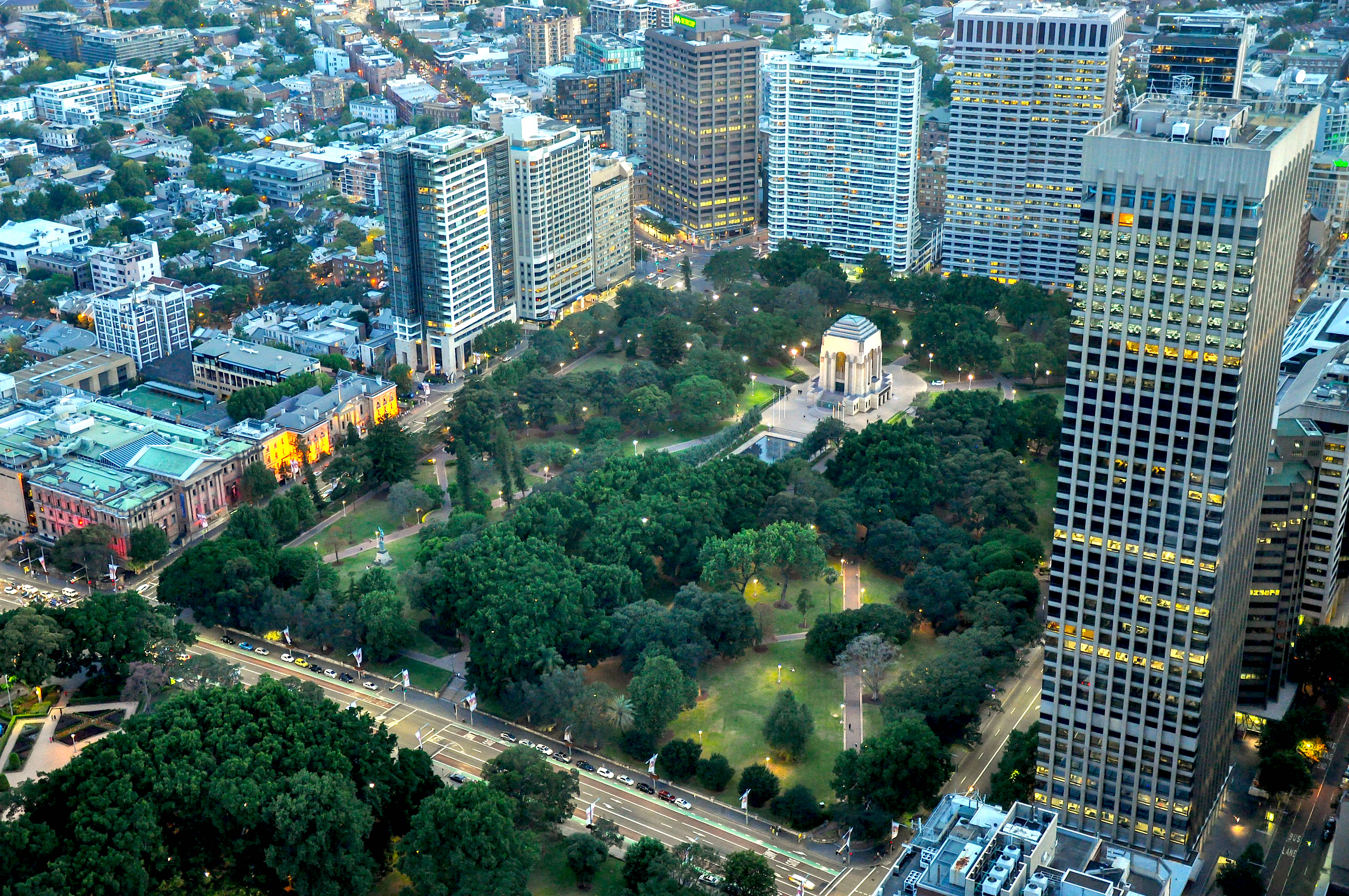
Aerial view of the park

A 1930 photograph shows mostly only small trees in the park with the Hills fig avenue newly planted. Bandstands were scattered throughout the city and were popular for lunchtime concerts, particularly in the depression when unemployed people abounded. One was located near the corner of Park and College Streets (north) – which was demolished to create (in 1951) the Sandringham Gardens and memorial gates to Kings George V and VI.

Much of the construction of the park was assisted (through the 1930s) with labour employed as part of the Depression Relief Fund Programme, which was also responsible for the 1934 construction of the Anzac Memorial's Pool of Remembrance. Also in 1934 the Frazer Memorial Fountain was relocated to its current location, close to the entry steps facing College and Francis Streets, near Sydney Grammar School. In this same year St James Station and Museum Station were constructed, both with entries/exits in Hyde Park south and north.

In 1934 entry and exits to St James and Museum Stations in Hyde Park South and North were built, as the southern portion of Hyde Park was only handed back to Sydney City Council in 1932.

In the 1960s an outdoor cafe was constructed behind (north-east) of Museum Station entry building, by Sydney City Council. The design of the cafe and landscaping were the work of Ilmars Berzins, SCC landscape architect.

In the 1950s Hyde Park saw the introduction on Park Street (in the north-western corner of the park's southern half) of the Long Day Childcare and the Women's Rest Centre toilets for women and their children visiting the city. This replaced the earlier Women's Public Toilets. In 1954 Queen Elizabeth II dedicated Sandringham Memorial Gardens, designed by Ilmars Berzins, commemorating King George VI (her father, the former King) and Sandringham House, the Royal Family's Scottish rural retreat.

In 1983 the Nagoya gardens were constructed in Hyde Park North, commemorating a sister city friendship with Nagoya in Japan. Busby's Bore fountain was erected in the same year and slightly to the north-west near the Supreme Court part of the park.

In the late 1980s the city council saw a need to reassess the park and improve the condition of a number of its elements: plantings, walls, paths and monuments. A draft plan of management and master plan were produced in 1989. Through the early 1990s a works programme was implemented to upgrade paths, conserve monuments and stone walls and built new stone walls along College Street in Hyde Park South. The works depot was removed from the eastern side of the main avenue of Hyde Park north in this period.

In 1999 the men's toilets at St James Station were converted into a cafe facing the park's north-western corner (off Market Street/Elizabeth Street intersection). Nagoya Gardens were upgrade.

In 2004–2005 an arboriculture survey of the park was undertaken, after an outbreak of fungal attack meant the need to remove some of the park's central avenue of Hill's figs (Ficus microcarpa 'Hillii'). In 2006 a plan of management and Tree management report were adopted by Council and the Crown.

In 2012 ongoing tree management works were undertaken. On 15 September 2012, a protest by Salafi Muslims against an anti-Islam film Innocence of Muslims was held at Hyde Park, among other places in Sydney CBD, where around 300 people had gathered. As the crowd started to leave Hyde Park near St James, Public Order and Riot Squad officers equipped with batons and riot shields had already been stationed at the park exit.

On 31 March 2015 a War Memorial to Aboriginal and Torres Strait Islander soldiers was unveiled in Hyde Park South, close to Bathurst and Elizabeth Streets. Designed by indigenous artist Tony Albert it features four 7 metres (23 ft) tall, 1.5-tonne (1.5-long-ton; 1.7-short-ton) bullets and three fallen shells, representing diggers who returned and those who did not. The work was inspired by Albert's grandfather's story of survival and experiences escaping a German concentration camp in World War II.

In February 2016 Sydney City Council proposed restoring the Frazer Memorial Fountain (1881) with a new base, plinth and steps and its impressive filigree works restored. Restoration was expected to take place later in 2016.

== Sporting activities ==
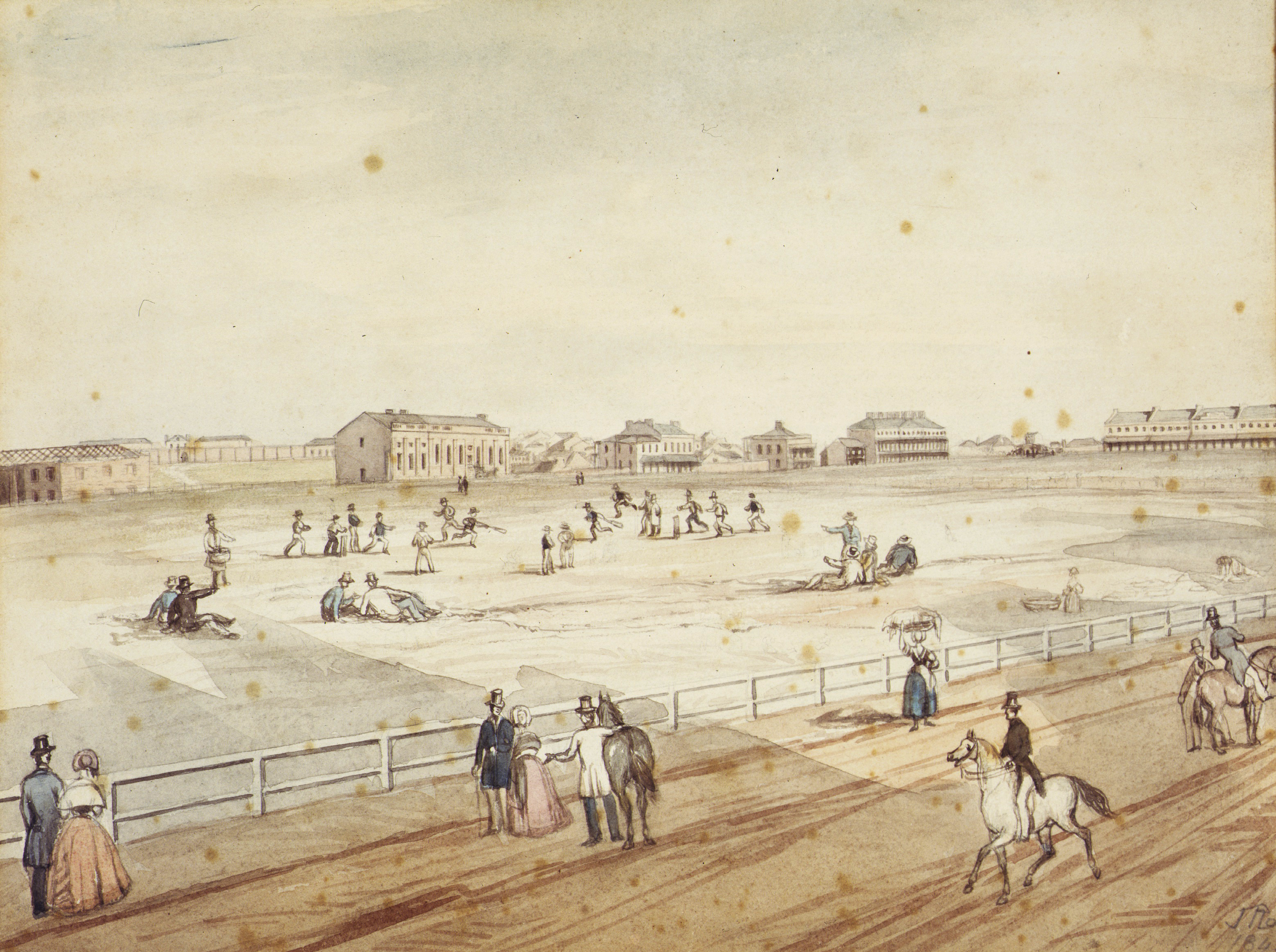
Hyde Park, Sydney, 1842, by John Rae

Many sports were played at Hyde Park, including cricket, folk football, Australian rules football, horse racing, quoits and hurling. Sports people using the park grounds had to share it with the military, who trained on it and practised drill work, the general public, who cut paths across the playing fields, stray dogs, cattle, goats, sheep and other animals. Their activities sometimes clashed. The quoit players, in particular, used an area close to the cricket pitch and often damaged it.

=== Horse racing ===
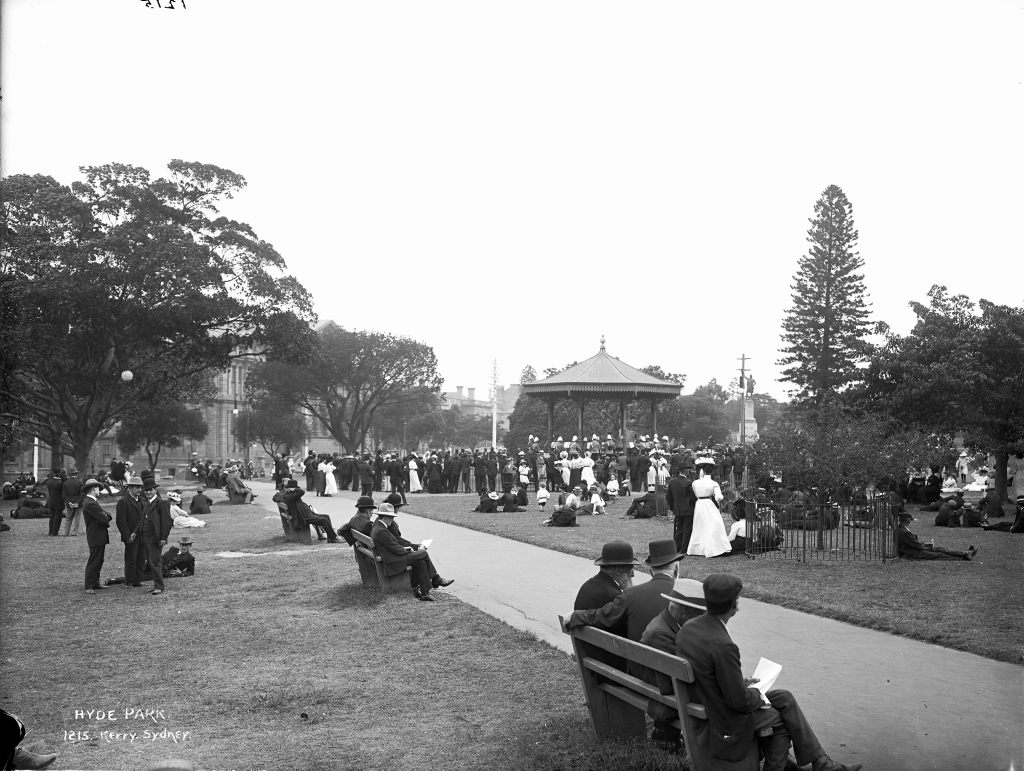
Hyde Park, looking towards the corner of college and William Streets, circa 1900

Seven Arabian horse taken on board the First Fleet at the Cape Colony (now South Africa) were the first horses to be brought to Australia. The first thoroughbred to be brought to Australia was Rockingham in 1799. By 1800 there were 200 horses in the colony which grew to 1100 by 1810. A race ground on the Hawkesbury River near Richmond was probably Australia's first racecourse being used as early as 1806. Match races were run there as part of a holiday at Parramatta in April 1810. Only two days after Governor Macquarie dedicated Hyde Park for 'recreation and amusement' it became the site of Australia's first official horse race meeting organised on 15, 17 and 19 October 1810 by the officers of the 73rd Regiment (Macquarie's regiment). The meetings to devise the rules and organise the event were held in the officers' mess and many of the horses were owned by the officers. The race meeting consisted of a series of heats with weights set depending on the sex and age of a horse. There were also a number of match races between two horses and sweepstake prizes offered. Governor Macquarie himself attended each day of the meeting. This format for race meetings was followed in the colony for the next 50 years. Owners mostly rode their own horses and the courses were marked by flags and posts. Novelty events were often included.

Meetings continued to be held at Hyde Park up until the formation of the Sydney Turf Club in 1825 when they were moved to the 'Bellevue' course. Meetings were also run at Parramatta and Camperdown. The Australian Racing and Jockey Club was formed in 1828 with the encouragement of Governor Darling but the colony could not support two race clubs and both folded in 1831.

=== Cricket ===
Although some research indicates that cricket was played before 1803 at the southern end of the Common near where the War Memorial is today, the first confirmed match took place on the Common in 1803. The players were the civilians and officers from the supply ship Calcutta. The cricket ground was laid out in the north-western section of the park (just behind the current entrance to St James railway station) and all major games were played there until 1856.

The first fully recorded match took place in Hyde Park between the 17th and 39th Regiments on 7 May 1832. However, by the 1850s running problems with other users of the Park, the public, the military and players of other sports, ultimately caused cricket matches to be moved to the Domain, where similar problems were also encountered.

=== Boxing ===
Organised bareknuckle fights were probably common in the early colony and officers of the NSW Corps were known to have arranged fights between convicts. The first recorded fight took place on the road to Botany about half a mile from the Racecourse in 1814. This would put it near the current location of the War Memorial. As if the boxing bout was not enough, the combatants, John Berringer (also known as John Parton) and Charles Sefton, were first required to run a mile. Both Berrenger and Sefton has been sentenced to death in Britain but had their sentences commuted to transportation to NSW. The fight lasted 56 rounds and was won by Berringer.

=== Australian rules football ===
On 17 June 1865 the first known club football match in NSW took place in Hyde Park between members of the newly founded Sydney Football Club, the colony's first club in any football code. The club's inaugural president was leading cricket administrator Richard Driver. Later in 1865 the first ever inter-club matches were played at Hyde Park by Sydney FC against the Australian FC (a football arm of the Australian Cricket Club). The clubs met once more on Hyde Park in 1866. Both clubs confirmed in 1866 that they had adopted football under the Victorian rules from Melbourne (Australian rules football). These were the only known matches of any football code ever played on Hyde Park.

In 1856, Hyde Park was turned into public gardens and sporting activity all but ceased. Cricket and football clubs had to find other places to play. Cricket was played at the Domain and both sports were also played at Moore Park and the Garrison Ground (now the Sydney Cricket Ground).

== Description ==
Interactive map

Hyde Park is in the City of Sydney's south-centre, lying broadly on the ridge that runs south–north to Bennelong Point and forming the city's eastern "edge". The park is broadly flat, though sloping slightly east and west to the adjacent streets (College & Elizabeth Streets). The park is pock marked with drain lids, many of which lead down to Busby's Bore, the first large-scale attempt at a water source system after backing-up the Tank Stream, the Sydney colony's primary water source. Busby's Bore was built between 1827 and 1837 using convict labour and fresh water from Lachlan Swamp (later known as Centennial Park) to the city.

Hyde Park is broadly rectangular with a rounded northern end. It is bisected east–west by Park Street and ringed by other major city streets (Liverpool and College Streets, Prince Albert Road, St.James' Road, Elizabeth Street) and stands in contrast to the closely built-up environment of the city around it. Some features of its landscape design include shaded avenues, green sward areas and monuments, providing a sense of the histories of Sydney and of Australia. The park is centred on a shaded promenade under mature Hill's figs (Ficus microcarpa var. Hillii). These trees have dense canopies and now dominate the landscaping and design, despite some having been removed due to fungal infection in recent years. The Archibald Fountain is situated at the northern end of the park, opposite the Anzac Memorial, which sits at the southern end. These two monuments are key features of the park's design and character.

The Park is a melange of modern City Beautiful, Beaux Artes and Art Deco inspiration. A series of cross paths, perpendicular and angled to the central promenade, connect city streets to its north, west and south with key streets leading to the suburbs of Woolloomooloo, East Sydney and Darlinghurst to the east. The two major east–west perpendicular paths in the park's north lead from Market Street to the Archibald Fountain, and from this to St Mary's Cathedral. Major perpendicular east–west paths in the park's south run east from Bathurst Street past the obelisk and crossing the northern end of the paved plaza north of the Anzac Memorial and reflective pool (to Sydney Grammar School); and another bisecting the Anzac Memorial and connecting directly with Francis Street to the park's east.

Flights of steps lead down from the central promenade to Park Street which bisects the two halves of the park. Other flights of steps lead diagonally off both north and south-eastern corners off Park Street, the entry opposite Francis Street, as both Park and College Streets are at a lower level than much of the adjacent park (or its ridge). Broadly both halves (running north–south) of the park are grassed areas, with scattered trees mostly framing and following cross paths. Wide paved areas surround both the Archibald Fountain and the Anzac Memorial. A rectangular Pool of Remembrance is set among a wide paved area north of (and on all sides of) the Anzac Memorial, the pool's edges being lined with fastigiate poplar trees (Populus alba 'Fastigiata' which replaced earlier Lombardy poplars (P. nigra 'Italica').

A series of monuments throughout the park form features of different compartments, as follows: (NB: this may not be complete list):

North-west (St.James' Road to Park Street)

- St.James Station entry (northern, to St.James' Road)
- Sundial (date not known, pre 1914, designer?)
- Busby's Bore Fountain (1962, John Byrom)
- The Nagoya Gardens (1964, designers?, upgraded 1999)
- A giant chess board set in paving (1972, designer?)
- A former toilet block, now a cafe (1999) backing onto an entry/exit (to Market Street) of the St James underground Railway station (1934)
- F. J. Walker Memorial Fountain – (1961, Gerard Havekes)
- John Baptist Fountain (c. 1842, relocated to park 1888, designer unknown – likely a home-made copy after an English design)
- Former Tram Shelter (Kiosk)
- Oddfellows Memorial (War Memorial) (near the corner of Park and Elizabeth Streets) (1920s)
- Underground Gentlemen's Toilets (filled/unused) facing Park Street

North-east (Prince Albert Road to Park Street)

- Archibald Fountain
- William Bede Dalley statue (1919, sculptor?)
- Fort Macquarie Cannon (opp. St.Mary's Road) (1810s)
- British Lawn (1932)
- Sandringham Gardens & Memorial Gates (1951 Ilmar Berzins, SCC)

South-west (Park- Liverpool Streets)

- Thornton Obelisk (Sydney Water Sewer ventilator) (1857, ?)
- Museum Station entry building, and cafe (corner of Elizabeth/Liverpool Streets)
- Anzac Memorial
- Pool of Remembrance (1934, Dellit?)

South-east (Park-Liverpool Streets)

- Captain Cook Statue (1879 on 1869 base, Thomas Woolmer (UK)
- Frazer Memorial Fountain (1881, John F.Hennessy, as assistant to City Architect, Charles Sapford) (moved three times since, in the park)
- Emden Gun (1914, a 1917 gift from the Commonwealth Government).

=== Condition ===
As at 9 June 2011, much of the park was dug up in the 1920s to install the City Underground Railway including Museum Station in the park's south-western quarter (with two exits to the corner of Liverpool and Elizabeth Streets and to near Bathurst Street) and St James Station north of the Archibald Fountain with two exits, one to Market Street, the other under St James' Road to its northern side outside the park boundary.

As an open space area, Hyde Park has been subject to various attacks by contending uses: residential, active recreation, passive recreation, infrastructure, etc.). Various encroachments have appeared from time to time, buildings for particular purposes, outlets for Sydney water supply, road widening around and through it and, most dramatically, the huge upheaval of the City Underground Railway construction with massive excavation through its length and breadth (1916 fencing, 1922+ excavation).

Even though it evolved during a period when informal landscape planning dominated the English-speaking world, and even though some informal elements have been introduced to its design, it has remained Sydney's major formal urban landscape. It is this formal quality which gives it its strength and memorability.

Much of the park reflects its 1926 competition design with some modifications between 1927-c.1930. Recent (1990–2010) changes have been relatively minor – one more noticeable one being removal of 13 Hill's fig trees from the northern end (around the Archibold Fountain) due to fungal attack. Another change of note has been removal of the c. 1950s day care/women's rest centre building in the late 1990s and re-grassing of that north-western corner of the southern half of the park. Changes to Gallipoli Gardens plantings around the Anzac Memorial, minor pathway upgrades and recent works to install cycle lane along the park's eastern side on College Street have meant minor incursions and changes there.

=== Modifications and dates ===
- 1788–1810 – clearing for firewood, grazing
- 1810 – fencing; racecourse (originally roughly 22ha/56 acres, including Elizabeth and most of College Street, i.e. 30% larger than today)
- 1830s – extension of Park Street
- 1832 – Macquarie Street extended south through the park
- 1837 – elevated pipe outlet for Busby's Bore water supply
- 1849 – zoo
- 1851 – Macquarie Street extension closed again, "Lovers Lane" walk created
- 1854+ – pressure for passive recreation/improvement, planting, walks; Park Street created bisecting park and four "quarters" formed
- 1857 – sewer vent/obelisk erected on Bathurst/Elizabeth Street side
- 1862 – Moreton Bay (Ficus macrophylla) and Port Jackson (F.rubiginosa) figs planted on Charles Moore's advice. Despite 1920s upheavals, and removal of the original central avenue of Moreton Bay figs, some of these still remain elsewhere in the park
- 1916–26 – major upheaval and recreation of the park after creation of the underground railway loop. St James and Museum stations/entries
- 1927 – hills fig avenue created along central axis
- 1930–34 – Anzac Memorial and Pool of Remembrance constructed
- 1932 – Archibald Fountain and surrounds created
- 1951 – demolition of bandstand, creation of Sandringham Gardens
- 1955 – demolition of women's toilet, creation of Long Day Childcare and Women's Rest Centre
- 196 – Nagoya Gardens created
- 1990–1999 – various modifications to pathways, entries, plantings, creation of cafe in former toilet part of St James Station entry
- 2000 – demolition of Long Day Childcare/Women's Rest Centre
- 2006 – removal of 13 Hills figs due to fungus and soil problems
- c. 2007 – removal for safe-keeping/conservation of sandstone pedestal of the John Baptist Memorial Fountain (still yet to be reinstated)
- c. 2009 – changes to south-east corner (Liverpool/College Sts)
- 2010 – changes to eastern side to accommodate road/cycle path works

== Monuments ==
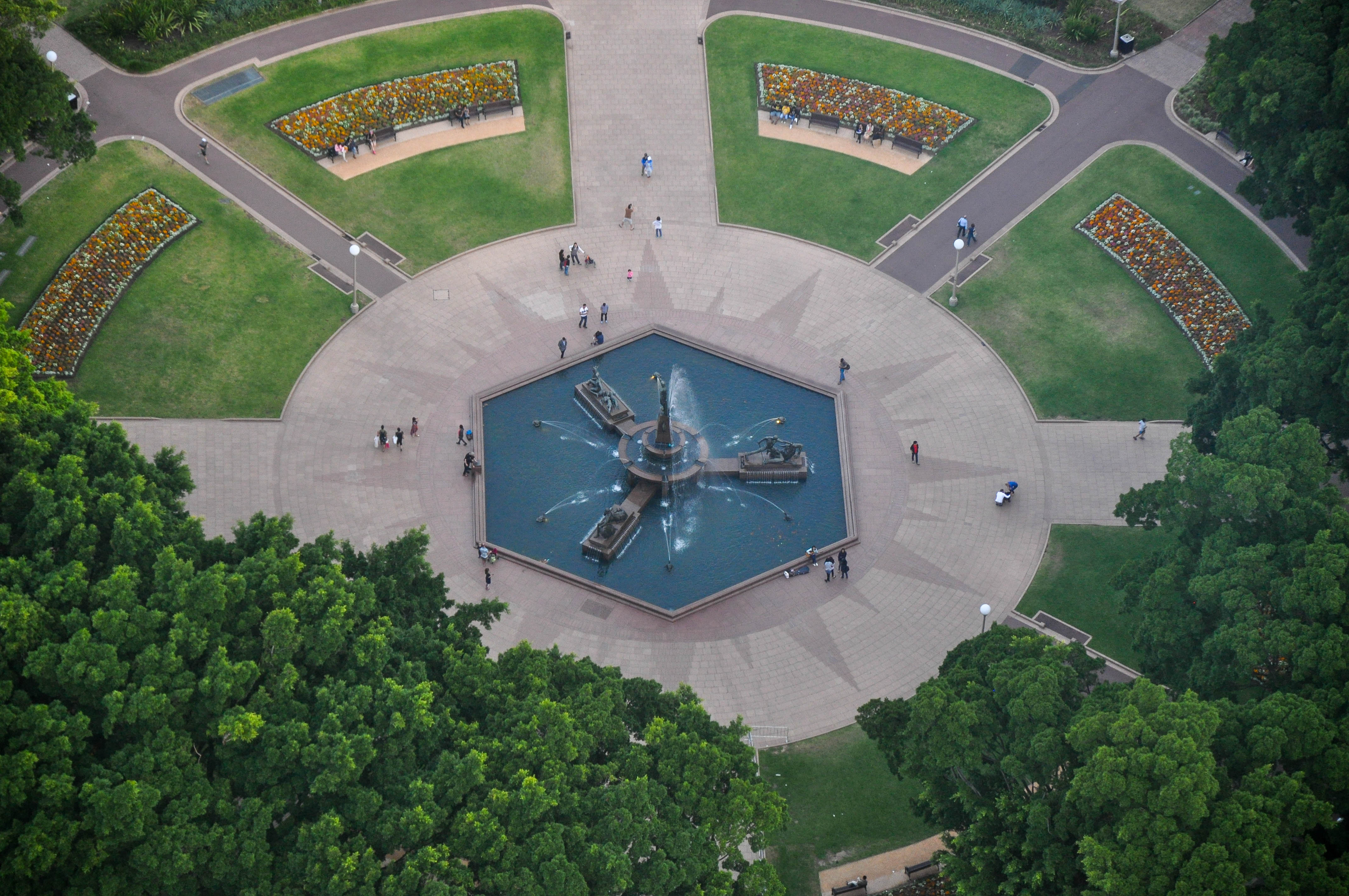
Archibald Fountain

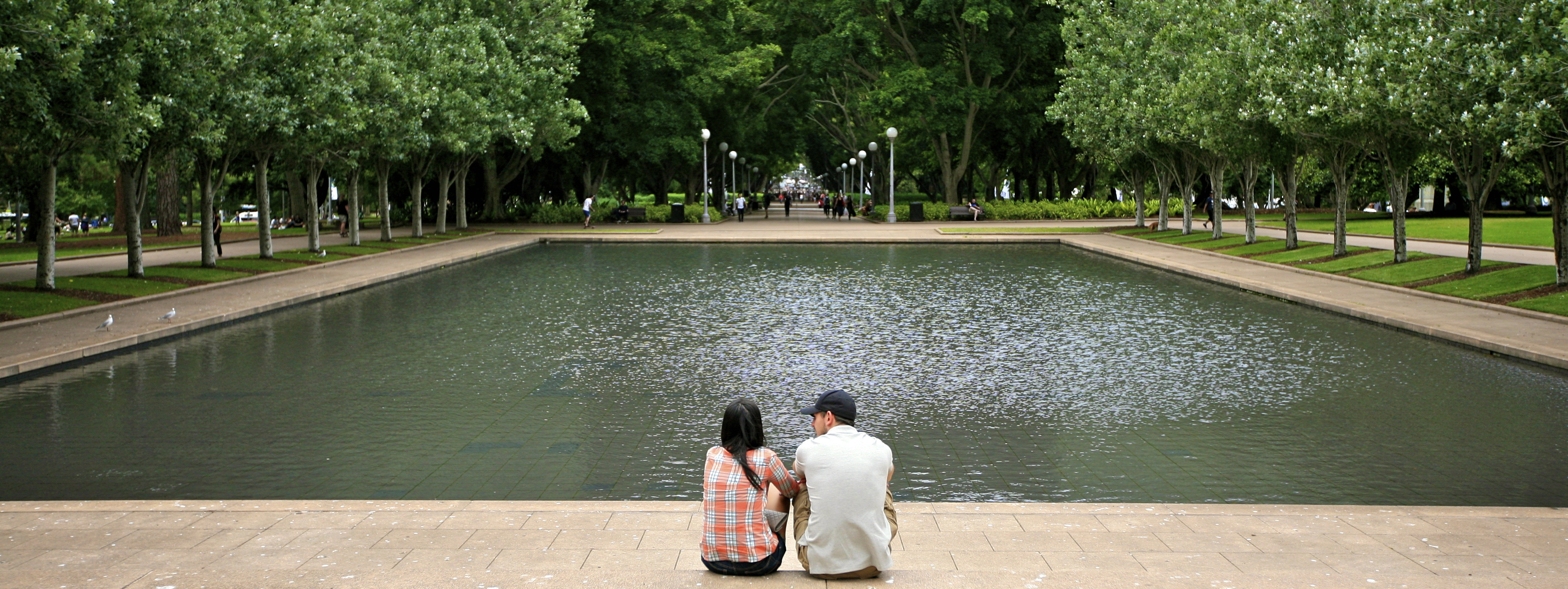
Memorial Pond

The centrepiece of Hyde Park is the Archibald Fountain. The fountain was designed by François-Léon Sicard and bequeathed by J. F. Archibald in 1932 in honour of Australia's contribution to World War I in France. The fountain features in the notable Australian B-grade horror film Howling III: The Marsupials (1987). Also at the northern end are the Nagoya Gardens featuring a giant outdoor chess set and the entrance to the underground St James railway station.

Adjacent to College Street and the Australian Museum lies the Sandringham Garden. This colonnaded, sunken garden was opened by Her Majesty Queen Elizabeth II as a memorial to Kings George V and George VI.

At the park's southern end is the ANZAC War Memorial behind the Pool of Reflection and the entrances to the Museum railway station. A monument consisting of a 105-millimetre (4.1 in) gun from the German light cruiser SMS Emden stands at Whitlam Square, at the south-eastern, Oxford Street entry of the park. It was built as a memorial to the Australian Imperial Force of World War I. Fund raising for a memorial began on 25 April 1916, the first anniversary of the Australian and New Zealand Army Corps (ANZAC) landing at Anzac Cove for the Battle of Gallipoli. It was opened on 24 November 1934 by His Royal Highness Prince Henry, Duke of Gloucester.

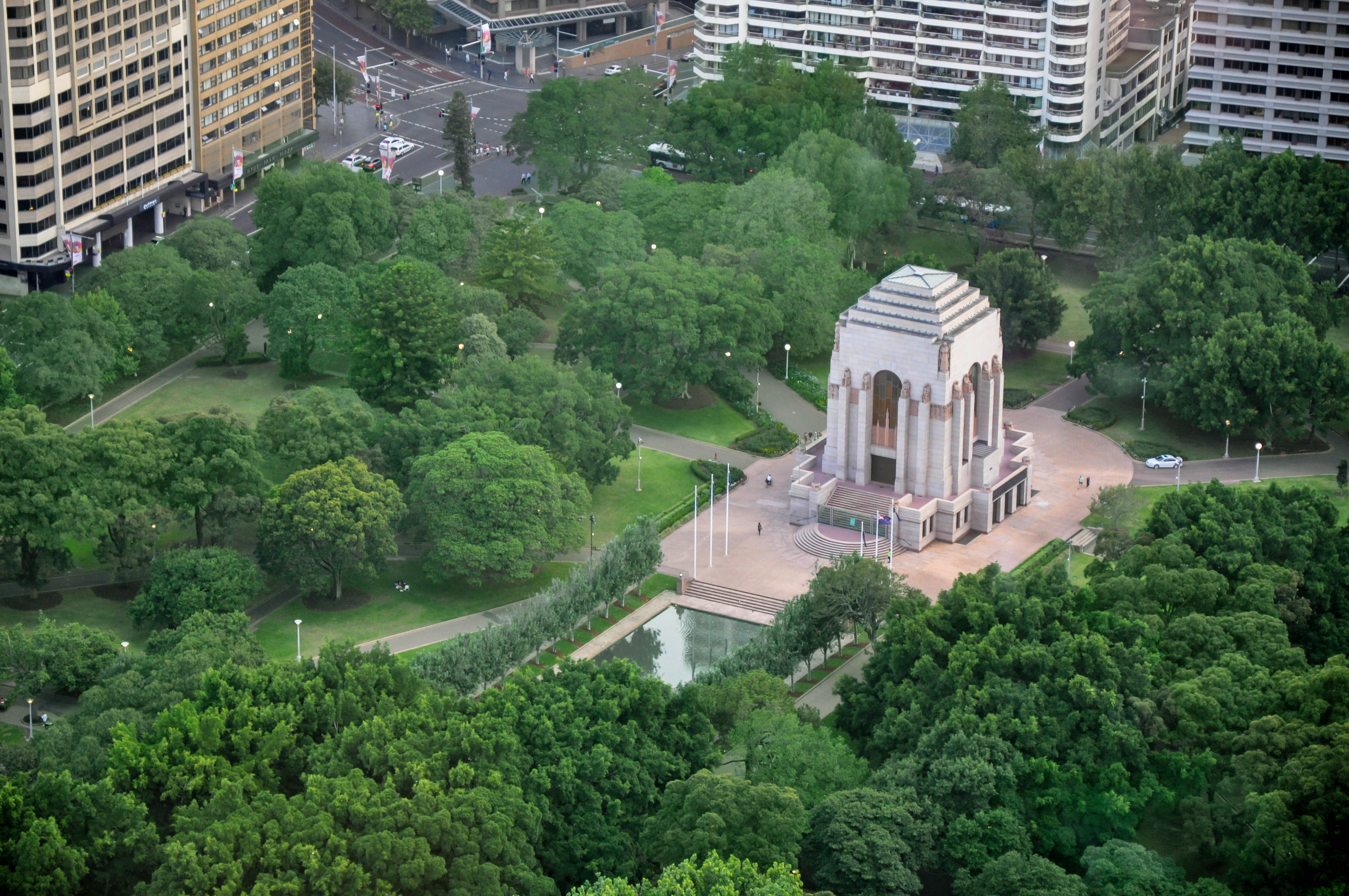
ANZAC War Memorial

Close to the ANZAC Memorial in the southern end of the park is Yininmadyemi – Thou didst let fall, a public artwork that acknowledges the service of Aboriginal and Torres Strait Islander men and women in the Australian Defence Force. The artwork by Indigenous Australian artist Tony Albert was unveiled on 31 March 2015 and was commissioned by the City of Sydney as part of its Eora Journey public art initiative.

The western, or Elizabeth Street side, at the Bathurst Street entrance of the park sits beside the 22-metre (72 ft) Obelisk decorated with Egyptian features. It was erected in 1857 and unveiled by the then Mayor, George Thornton. However, the monument is actually a sewer vent, and soon the joke around town was to call it Thornton's Scent Bottle. Further south from here is another Middle Eastern inspired monument by the Independent Order of Odd Fellows dedicated to the fallen Sydneysiders of the Great War.

In the northeastern sector, of the southern half of the park, there is a monument to Captain James Cook, erected to commemorate Cook's discovery of the east coast of Australia in 1770. The sculptor was Thomas Woolner (17 December 1825 – 7 October 1892) and the statue was cast by Cox & Sons, at its Thames Ditton Foundry, Surrey, England.

== Vegetation ==
An expansive avenue of Hill's weeping figs (Ficus microcarpa), which are the predominant trees in the park planted from the 1930s, run from St James Road to Park Street (Hyde Park North) and continue on to the Pool of Reflection (Hyde Park South). There are a number of Moreton Bay figs and Port Jackson figs. Minority tree species found in the park include:

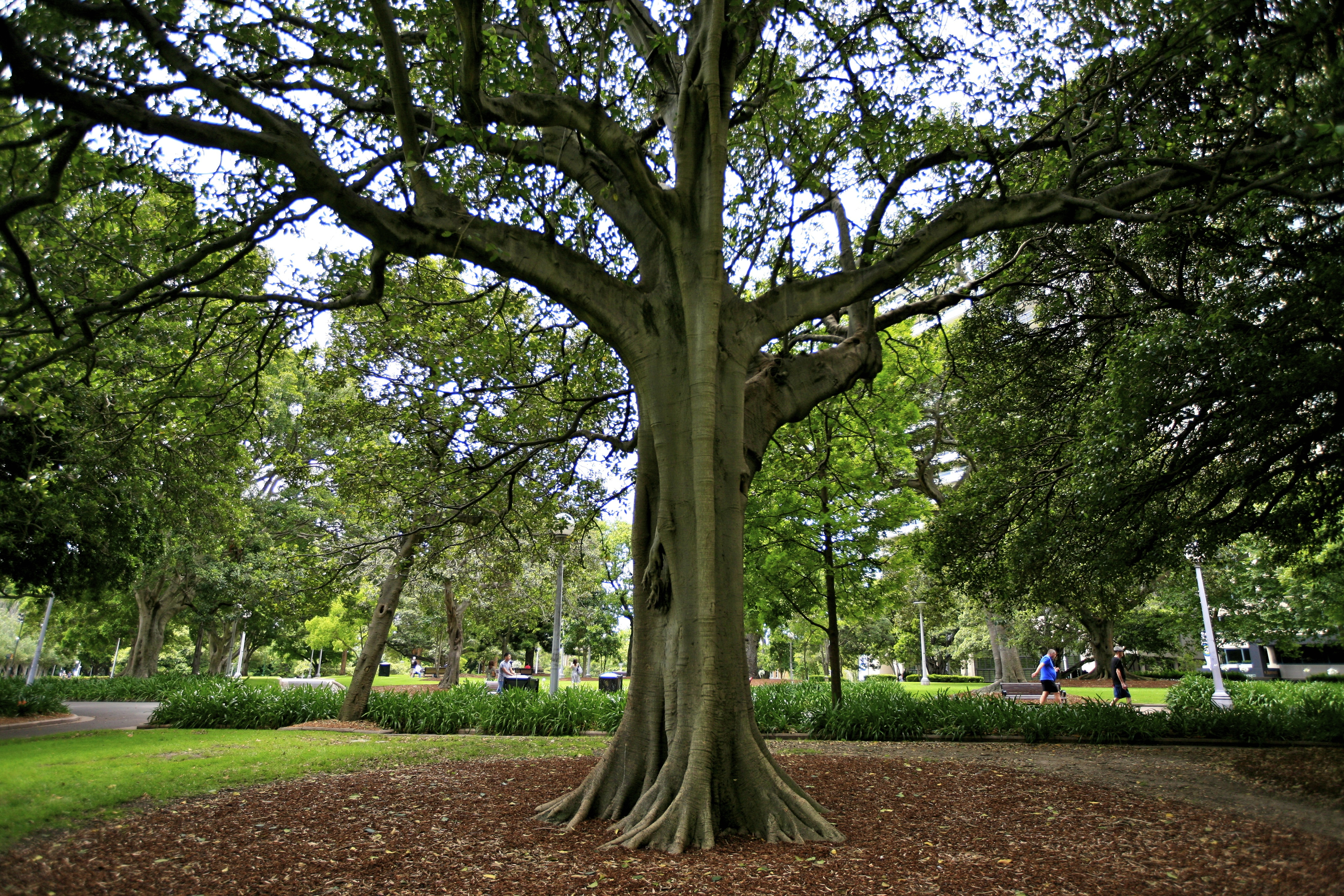
Moreton Bay fig

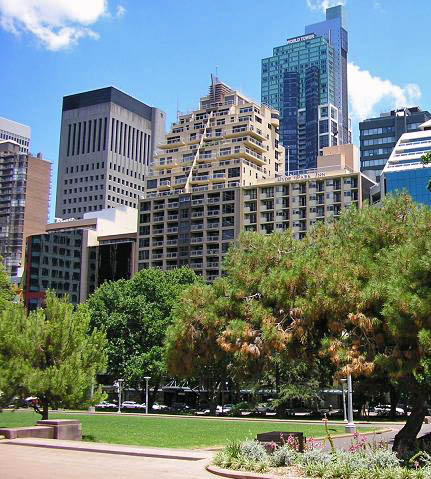
Two conifers in foreground

- Araucaria cunninghamii
- Araucaria columnaris
- Agathis robusta
- Pinus roxburghii
- Stenocarpus sinuatus
- Ficus religiosa
- Lophostemon confertus
- Platanus × hispanica
- Afrocarpus falcatus
- Quercus ilex
- Quercus robur
- Washingtonia filifera var. robusta
- Phoenix canariensis
- Phoenix reclinata
- Phoenix dactylifera
- Phoenix rupicola
- Butia capitata
- Livistona australis

Between 2004 and 2005 a number of disease-affected trees were discovered and felled. Following investigations a significant proportion of the trees were found to be infected with three different fungi. In 2006, a tree management plan recommended the removal of about 230 diseased trees to be progressively replaced over time, and aimed to keep the majority of the park's trees for as long as possible by increasing the ratio of examinations and mending.

== Heritage listing ==
As at 17 August 2011, Hyde Park has State significance as public land (the Australian colony's first common) that has influenced the development of Sydney's layout from as early as 1789, occupying approximately the same site since that time. Proclaimed by Governor Macquarie, it is Australia's oldest designated public parkland (1810), and has been continuously used from 1788 for public open space, recreation, remembrance, celebration and leisure. Hyde Park has contributed to the cultural development of the city as a recreational space encapsulating the principles of a Victorian parkland through the use of a hierarchy of pathways and the strategic siting of monuments, statues and built items. It is of State significance as a demonstration of the international spread of the English public parks movement originating in the mid-19th century. It provides evidence of the influence of transport infrastructure on urbanisation by its upheaval and re-creation after construction of the city underground railway in the 1920s. It was site of some of Australia's first sporting events, and remains the prime open space in Sydney for special events, protests and festivals as it has been since 1810. The Park contains a collection of monuments and sculptures which mark key events and personalities in the history of the State including war memorials and significant artistic works.

Hyde Park, Sydney was listed on the New South Wales State Heritage Register on 13 December 2011 having satisfied the following criteria.

The place is important in demonstrating the course, or pattern, of cultural or natural history in New South Wales.

Hyde Park has State historical significance as Australia's oldest public park. It is a surviving part of the nation's first public common on land consciously set aside as public open space in the urban context. It has been continuously used from 1788 for public recreation, remembrance, celebration and leisure. Its historical development provides evidence of the spread of the public parks movement which saw the emergence of deliberately designed public parks in the mid- to late 19th century, while the influence of transport infrastructure on urbanisation is demonstrated in its upheaval and recreation after construction of the city underground railway. The site of some of Australia's first sporting events, Hyde Park remains the prime open space in Sydney for special events, protests and festivals as it has been since its gazettal in 1810. It also provides a record of some of Australia's earliest involvement in war through monuments such as the Emden Gun.

The place has a strong or special association with a person, or group of persons, of importance of cultural or natural history of New South Wales's history.

Hyde Park is associated with the Aboriginal people of the Sydney Region for its believed use as a contest ground. Hyde Park has State significance for it associations with a number of influential men responsible for the creation, design and development of Hyde Park. Governor Phillip, Governor Macquarie and Colonial Architect Francis Greenway all contributed to activities which contributed to the declaration of the Commonl and its eventual gazettal in 1810, as well as the earliest although unrealised design concepts for the park. Several key personalities in Sydney and NSW landscape design and architecture played key roles in both the design and implementation of the park throughout the nineteenth and twentieth centuries. Among these were the early Directors of the Sydney Botanic Gardens Alan Cunningham (1837) and Charles Moore who provided planting advice that would shape the early development of the park. In the twentieth century designer Norman Weekes, the 1926 design competition winner and competition assessors Sir John Sulman (architect), Alfred Hook (architect) and Town Clerk W.G. Layton were instrumental in the implementation of the redesign and beautification of Hyde Park following the massive excavations and disturbance of the park associated with the construction of part of what later became the City Circle Railway line from 1922.

The monuments and sculptures in Hyde Park not only create a visually interesting outdoor gallery, but bring with them important associations with artists and designers. Among them are French sculptor Francois Sicard and Bulletin magazine editor Frank Archibald (1932 installation of Archibald Fountain), architect C. Bruce Dellitt and sculptor Raynor Hoff (Anzac Memorial), and landscape architect Ilmar Berzins (Sandringham Gardens).

The place is important in demonstrating aesthetic characteristics and/or a high degree of creative or technical achievement in New South Wales.

Hyde Park has State significance as Australia's premier example of a formal public park in a highly urban situation. It is an early example of a park whose design was based upon a public open space design competition with adjustments made by the judging panel. It contains a number of significant memorials, which make important contributions to the aesthetics of Hyde Park. Of these, the ANZAC Memorial and the Archibald Fountain also have independent heritage values. The memorial and the fountain have significant design influence on the layout and physical character of the Park and the City of Sydney, with the Anzac Memorial positioned on a major axis linked to the Archibald Fountain.

The place has a strong or special association with a particular community or cultural group in New South Wales for social, cultural or spiritual reasons.

Hyde Park has State social significance as the setting of the Anzac Memorial which has special association with the families of servicemen and women killed in the Anzac Gallipoli campaigns of the First World War. Additional memorials have smaller scale significance of this nature, such as the Emden Gun

Hyde Park has State social significance to the people of Sydney and NSW as a site of ongoing public recreation and major events, parades and celebrations that have continue to be held there since the park's inception. This significance is emphasised by the fact that these events take place in the state's oldest public park which has been in continuous use since European settlement in 1788.

The place possesses uncommon, rare or endangered aspects of the cultural or natural history of New South Wales.

Hyde Park has State significance as one of only two public open spaces, the other being Macquarie Place, dating to 1810 under Governor Macquarie. It is rare as a formally structured Australian urban park, created in an age when informal park layouts were more common. It contains rare design work in a public space by architect and landscape architect Norman Weekes, while the work of landscape architect Ilmar Berzins is one of only four known surviving works by Berzins in NSW. The other three examples are Arthur MacElhone Reserve, Elizabeth Bay; Fitzroy Gardens, Kings Cross and Duntryleague Golf Course, Orange. Sculptural and monumental work in the park also have State rarity values. The John Baptist Fountain created c. 1842 and erected in Hyde Park in 1888 is the oldest surviving ornamental fountain in Sydney. The Archibald Fountain is possibly the only example of the master work of French sculptor Francois Sicard in Australia.

The Emden Gun has state significance as the first naval trophy of World War One from the Royal Australian Navy's first ship to ship battle and one of only four salvaged from the SMS Emden. It is also believed to be the first gun to be utilised for memorial purposes in NSW and the first naval war trophy of World War One. The Emden Gun has national significance as one of only a small number of war trophies captured by Australia prior to 1916 and the battles of the Western Front due to both the outcomes of those early battles and the inability of soldiers to take much with them when they withdrew from those campaigns.

The place is important in demonstrating the principal characteristics of a class of cultural or natural places/environments in New South Wales.

Hyde Park is an influential public park and open space, much used, loved and copied in other urban spaces in Australian cities and towns.

== Gallery ==
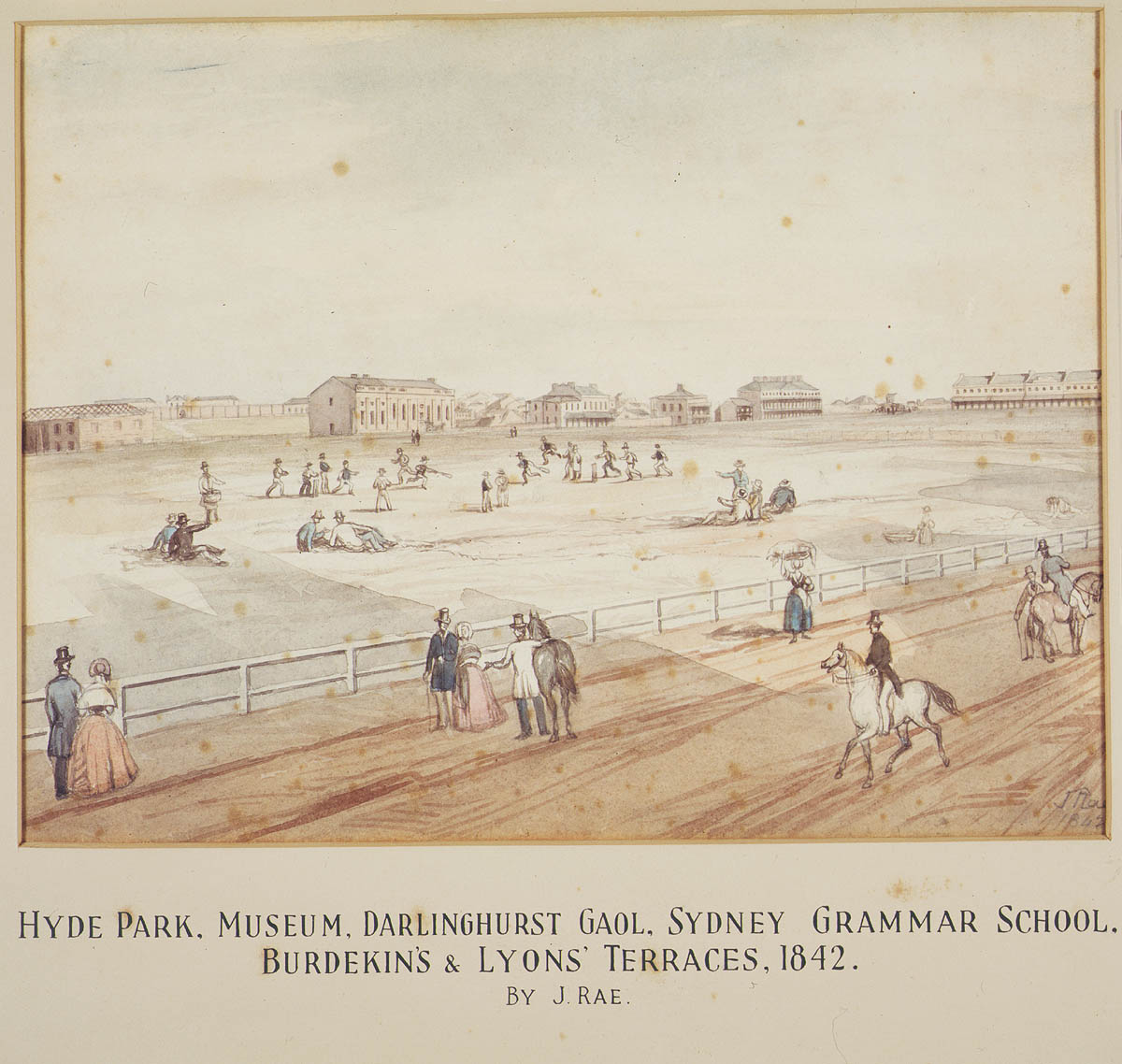
Hyde Park by John Rae (1842)

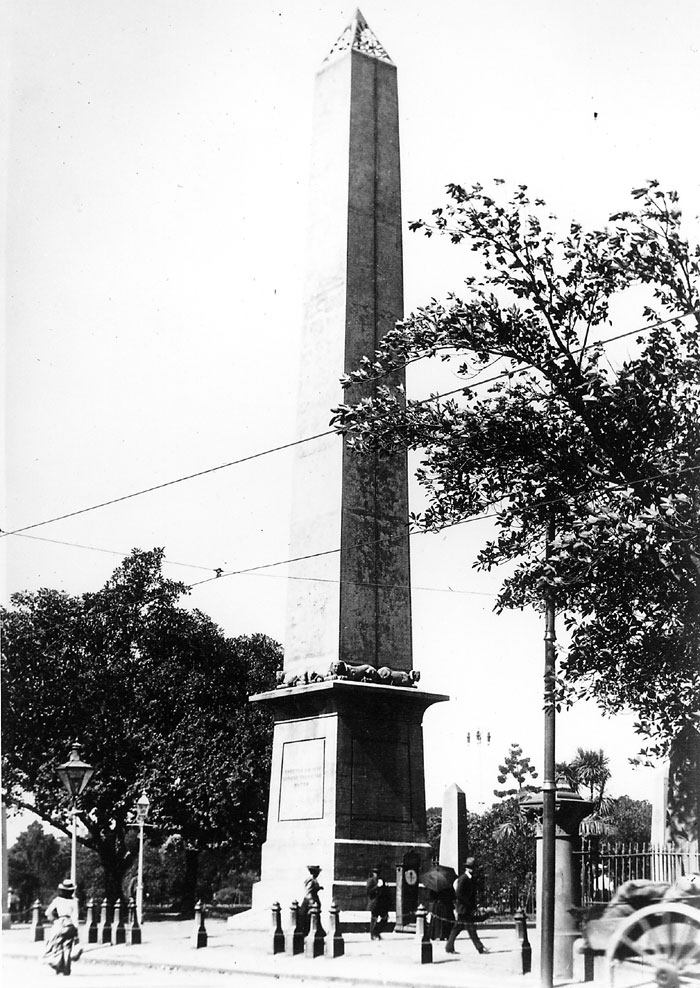
The Obelisk (early 1900s)

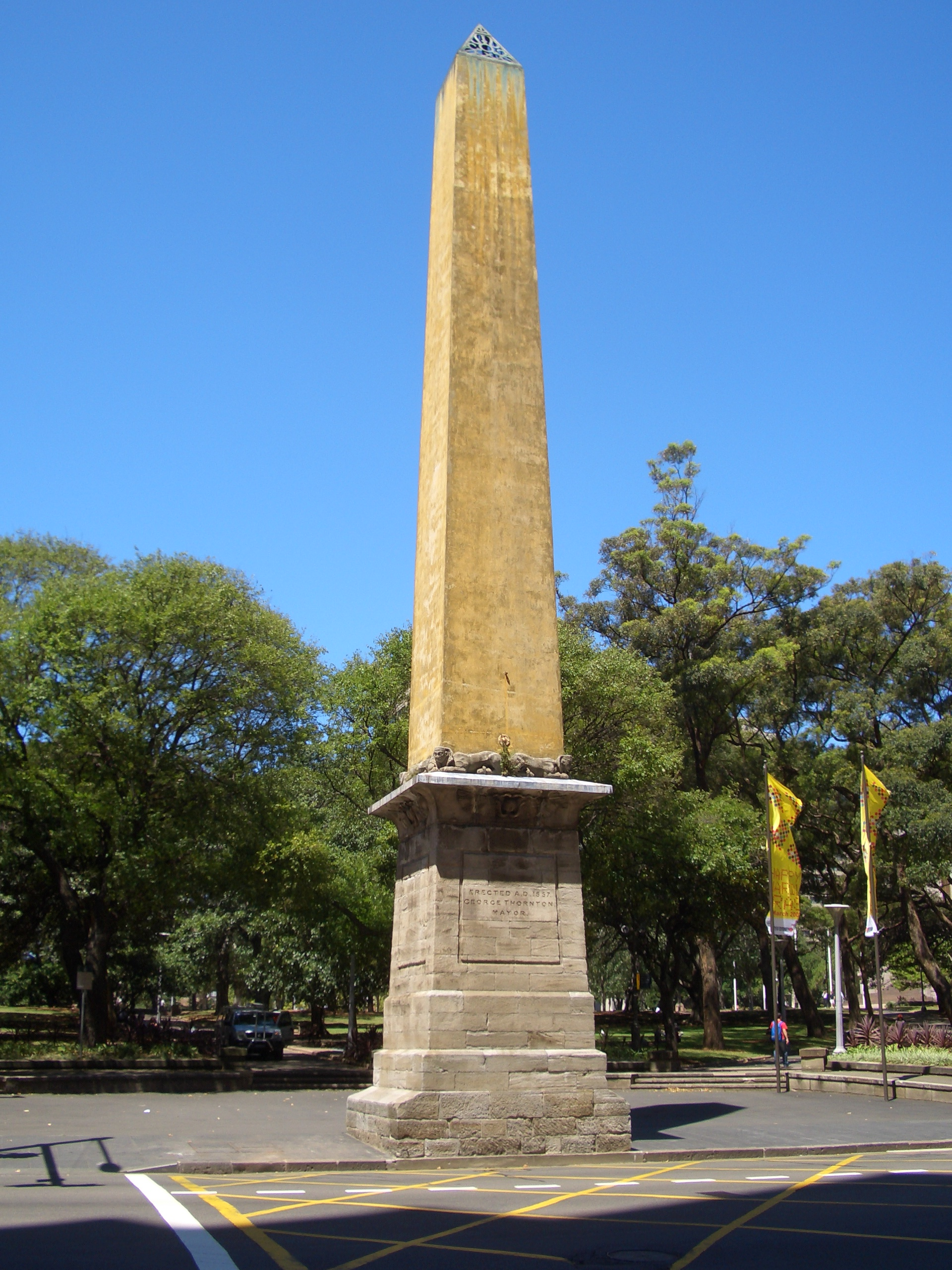
The Obelisk
(2007)

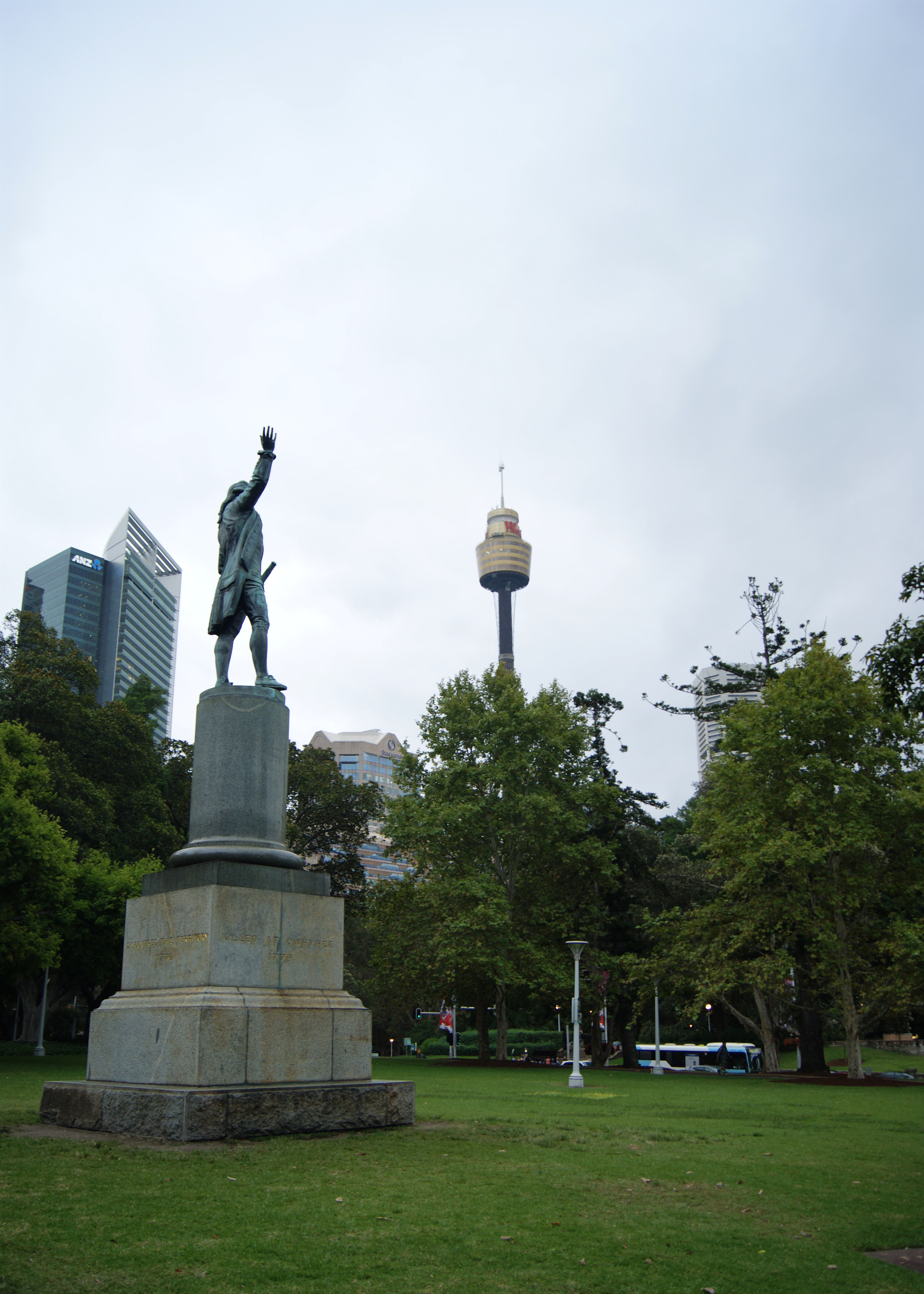
Captain Cook statue by Thomas Woolner

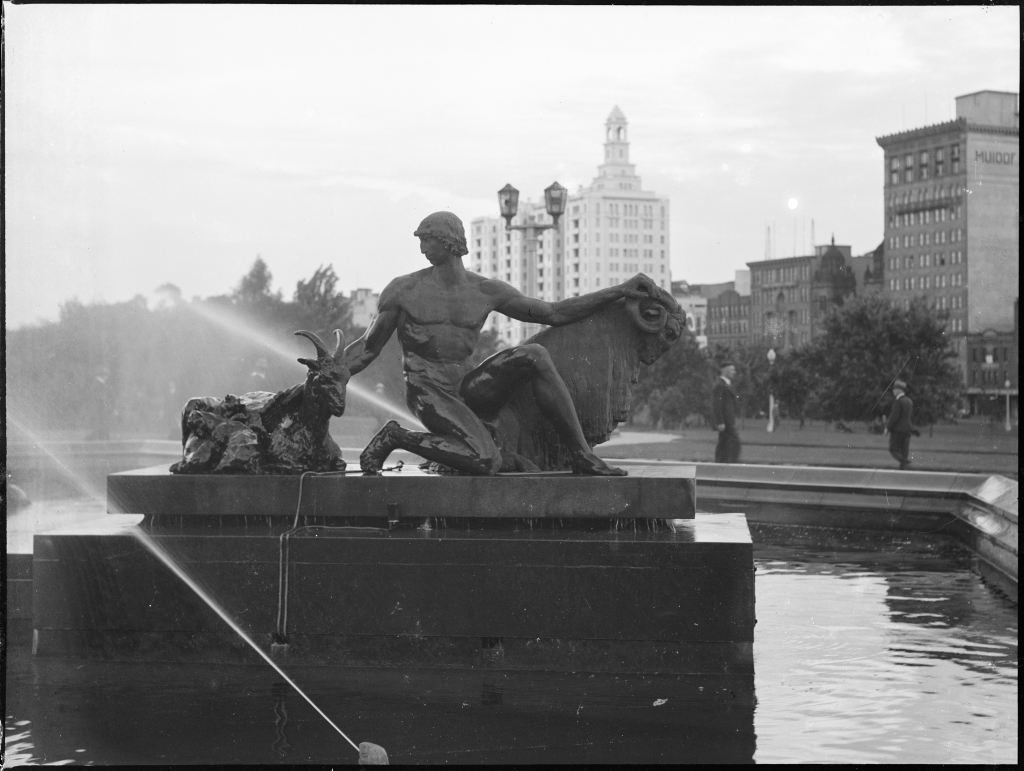
The Archibald Fountain (1932)

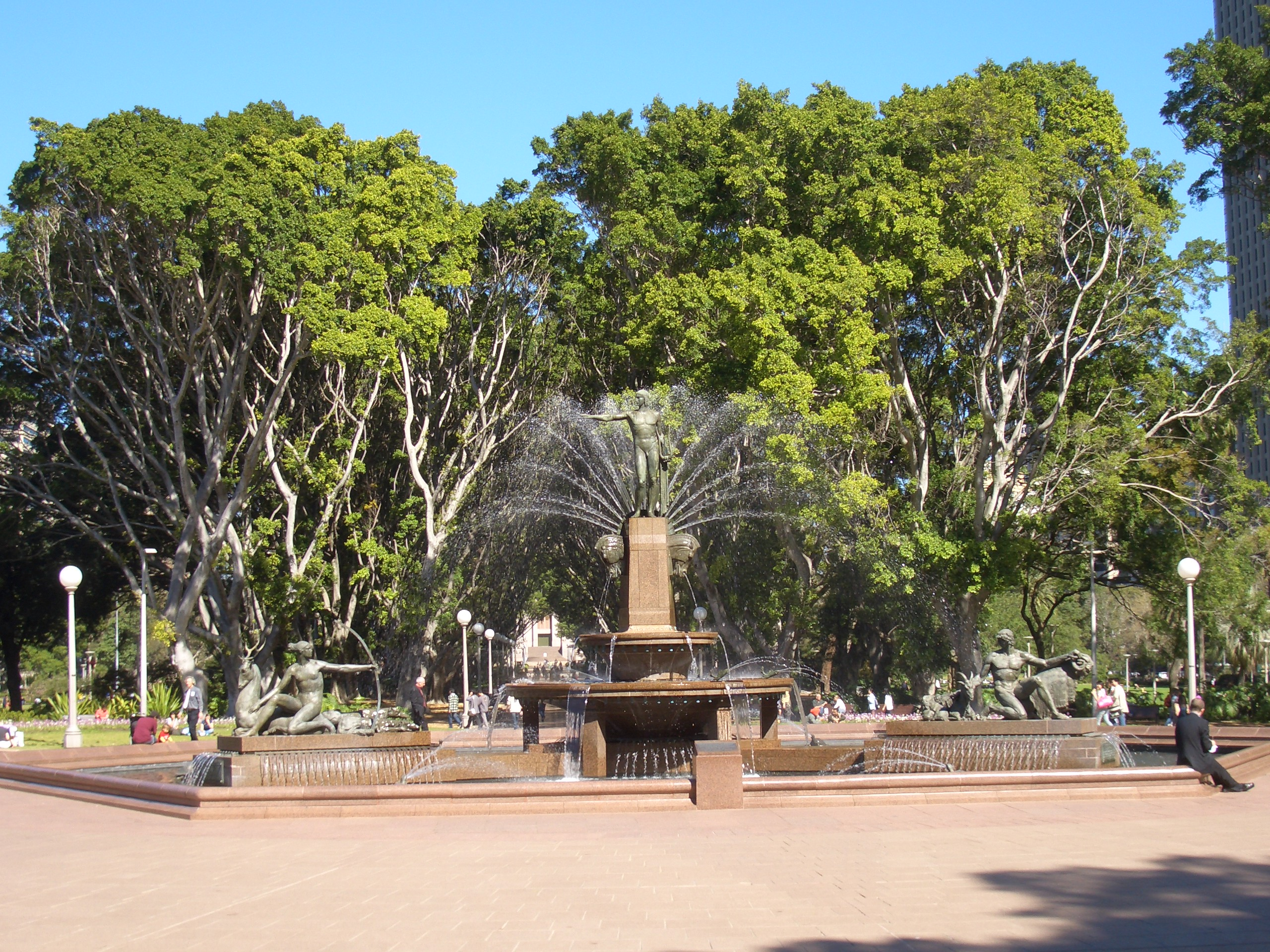
Archibald Fountain (2006)

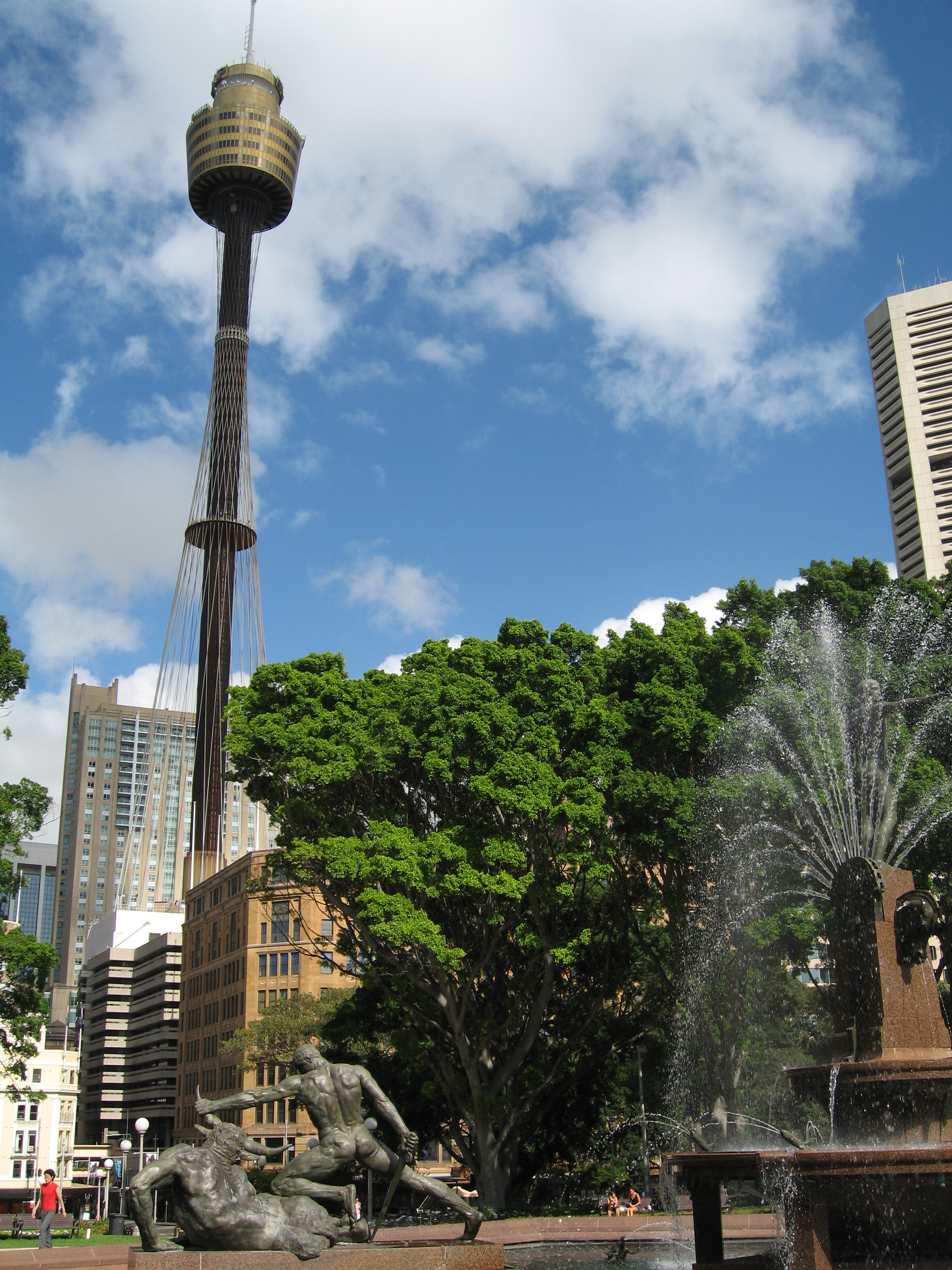
Archibald Fountain (2012)

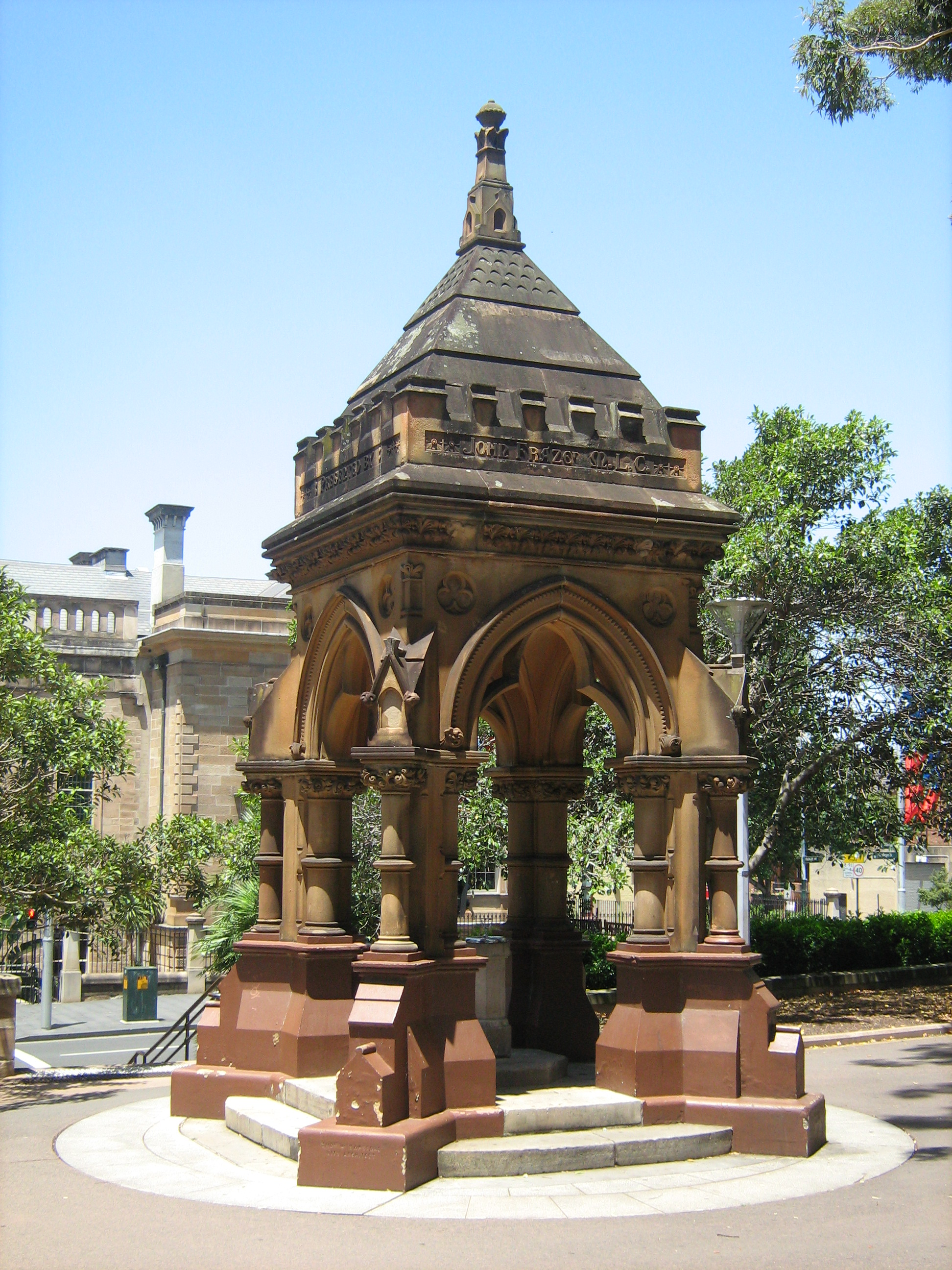
Water fountain

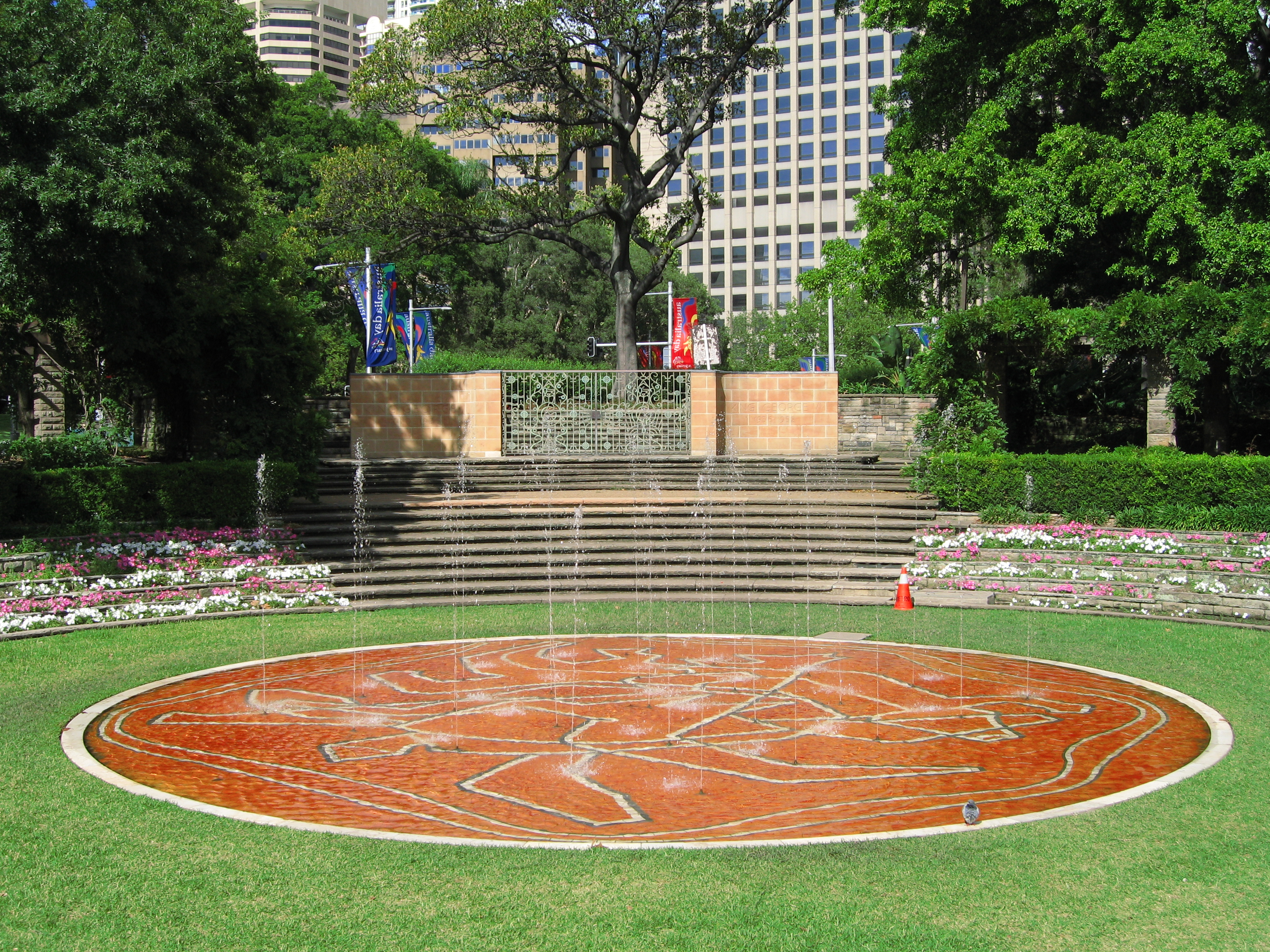
Sandringham Gardens

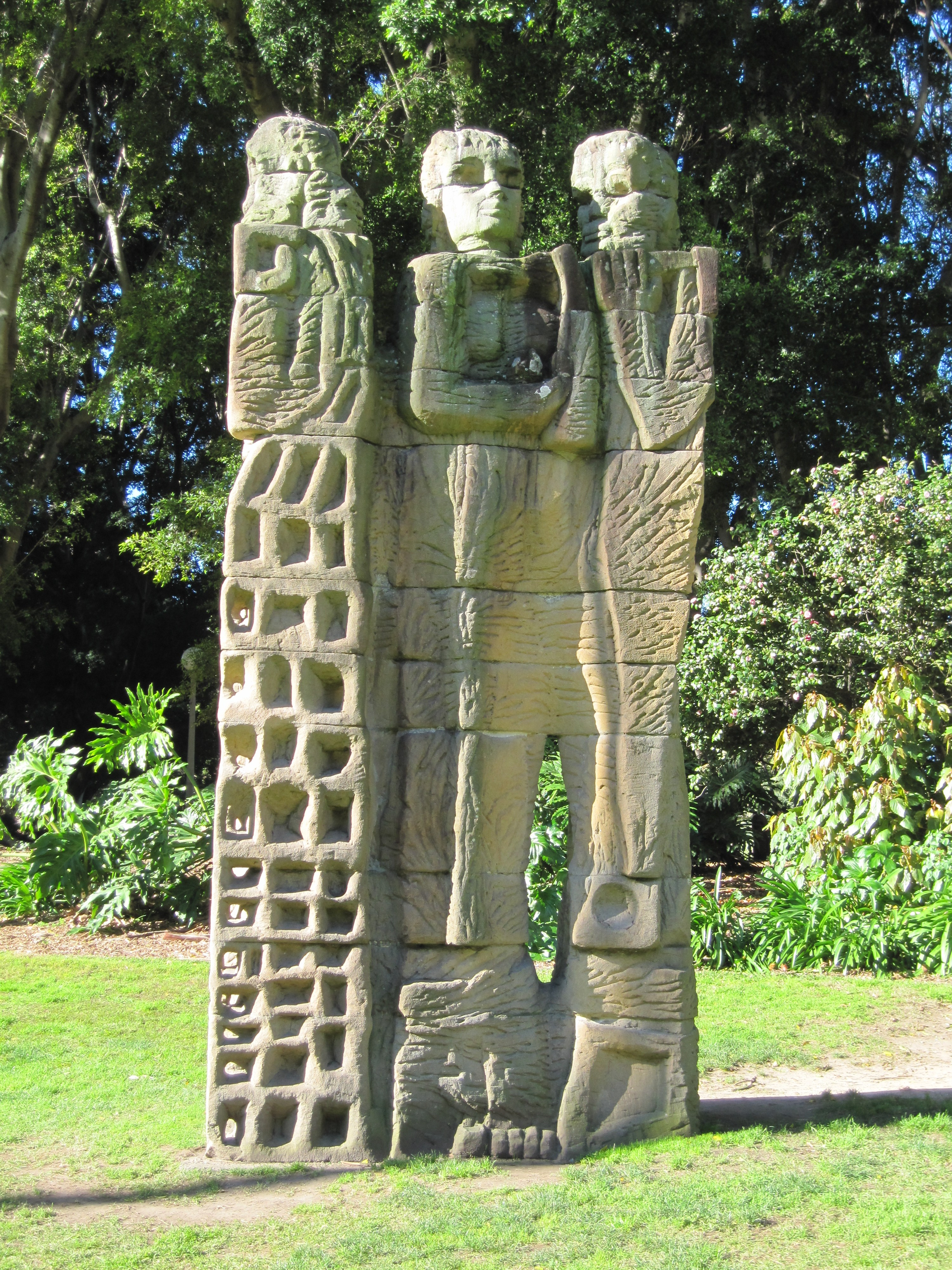
Water, Fire and Earth sculpture at the northern end of Hyde Park. Gerard Havekes 1961

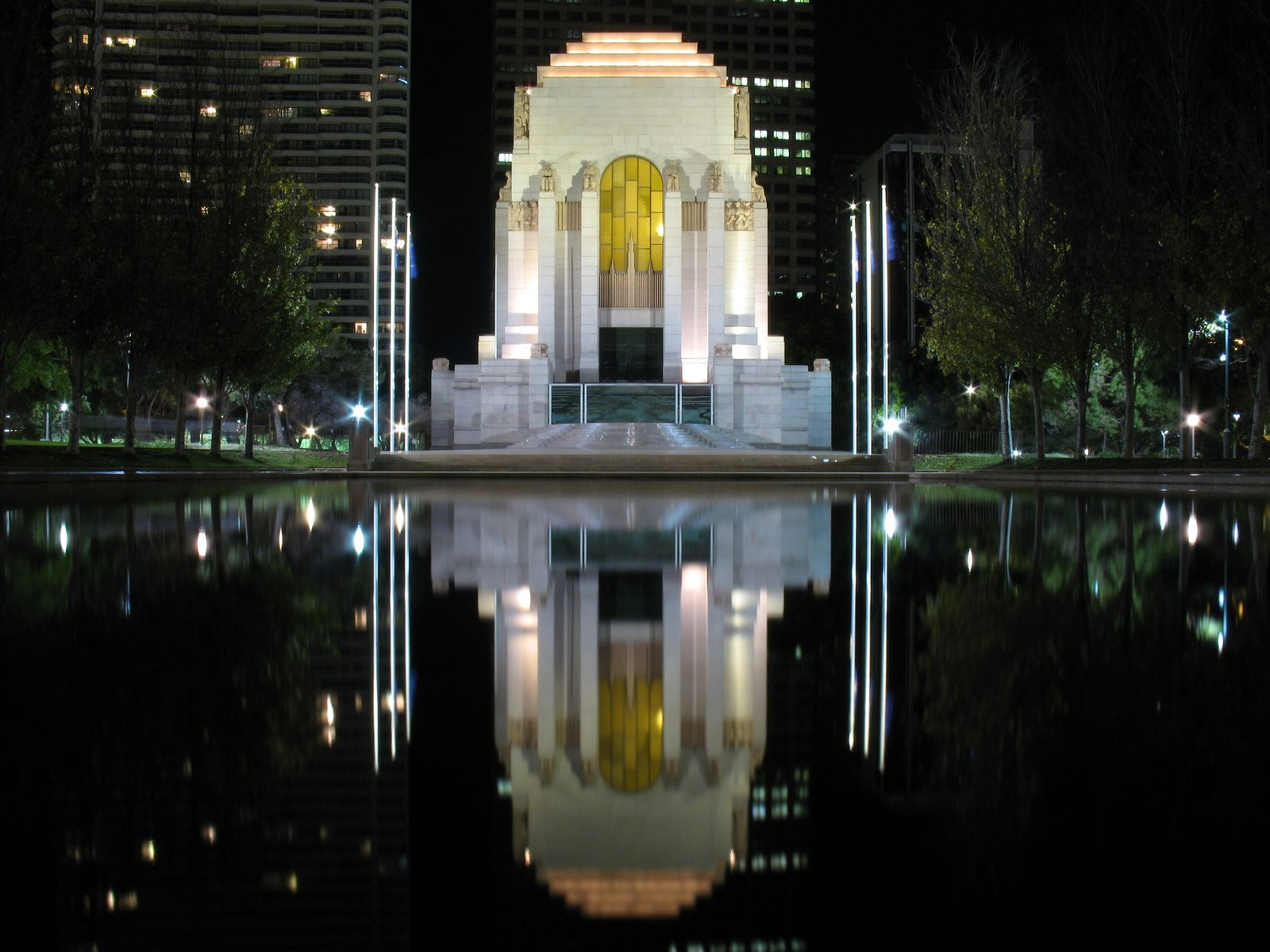
ANZAC War Memorial at night (2007)

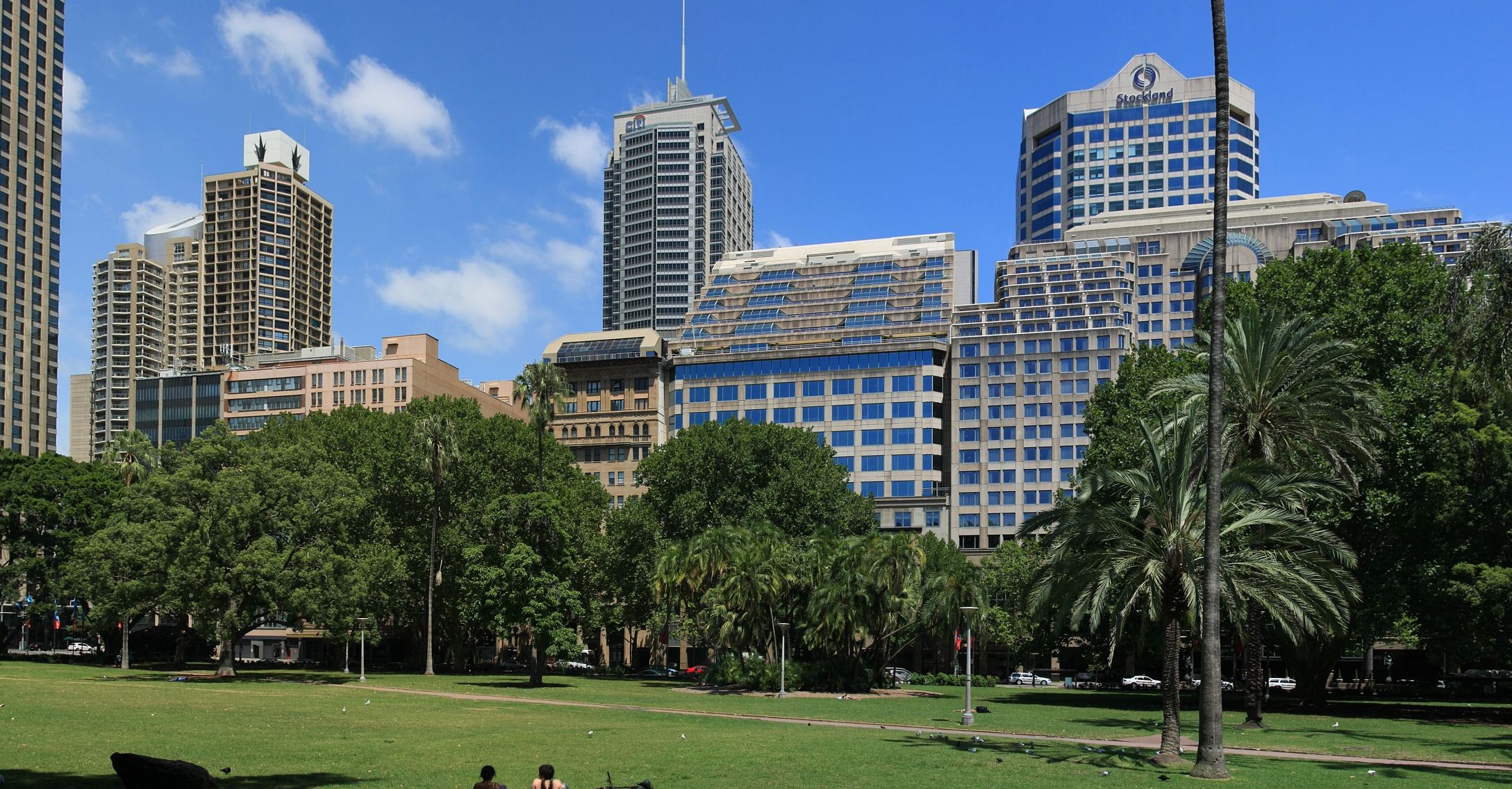
Looking toward Elizabeth Street (2009)

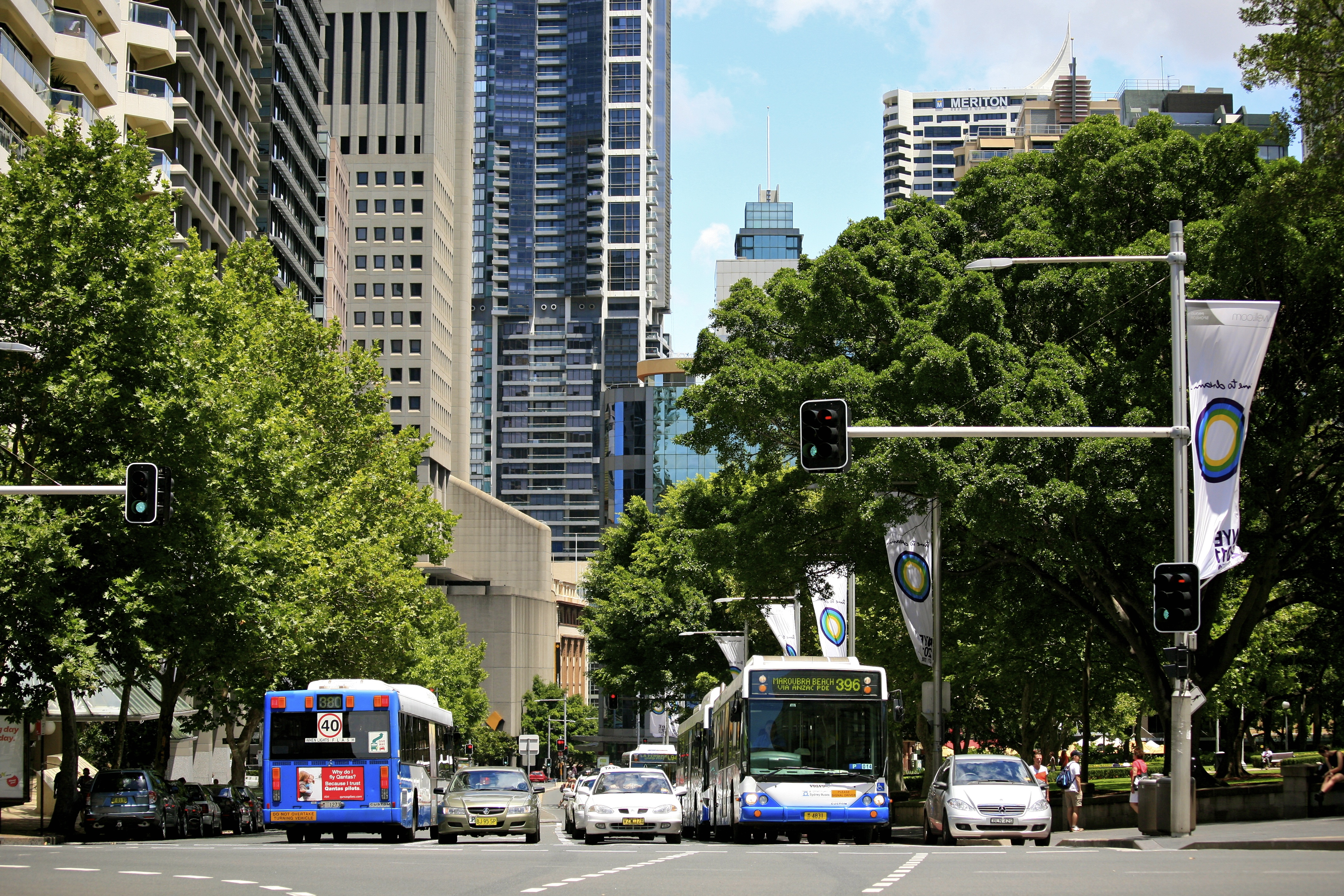
Looking from Oxford Street toward Hyde Park (2013)

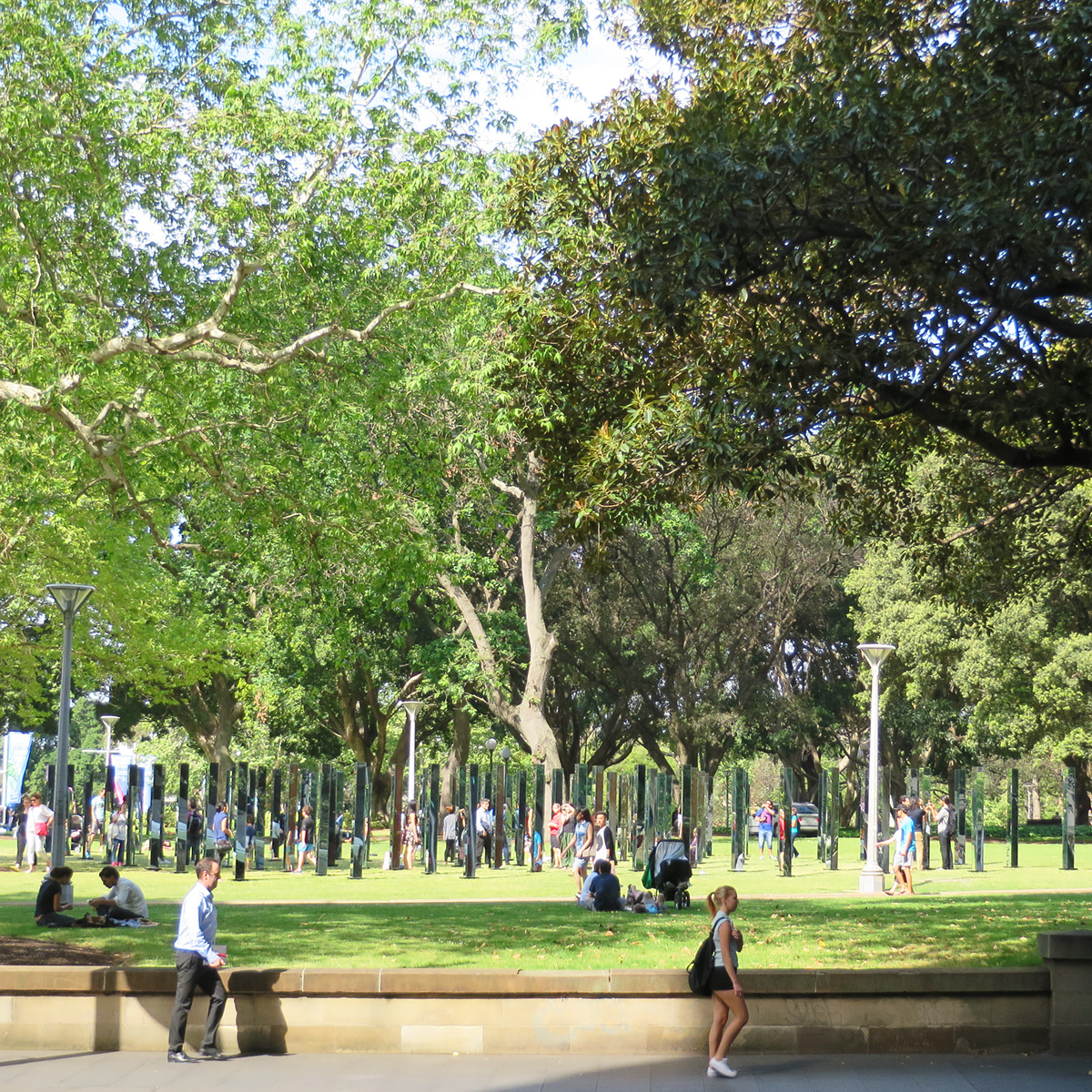
A mirror art installation in the southern end of Hyde Park (2013)

== See also ==
- HMAS Sydney I – SMS Emden Memorial
- Parks in Sydney
- Hyde Park, London
