= 107–109 Bathurst Street, Sydney =

Heritage-listed building in Sydney, Australia

107–109 Bathurst Street
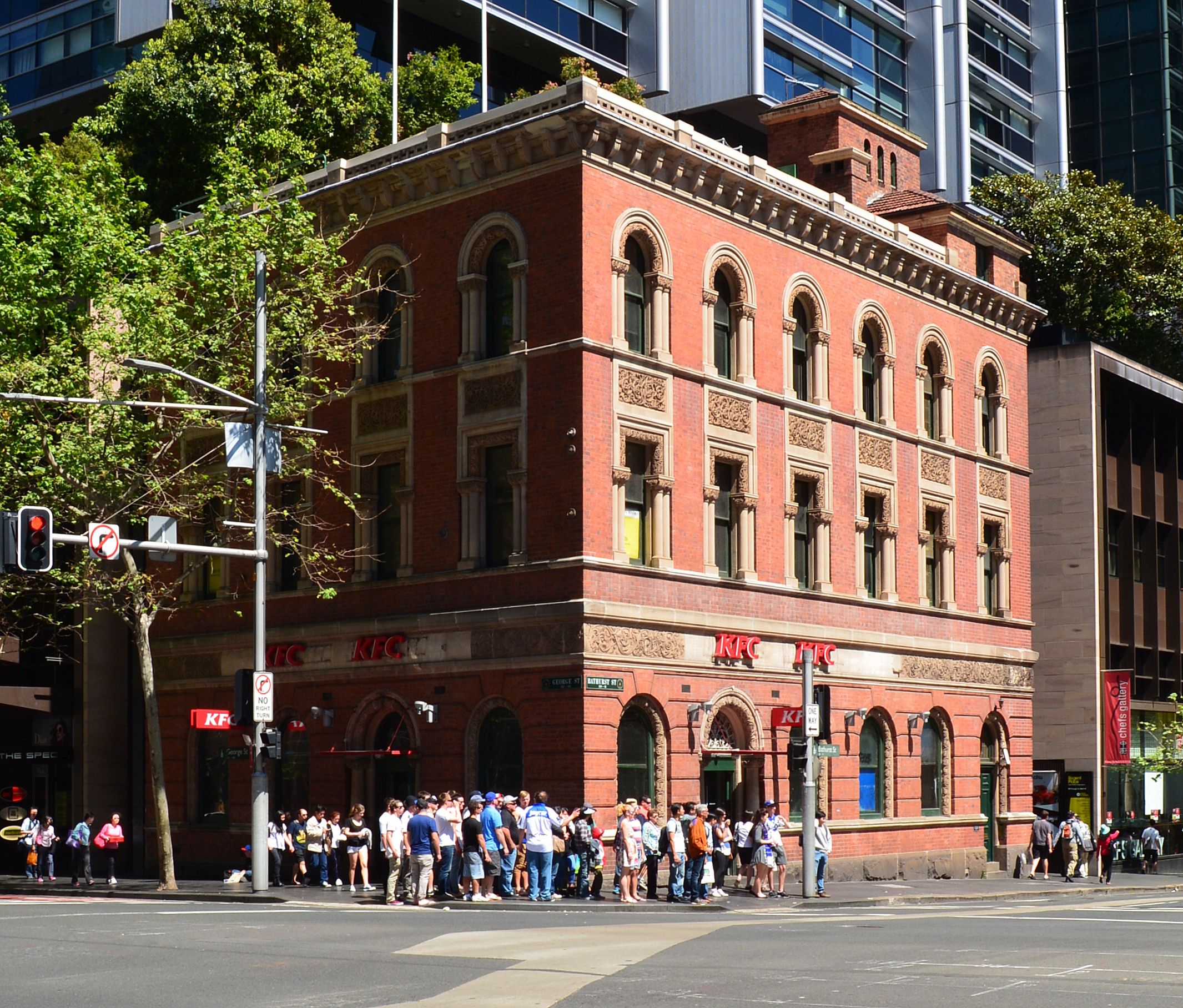
- Former bank building, now KFC fast food restaurant

- Location within Sydney Location within Australia
- 33.8746°S 151.2063°E
- Location: 107–109 Bathurst Street, Sydney, New South Wales, Australia

History
- Built: 1894–1895
- Built for: Bank of New South Wales

Site notes
- Architect: Varney Parkes
- Architectural style: Romanesque Revival

New South Wales Heritage Register
- Official name: Bank of NSW
- Type: State heritage (built)
- Designated: 2 April 1999
- Reference no.: 80
- Type: Bank
- Category: Commercial
- Builders: J. A. Eaton

107–109 Bathurst Street, Sydney is a heritage-listed former bank building and now KFC fast food restaurant located at 107–109 Bathurst Street, Sydney, New South Wales, Australia. The property is privately owned. It was added to the New South Wales State Heritage Register on 2 April 1999.

== History ==
The following historical outline provides and analysis of the development of the site on the corner of George and Bathurst Streets, Sydney (485 George and 107–109 Bathurst Streets). The thematic framework of this development relates to its associations with the growth of Sydney to an international commercial and banking centre, the context of its location in Sydney's civic precinct, and more recent associations with the cinema entertainment strip in George Street. An analysis of the development of the fabric of the former bank building is provided to assist the historical understanding of the place.

The historical outline relies on research at Westpac Historical Services, the Land Titles Office, the Mitchell Librarian, the University of New South Wales architecture Library, a 1989 Conservation Management Plan, and a 1996 archaeological report.

=== Aboriginal communities of Sydney ===
The name "Eora people" was given to the coastal Indigenous community around Sydney, and the central Sydney area is now referred to as "Eora Country". The traditional owners of the Sydney City area are the Cadigal band. Their land south of Port Jackson stretches from South Head to Petersham. Following the 1788 European occupation of Sydney, the Cadigal were alienated from their lands, and many died in smallpox epidemics in the early years of European settlement. However, descendants of the Cadigal continue to live in Sydney.

There appears to be no pictorial or written records of the Cadigal in the vicinity of the site, and it is unclear whether any archaeological evidence of pre-contact occupation remains either under the road system or in the Sydney Square precinct. The adjoining building allotments have been excavated to bedrock, as has much of the city block. However, the 1996 Higginbotham report does identify potential archaeological localities nearby on Kent Street. There are no known land claims over the site.

=== Overview of the development of Sydney and the site, 1788 to the 1980s ===
Early buildings site immediately to the south of the Sydney's Old Burial Ground, were remote from the early settlement at Sydney Cove, when Governor Bligh assumed control of the colony in 1806, only five sites were leased south of the Burial Ground. In addition to this there were several unauthorized cottages along George Street in this area. During the 1820s the town of Sydney extended southwards, with commercial activities along the shores of Darling Harbour. Bathurst Street became an access route to this area from the wharves. The St Andrew's Cathedral site was consolidated by closing York Street at Druitt Street. Kent Street was extended to Liverpool Street, forming the current city block bounded by George, Bathurst, Kent and Liverpool Streets. By the 1830s evidence of permanent settlement on allotments in the area extended along George Street to Broadway, and on Bathurst Street from Darling Harbour to the Hyde Park area. Construction of the St Andrew's Cathedral building on the opposite corner of George and Bathurst Streets recommenced in 1837, and street frontages were developed with a mix of residential, retail, commercial and entertainment uses.

The building booms of the 1860s, 1870s and 1880s in Sydney followed the discovery of gold, the expansion of rural export industries, advancements in industrial and communications technology, and continuing immigration into Sydney. Sydney's CBD and suburbs rebuilt and expanded, and by the 1890s rural recession, commercial expansion of the CBD had displaced most other activities. The economic recovery of the late 1890s saw a further expansion of commercial activities in the CBD until World War I from 1914 to 1918. The 1901 to 1920s saw another boom in activity, to become the Great Depression of the 1930s and the Second World War in the 1940s. It was not until the economic recovery of the 1950s that global trade recovered and another wave of industrialization occurred to fuel the long economic boom from the mid-1950s to the late 1970s.

Relaxed investment controls fuelled the corporate rebuilding of the Sydney CBD in the 1960s to 1970s, transforming Sydney into a major financial centre where technology-led business practices reduced the need for face-to-face transactions. A 1970s Bank of New South Wales expansion program saw new head office and chief offices in all States. The introduction of electronic banking in the early 1980s and the rapid transformation of the banking and finance sectors saw the amalgamation of the Bank of NSW and the Commercial Bank of Australia in 1982 to form Westpac.

==== The development of the city block and Sydney Square precinct ====
The Sydney Square precinct comprising the Sydney Town Hall and St Andrew's Cathedral, occupies the land bounded by George, Druitt, Kent and Bathurst Streets. The civic precinct was located on the highest point of George Street at the southern end of Sydney Town, with the first foundation stone of St Andrew's Anglican Cathedral laid in 1819, and the establishment of an adjoining cemetery at the same time, to be known later as the Old Burial Ground. During Governor Macquarie's administration, the official plan of 1822 indicates that the town block immediately south of the St Andrew's Cathedral site had been divided into allotments and some dwellings had been built along George and Liverpool Streets. Kent Street came to an end at the Bathurst Street southwards is reflected in a shift in the north–south town grid at this point. By the time St Andrew's Cathedral was completed and consecrated in 1868, the Old Burial Ground had been acquired by government for the permanent site of the Sydney Town Hall. The Town Hall was erected in the 1870s and the completion of both buildings established the civic core of the Sydney Square precinct.

The boom periods of the 1850s–1860s and the 1970s-1880s saw the infilling of all street frontages in the area with retail and commercial buildings, services infrastructure including water and sewerage and gas, and paving to roads and footpaths. The form of Sydney's civic precinct did not significantly alter after this period, but the city block bounded by George St, Bathurst St, Kent St and Liverpool St saw continual alteration as the commercial importance of this area grew and allotments were redeveloped from the 1870s.

With the completion of the new bank building in 1895, Sydney Square was now complete with fine civic buildings: at its southern edge of the square by the Bank of NSW building, and at the northern end by the 1894-1897 stylistically similar but much larger Romanesque Revival-styled Queen Victoria Markets building. The significance of this setting is recognised by its listing in the (now defunct) Register of the National Estate as a whole precinct group of buildings.

Amalgamation of internal sites of the city block in the 1920s following the closure of the timberyard of Goodlet & Smith, saw the construction of the Regent Theatre adjoining the former Bank building, and the Trocadero Hall with frontages to George Street. However, the onset of the 1930s Depression and World War II meant that little physical change occurred until the 1950s.

===== Summary of site chronology =====
The following timeline gives an overview of the site chronology:

- 1807 – Plan of the Town of Sydney in NSW. Most land north of the Old Burial Ground had been leased, but only five leases exist to the south. George Street extends to Broadway, but Bathurst Street had not been formed.
- 1822 – Plan of the Town and Suburbs of Sydney. During Governor Macquarie's time, Bathurst Street extends from Kent Street to Pitt Street. The block formed by Bathurst, Kent, Liverpool and George Streets has been subdivided into allotments. Several buildings are located along the western alignment of George Street.
- 1820s – Kent Street is extended to Liverpool Street to form the city block formed by Bathurst, Kent, Liverpool and George Streets.
- 1823 – A 10 1/4 perch (250 square metres (2,700 sq ft)) allotment on the corner of George and Bathurst Streets is leased to Mary Claver.
- 1831 – Map of the Town of Sydney. The land is granted to Mary Cleever by Governor Darling. Some detached cottages are indicated further along George and Bathurst Streets as Sydney spread southwards.
- 1844 – Mary Cleever sold the property to Anne Norton and Peter Coyle.
- 1853 – The land is transferred to James and David Dickson.
- 1861 – The Kangaroo Hotel operates as a two-storey building on the George and Bathurst Streets corner, in a row of two storey terraces on George Street. A rear lane from Bathurst Street provides rear access.
- 1870s – The properties were leased to Alexander Yeend in 1971 and John Bowen in 1873, and continues to operate as the Kangaroo Hotel.
- 1877 – The Kangaroo Hotel and two adjoining properties on George Street (previously 481-485 George St) were purchased by the Bank of NSW.
- 1883-1884 – The three properties are extended an additional floor, forming a three-storey bank building on the corner of Bathurst and George Street, and adjoining retail premises, in Victorian Regency style. The two upper floors of the bank premises provide accommodation for the resident manager. The bank retains a rear courtyard and attached outbuildings. Architects Backhouse and Lough.
- 1894–1895 – The 1884 development is demolished and rebuilt in Commercial Romanesque Revival style to form a larger three-storey bank premises with basement. The building now extends in part to the rear lane off Bathurst Street. Architect Varney Parkes of Parkes & Alderson.

=== Early occupation of the site, 1820–1877 ===
The two-hundred-and-fifty-nine-square-metre (two-thousand-seven-hundred-and-ninety-square-foot) site on the corner of George and Bathurst Streets was leased in 1823 to Mary Cleever, who subsequently purchased the land in 1831. The property was sold in 1844 to Ann Norton and Peter Coyle, and again in 1855 to James and David Dickson. The Kangaroo Hotel was established around 1860 on the corner site and operated by Elizabeth Love until 1863. The Sands Directory identifies the corner address as 471 George Street until a renumbering in 1880. In 1864 James Collins was identified as the hotel's operator, transferring the licence to Charles Reynolds from 1865 to 1867. In 1868 Alexander Yeend took over operations as publican until sale of the property to the Bank of NSW in 1877.

Although earlier plans show smaller detached buildings on the George/Bathurst Streets corner site and along George Street, the 1865 Trigonometrical Survey of the City of Sydney clearly indicates a row of 6 two-storey shops with rear outbuildings extending along George Street from the corner, and with right-of-way access from Bathurst Street. The right-of-way also provided access to properties at 103 and 107 Bathurst Street and to the Metropolitan Fire Brigade building at 105 Bathurst Street.

=== Early development of the site by the Bank of NSW, prior to the existing building, 1877–1894 ===
In 1877, the Bank of NSW purchased 485 and 487 George Street from David Dickson for £7,000 and operated from the two-storey building a year later. William C. Hill was the first resident Manager of the Bank of NSW Bathurst Street branch, from 1878 until 1887. The Bank's strategic acquisition of the Kangaroo Hotel on the south-west corner of George and Bathurst Streets in 1877, was a response to the increasing trading and commercial activities in the mid-city, a claim to civic prominence, and a demonstration of the role that banks played as a cornerstone of Victorian society. In 1883-4 the whole building was extended and re-clad to a design by architects Backhouse and Lough. In 1887 R. N. Sheridan took over as resident Manager until 1919. The original bank building was demolished in 1894 to provide for larger premises over both lots.

=== Development of the site by the Bank of NSW, 1895–1980 ===
The current building was constructed in 1894–1895 for the Bank of NSW to the design by Varney Parkes of Parkes and Alderson, architects. The design was a strongly-modelled three-storey building with basement in the "commercial Romanesque Revival" style popularized by the influential American architect HH Richardson. The contract was won by building J. A. Eaton on 7 August 1894 and built at a cost of £8,150. In 1910 the bank building was extended along Bathurst Street from five to six bays, updating and expanding staff and residential accommodation and public areas. The Bank's architects, Robertson & Marks, reproduced the 1895 building style to seamlessly incorporate the new extension into the old building. Comparison of the basement plans of the 1895 layout with the 1883 building plans suggests that the entire pre-1878 basement was demolished and further excavated to provide additional headroom and basement strong-rooms. It is probable that the perimeter basement walls to Bathurst and George Streets were rebuilt, as the location of basement airways to the footpath (since sealed), correspond to the window bays of the 1895 building over. The centre of the 1895 basement was the masonry strong-room with 750-millimetre (30 in) thick walls, directly accessing the ground floor banking chamber via iron spiral stairs behind the counter. The basement area was the central secure location of the Bank's strong-rooms, where gold, currency and valuable items were stored. The strong-room walls were 600-millimetre (24 in) thick masonry, supporting the internal structural columns of the buildings. A separate dogleg stairwell to the south led to the rear of the ground floor banking chamber and allowed access to the basement stores. The stores area was secured by a large iron gate and grille. Basement urinals were located at the southern stair for staff use. Under the Bathurst Street entrance a stair led down to another storage room.

The original basement has seen continuous modifications since 1910, reflecting alterations to the ground floor access, and bank security requirements. Since then there have been a series of internal changes, with major changes in 1935 and 1952–64. These changes were required to meet the bank's changing requirements such as; increased banking business, changes in banking functions and technology, as well as improvements to staff amenities and access.

1910 Basement alterations

The basement strong-room was left unchanged but the two stairs from the banking chamber were removed and replaced by a single two-flight stair on the southern wall. The addition of new extensions to the rear of the building saw the Bathurst Street entrance relocated. and the demolition of the 1895 staircase to a second basement store.

1931 Basement alterations

The construction of the city railway tunnel under the George Street facade of the building in the late 1920s saw a new basement wall built in 1931 to stabilise the building. A 230-millimetre (9.1 in) brick wall was constructed in the basement parallel with the rail tunnel to support the ground floor above. The Metropolitan Rail Corporation erected the wall.

1935 Basement alterations

In 1935 internal alterations including a lift, changes in stair access, rooftop accommodation and air conditioning were carried out, sympathetically designed by Peddle Thorpe & Walker architects. A statement by the Bank Building Inspector reflecting the Bank's accommodation requirements, record "the premises are undergoing extensive repairs ... and there will be no excuse for the staff not getting through their work in a reasonable time". The two-flight 1910 stairs was widened and reversed in 1935 to extend to the first floor and a rear passage was created through the previous Incineration Chamber, and associated air vents connected to the centre of the basement. Another air vent was formed to ventilate a dead end to the basement area to the rear western lane. Additional security grilles were installed to control access through the basement area. The work included the installation of lift well under the rear entrance hall with a shaft to the roof level.

1952 Basement alterations

An electric bullion lift was installed to the basement on the south wall to replace a manual lift.

1981 Basement alterations

Major changes occurred in the basement to accommodate the needs of a restaurant including, food preparation and storage areas, staff toilets, new mechanical, hydraulic and electrical services and the demolition of walls to form new openings in the central strong rooms area. A new stair was built in the redundant 1891 stairwell to Bathurst Street to provide kitchen access and emergency egress to the street level and floors above. The 1910/1935 southern stair to the ground floor was removed and a new stair was inserted in the centre of the basement through the strong-room, linking the basement kitchen to the ground floor/mezzanine/first floor dining areas. The 1931 structural masonry wall was demolished in 1981 to improve space usage, presumably after advice from a structural engineer. Health regulations required the installation of false ceilings to the basement area, concealing service pipes and ventilation ducts, and tiling of floor areas with waste outlets to allow cleaning. All masonry wall surfaces were rendered and painted, and fluorescent light fittings were fitted.

1991 Basement alterations

The basement level was replanned with a new layout to suit the needs of the KFC business. These include new partition layouts, new staff ablution areas, new coolrooms, services and lighting. The major basement change was the relocation of the food preparation areas to the ground floor to meet the KFC fast food model, and replacement with food storage areas. The 1981 stairs to the ground floor have been infilled with particleboard flooring.

Other developments and alterations

The first floor was altered from residential to office use over time to cope with the expanding bank business, so that by the early 1960s the Branch Manager had moved out, and upper floors were devoted to branch use. However, by the early 1970s a decline in Branch activities saw upper floors leased for short-term commercial and institutional use by Church-related organisations, until the property was sold in 1980.

As part of the frenetic redevelopment of the city in the late 1960s and 1970s, a development consent was obtained for a 12-storey commercial building on the former Bank site in 1969 as part of an intended sale of the site, and in the same year a 44-storey development was proposed for the adjoining Regent Theatre site isolating the bank building on the corner.

In 1978 the Bank building was listed on the (now defunct) Register of the National Estate, and a Permanent Conservation Order was placed on the building in 1981. The building continued to provide customer services, but its listing saw reduced bank use, as automatic teller machines could now not be incorporated into building facades, and the introduction of electronic banking reduced clerical positions.

The Bank of NSW scaled down services in the branch during the 1970s. It was clear that the Bathurst Street branch would be closed and disposed of during the rationalization of Bank assets in preparation for global electronic competition, and bank expansion by amalgamation. The Bank of NSW's 104-year holding was to cease with the 1980 sale to Tileska Pty Ltd, two years earlier than the 1982 Bank's amalgamation with the Commercial Bank of Australia Ltd to form Westpac.

Original 1895 ground floor

The original ground floor layout formed a 8.5-metre (28 ft) deep banking chamber along George Street. Recessed panelled entrance lobbies from George and Bathurst Streets incorporated swing doors into the public area. The L-shaped counter formed a public space some 2.5 metres (8 ft 2 in) deep along George Street with a splayed corner of the counter to a short return along Bathurst Street. Three cast iron columns in the banking chamber supported steel ceiling beams and the masonry walls of floors above. At the rear of the 1895 banking chamber, 450-millimetre (18 in) thick masonry walls enclosed the two stairs to the basement and separated the utility spaces behind. The central spiral stair directly connected to the basement strongroom, and the other stair to the main basement store.

Behind the bank proper, the private Bathurst Street entrance connected the ground floor manager's Office and the first and second floors. The rear quarters included a ground floor kitchen, washhouse, lavatory and rear yard. Banks were staffed by males at this time, as no female toilet facilities are evident in plans. A small kitchen food hoist is shown connecting the ground floor kitchen with upper floor accommodation, and Tobin ventilators are shown in a measured plan that may have supplied air to the basement or banking chambers.

1910 ground floor alterations

The 1910 alterations saw the expansion of the ground floor banking chambers by some 95 square metres with demolition of 50% of the existing rear walls, the removal of the central stair to the basement strongroom, and the relocation of the kitchen, the separate Manager's office and internal stairs. The extension of the bank building allowed the private Bathurst Street entrance and the connecting stairwell to the upper floors to be relocated. An additional column and ceiling beams were added to the banking chamber to support upper floors and walls, and two existing iron columns were removed, replaced by deeper steel beams. The public space was expanded and counters were lengthened. To the rear of the banking chambers, the washhouse was converted to the men's lavatory and a women's lavatory was added to the rear western wall. Partitioned offices for the accountant and for securities were provided with access from the public area, as well as access to the Manager's office.

1935 ground floor alterations

Alterations carried out in 1935 on the ground floor saw the installation of a lift in the 1910 private Bathurst Street entrance stairwell to the floors above. The lift installation required the rebuilding of the staircase, and it appears that part of the 1910 staircase was reused to fit the new location. A new southern staff stair to the floor allowed use of the first floor for banking staff use. The removal of all staff facilities and non-banking areas from the ground floor level freed up space for additional offices and partitioning. The rear kitchen hearth and flue was converted to an incinerator flue form the basement. The ground floor public space was enlarged to accommodate more customers. and tellers on the enlarged main counter were provided with booths.

1952 ground floor alterations

By 1952 the Bank branch was expanding upwards with the Manager's office and waiting area relocated to the first floor. some 24 work spaces, the accountant and sub-accountant's offices, and five tellers booths, were now crowded together on the ground floor, with a public area. No structural changes were undertaken on the ground floor level other than that required for air-conditioning ductwork and services and revolving doors at the two bank chamber entrances replacing the earlier entrance lobbies and doors. The installation of an electric bullion lift from the basement to the ground and first floors reduced staff movement to the strong-rooms.

1962–1966 ground floor alterations

Alterations were made to the public area with an extended counter and open enquiry counter areas to meet changing consumer operations, the removal of the 1952 revolving doors at the bank entries and replacement by glazed hinged doors. Staff were relocated to upper floors following the departure of the resident Manager.

1981 ground floor alterations

The sale and conversion to a restaurant, "Pancakes at the Movies", saw a major change to ground floor functions and fabric. The major intervention was the removal of all non-structural bank fabric on the ground floor, and the installation of a steel-framed mezzanine and stair in the 5.5m high banking chamber space.

A new stair was installed from the basement to the ground floor level with access into the private Bathurst Street entrance. Another stair led from the Mezzanine to the first floor dining area. The mezzanine provided an extended landing with some seating.

1991 ground floor alterations

The transfer of the property to the KFC Group saw further changes to the ground floor as the spaces were adapted to meet the specialised KFC brief for fast food outlets. KFC installed a large kitchen on the ground floor with an exhaust duct system to the roof through the southern stairwell skylight area (demolished). The ground floor kitchen areas were remodelled with new equipment and services, a servery counter was installed and floors were ceramic-tiled throughout. The 1981 mezzanine and stair were demolished, and a new steel-framed mezzanine and stair from the public area was erected, leading to the first floor dining area. New false columns were installed to support the mezzanine structure, and floor cut-outs across external windows attempted to reduce the visual and fabric impacts of the mezzanine structure on the facade. Public areas extended from a triangular queuing space at the counter with perimeter seating, and the new steel stair to the new mezzanine. The servery counter set diagonally across the floor allows visual contact to the majority of ground floor windows, with a screen behind that conceals the kitchen areas. Both the screen and the mezzanine effectively closes off the generous banking chamber space. The mezzanine occupies some 30 per cent of the ground floor public area of the building, providing some seating and tables overlooking the ground floor area. The public access stair continues to the first floor eating spaces where additional seating and customer toilet areas are provided. The mezzanine has a low ceiling height and stainless steel handrails to the perimeter of the mezzanine dominate the space. The mezzanine and stairs are also ceramic-tiles.

The first floor uses have altered from residential to office uses during bank ownership, but as the first floor was not part of the public bank spaces, much of the internal wall fabric was retained. The majority of alterations involved new doors cut through existing walls, the installation of wet areas, and introduction of vertical communications such as new stairs and lifts.

After the bank's sale, the 1981 and 1991 conversions to public restaurant spaces saw additional penetrations to open up the first floor rooms and provide a stair link to the mezzanine.

=== Upper level floor changes ===
Original 1895 fabric

The 1895 layout provided a two-level department for the Bank Manager, with drawing, dining and sitting rooms on the first floor and bedrooms on the floor above. Servant quarters on the first floor overlooked the rear lane and rear yard. A small lightwell in the centre of the building provided ventilation and a little light to the water closets and pantry. A rear entrance stairwell leading to Bathurst Street connected all floors in the building.

1910 alterations

Alterations in 1910 provided additional spaces for the new rear entrance stairwell that linked to the original 1895 staircase, a larger lightwell and pantry and a new bathroom. The formal rooms overlooking George and Bathurst Streets remained unchanged as part of the Bank Manager's residence.

1935 alterations

Undated plans show the first floor adapted to banking accommodation c. 1920-1930, with staff facilities, and make and female ablution areas. The formal rooms along the George Street frontage are labelled as spare rooms. The first floor lightwell has been roofed and provided with a skylight, illuminating a stair gallery extending the southern ground floor stairs to the first floor for staff access. The internal pantry areas are shown converted to a ladies lavatory, ventilating though internal highlight windows over the skylight roof. Rear windows to the laneway are shown significantly enlarged, although there is no evidence that this work was carried out.

The 1935 drawings show the new lift and lift lobby, and alterations to the stairs to the first floor to connect with the older Hall 3 stairwell to the upper floors. The ablutions areas have been rearranged and the formal rooms fronting George and Bathurst Streets are identified as offices. Terracotta partitions were used on timber floors to alter part of the original Dining Room for the men's lavatory, and the remainder as the women's changeroom. The southern skylight is shown enlarged. The change of use of the previous Dining Room also saw the infilling of the fireplace to the southern wall.

1952, 1964 and 1966 alterations.

Few alterations to the fabric occurred on the first floor level, although the functions of rooms appear to have been changed. The Manager's and Sub-Manager's offices and the Securities and bills operations moved from the ground floor and the corridor outside the Manager's office was used for visitor seating. Notes indicate that fire upgrading was required with the installation of fire doors and the sealing of areas forming part of emergency egress.

In 1964 minor alterations accommodated a swap of the men's and women's toilet areas and relocation of a cleaners room. In 1966 further minor alterations were made including two further openings between rooms.

1981 alterations

The conversion to restaurant use saw existing openings on the first floor expanded to visually link the original formal rooms, and provide for additional restaurant seating. The first floor was linked to the mezzanine below by a new stair cut through the floor. The southern staff stair was demolished and flooring was introduced to form a new public female toilet area. The 1966 staff lunchroom on the western wall was converted to a public male toilet area, allowing the 1935 ablutions area to be demolished and the Dining Room space to be reinstated. Floors to the first floor have been ceramic tiled to provide easily maintained surfaces. Banquette seating, fixed tables and chairs are installed to these areas and stainless steel handrails are installed to the mezzanine staircase. Two original fireplaces to the formal rooms have been retained, however one of these fireplaces has been isolated by the staircase penetration and associated handrails that are located some 20 cm from the fireplace. A suspended plasterboard ceiling and bulkheads were introduced throughout the floor to conceal new air-conditioning ducts. lighting and other services. Sprinkles were introduced throughout. New openings were made good, rendered and painted.

1991 alterations

The KFC operator introduced a new staircase down from the first floor level in the north-eastern corner of the building. A large part of the original Drawing Room floor was removed and the openings between the formal rooms were further enlarged. The Drawing Room fireplace was left on the wall as the flooring around it was removed to allow for the new mezzanine stair. The suspended ceiling appears to have been replaced and false walls and heads over openings were introduced, probably following the upgrading of air-conditioning services. Cornice mouldings were used to simulate older ceiling details. For many years Bank policy required the Bank Manager to reside on the premises. From 1896 the upper two floors were used as residential accommodation for the Branch Manager and family for many years. The 1895 second floor accommodated the three bedrooms, bathroom and wc of the two-level Branch Manager's apartment, while the first floor provided the living areas.

Bank records of the second floor and roof space are not comprehensive, but from available information it appears that by 1935 staff growth at the Branch had displaced the Manager's living areas on the first floor to the second floor. Terracotta partitions subdivided larger room overlooking George Street into two bedrooms and changing social customs saw the original first floor drawing/sitting room reduced to a lounge room on the north-eastern corner room of the second floor.

There is some evidence that the first and second floors may have been occupied at different periods by commercial firms using the private Bathurst Street entrance, but the second floor would have had longer continuous use as a residence.

Plans indicate in 1952 and 1954 that proposed alterations to the second floor and roof areas for bank uses were being considered. Alterations on the roof level maids quarters were made to accommodate the Bank's Advertising Department and staff facilities.

Following sale of the building in 1978, the new owner leased the second floor and roof areas for continuing residential uses. Partitioning was installed to form smaller rooms on the second floor, and the roof accommodation was extended to form a glazed pavilion enclosing a spa, with stepped terrace levels on the roof to landscape the external area. Metal handrails were provided to increase parapet heights to accessible areas.

The Bathurst Street entry stairwell allowed access from the second floor to the flat paved roof above, providing outdoor space for the laundry, children and other family activities. Maids quarters were located on the roof during the 1935 alterations, and the roof terrace was divided by a low brick wall to separate the maids activities from the family area.

The roof areas were modified in 1981 and again in 1991 to provide air-conditioning plant and exhausts, and steel stair access to plant areas.

For many years Bank policy require the Bank Manager to reside on the premises. The 1895 second floor accommodated the three bedrooms, bathroom and wc of the two-level Branch Manager's apartment, while the first floor provided the living areas.

Bank records of the second floor and roof space are not comprehensive, but from available information it appears that by 1935 staff growth at the Branch had displaced the Manager's living areas on the first floor to the second floor. Terracotta partitions subdivided larger room overlooking George Street into two bedrooms and changing social customs saw the original first floor drawing/sitting room reduced to a lounge room on the north-eastern corner room of the second floor.

The Bathurst Street entry stairwell allowed access from the second floor to the flat paved roof above, providing outdoor space for the laundry, children and other family activities. Maids quarters were located on the roof during the 1935 alterations, and the roof terrace was divided by a low brick wall to separate the maids activities from the family area.

There is some evidence that the first and second floors may have been occupied at different periods by commercial firms using the private Bathurst Street entrance, but the second floor would have had longer continuous use as a residence.

Plans indicate in 1952 and 1954 that proposed alterations to the second floor and roof areas for bank uses were being considered. Alterations on the roof level maids quarters were made to accommodate the Bank's Advertising Department and staff facilities.

Following sale of the building in 1978, the new owner leased the second floor and roof areas for continuing residential uses. Partitioning was installed to form smaller rooms on the second floor, and the roof accommodation was extended to form a glazed pavilion enclosing a spa, with stepped terrace levels on the roof to landscape the external area. Metal handrails were provided to increase parapet heights to accessible areas.

Changes were made to the upper floor after 1978 to form smaller rooms and a pavilion built on the flat roof area as a spa facility and associated bathroom for an aerial view of the roof extensions, which can be distinguished by the steel roof sheeting. It appears that the upper floor and roof spaces may have been used as short term accommodation, with access by lift from the Bathurst Street entrance of the building.

The roof is generally accessible and has artificial turf laid on the membrane surface. The southern area of the building reveals earlier structures and a roof-light to a first floor stairwell, now removed. The southern and western facades are utilitarian, in rendered brickwork with inset steel-framed windows and service pipes and designed to abut adjoining buildings.

=== Development after the bank was sold and use as a restaurant, from 1980 ===
Following the sale of the property by the Bank of NSW, to Tileska Pty Ltd, in 1980, the lower levels of the building were adaptively reused for restaurant food uses. The change of use from bank to restaurant was approved by the Heritage Council of NSW in 1981. Pancakes Australia operated the restaurant as Pancakes at the Movies for seven years from mid-1981 to 1987. This use responded to the transformation of this strip of George Street as a movie precinct. The use of heritage buildings by the Pancakes organisation was an early example of late 20th century corporate image-making in Australia.

When the building was converted to a three level restaurant, in the early 1980s, a mezzanine level was introduced into the ground floor banking hall, as well as alterations to the basement, ground and first floor levels to provide food preparation, sales and storage areas, public and staff facilities, seating and services including air-conditioning, mechanical ventilation and sprinklers.

The second floor was retained for residential use, and the basement level was fitted out to service the restaurant above. Additional facilities were built on the roof including a spa, extra rooms and roof terrace landscaping. External alterations included the removal of the Bank of NSW signage and new signage for the restaurant, and awnings and modified entrance doors.

In 1987 the restaurant spaces in the building were leased to another operator, Cassidy's Restaurant, who continued to operate the premises as a restaurant for the next two years. By 1989 the premises had become vacant.

In 1989, a Conservation Plan was prepared for the new owner Tileska Pty Ltd who considered changes of use for the building to fund the maintenance of the heritage fabric and improve the economic viability of the building. The Plan was prepared to support an application for transfer of heritage floor space to the adjoining site, a commercial use on the top two floors, and more internal alterations to suite new lessees. In 1991 the lower floors were leased as a KFC fast food outlet. A new lease was signed which runs to 2008 with an option for another four years till 2012.

In the last twenty years there have been a number of internal changes to the building, including fire-stair amendments, as well as new bathrooms and kitchens throughout the building on different levels. The current use of the lower three levels of the building, since 1991 is as a KFC fast food restaurant. This saw the rebuilding of the mezzanine and stair access and further internal alterations to public areas.

In relation to recent surrounding development, the adjoining Regent Theatre site was excavated in 1997/1998 for a high-rise office tower, but the site has remained vacant until 2005. Excavations in sandstone some 10 metres dep on the property was taken to the external walls of the former Bank building. Fortunately, the structure of the bank building has remained undamaged during this time.

In December 2003, the City of Sydney Council approved a Stage 2 Development Application for the podium level of a pair of proposed high-rise residential towers, which is to include a 42-level and 30-level residential towers on a 3-storey commercial podium. In July 2005, this podium is almost complete up to the parapet level of the former Bank building. The podium will be on both sides of the former Bank building facing two streets and has been scaled to relate to the Bank building facades.

To conclude the second storey of the former Bank building is currently vacant, after being briefly occupied in 2004 as a site office for the proposed office tower development on the adjacent site. The roof level areas are also vacant, except for roof plant etc.

== Description ==
=== The urban context and curtilage ===
The building is located on the south-west corner of George and Bathurst Streets completing the southern edge of Sydney Square along Bathurst Street. The former Bank building is an important part of the George Street streetscape and Sydney Square. It is located on a prominent corner location, is of modest scale, with delicately-carved external stonework, and as a remnant of an earlier Sydney streetscape.

The existing former Bank building covers the whole of the small corner site, which is 259 square metres. It is adjacent to a building site that was a large hole and vacant for a number of years. Recently, the site has been developed as part of a podium for an approved high-rise residential development, and this will reinstate the former Bank building as part of an established streetscape.

The current use of the former Bank building as a KFC outlet reflects the current trend in the Central Business District to recycle former commercial buildings for hospitality uses. Other examples of this type of development are seen at the other end of the block on the corner of George and Liverpool Streets where the former ANZ Bank has been recycled as the Three Monkeys Hotel. The current KFC fast food restaurant attracts a wide cross-section of customers and supports the role of the George Street cinema strip between Bathurst and Liverpool Streets as an entertainment precinct.

Within the Bank building's extended setting and visual catchment, two specific zones have been defined and graded according to their heritage significance. The first setting of the Sydney Square precinct is widely recognised and identified in the Register of the National Estate. The second zone is that of the more transformation of the George Street cinema entertainment strip in the 1980s.

Setting 1 is noted in the building's Statement of Significance on the Register of the National Estate 1978 listing as follows:

Well-proportioned and sited corner bank building. Complements St. Andrew Cathedral precinct. Provides important visual stop to open vista from the Queen Victoria building looking south. Helps to grade the scale between the Cathedral and larger buildings further south. Part of Town Hall group.

Setting 1 is demarcated by the visual catchments of the eastern edge of the Sydney Square, the George Street vista southwards and the bulk of St Andrews Cathedral along the Bathurst Street edge.

Setting 2 of the building is the George Street cinema entertainment strip between Liverpool and Bathurst Streets, where the redevelopment of the Trocadero site and nearby lots in the 1980s saw the construction of three major cinema complexes, restaurant and food outlets and pinball parlours. The resultant 24 hour street activity throughout the week saw the new owners of the Bank building adaptively reuse the building in 1981 for restaurant use and later for a fast food outlet.

The former Bank acts as a transition from the formal, large scale, precinct of Town Hall Square with its large spaces and buildings to the more personal scale of the commercial streetscape along George Street and its entertainment strip.

In regard to future development for the building, as residential redevelopment in the George Street precinct proceeds there may be an opportunity to reinstate previous spaces and details that refer back to its original use as a commercial bank. However, due to the fact that the existing tenant currently has a lease for the next four years, with an option for another four any major changes to the building apart from maintenance are unlikely in the near future.

=== Stages of development ===
The following is a summary of alterations and additions undertaken to the 1895 Bank of NSW building, and as illustrated in the following plans. There is some uncertainty regarding dates of some early alteration work, as joinery elements may have been reused.

- 1894 – The architect Varney Parkes, of Parkes and Alderson, was commissioned by the Bank of NSW to rebuild the Bathurst Street branch to provide additional accommodation at a cost of 7,000 pounds.
- 1895 – The three-storey Commercial Romanesque Revival style building with basement was completed at a cost of 8,150 pounds. Construction was load-bearing brickwork, concrete ground floor slab and timber upper floors supported by internal cast iron columns. Externally the building featured sandstone window and door reveals, parapets, carved panels on ground floor stone entablature and trims with carved Romanesque style detailing around openings and as a frieze to the street frontages.
- 1910 – The building was extended to the western boundary for additional accommodation with altered access to basement and upper floors. The 1910 extensions by architects Robertson and Marks, are distinguished by careful matching of external form, materials and style, windows and doors, to the original building. Internal bank alterations improved the efficiency of the ground floor banking chamber, including the removal of internal walls and a new stair access to the basement vault.
- 1935 – Alterations by architects Peddle Thorpe & Walker further altered the internal layout to improve efficiencies and staff amenities, and air conditioning and additional rooftop accommodation were installed. A new lift installation was housed within a brick lift shaft that extended to a Romanesque styled lift motor room at roof level.
- 1952–1964 – An electric bullion lift was installed, and public areas and offices were altered to meet changing banking requirements.
- 1981 – Change from bank use to restaurant use saw alterations in the basement, ground floor and first floor, and the addition of a mezzanine and stair within the ground floor banking hall. Rooms on the roof were built to provide additional accommodation and facilities.
- 1987 – Minor alterations were made for new restaurant operators.
- 1990–1991 – A new fit-out of the lower floors of the building was carried out to meet the brief of the operator KFC. The fit-out involved a new mezzanine and staircase access, and alterations to the basement, ground and first floors.

=== Facades of the building ===
The latest major changes was in 1989, when the building was refurbished. The plans from this intervention are included in Section 2.9, which describes the changes and development of the "Internal Fabric" of the former Bank building.

=== External detailing and building fabric ===
The former Bank building is a three storied brick building with a basement and roof terrace area. It fronts onto two streets, Bathurst and George, and these facades have decorative stone work detailing. The former laneway on the west and the southern wall are built with common bricks and are basic secondary walls.

The external fabric of the street facades of the Bank of NSW building is little changed from the original 1895 and later 1910 additions. The city Council's 2000 Central Sydney Heritage Inventory Statement of Significance states:

General

The building should be retained intact in its present overall form. A conservation plan should be prepared to guide the future use and maintenance of the place.

Exterior

The George and Bathurst Street elevation and detail should be preserved without alteration. Later signage and small-scale intrusions to the original building fabric should be remedied. Ongoing conservation work should be carried out to the facade elements to ensure long-term life.

The exterior fabric of the building of load-bearing brickwork and partial stone cladding provides a vigorous interpretation of Romanesque Revival style with stone elements such as the plinth, table course at sill level, a delicately carved deep stone entablature supporting the upper two floors of stone and brickwork, carved stone window surrounds, stone panels and cornices. Distinctive arched windows and a rendered parapet complete the street facades. The ironwork over the main entrance doors appears in good condition.

The 1910 extension to the Bathurst Street facade adding an additional window bay matches the 1895 facade and brickwork, and is unobtrusively identified by a minimal vertical joint through brickwork. The roof has had a number of structures built since 1910 to provide servants accommodation, a lift motor room with lift overrun, a small flat, as well as a spa. Earlier structures sit behind the parapet and are sympathetically assembled to match the original 1894/1895 building in both materials and style. Smaller structures on the roof built in 1981 provide an enclosure for a spa and other facilities.

The current KFC restaurant owner has installed some relatively small and low-key neon signage on the first floor stone entablature, and fabric awnings over the George and Bathurst Street entrances.

The 1910 external panelled timber door to the lower Bathurst Street entrance, and all external windows to the street facades, have been retained in situ. However, both Bathurst and George Street customer entrances to KF public areas have been replaced with automatic sliding glass doors.

=== Basement ===
The original basement area was the central secure location of the former Bank's strong-rooms, where gold, currency and valuable items were stored. The strong-room walls were 600mm thick masonry, supporting the internal structural columns of the building. Since 1910, the basement has seen continuous modifications reflecting alterations to the ground floor access, and bank security requirements. Since 1981 the basement has been modified to provide staff facilities, food storage areas (including refrigerated storage), new services and new staff egress routes.

=== Ground floor/former banking chamber ===
The ground floor banking chamber area was the focus of the former Bank's activities, with public areas and teller's counters, and offices. The ground floor areas were where most of the alterations to the building fabric were made to meet changes in banking practices from the 1890s to the 1950s. Since 1981, when the building was recycled for restaurant use, most of the earlier evidence of the Bank use has been removed.

== Heritage listing ==
The former Bank of New South Wales Building, known as 485 George Street, Sydney, is a rare example of a late 19th century Romanesque style commercial bank building, with Manager's accommodation above. It is an important landmark building in the centre of Sydney's CBD and is an integral component of the late 19th century Town Hall precinct. The precinct includes; Sydney Town Hall, the Queen Victoria Building and St Andrew's Cathedral.

In the 1860s the site was occupied by the Kangaroo Hotel. In 1877, the site was purchased by the Bank of New South Wales, who converted the existing three-storey building into a bank. In the mid-1880s the original building was upgraded. This building was demolished in 1894. It was replaced in 1895 with a prestigious three storey commercial bank building, including a residence for the Manager on the top two floors.

The new bank was constructed with red face bricks and sandstone carved decorative trimmings and is an exceptional example of the late Victorian Commercial Romanesque Style architecture, and a balance for the Queen Victoria building at the northern end of the precinct which is in a similar style. The building was designed by the architect Varney Parkes, son of the famous politician Sir Henry Parkes.

The building has been altered and extended over the years. In 1910 an extra bay was added on the west side in Bathurst Street and the facade was increased from five to six bays. This extension was designed by the well known firm of architects Robertson & Marks. In 1935, there were a number of internal alterations, including a new stairwell and installation of a lift, which were designed by the architects Peddle Thorp & Walker. The most dramatic change to the building was after the Bank closed in 1980 and the premises recycled for use as a restaurant. In 1980/81 a new mezzanine was added to the original banking chamber. The new design was by architects, McConnel Smith & Johnson, with interior design by Devine Erby Mazlin.

In conclusion, 485 George Street, is probably the finest small bank building (externally) surviving in the city area, and has an historic significance with its use as a bank from 1877 to 1980; over 120 years. It has social significance as a landmark building in the centre of the city, and is both rare and representative for its intact exterior demonstration the design and quality of bank buildings, particularly noting its major construction phase at the end of the 1890s depression. Since the 1980s the building has been used for a string of restaurant uses that service the community who frequent the cinema entertainment area of George Street South. In relation to archaeological significance the site was assessed in 1996 as having no archaeological potential because the building covers the whole site and rests upon a solid sandstone foundation.

Bank of NSW was listed on the New South Wales State Heritage Register on 2 April 1999 having satisfied the following criteria.

The place is important in demonstrating the course, or pattern, of cultural or natural history in New South Wales.

The former Bank building prominently represents the contribution of commerce and the banking industry to the economic wellbeing of NSW in the lat 19th and early 20th Century. The strategic location of the former bank building on the southern edge of Sydney Square, along with the Cathedral and Town Hall contributes to the symbolic and iconic qualities of the civic centre of the city as a "pillar of society". The Bank of NSW recognised the visibility and significance of the item to the community by the selection of a prominent establishment architect and the construction of the Branch in a well-proportioned and restrained Romanesque Revival stylistic language.

The place has a strong or special association with a person, or group of persons, of importance of cultural or natural history of New South Wales's history.

The building has a special association with the Bank of NSW, at the time of construction the oldest established bank in the colony. The building has a close association with the architect Varney Parkes, son of Sir Henry Parkes, Premier of NSW for five terms from 1872 and known as "The Father of Federation". Varney Parkes was also a politician in his own right.

The place is important in demonstrating aesthetic characteristics and/or a high degree of creative or technical achievement in New South Wales.

The former Bank building demonstrates a high degree of aesthetic excellence, demonstrated by its restrained Commercial Romanesque Revival style, massing, materials, ornamentation, and detailing with connotations of institutional vigour, strength and robustness. The 1895 building displays a strong civic presence through its form, scale and prominent location, contributing to the setting of St Andrews Cathedral and Sydney Square. The Bank of NSW's purchase of the site a decade after the completion of the imposing St Andrew's Cathedral, and the construction of a new bank building was intended as a symbolic contribution to Sydney's civic space, and as a highly visible contribution to the national wealth.

The place has a strong or special association with a particular community or cultural group in New South Wales for social, cultural or spiritual reasons.

The former Bank building is strongly associated with the commercial and maritime trading community of Sydney particularly that around Darling Harbour and the extension of commercial activities to the southern part of the city in the later 19th century. The Bank of NSW had strong associations with the Church of England as indicated by the provision of subsidised rental accommodation at the Branch in the 1960s/1970s. The item has nostalgic associations with the cinema-going community in Sydney since 1981 as Pancakes at the Movies, and as part of the development of the George Street cinema and entertainment area in the 1980s.

The place has potential to yield information that will contribute to an understanding of the cultural or natural history of New South Wales.

The loss of the rear curtilage of the former Bank building following the demolition of the Regent Theatre and the full excavation of the site, has removed any archaeological potential to provide additional understanding of the local area.

The place possesses uncommon, rare or endangered aspects of the cultural or natural history of New South Wales.

The former Bank building has rare significance as a prominent and externally intact 19th century bank building in Sydney's CBD, balancing the similarly styled Commercial Romanesque Revival Queen Victoria Markets building at the northern end of Sydney Square. The 19th century civic ensemble of the Town Hall, St Andrew's Cathedral, the QVB and the former Bank building has survived and remained unaltered throughout the redevelopment booms of the later 20th century.

The place is important in demonstrating the principal characteristics of a class of cultural or natural places/environments in New South Wales.

The ground floor banking chamber interior retains the potential to demonstrate the principal characteristics of a bank building of the late 19th century/early 20th century. The current uses have obscured the main bank spaces but have not significantly damaged distinctive elements of the ground floor interior. The former bank building exterior retains the principal characteristics of bank branches in the late 19th century.

== See also ==
- Australian non-residential architectural styles
