= Metro Theatre, Sydney =

Music venue in Sydney, Australia

Metro Theatre

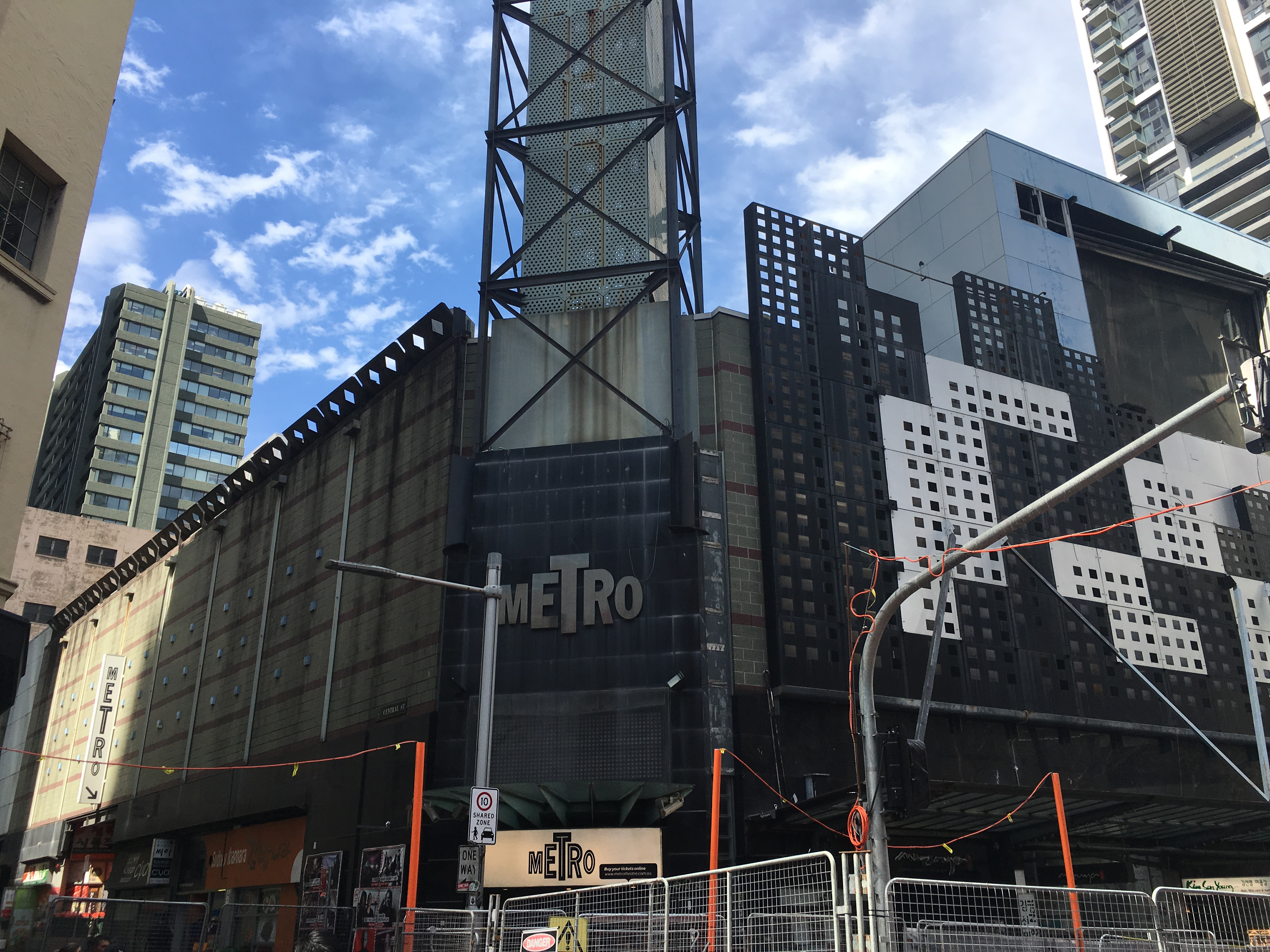
- The Metro Theatre, September 2018
- Interactive map of Metro Theatre
- Address: 624 George St; Sydney NSW 2000
- Location: city centre of Sydney, Australia
- Coordinates: 33.875759°S 151.206776°E
- Owner: Century Venues Group
- Operator: Century Venues Group
- Capacity: 1,550 (The Metro); 350 (Metro Social)

Construction
- Opened: 1994

Website
- Venue Website

The Metro Theatre (commonly the Metro) is a music venue located on George Street in the city centre of Sydney, New South Wales, Australia.

The foyer of the Metro, designed by leading Australian stage designer Brian Thomson, features a lightweight plastic replica of the Art Deco crystal chandelier which once hung in Regent Theatre which formerly stood opposite the Metro in George Street.

Acts that perform at the Metro often include heavy metal music, indie-rock, and alternative bands, often of international fame. It was the venue for the now-legendary Sydney concerts in 1995 by Jeff Buckley and a record seven sold out shows in a row over six days in 1996 by You Am I, among many others.

It has two separate performance spaces inside the building, the Forum (often simply called the Metro) and the Transit Lounge (which, in January 2007, was re-launched and re-branded as the Lair). Up until 2007 it was not uncommon for both spaces to be used on the same night for different acts, with the larger of the two, the Forum, generally hosting the more famous act. Since the launch of the Lair the space has seldom been used for a public performance, as its primary function was to house MTV Australia's the Lair live music programme.

For a brief period in the second half of 2006, the venue was known as the Century Theatre after it went into receivership and was acquired by Century Venues. It was changed back to the Metro Theatre by October 2006.

On 16 September 2009 the Metro was rebranded as the Virgin Mobile Metro, after a sponsorship deal had been made. Dappled Cities Fly and the Seabellies both played at the launch night on 29 September 2009.

== Performing acts at the Metro, Sydney ==
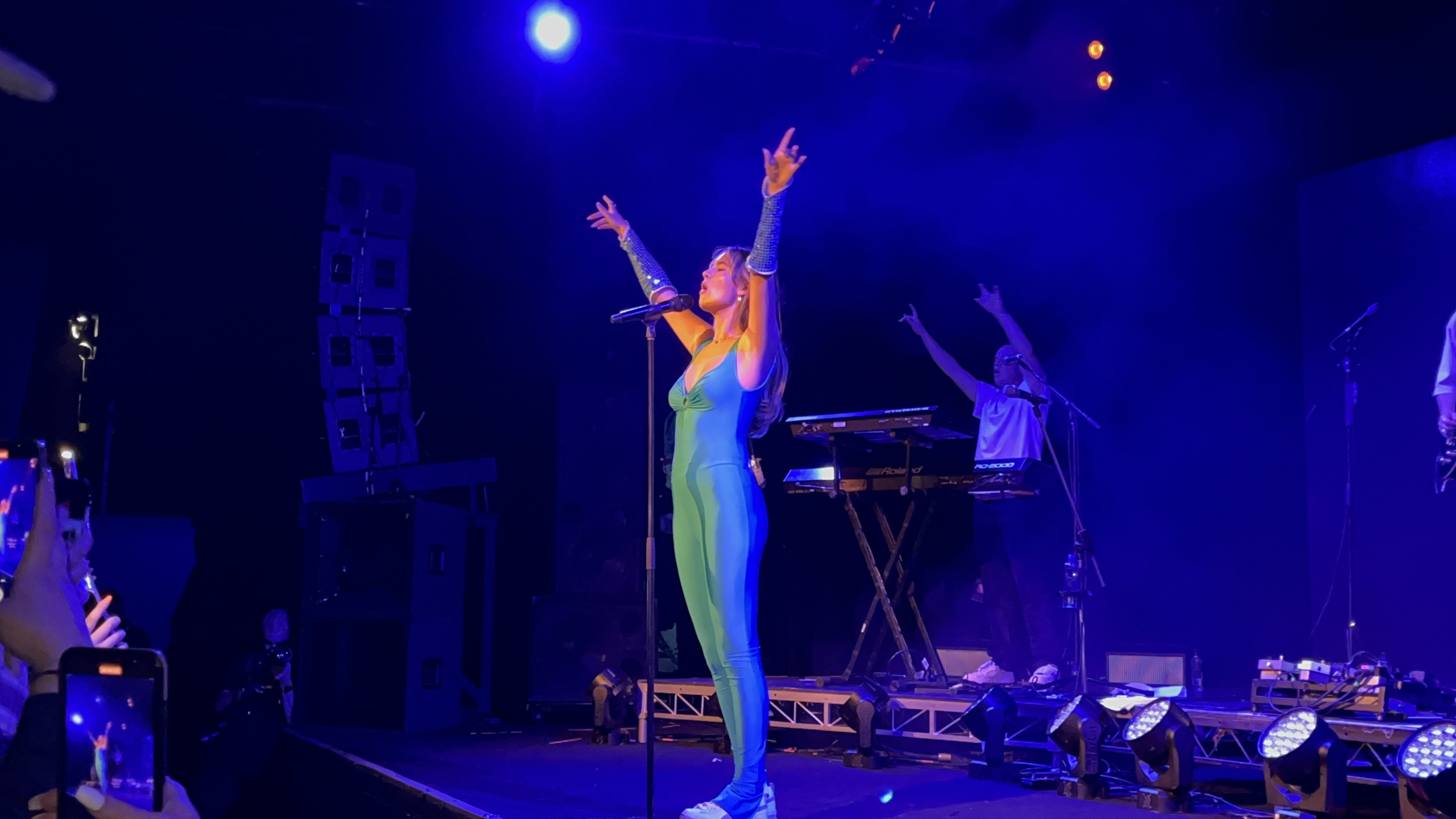
British singer Mimi Webb performing at the venue on 9 September 2022.

A list of some of the more famous musical acts that have performed at the Metro:

Band Name	Genre	Country	Year/s Played
Machine Head	Groove Metal / Thrash Metal	United States	2015
Emperor	Black Metal	Norway	2019, 2023
Cattle Decapitation	Death Metal	United States	2023
Fear Factory	Industrial Metal	United States	2015
Lamb Of God	Groove Metal	United States	2015
Exodus	Thrash Metal	United States	2015
Morbid Angel	Death Metal	United States	1996, 2011, 2014
Hypocrisy	Death Metal	Sweden	2019
Kataklysm	Death Metal	Canada	2019
Obituary	Death Metal	United States	2020
Hour of Penance	Technical Death Metal	Italy	2014
Fit For an Autopsy	Deathcore	United States	2018, 2023
Emmure	Deathcore	United States	2018
Wormrot	Grindcore	Singapore	2020
Devildriver	Groove metal, Melodic death metal	United States	2019
All That Remains	Metalcore, heavy metal	United States	2019
Static-X	Industrial metal, Nu metal	United States	2009, 2019, 2023
Dope	Nu metal	United States	2019
Wednesday 13	Gothic Metal	United States	2019
Dimmu Borgir	Symphonic Black metal	Norway	2018
Cradle of Filth	Extreme metal	United Kingdom	2009, 2018, 2019, 2024
Arch Enemy	Melodic death metal	Sweden	2023
At The Gates	Melodic death metal	Sweden	2012
Sevendust	Alternative Metal	United States	2016
Killswitch Engage	Metalcore	United States	2018
Seether	Post-grunge / Hard rock	South Africa	2008, 2012, 2015, 2018
From The Jam	New wave	United Kingdom	2016
Flosstradamus	Trap	United States	2015
Anthrax	Thrash Metal / Rock	United States	2004
John Mayer	Rock / Acoustic Rock	United States	2009
Lorde	Pop / Electropop	New Zealand	2013
Nightwish	Symphonic Metal	Finland	2005
Blink 182!	Punk rock / Punk Pop	United States	2009
Foo Fighters	Alternative rock	United States	2005
Coldplay	Alternative rock	United Kingdom	2001
Muse	Alternative rock	United Kingdom	2004
Doves	Indie rock	United Kingdom	2000
Alestorm	Folk Metal	Scotland	2019,2022
Kaiser Chiefs	Indie rock	United Kingdom	2012
The Dandy Warhols	Indie rock	United States	1998
Flyleaf	Hard rock	United States	2013
Neil Finn	Rock / Pop	New Zealand	2001
The Eels	Indie rock	United States	2006
Thrice	Post Hardcore	United States	2008
Ladytron	Synthpop	United Kingdom	2008
Anathema	Doom Metal / Progressive rock	United Kingdom	2014
DragonForce	Power Metal	United Kingdom	2008
Covenant	EBM	Sweden	2008
KMFDM	Industrial	Germany	2004
Behemoth	Blackened Death Metal	Poland	2010, 2015
The Hives	Garage rock	Sweden	2008
Propagandhi	Punk rock	Canada	2009; 2019
Billy Talent	Punk rock	Canada	2009
Salt-N-Pepa	Hip-hop	United States	2010
Calexico	Indie rock	United States	2010
Sven Väth	Techno	Germany	2010
HIM	Gothic rock	Finland	2014
ZZ Top	Blues rock	United States	2014
Cannibal Corpse	Death Metal	United States	2014
Dinosaur Jr	Alternative rock	United States	1995
The Prodigy	Techno	United Kingdom	1996
Aphex Twin	IDM / Electronic	United Kingdom	2004
Queensrÿche	Heavy metal	United States	2006
Hard-Fi	Indie rock/Alternative rock	United Kingdom	2007
Aneurysm	Industrial Metal	Italy	2011
Booker T. Jones	R&B	United States	2017
McBusted	Pop-Punk	United Kingdom	2015
The Script	Pop rock	Ireland	2012; 2014
Bastille	Pop rock	United Kingdom	2013
You Me at Six	Pop-Punk	United Kingdom	2010; 2015
Calum Scott	Pop	United Kingdom	2018
Freya Ridings	Pop/Soul	United Kingdom	2020
Rebecca Black	Pop	United States	2022
Mimi Webb	Pop	United Kingdom	2022
Maisie Peters	Pop	United Kingdom	2023
Evanescence	Rock	United States	2025
Travis Scott	Hip Hop, Pop	United States	2016

Australian acts that have played there include:

- Sia
- The Vines
- The Smith Street Band
- Short Stack
- Angela's Dish
- You Am I
- Eskimo Joe
- Pete Murray and the Stonemasons
- Alex Lloyd
- Spiderbait August 2014
- Something for Kate
- Gyroscope
- Sugar Army
- Young and Restless
- Angelspit
- Mortal Sin
- 5 Seconds of Summer
- 360
- Safia
- Jet
- Parkway Drive
- Thy Art Is Murder
- Polaris
- Psycroptic
- Sam Fischer
- Justice for the Damned
- Last Dinosaurs
