= Aneurysm (disambiguation) =

An aneurysm is a localized, blood-filled balloon-like bulge in the wall of a blood vessel.

Aneurysm may also refer to:

- Aneurysm (band), an Italian metal band
- "Aneurysm" (song), by American rock band Nirvana
