= Sydney Trocadero =

Historic concert hall in Sydney, Australia

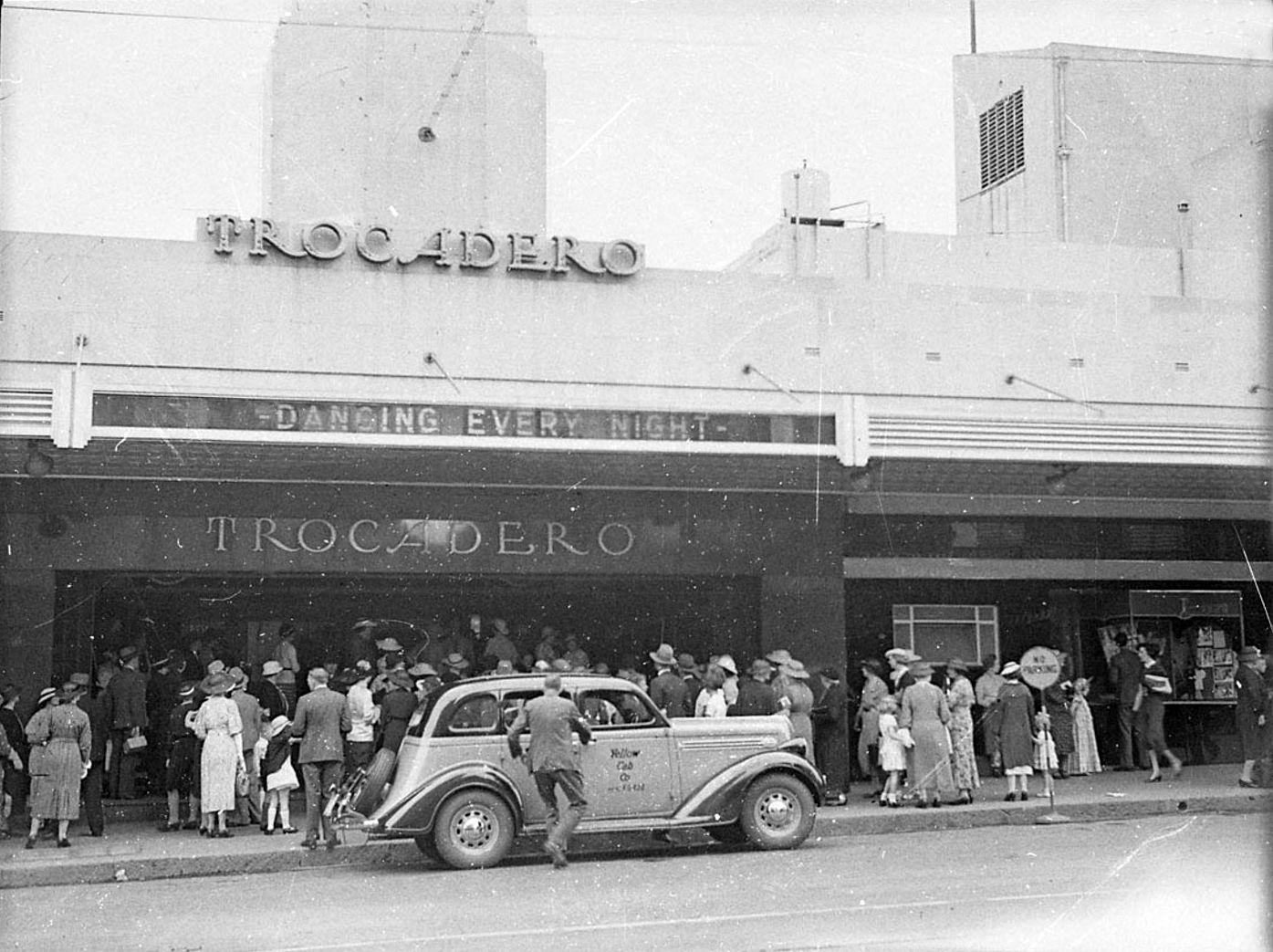
- Sydney's Trocadero in 1937

General information
- Location: George Street, Sydney
- Coordinates: 33°52′30″S 151°12′23″E

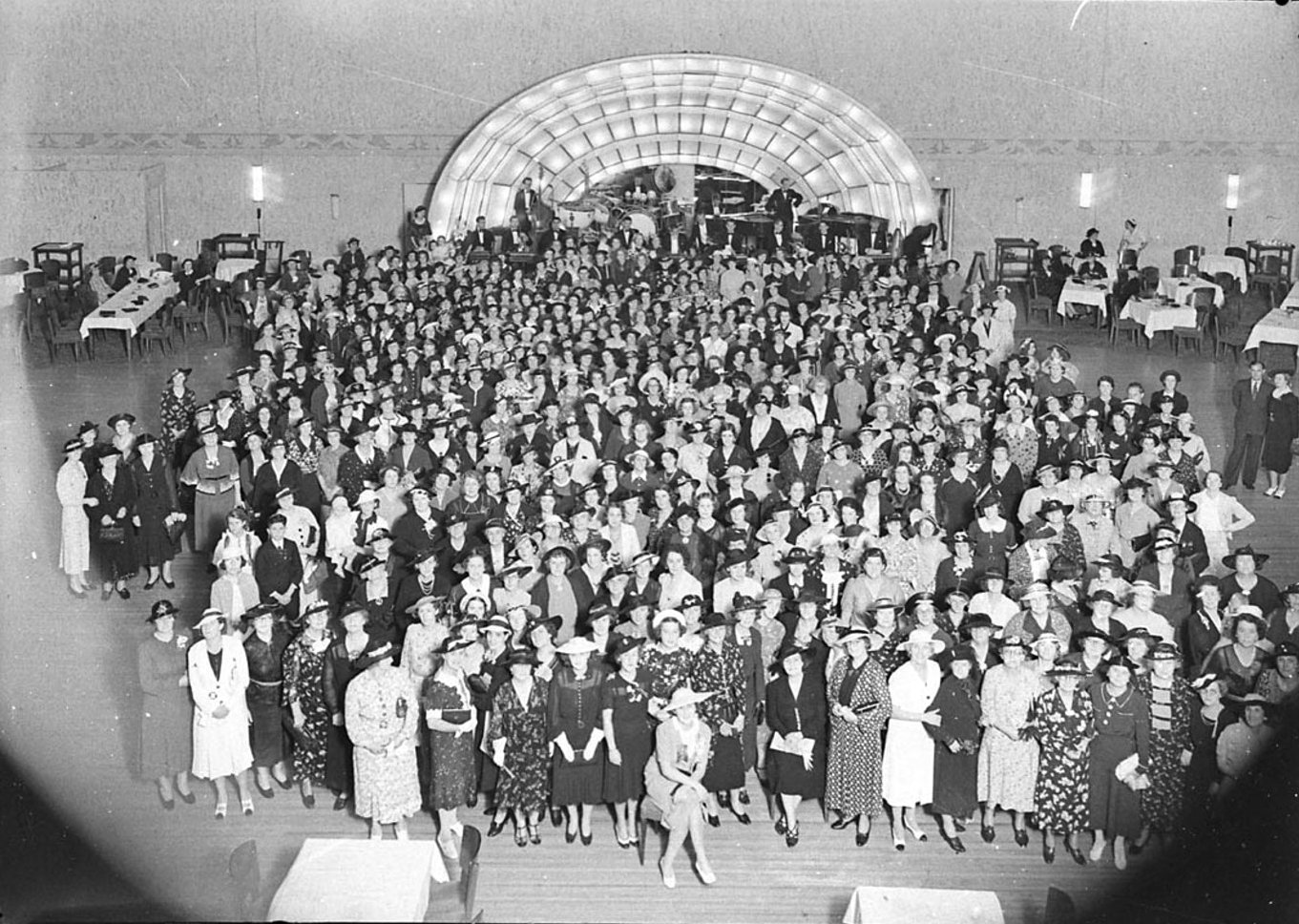
2CH party, Trocadero, 15 December 1937

The Sydney Trocadero was a large Art Deco dance and concert hall that operated between 1936 and 1971 in Sydney, Australia. It was the main venue of Big Band jazz orchestras, with the resident Trocadero Orchestra under the baton of Frank Coughlan, and the All Girl Trocadero Band. Often referred to as "The Troc", it was once regarded as the "most glamorous dance palace in Sydney and accommodated up to 2,000 people". It was the favored venue for university and school 'formals', and hosted many important local rock and pop concerts during the 1960s.

== Location ==
The Trocadero was located on the western side of George Street, south of Bathurst Street, next door to the now demolished Hoyts Regent Theatre.

== History ==
The venue opened with a full-dress gala on 3 April 1936. It was one of a number of venues in Sydney for balls. Others included the Palais Royale, the David Jones Auditorium and the Blaxland Galleries. Art Students' Balls and Artists' Balls continued to be held at the Trocadero through the 1950s and up till the early 1960s over a period when dance music encompassed a wide range of styles including swing and Australian jazz in the early years, to foxtrot, waltz and tango in the later ones.

The Sydney Trocadero was closed on 5 February 1971; the building was demolished and replaced by a modernist cinema complex owned by Hoyts.

1,500 Guests Jostle At Artists' Ball - Hundreds of people thronged the pavements outside the Trocadero last night to watch the guests, many of whom were wellknown cartoonists, artists, actors, models, and radio personalities, arrive at the annual Artists' Ball. At 10 o'clock, an hour after the dance started, about 1,500 people jostled one another on the floor. Some dancers were in elegant evening clothes, some in street wear, but the majority wore the "fanciest" of fancy costumes that their ingenuity could devise. Murals designed by the president of the ball committee, Mr Stanley Cross, and executed by students of the Technical College decorated the walls. Guests also used ingenuity in decorating the tables, one of which sprouted a row of five-foot high palm trees, another effigies of scarecrows, and a third a table-length model of an illuminated ferry-boat. The ball was in aid of a Graphic Art Centre, where the work of creative and commercial artists can be co-ordinated. Sydney Morning Herald 5 November 1949.

== Cultural references ==
The closure of the venue is commemorated in the song "Deep Water" by Australian singer-songwriter Richard Clapton.

== See also ==
- 107-109 Bathurst Street, Sydney
