= Hyde Park Obelisk =

Heritage-listed obelisk in Sydney, Australia

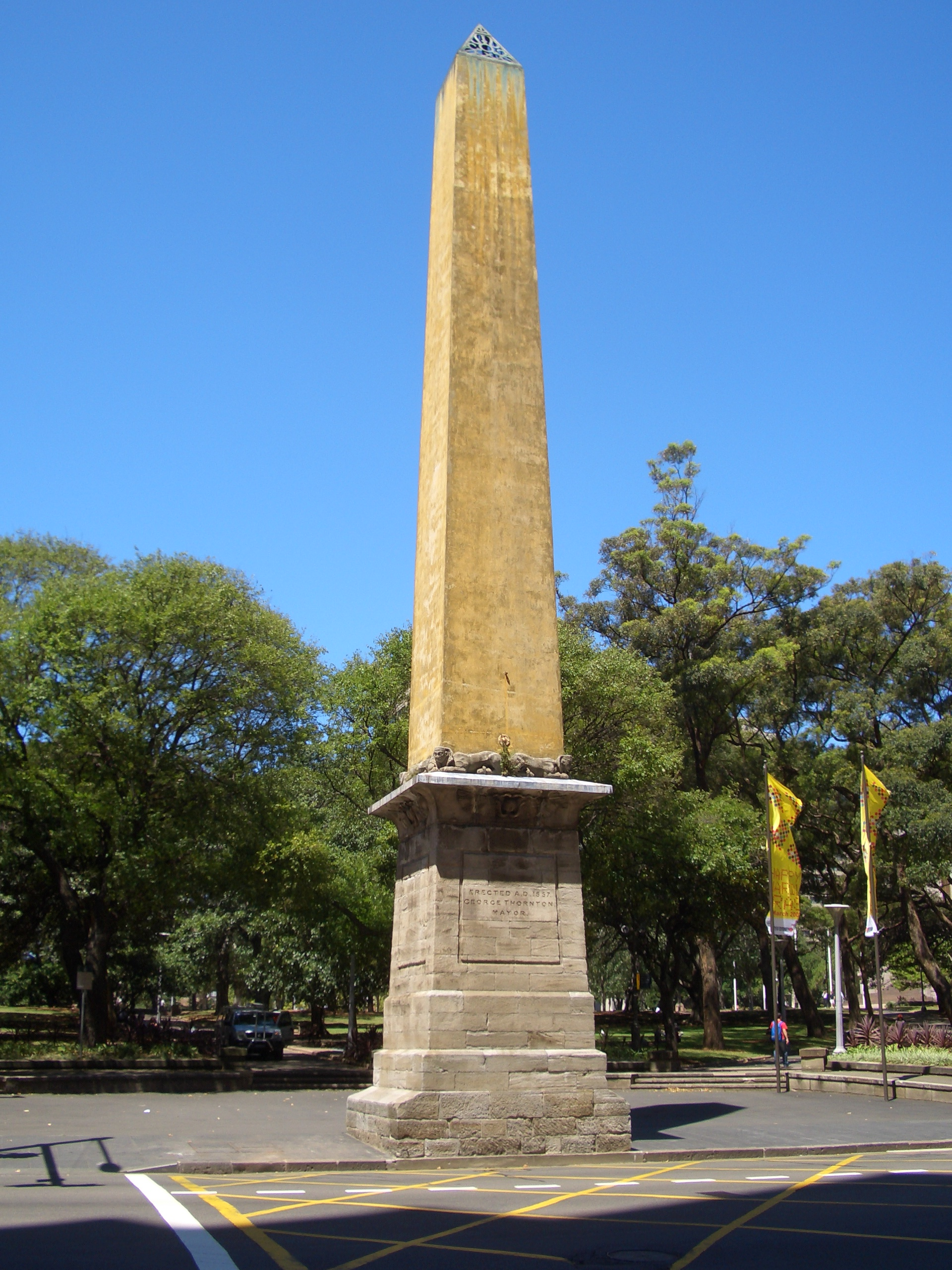
- Hyde Park Obelisk, as viewed from Bathurst Street.

- Location within Sydney
- Alternative names: Thornton's Scent Bottle

General information
- Status: Completed
- Type: Obelisk, sewer vent
- Architectural style: Victorian Egyptian
- Location: Junction of Bathurst and Elizabeth Streets, Sydney, New South Wales, Australia
- Coordinates: 33°52′29″S 151°12′36″E
- Opened: 1857
- Client: Sydney Municipal Council
- Owner: Sydney Water

Height
- Height: 22 metres (72 ft)

Technical details
- Material: Sydney sandstone; Filigreed bronze pyramid

Design and construction
- Architecture firm: NSW Department of Public Works

New South Wales Heritage Register
- Official name: Sewer Vent; The Obelisk; Obelisk Sewer Vent
- Type: State heritage (built)
- Designated: 15 November 2002
- Reference no.: 1642
- Type: Other – Utilities – Sewerage
- Category: Utilities – Sewerage
- Builders: Public Works Department

The Hyde Park Obelisk is a heritage-listed obelisk that served as a sewer vent and is now a monument located in Hyde Park at the intersection of Elizabeth Street and Bathurst Street, in the Sydney central business district, New South Wales, Australia. It was designed and built by the NSW Department of Public Works. It is also known as The Obelisk and Obelisk Sewer Vent. It is also jokingly referred to as Thornton's Scent Bottle after mayor George Thornton. The obelisk is owned by Sydney Water, an agency of the Government of New South Wales. It was added to the New South Wales State Heritage Register on 15 November 2002.

Completed in the Victorian Egyptian style, it was modelled on Cleopatra's Needle on the banks of London's River Thames. The overall structure is 22 metres (72 ft) high, including the square sandstone base which is 6.5 metres (21 ft) high. The vent at the top is a filigreed bronze pyramidion.

== History ==
There are two types of sewer vents within the Sydney Water system: educt and induct. Induct vents draw air into a sewerage system to aerate the pipelines. Educt vents allow gases to escape when the gas is lighter than air. The shape of the cowling on the older types of vents were set to produce either eduction or induction whenever there is a natural breeze. This is an educt shaft, a simple masonry shaft modelled on Cleopatra's Needle (now situated on the Thames Embankment, London) and erected in 1857 during the period of George Thornton as Mayor of Sydney. Vents are for the safety of personnel as well as to prevent corrosion by chemical decay. The ventilation of sewers is a very important facet of continued operation of a sewerage system; poor ventilation can result in serious odour problems and breakdown in fabric.

Unveiled in 1857 by Mayor Thornton, it served as a sewerage duct vent to allow the escape of noxious gases from the sewer (although it now ventilates the stormwater system, following works to separate Sydney's sewerage and stormwater systems). The Hyde Park Obelisk was the first special sewer ventilation shaft built in Sydney and New South Wales, and is the only example of a sewer ventshaft constructed of sandstone within the Sydney Water system.

On 7 November 2014, the Hyde Park Obelisk was covered with a giant pink condom as a temporary installation to raise awareness about HIV, primarily in Sydney's LGBTIQ community.

== Description ==
Completed in 1857, the obelisk is a simple masonry shaft consisting of a sandstone base and decorative bronze ventilator apex. It was built to ventilate Sydney's first planned sewerage system which was constructed by the Municipal Council. Sydney's first planned sewerage system consisted of five harbour outfalls. The only means of ventilating this system was a sandstone ventshaft, which was erected at Hyde Park (corner of Bathurst and Elizabeth St) in 1857. As the sewerage system developed, it became obvious that ventilation of the system was inadequate and some form of ventilation was necessary.

In 1875, the Sydney City and Suburban Health Board recommended in its Sixth Progress Report, that two sewerage schemes be constructed to deal with the health problems being faced due to the pollution within Sydney Harbour. From that period, several methods of ventilating the sewers were investigated to deal with the disease, odour, pressure and chemical problems being experienced within the sewers.

Of the methods investigated and adopted, including street vents, house vents (cast iron traps and water traps) and flues, the tall ventshafts were determined by J. M. Smails in several reports to the government of the day, to be the most efficient way of dispersing the pressure and gases found within the sewers.

Initially, after the Obelisk, ventshafts were constructed using bricks, were ornate and fairly major features in the city landscape. This technology was replaced with smaller, steel tube vents, which were used at intervals of approximately every 350 metres (1,150 ft) of sewer. The Oberlisk remains considerably intact apart from alterations to its base.

=== Further information ===
See inventories for the Main Northern Ocean Outfall Sewer, Lewisham Sewer Ventshaft, Marrickville Sewer Ventshaft, Glebe and Bellevue Hill Sewer Ventshafts for other details relating to sewer vents.

== Heritage listing ==
The first planned sewerage system in the city of Sydney was completed in 1857. The Obelisk was the first major sewer vent constructed and the only ventshaft constructed entirely of sandstone. The Obelisk Vent was an ambitious achievement at the time of construction owing to its utilitarian purpose. It is historically significant as one of the oldest items of infrastructure in the early City sewerage system. It has landmark qualities, providing a fitting terminus to the eastern end of Bathurst Street.

It is also significant for its contribution to the streetscape of Elizabeth Street, its visual role in the axial vistas of Sydney, and as a significant object within Hyde Park.

Sewer Vent was listed on the New South Wales State Heritage Register on 15 November 2002 having satisfied the following criteria.

The place is important in demonstrating the course, or pattern, of cultural or natural history in New South Wales.

The Obelisk was the first sewer ventshaft built to eliminate noxious gases from the sewer at levels that would not be detected by the residents of the city. The vent shaft was built to replace the street gratings that had been used to ventilate the sewer system.

The place is important in demonstrating aesthetic characteristics and/or a high degree of creative or technical achievement in New South Wales.

The Obelisk is a sandstone vent shaft which displays the classical architecture and technology of the late nineteenth century. It is a landmark feature within Hyde park and Sydney, which is visible as a major feature at the end of Bathurst Street.

The place has a strong or special association with a particular community or cultural group in New South Wales for social, cultural or spiritual reasons.

It is significant in the development of the ventilation of the sewerage system of Sydney and has been identified by the National Trust Australia (NSW).

The place has potential to yield information that will contribute to an understanding of the cultural or natural history of New South Wales.

The design and placement of the Obelisk was used to understand the behaviour of gases within the sewerage system and how to best design vents to help eliminate the gases safely. The vent shaft was also to relieve the gaseous pressure that built up within the sewer system.

The place possesses uncommon, rare or endangered aspects of the cultural or natural history of New South Wales.

The Obelisk is unique in NSW. It is one of the oldest items of infrastructure in the early city sewerage system. It was the first vent shaft built to eliminate noxious gases from the city's sewer system.

The place is important in demonstrating the principal characteristics of a class of cultural or natural places/environments in New South Wales.

The Obelisk Sewer Ventshaft is the only example of a sewer ventshaft constructed of sandstone within the Sydney Water system, but is representative of sewer ventilation methods.

== Gallery ==
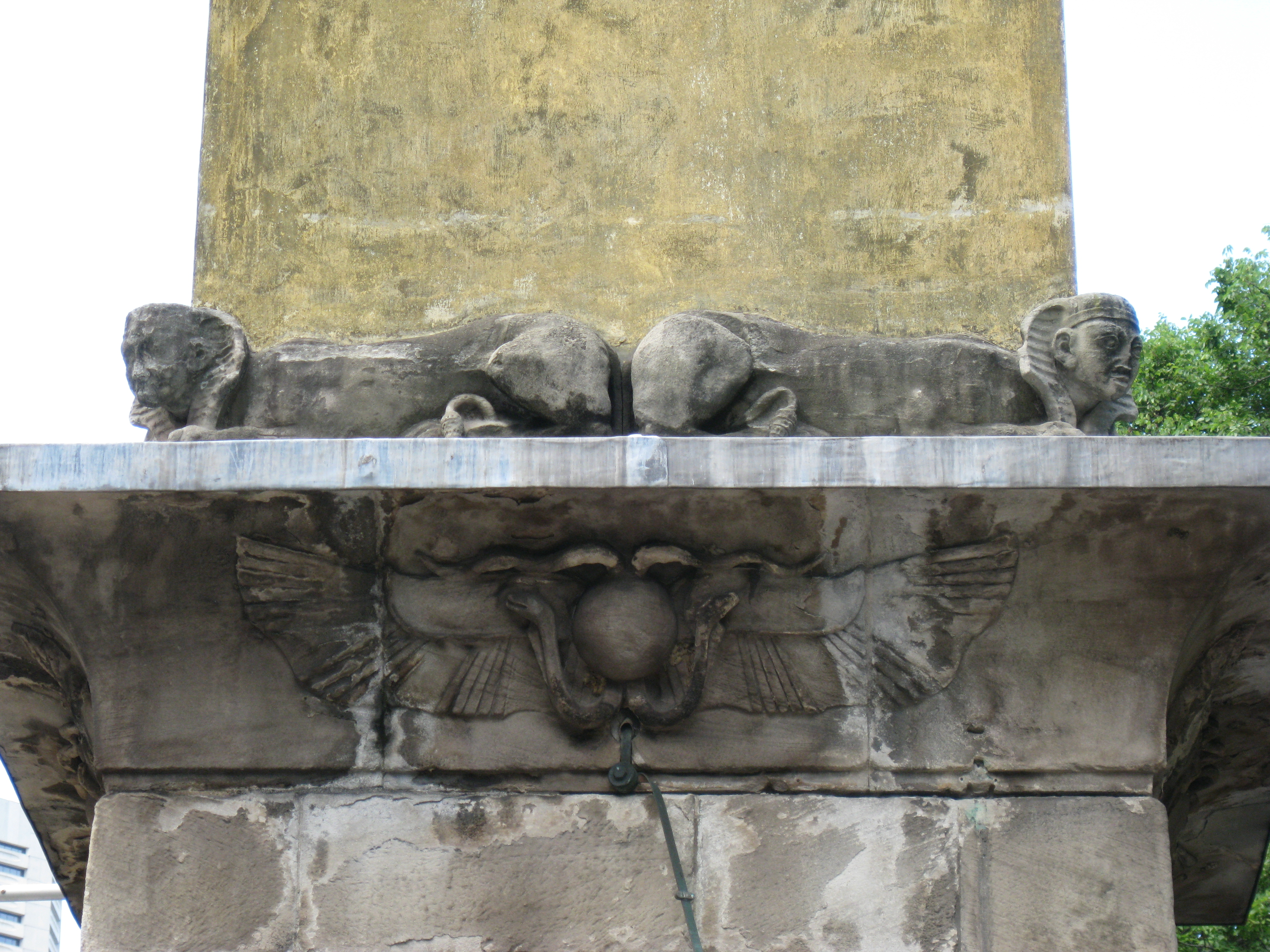
Egyptian style Sphinxes and serpents adorn the Obelisk.

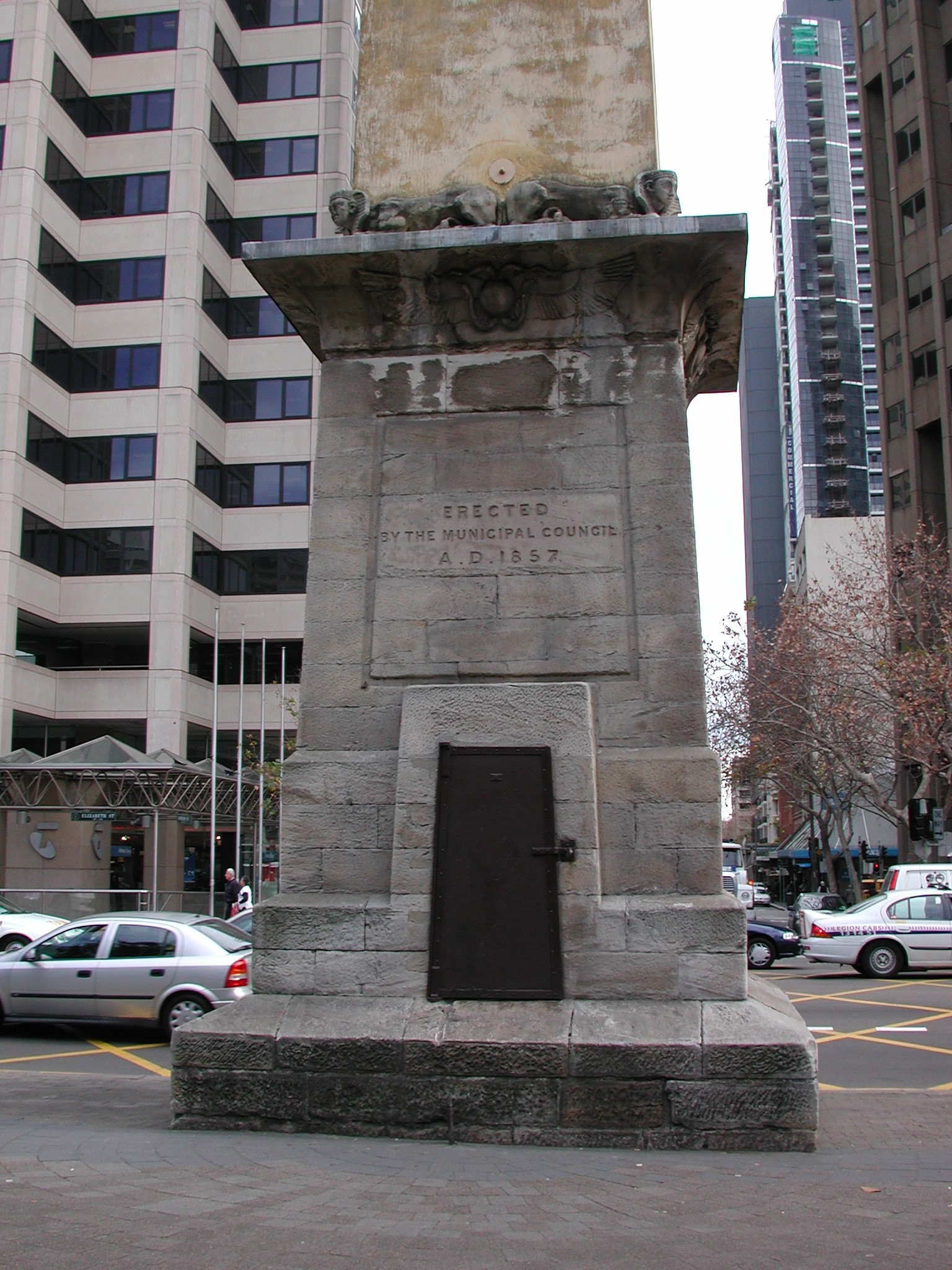
East side of Obelisk, showing maintenance access door as well as the sphinxes and other features

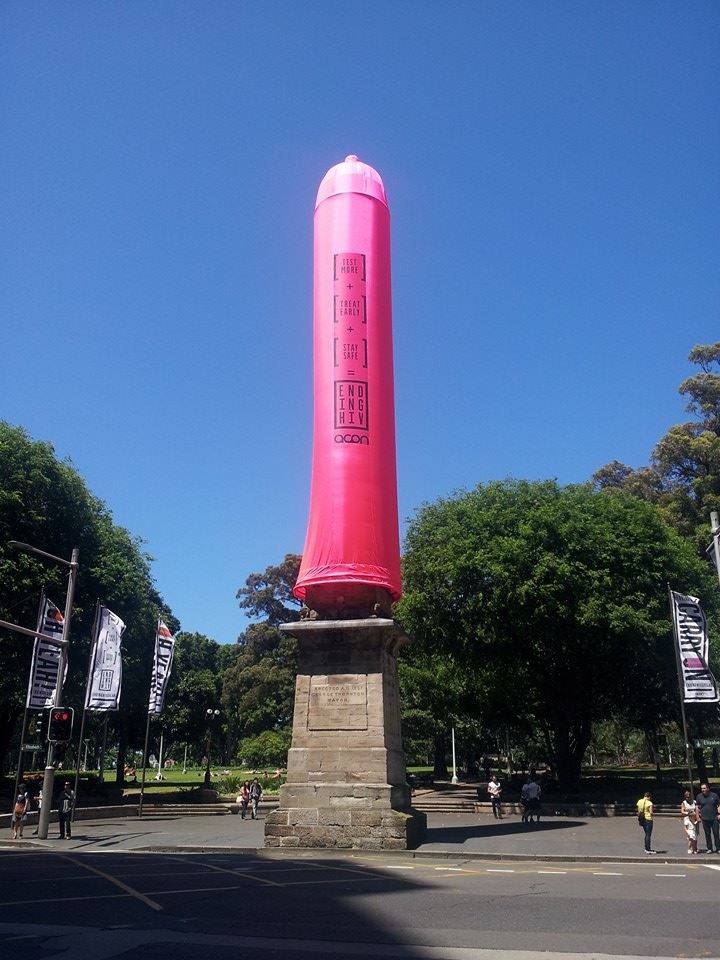
Temporary installation of a giant condom over the Obelisk in November 2014 to raise awareness of HIV/AIDS

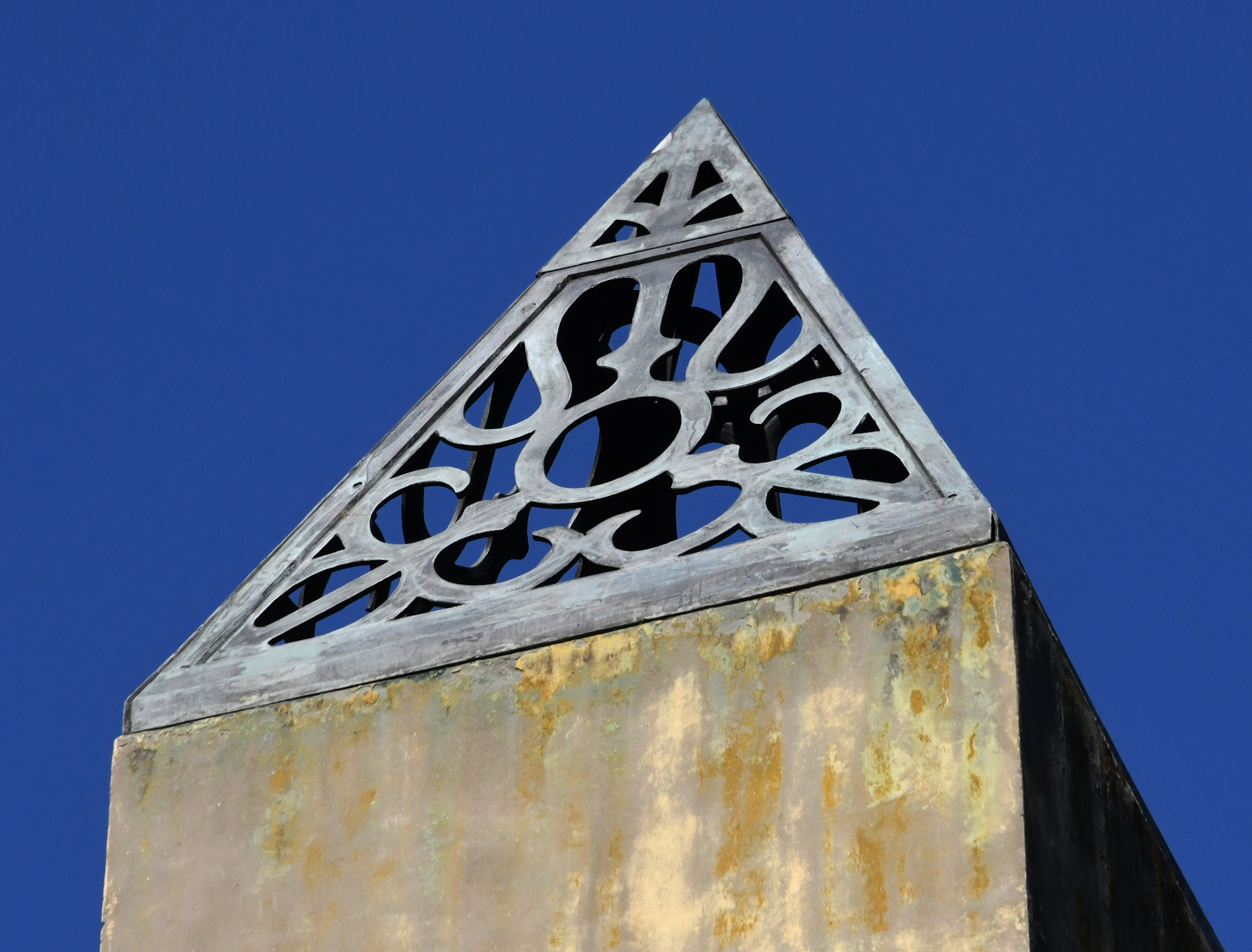
Bronze pyramidion on top of Obelisk

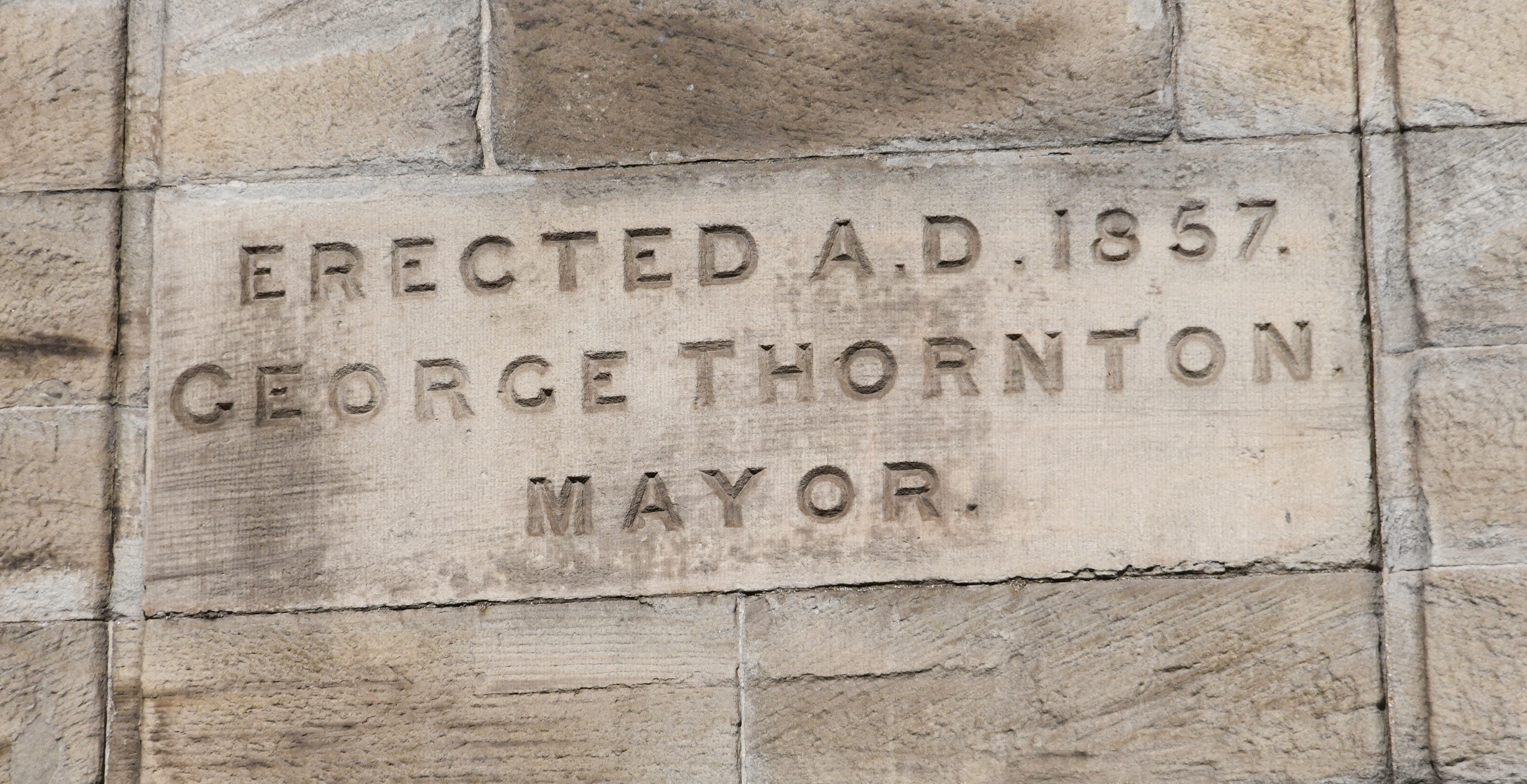
Dedication on west side of Obelisk

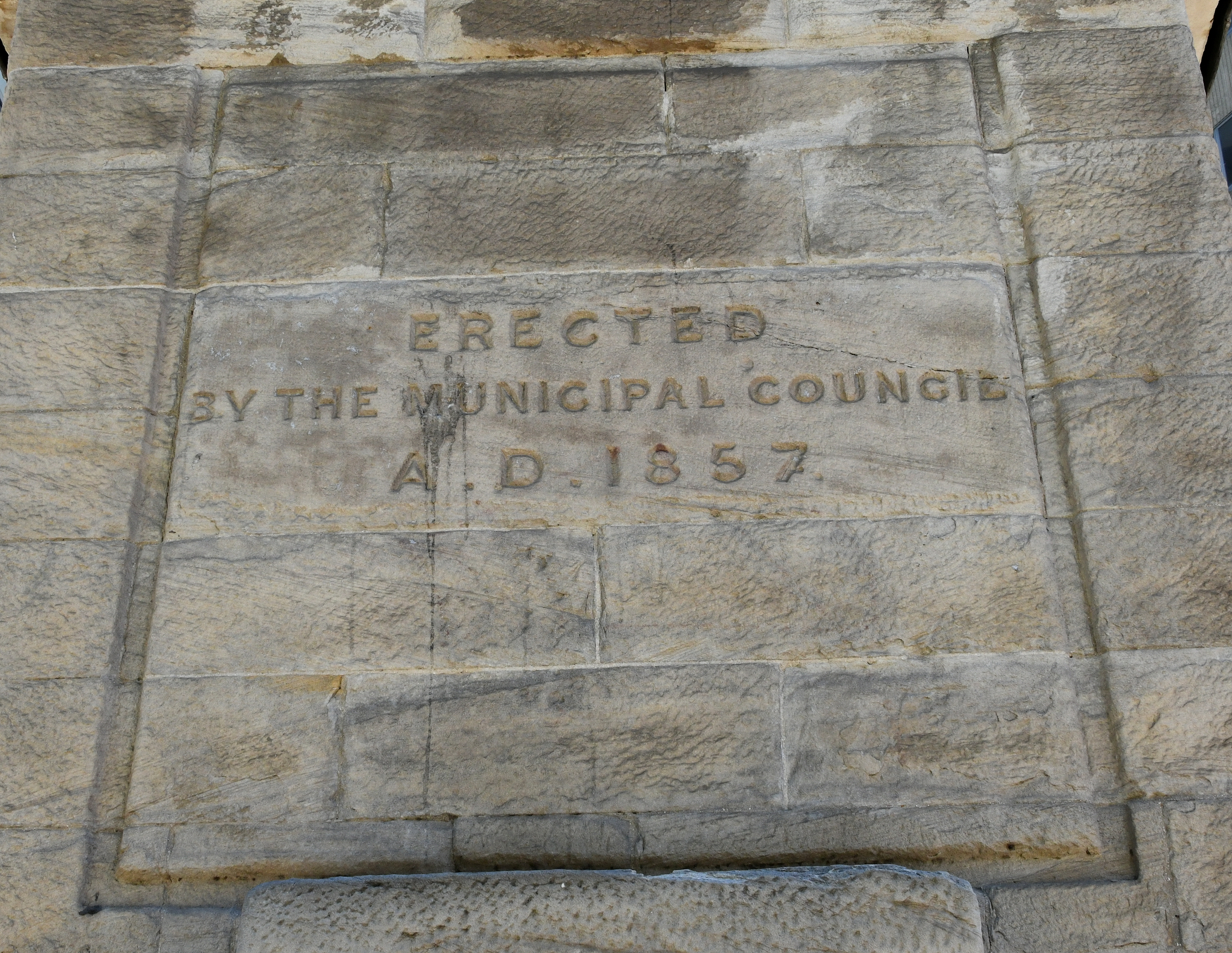
Dedication on east side of Obelisk

== See also ==
- Australian non-residential architectural styles
