= Frank Coughlan =

Australian musician

Frank James Coughlan
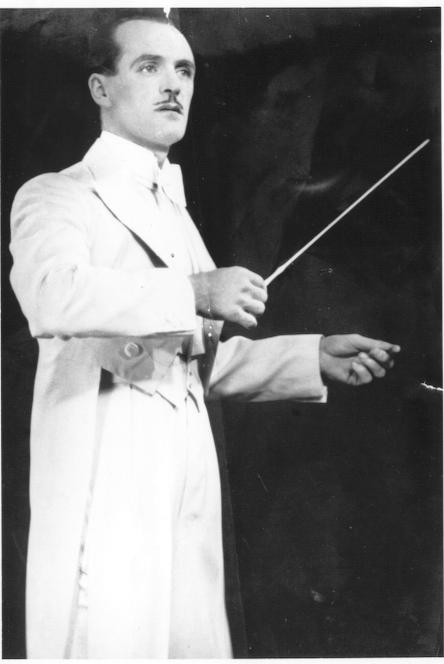
- Frank Coughlan (1936)

Background information
- Born: June 7, 1904; Emmaville, New South Wales, Australia
- Died: April 6, 1979 (aged 74) Randwick, New South Wales, Australia
- Genres: Jazz
- Occupations: musician, band leader
- Instruments: trombone, trumpet

Frank James Coughlan (7 June 1904 – 6 April 1979) was an Australian jazz musician and band leader. He is described in the Australian Dictionary of Biography as "One of the most influential musicians in the development of jazz in Australia."

Coughlan was born in Emmaville, New South Wales. His father William was a tin miner and leader of the Glen Innes and District band, and taught all his five sons to play brass instruments.

Coughlan moved to Sydney in 1922. He played trombone and trumpet, arranged music, and led the band at the Sydney Trocadero both before and after service in World War II. He died 6 April 1979 at Randwick, New South Wales, aged 74.

== Biography ==
On 7 June 1904 in the mining town of Emmaville, New South Wales, Frank Coughlan was born the third son of William and Elizabeth Coughlan. In 1912, his father took the position of the District and Glen Innes Band Master and taught his five sons to play brass instruments. When Coughlan was nineteen, he moved to Sydney, Australia in New South Wales with his family. While there, Coughlan began a music performance career that lasted forty-nine years. 'Miff' Mole, the American trombonist, inspired Coughlan's musical approach, and he began playing at the local Bondi Casino in Will James's dance band. Coughlan was skilful in dance band music and his career started with Will James's dance band. Two years later, in 1924, he joined a sensational band called the Californians, which allowed him to travel more around Australia. As "the first jazz group to come to Australia," the Californians provided him with "his first experience with dance music and jazz." It was with this band that Coughlan developed most in skill and style and even made his introduction into the world of arranging. The band also enabled Coughlan to discover and hone the skills which made him the highly sought after musician he grew to be.

Coughlan loved jazz music, studied it feverishly, and sought to play as much as he could with as many musicians as he could. England welcomed Coughlan and his wife in 1929, and he was privileged to perform at prestigious venues such as the Kit Kat Club and the Savoy Hotel, Claridges, among others. His recording experience at that time was shared with Fred Elizalde, Arthur Rosebery, Jack Hilton's Band, and the New Mayfair Orchestra. The Great Depression shortened his stay abroad to one year, after which he returned to Australia and worked "in dance bands in Melbourne and Sydney." After returning home from his British excursion, Coughlan developed into one of (if not the most) influential characters in the progression of Australian Jazz.

Six years after returning to Australia, Frank's reputation culminated in a job as band director for Sydney's newest jazz and dance club, the Trocadero. At the opening of the club in April 1936, Coughlan directed his orchestra, marking the start of his almost thirty-five-year residence there. Around this same time, swing music became popular in Sydney. Coughlan's band was able to adapt and continue to provide music the people enjoyed.

Coughlan remained at the Trocadero until 1942, at which point he was drafted into the Australian Militia for World War II. From 1942 to 1946, he was active in the Militia and Australian Imperial Force. He was promoted to sergeant in 1945. While in the military, Coughlan was able to use his talents to entertain troops. The military transferred him from unit to unit, providing him with the opportunity to perform and encourage soldiers all over Australia. In that setting, he played until 1946 when he was discharged, and he returned to lead at the Trocadero once again. When the Trocadero closed in 1970, Coughlan retired. He died in 1979.

== Experience at the Trocadero ==
Often hailed as "the Father of Australian Jazz," Coughlan remained dedicated to jazz throughout his life, and his playing conveyed "an innate understanding and feeling for its every aspect." As an arranger, trumpet-player, and trombonist, Coughlan not only made an indelible mark on the jazz world, but also encouraged and advanced many young performers' careers.

Coughlan was an outstanding musician whose playing was emulated by many aspiring Australian jazz musicians. The "Father of Australian Jazz" drew inspiration from listening to visiting white American jazz (or dance) orchestras that primarily came from the West Coast. Frank Ellis and his Californians were a group that particularly influenced many of Coughlan's early compositions and arrangements. Coughlan led a thirteen piece jazz orchestra at the opening of the Trocadero in 1936. This 'palais' (Dance Hall) band was one of the finest in Australia and the public relied on Coughlan for the latest styles in dance music. The orchestra, whose formation coincided with the advent of swing music, played swing as well as commercial music. Coughlan's big band gained so much popularity that it was featured in a 1936 film entitled The Flying Doctor which included the Trocadero band in a nightclub sequence. In 1938 Coughlan was elected president of the Sydney Swing Music Club and began writing articles on the history of Australian jazz in the Australian Music Maker and Dance Band News. In the same year, some band members introduced their rendition of Dixieland jazz.

Coughlan's band also made several records which were extremely popular in Australia. He went on to lead the Jazz Orchestra until his service in the Australian military from 1942 to 1946. When Coughlan returned from his military stint, he continued to lead the jazz orchestra at the Trocadero until the night club closed on 5 February 1971
