= Regent Theatre, Sydney =

Former cinema and entertainment venue in Sydney, Australia

Regent Theatre
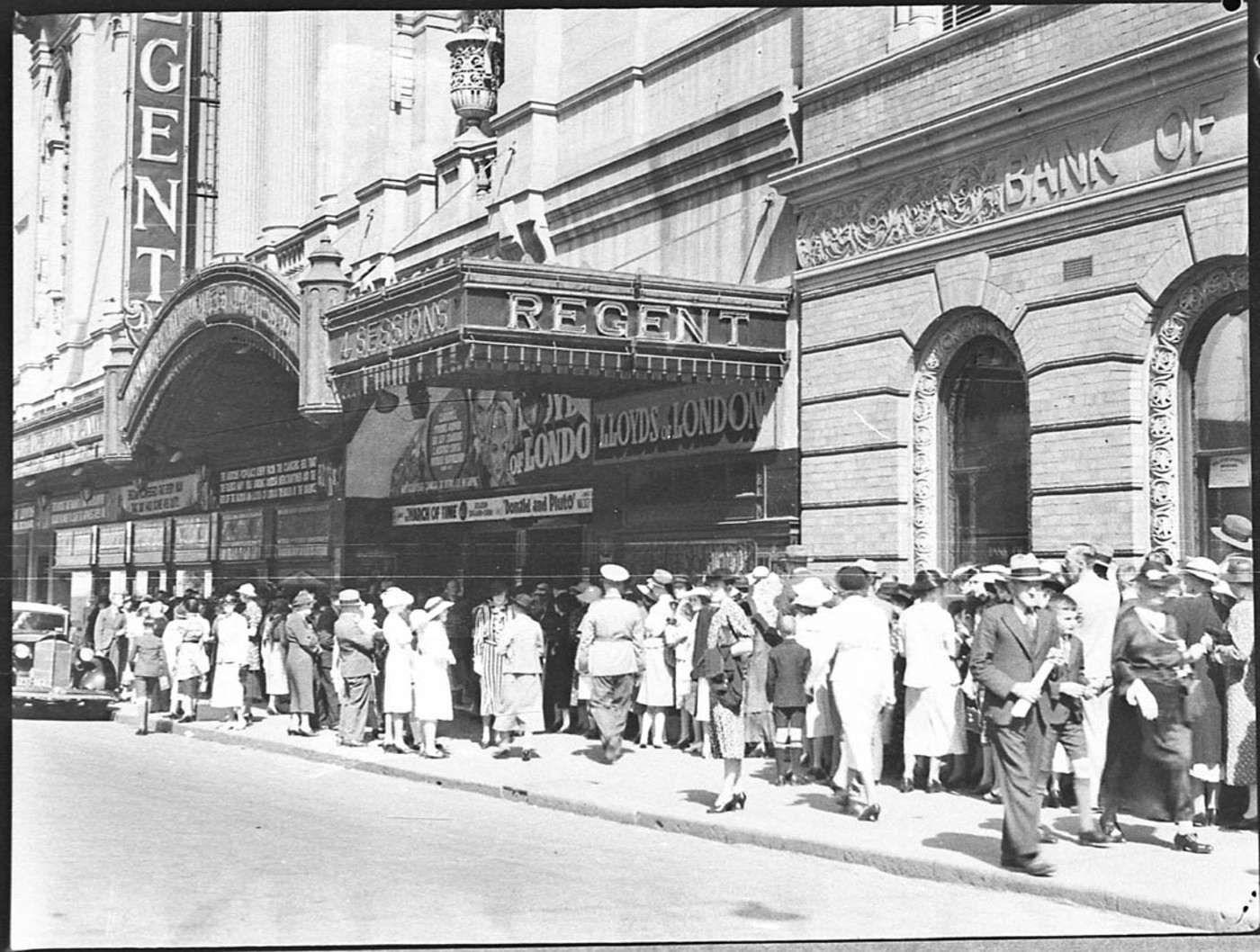
- Interactive map of Regent Theatre
- Address: 487-503 George Street; Sydney, NSW; Australia
- Coordinates: 33°52′29″S 151°12′23″E
- Owner: Hoyts
- Capacity: 2258

Construction
- Opened: 9 March 1928
- Closed: 26 May 1984
- Demolished: 1988
- Architect: Cedric Ballantyne

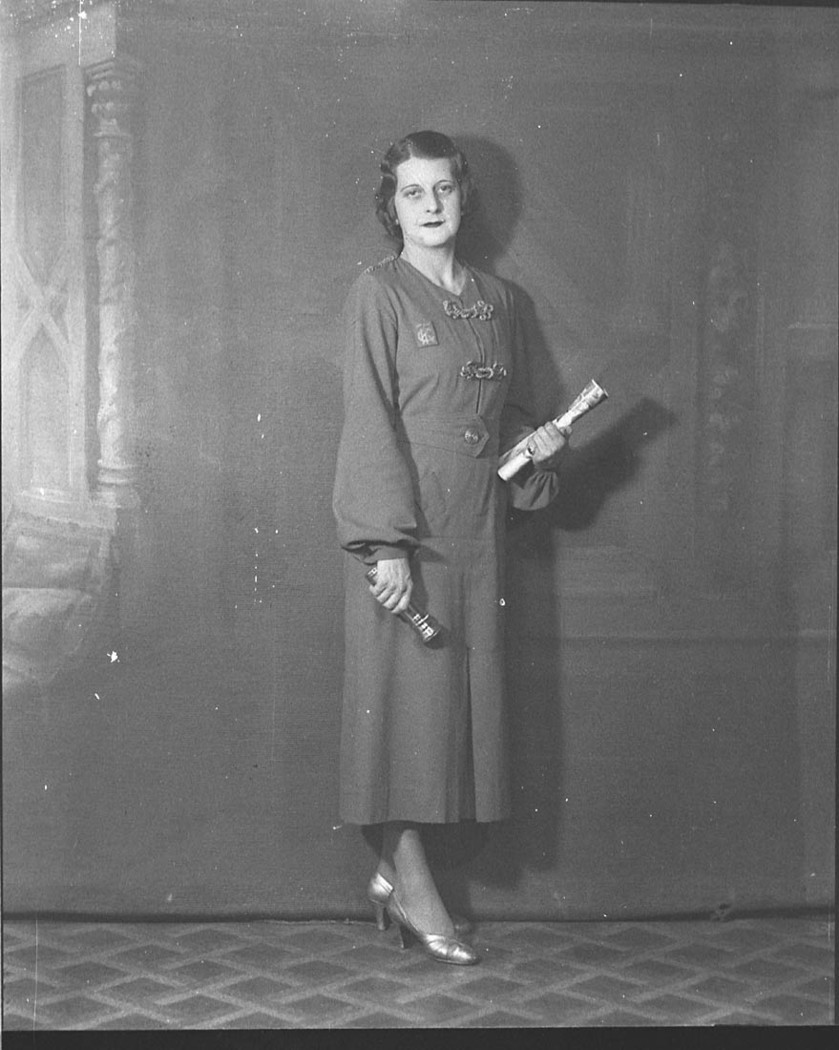
Regent Theatre cinema usher, 1936

The Regent Theatre was a heritage-listed cinema and entertainment venue in George Street, Sydney, New South Wales, Australia, built in 1928 as a flagship for Hoyts, and was demolished in 1988 by property developer Leon Fink.

== Description and history ==
The Regent Theatre was Hoyts' showcase "picture palace" in Sydney, designed by Melbourne architect Cedric Ballantyne, and built by James Porter & Sons. The 2,297-seat Regent Theatre opened its doors in the heart of the city's entertainment district on 30 March 1928 with Flesh and the Devil, starring Greta Garbo and John Gilbert. The Regent Theatre had a resident 40-piece orchestra, as well as a Wurlitzer theatre pipe organ. In appearance, it resembled the theatre of the same name in Adelaide, which was also designed by Ballantyne in association with local architects, and opened in June 1928. Ballantyne was a noted theatre architect, who had also designed the Regent Theatre, Melbourne and the Regent Theatre, Ballarat for Hoyts Theatres director Francis W. Thring.

The theatre was located at 487-503 George Street, Sydney, near the Sydney Town Hall. It stood next door to the famed Sydney Trocadero dance hall, which was demolished in 1971.

The Regent operated as a cinema for most of its life, including the premiere Sydney season of Ken Russell's film version of Tommy in 1975 (presented in "Quintaphonic" sound), but from the mid-1970s to the mid-1980s it was also a popular venue for music concerts and stage shows, and in its final years hosted many large-scale musicals and performances by the Australian Opera and Australian Ballet and other theatrical and musical performances, including Marcel Marceau, Debbie Reynolds, Barry Humphries, the musical Barnum, Liza Minnelli, The Dance Theatre of Harlem, Tangerine Dream, and "The Two Ronnies" (Ronnie Barker & Ronnie Corbett),

== Closure and demolition ==
The theatre closed with a screening of the documentary Ski Time on 26 May 1984. The last live performance was by American musician Ellen McIlwaine on 19 May 1984.

In 1974, the trade union Actor's Equity asked the Builders Labourers Federation to place a green ban to prevent demolition of the theatre.

In the late 1970s many meetings of the Australian Broadcasting Commission Staff Association were held there at very reasonable rates, the owner being sympathetic to the trade union.

Demolition commenced in late 1988 after a court decision upheld the lifting of the permanent conservation order by the Minister for Planning and Local Government, David Hay.

The slump in the Sydney property market that followed meant that the site remained a vast hole in the ground until 2004, when work finally began on a new high-rise building complex.

Many of the theatre's fittings were sold at an auction in 1990, and can be found in a number of locations around Sydney and NSW. A lightweight plastic replica of the Art Deco crystal chandelier from the Regent's foyer now hangs in the foyer of the nearby The Metro Theatre; redeveloped from a cinema, it is now the city's leading rock music venue. The fate of the original chandelier, from which the Metro's copy was made, is unknown.

The theatre had been listed on the Register of the National Estate, but this did not prevent its demolition by property magnate Leon Fink. Leon Fink was in business with well known property magnate and major organised crime figure, Abe Saffron, who was also a major share owner.

The remodelled Regent Melbourne which has been converted for live performance still exists, as does the Regent Theatre, Dunedin in New Zealand, which serves as both a live performance venue and a cinema.

== See also ==
- State Theatre (Sydney)
- List of destroyed heritage
- Architecture of Sydney
