= Kent Street, Sydney =

Road in Sydney, Australia

Kent Street, Sydney New South Wales

General information
- Type: Street
- Length: 2.2 km (1.4 mi)

Major junctions
- Southern end: Liverpool Street; Sydney CBD
- Druitt Street; Bathurst Street; Market Street; King Street; Erskine Street; Margaret Street; Argyle Street
- Northern end: Windmill Street; Millers Point, Sydney

Kent Street is a street in Sydney, Australia. Originally named Soldiers Back Row, it was renamed Kent Street after the Duke of Kent.

Kent Street runs south–north from Liverpool Street in the Sydney central business district to Windmill Street in Millers Point. Originally a two way road throughout, in connection with the opening of the Western Distributor, on 27 July 1980 the section between Liverpool and Erskine streets was converted to one way in a northerly direction.
