= Bathurst Street, Sydney =

Street in Sydney, Australia

Bathurst Street, Sydney New South Wales
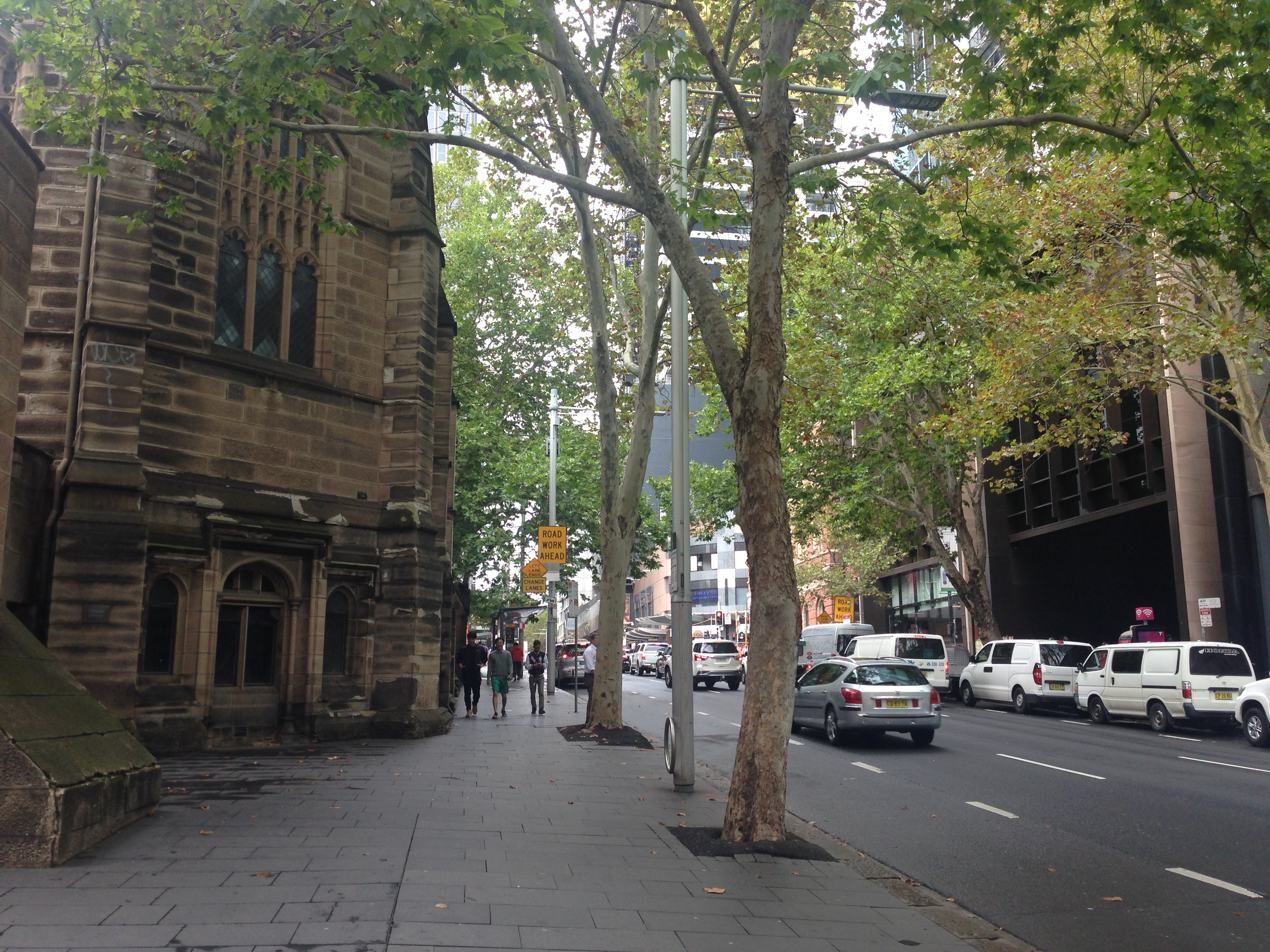
- Bathurst Street
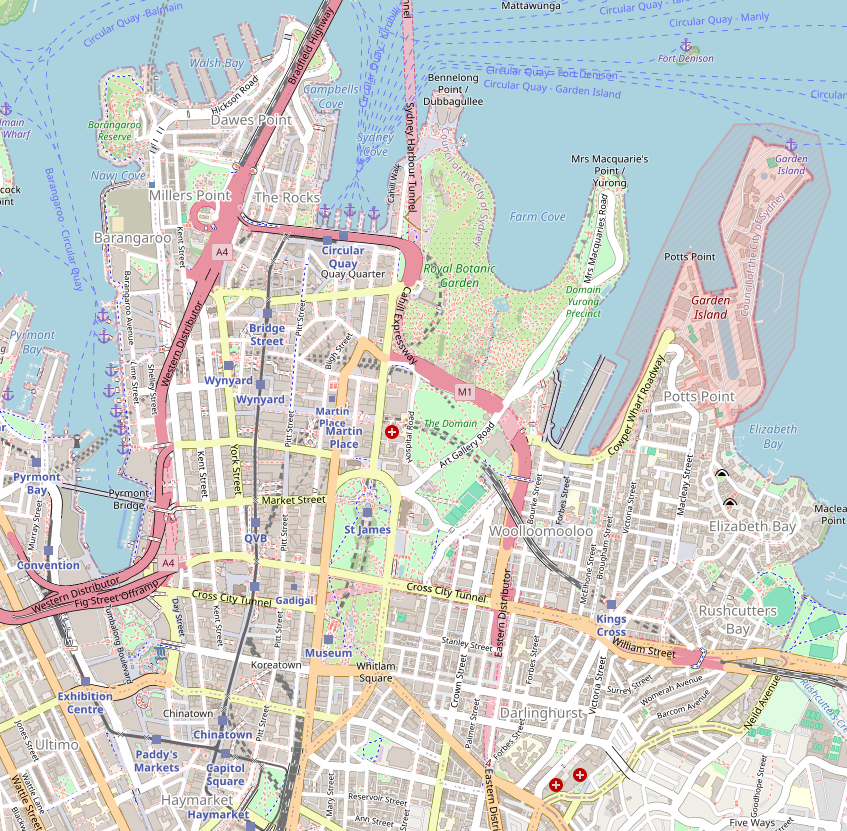
- Coordinates: 33°52′26″S 151°12′10″E (West end); 33°52′29″S 151°12′35″E (East end)

General information
- Type: Street
- Length: 650 m (0.4 mi)

Major junctions
- West end: Harbour Street; Sydney CBD
- Sussex Street; Kent Street; George Street; Pitt Street; Castlereagh Street
- East end: Elizabeth Street; Sydney CBD

Bathurst Street is a street in the Sydney central business district in New South Wales, Australia. Bathurst Street runs for 650 metres (2,130 ft) in a west–east direction with traffic flowing in this direction only. It is situated in the southern portion of the central business district. The western terminus of Bathurst Street is at Harbour Street, Darling Harbour, with the eastern terminus at Elizabeth Street, adjacent to Hyde Park.

From west to east, Bathurst Street crosses Sussex, George, Pitt, and Castlereagh streets.

Bathurst Street was named by Governor Macquarie in honour of Henry Bathurst, 3rd Earl Bathurst, the UK Secretary of State for War and the Colonies between 1812 and 1827. In conjunction with the opening of the Glebe Island Bridge, in December 1995 a bus lane was opened from Harbour to George Streets.

== Landmarks ==
- The Hyde Park Obelisk, at the eastern end of Bathurst Street, was erected in 1857 and unveiled by the Mayor, George Thornton. The monument is actually a sewer vent, and soon the joke around town was to call it 'Thornton's Scent Bottle'. The obelisk is an example of the Victorian Egyptian style and was based on Cleopatra's Needle in London. It is listed on the NSW State Heritage Register.
- The Church of England St Andrew's Cathedral sits on the north-west corner of Bathurst Street and George Street. It was designed by Edmund Blacket and was listed on the Register of the National Estate.
- The former Bank of New South Wales building sits on the south-west corner of Bathurst Street and George Street. It was designed by Varney Parkes and built in 1894 in the American Romanesque style. It is listed on the NSW State Heritage Register.
- The Vintage building is situated on the corner of Bathurst and Sussex Streets. It was built in the 1890s and was just one of many warehouses that sprang up in the area because of its proximity to Darling Harbour. It was used as a flour mill while owned by Aitken and Son; later owners included Mungo Scott Ltd. In 1979 it was converted to residential apartments.
- 107–109 Bathurst St – Former Bank of NSW

== Gallery ==
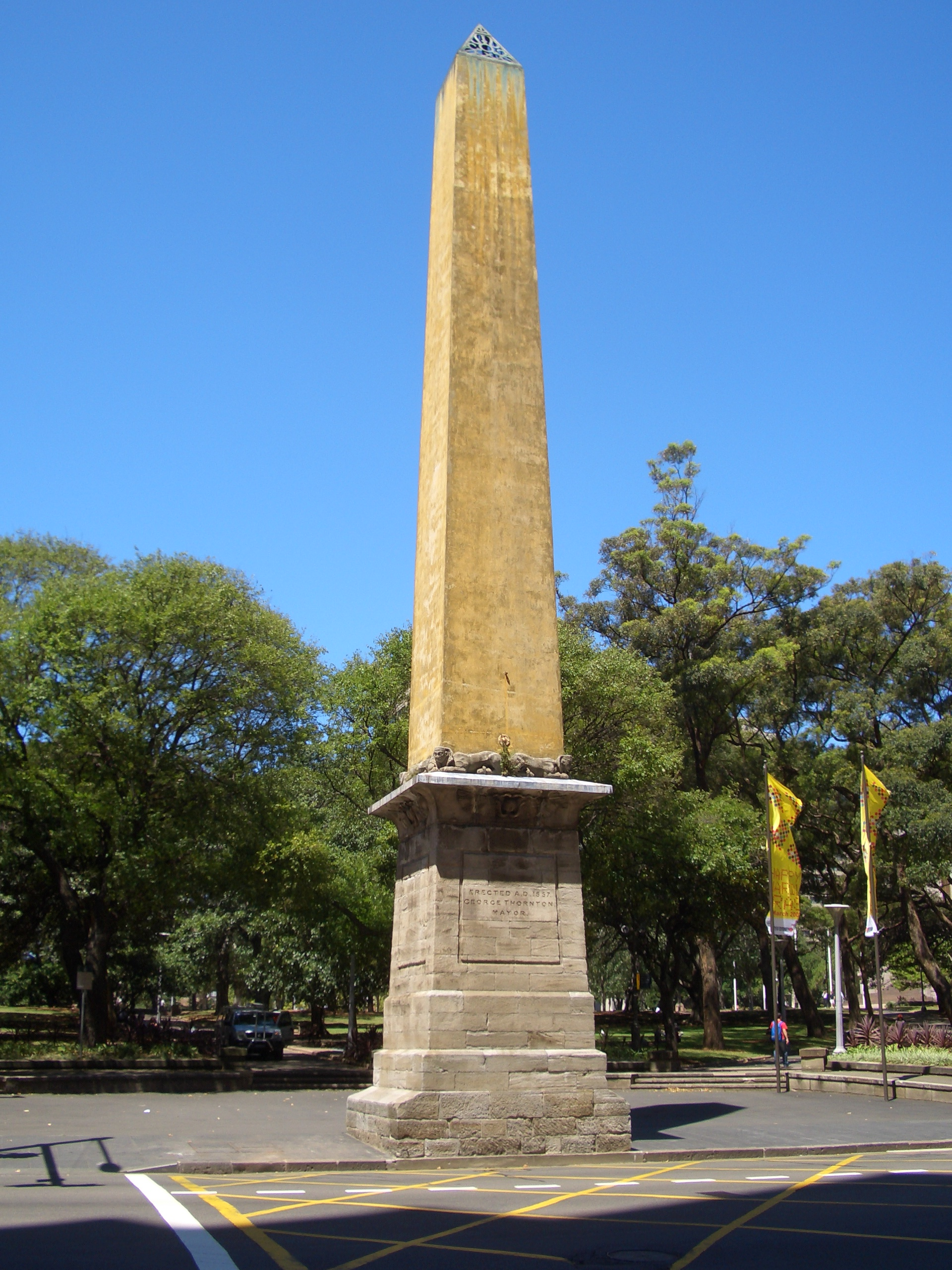
Hyde Park Obelisk

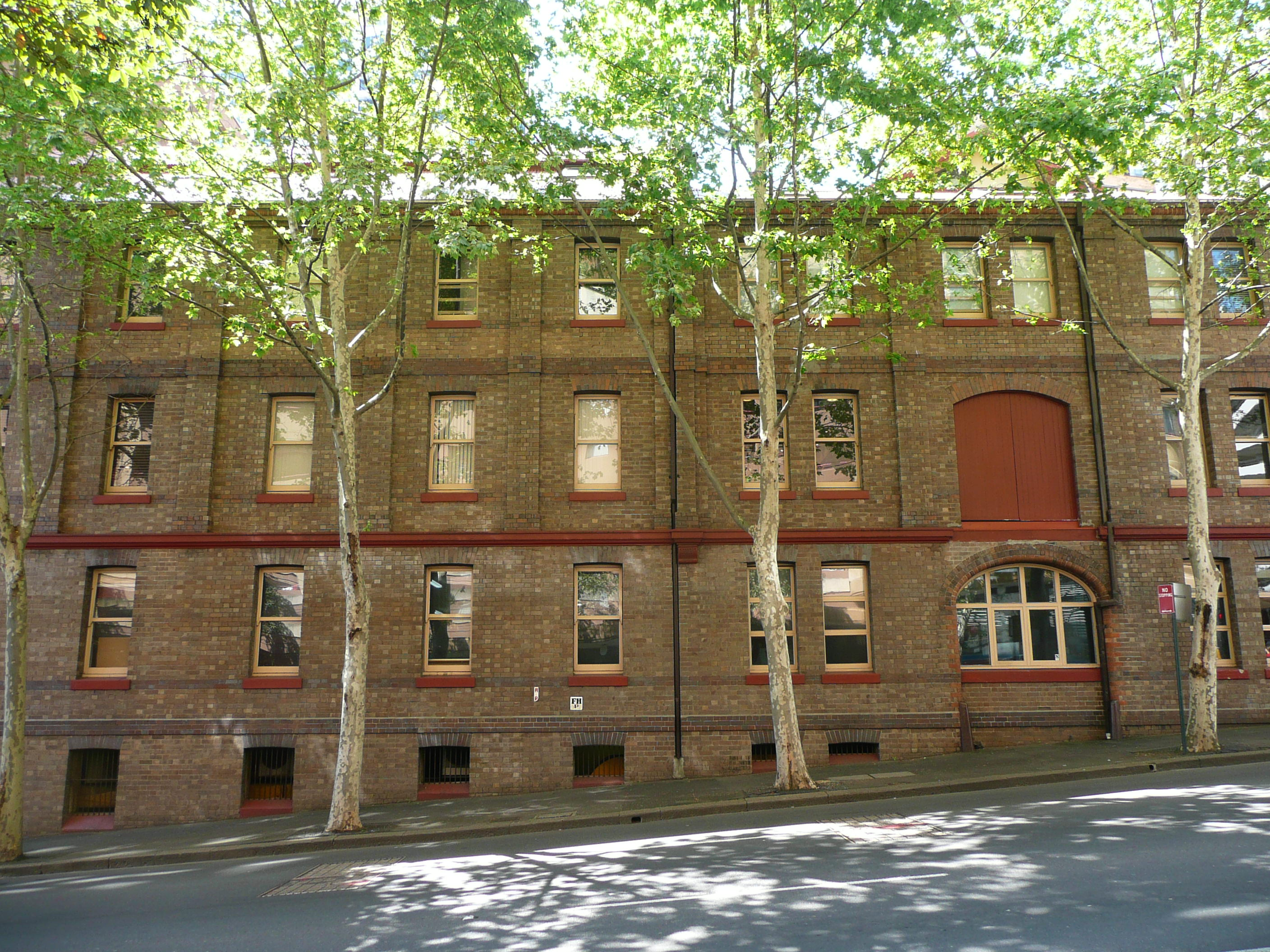
The Vintage Building

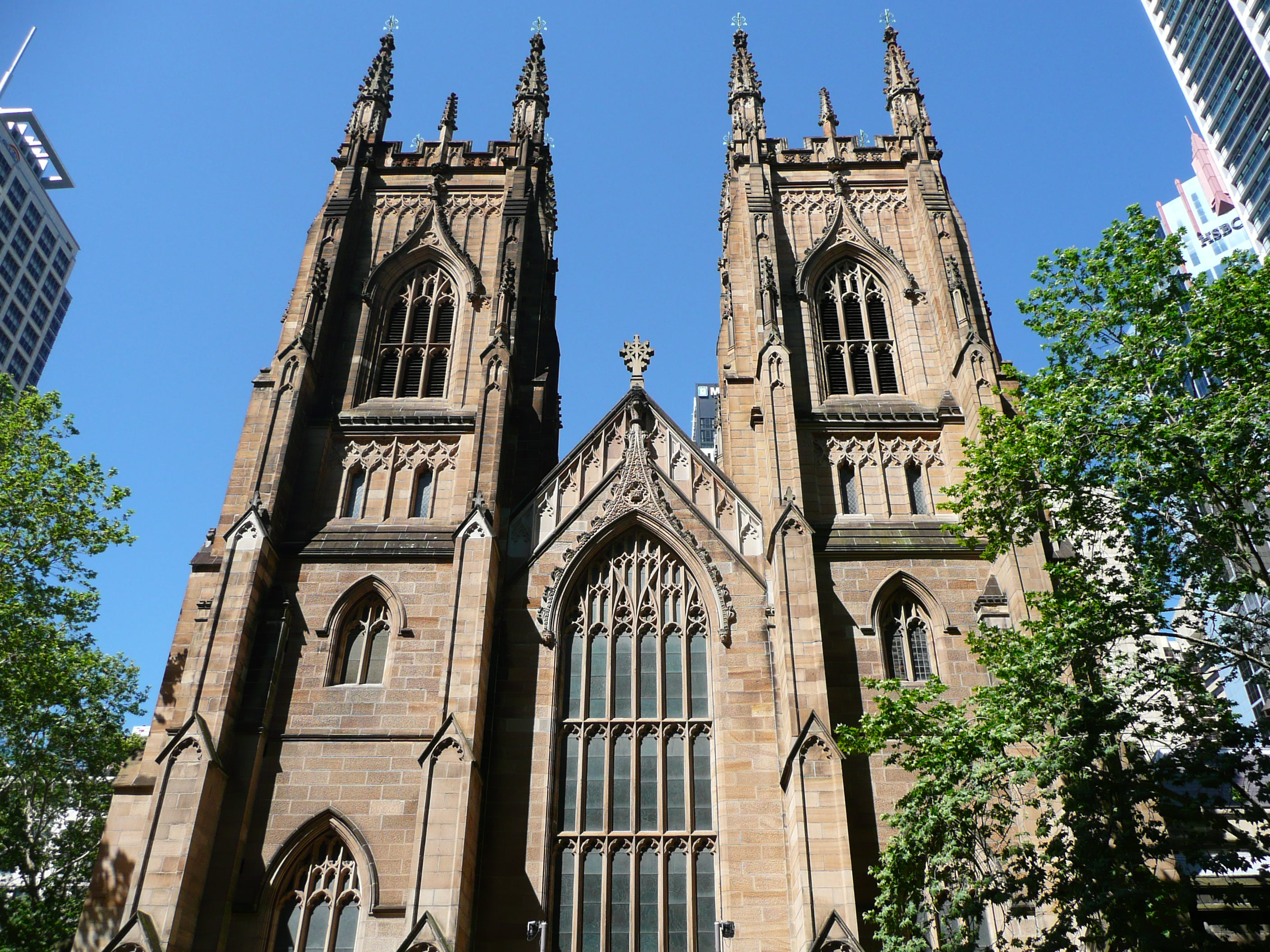
St Andrew's Cathedral, west side

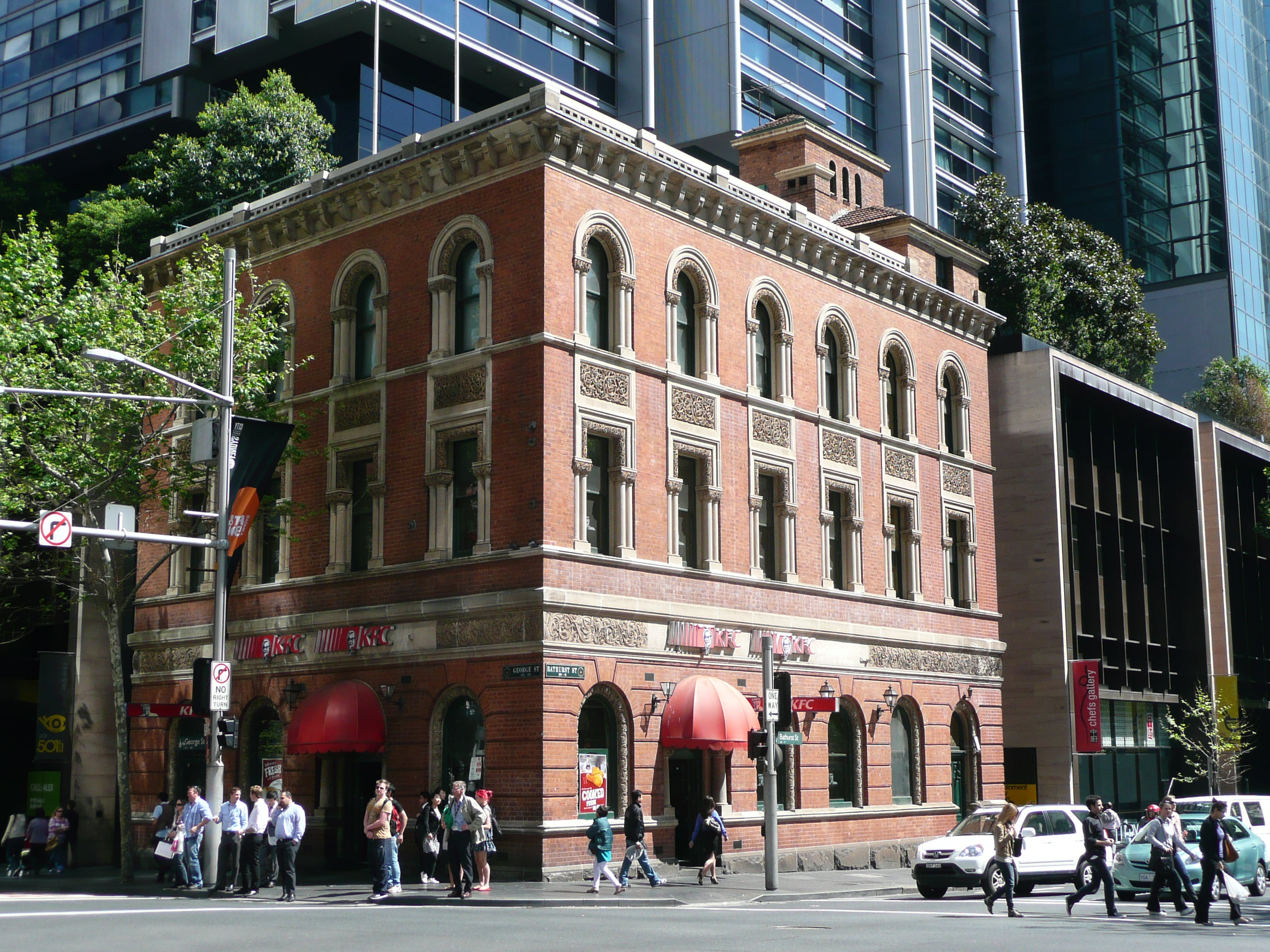
Former Bank of New South Wales

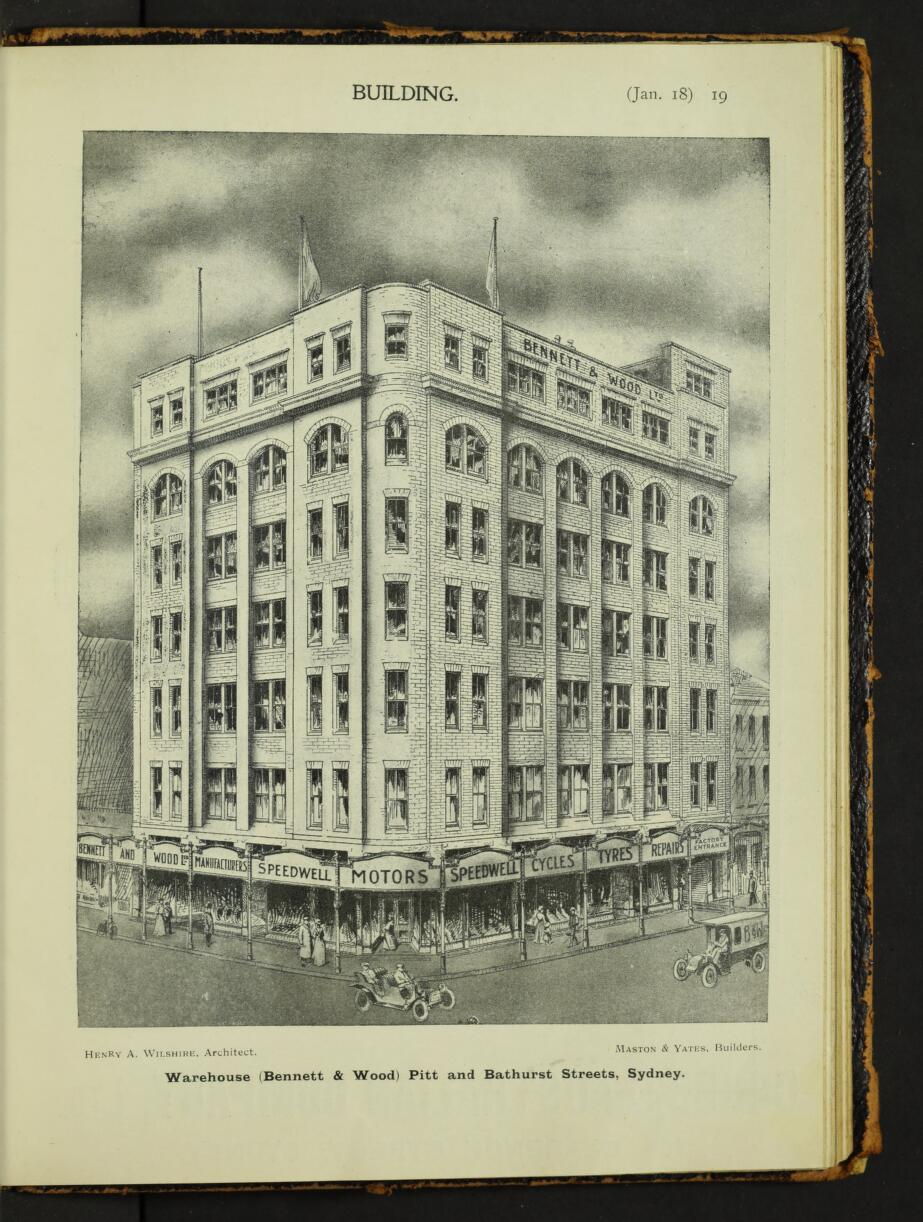
1907 warehouse -292 Pitt st cnr Bathurst st - now NAB branch

== See also ==
Media related to Bathurst Street, Sydney at Wikimedia Commons
