= Aneurysm (band) =

Italian metal band from Verona

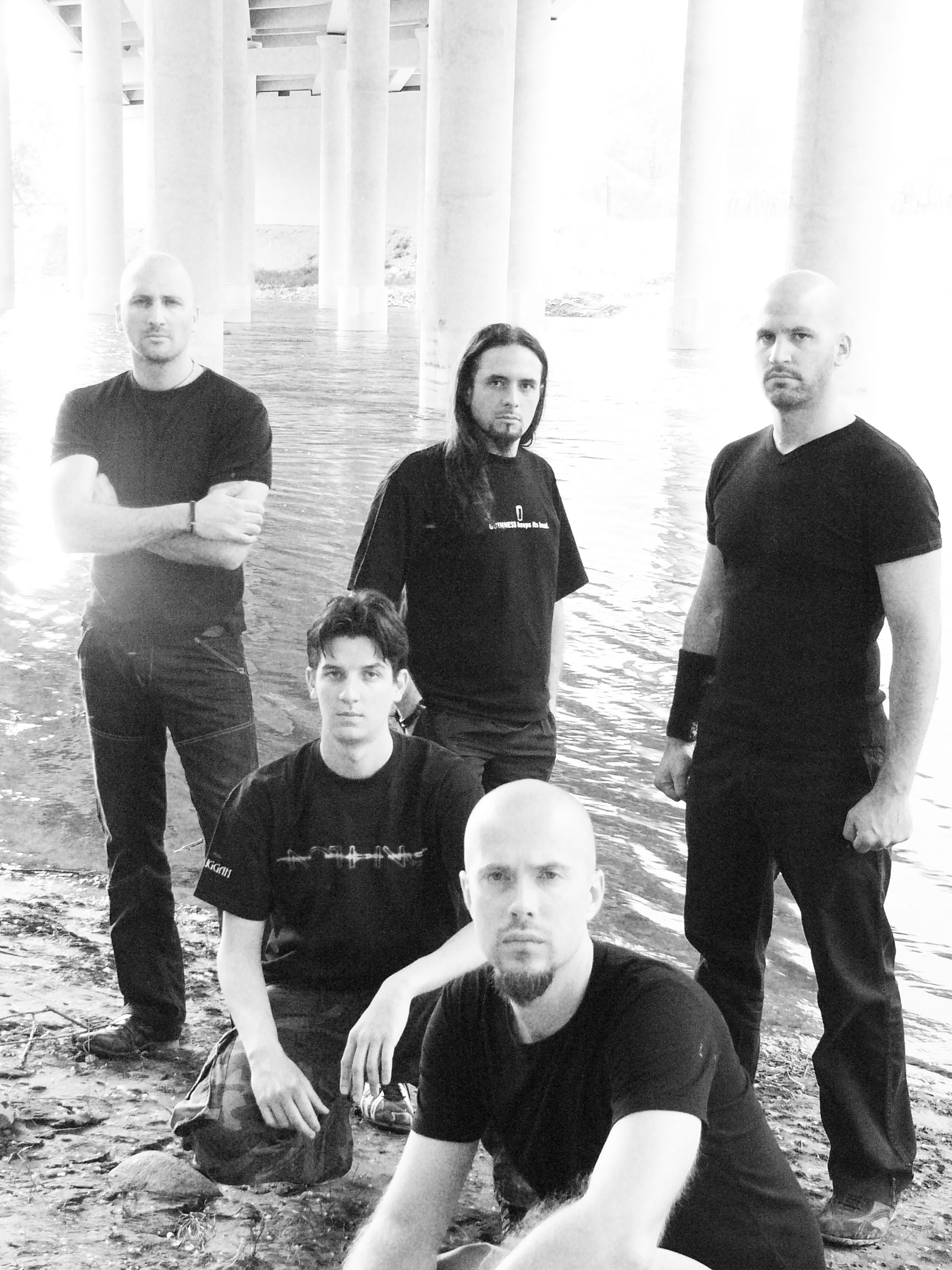

Background information
- Origin: Verona, Italy
- Genres: Industrial metal; Thrash metal
- Years active: 1994–2013
- Labels: Old Ones Records
- Past members: Gianmaria Carneri; Peter Calmasini; Ivano Dalla Brea; Jacopo Frapporti; Stefano Torregrossa; Enea Cipriani; Marco Piran; Mirko Zamperini
- Website: aneurysm.it at the Wayback Machine (archived 2008-06-24)

Aneurysm was an Italian industrial metal band, formed in 1994 in Verona. They have defined their genre as cyber metal.

== History and style ==
Influenced by 1980s thrash metal bands such as Metallica, Pantera and Fear Factory, Aneurysm combined thrash with progressive metal and characteristic vocals, in what they have described as cyber metal.

Seven years after the demo-tape Burst (1995), their first full-length album Aware (2002) was released to received positive reviews. In June 2005, Aneurysm began recording Shades, a concept album with Hansi Kürsch from Blind Guardian as a guest artist. In 2007 the album was released by Old Ones Records and was positively received by critics and the public.

== Members ==
=== Members at dissolution ===
- Gianmaria Carneri – Vocals, Guitar
- Peter Calmasini – Guitar
- Ivano Dalla Brea – Bass
- Jacopo Frapporti – Drums
- Stefano Torregrossa – Keyboards

=== Former members ===
- Mirko Zamperini – Bass (1994–2001)
- Enea Cipriani – Bass (2001–2003)
- Marco Piran – Drums (1994–2010)

== Discography ==
- Burst (1995, demo)
- Aware (2002)
- Shades (2007)
- Archaic Life Form (2011)
