= Livingston Hopkins =

American/Australian cartoonist (1846–1927)

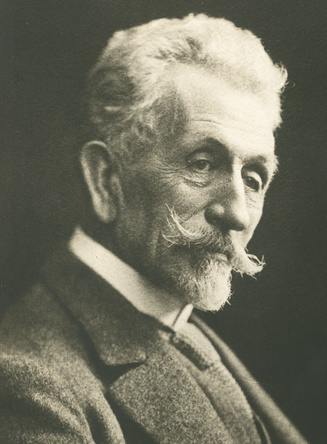
- Born: Livingston Yourtee Hopkins; 7 July 1846; Bellefontaine, Ohio, United States of America
- Died: 21 August 1927 (aged 81); Mosman, New South Wales, Australia
- Occupations: Cartoonist, illustrator, caricaturist, artist
- Writing career
- Pen name: Hop

Signature
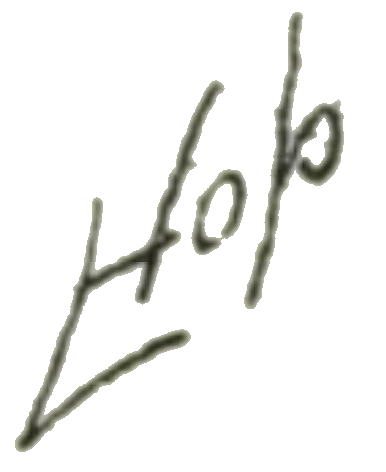

Livingston Yourtee ('Hop') Hopkins (7 July 1846 – 21 August 1927) was a prolific cartoonist and caricaturist with successive careers in both the United States and Australia. Born in the American mid-west state of Ohio, Hopkins worked as a freelance cartoonist and illustrator in New York from 1870 to 1882, during a period of expansion of illustrated newspapers and magazines in America. His work was published in a wide variety of periodicals and specialty publications. Hopkins' A Comic History of United States, which he wrote and illustrated, was published in 1876. By the early 1880s he had established a reputation as a talented cartoonist and illustrator.

In September 1882 Hopkins was visited in New York by William Traill, part-owner of The Bulletin, a recently established illustrated journal based in Sydney, Australia. Traill offered Hopkins a position as a cartoonist for The Bulletin, on contract for two years, which he accepted and in February 1883 relocated to Sydney with his family.

Hopkins remained in Australia and worked full-time for The Bulletin for over thirty years, eventually becoming a part-owner of the journal and having occasional cartoons published up until 1921. Hopkins became a major figure in Australian cartooning in the period leading up to the Federation of Australia. Known by the public as 'Hop', his satirical illustrations were a significant factor in the steadily growing popularity of The Bulletin during the 1880s and its influential position in Australian culture of the 1890s.

== Biography ==
=== Early life ===
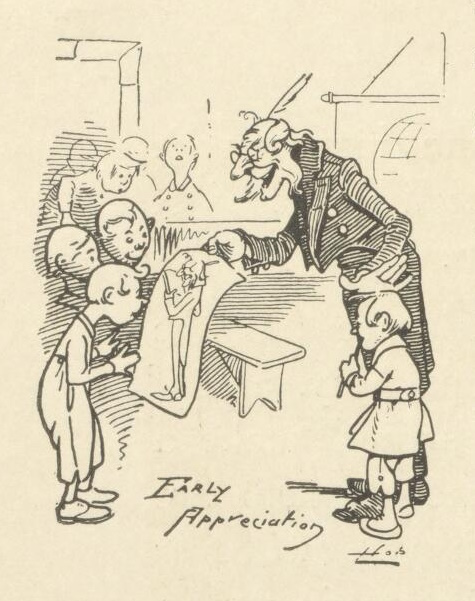
'Early Appreciation', referencing the artist's schooldays (from 'On the Hop', 1904).

Livingston Hopkins was born on 7 July 1846 in the United States of America, on a farm at Bellefontaine in Logan County, Ohio, the son of Daniel Hopkins and his wife Sarah (née Carter). The family, with Puritan roots, had migrated from the New England region to the Ohio frontier. Livingston was the thirteenth of fourteen children. His father died in 1849 when Livingston was aged three years, leaving his mother a widow with nine surviving children. In 1850 the family was living at Lake Township in Logan County. In July 1854 the widowed Sarah Hopkins married Silas McClish at Shelby in Ohio. In 1860 the family was living at Kalida in Putnam County.

Young Livingston had an early interest in drawing and was educated at schools at Bellafontaine, Kalida and Toledo until the age of fourteen. Hopkins fondly remembered an early schoolmaster named Mr. Gudgeon. When Livingston began to draw caricatures of the teacher, Gudgeon received the drawings with tolerant amusement and encouraged his pupil to preserve his artwork in a scrapbook. In about 1853, when he was aged seven years, Livingston was placed into the care of an older brother and his wife at Toledo (at the western end of Lake Erie), where he attended a much larger school. After leaving school in about 1860 Hopkins worked in a variety of positions, during which he continued to develop his artistic skills, producing sketches and illustrations for private circulation.

In May 1864 Hopkins, then aged seventeen, left a clerical position and enlisted in the 130th Ohio Volunteer Regiment to serve in the American Civil War.^{[A]} The regiment was one of the volunteer units raised for 100-day service in the Union Army. The short-term lightly trained troops were placed in rear areas to protect communication and supply points in order to free regular troops for Ulysses S. Grant’s push on the Confederate capital of Richmond, Virginia. Hopkins' unit was initially stationed at Washington, D.C. The artist later recalled an occasion when President Lincoln and his officers rode through the lines of the regimental encampment. After the Union attack on Richmond had been resisted by the Confederate forces and opposing trench-lines were established in the vicinity of Richmond and Petersburg, the Ohio volunteers were sent behind the frontline to protect a semaphore station used for transmitting official messages. During his military service Hopkins spent much of his time erecting pickets along the trench-lines near Petersburg and "relieving his boredom by drawing". The regiment's period of service ended in September 1864, after which Hopkins re-entered civilian life.

=== A cartoonist's career ===
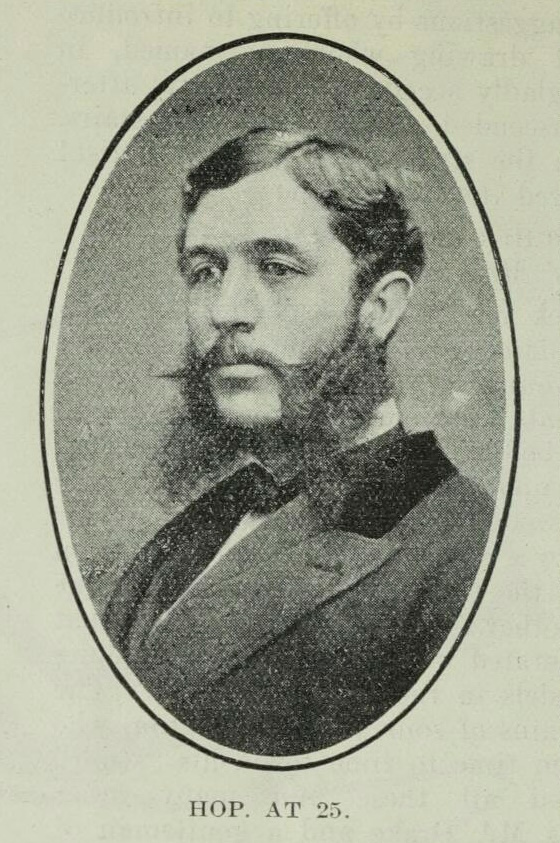
Photographic portrait of Livingston Hopkins in about 1871.

After his Civil War service, Hopkins briefly worked as a railroad messenger. In Toledo Hopkins' drawing ability came to the attention of Dr. Miller, co-proprietor of the Toledo Blade newspaper. Miller's partner David Ross Locke, using the pseudonym 'Rev. Petroleum V. Nasby', had been writing a series of 'letters' that were published in the Blade and in separate volumes during and after the Civil War, satirising the slave-holding Confederate South and its Northern sympathisers. Hopkins received a job offer to provide illustrations for some of Locke's 'Nasby' publications. At about the same time, however, the aspiring cartoonist was offered a position with the Champaign Union newspaper in Champaign, Illinois. He accepted the position and moved to Champaign where he was employed as the "'local' editor and general utility man". In addition to his job at the Champaign Union, Hopkins also managed, while working after hours, to produce illustrations for the 'Nasby' books. His first drawing in print was published in the Champaign Union, with Hopkins also producing the woodcut block used to reproduce the illustration. The artist later wrote of his Champaign beginnings: "So long as I am able to remember anything, I shall never forget the happy days spent in the genial atmosphere of that little newspaper office, nor the valuable experience I gained there".

In 1870, when Dr. Miller (of the Toledo Blade) was in New York, he visited the offices of Scribner and Co. who were planning a new monthly illustrated magazine in competition with Harper's Monthly. Miller recommended Hopkins "as one who would suit them exactly to keep up a department of humorous sketches of one or two pages per month", in addition to other work as required. In early October 1870 Hopkins received a letter from Josiah G. Holland, a partner at Scribner and Co. and editor of the magazine then in the process of being established. Holland wrote enquiring about Hopkins' employment situation and offering the possibility of a job at the magazine. After an exchange of correspondence Hopkins was offered a position at the new magazine, to be called Scribner's Monthly, which he promptly accepted. When Hopkins arrived at the offices of Scribner and Co. in New York, Holland was absent and the young cartoonist was received by the business partner, Roswell Smith, "with somewhat pompous and... rather puzzled cordiality". Hopkins was then given over to Alexander Drake, in charge of the Art department. After examining Hopkins' portfolio of drawings, Drake told him "your drawings show much natural talent and considerable humour", adding "I have no doubt that with two or three years study under good instruction you will produce work that will be up to the required standard". Hopkins was then placed in a clerical position in the business department, on a salary of twelve dollars a week, and arrangements were made for him to study under a drawing teacher for two nights a week, at his own expense.

The drawing teacher was a German artist named Augustus Will, who taught illustration according to the 'Dupuis method', with its emphasis on mastering the principles of perspective.^{[B]} After about five months working as a clerk, Hopkins despaired of the meagre pay and lesser prestige than he had enjoyed in Illinois. His examination of cartoons by other artists in the illustrated journals had convinced him that he was already capable of matching what was being commercially published. After submitting a batch of his best cartoons to various publications such as Harper's Monthly and Frank Leslie's Illustrated Newspaper, nearly all were accepted at good prices. Hopkins also applied himself to mastering the process of engraving the wood-blocks used to print his artwork, thus being paid for both the illustration and its means of reproduction. Encouraged by his successes as a freelance artist, Hopkins resigned from the clerical position with Scribner's and discontinued his attendance at Augustus Will's drawing school. He set up his own studio at 116 Nassau Street, Manhattan, "in a part of the city that was within easy walking distance of a ready market for comic goods". His studio had a sign on the door: "Livingston Hopkins, Designer on Wood".

=== Freelance ===
During Hopkins' first few years working as a freelance cartoonist and illustrator, payments were often scanty and erratic, but there was a steady fiscal improvement as the years progressed. During the post-Civil War years the number of illustrated periodicals expanded rapidly, partly due to technological innovations relating to typesetting, printing and image reproduction. During this period the woodblock process of image reproduction was replaced by the introduction and development of commercial photo-engraving techniques, resulting in a more faithful representation of the original artwork. Many of the new periodicals addressed particular market niches, attracting advertising that kept the magazine's price low. The growth of railroads, public libraries and the postal service led to increased nation-wide access to the publications. Hopkins took full advantage of the expanding magazine market and established personal contacts in the New York publishing companies. His cartoons and illustrations began to be published in older established periodicals such as the Harper's stable of magazines (including Harper's Weekly and Harper's New Monthly). His work was also published in Wild Oats, a humour magazine established in 1870, as well as specialty publications from Wild Oats such as Life of Horace Greeley. An early commission that Hopkins received was to provide sixteen chapter illustrations for Cervantes' The Adventures of the Ingenious Gentleman Don Quixote de la Mancha (translated by Peter Motteux), published in 1870 by Hurst and Co. of New York.

Hopkins was commissioned through the publisher George Carleton to illustrate Josh Billings' Farmer's Allminax, first published in 1870. The artist and the humourist Henry Shaw (who wrote under the name 'Josh Billings') became friends and Hopkins continued to illustrate the popular annual Allminax until its final edition in 1879.^{[C]} The Farmer's Allminax series were compiled in Shaw's Old Probability, published in 1879.

In October 1872 the first daily illustrated newspaper, The Daily Graphic, was commenced in New York City, employing a new photo-lithograhic process for its illustrations. Hopkins was invited to join the staff of the new journal, but declined the offer as, in his own words, he was "becoming more and more confirmed in the happy-go-lucky habits of a free lance". He eventually entered into an agreement with the newspaper management to contribute to The Daily Graphic "on a space-rate basis". His illustrations and cartoons were also published in St. Nicholas (Scribner's magazine for children), established in 1873, as well as the satirical Puck magazine, established in 1876, and its competitor, Judge that began in 1881.

The work of a freelance cartoonist and illustrator appealed to Hopkins: "You became your own master, and, keeping no 'time-book', you may choose your own hours for working; and once you have struck your gait, you may confine your efforts to the class of subjects most in harmony with your own tastes and limitations". Hopkins began to use his characteristic signature, 'Hop', during his period as a freelance illustrator in New York City. As he later explained: "My earlier works were signed with my full name: but ere long I fell into the habit of shortening my signature to proportions more in keeping with my growing modesty; and so adopted, and have retained, the name and style of 'Hop' ever since".

Hopkins married Harriet Augusta Commager on 9 June 1875 in Toledo. The couple had three children – Hattie, Daniel and Marion – born in New York between 1876 and 1882. A fourth child died as an infant.

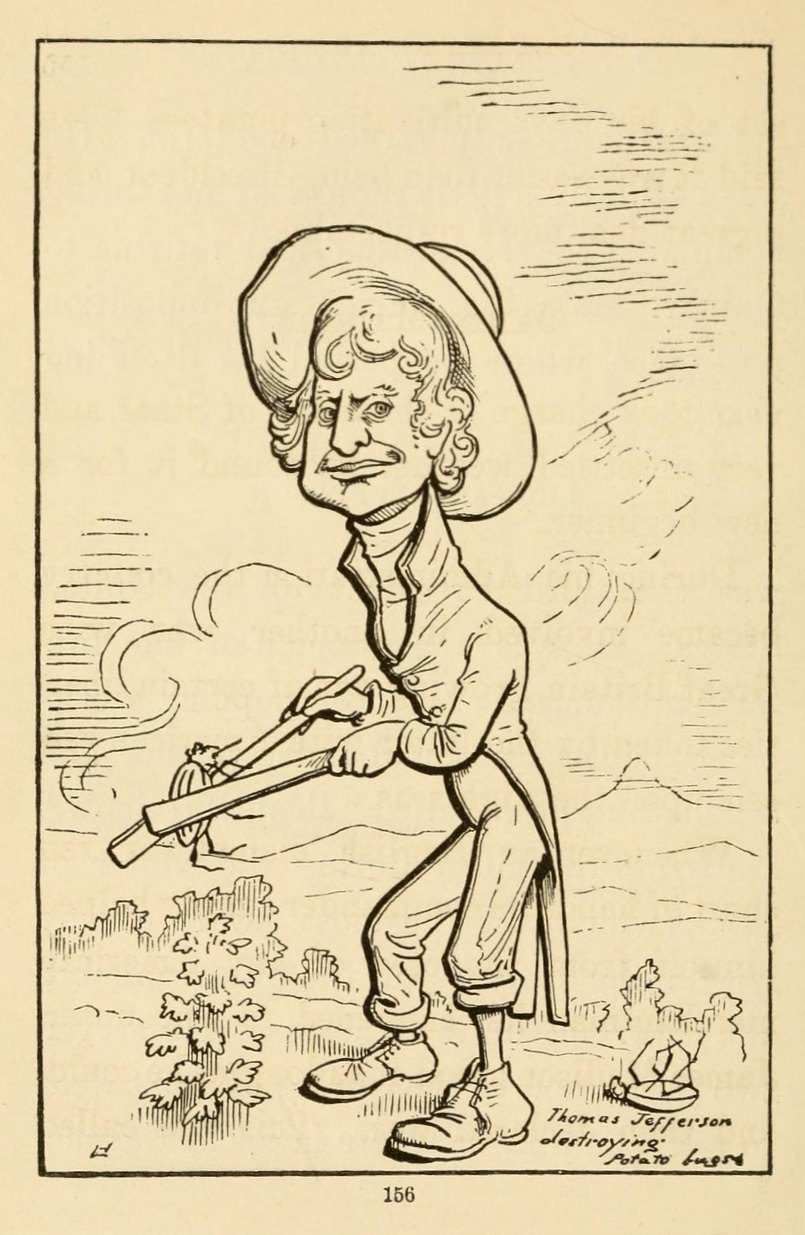
'Thomas Jefferson Destroying Potato Bugs', page 156 of A Comic History of United States (1876).

In November 1872 a sequence of cartoons by Hopkins titled 'Big Scalper: A Legend of the Noble Red Man', with rhyming captions, was published in Harper's New Monthly magazine. In 1875 the Daily Graphic published a booklet titled Bessie Turner's Testimony based on the testimony of Bessie Turner in the trial for adultery of Rev. Henry Ward Beecher in the Brooklyn City Court during the first six months of 1875. The booklet featured a fold-out strip of comic illustrations by Hopkins. On 11 September 1875 a cartoon sequence by Hopkins, titled 'Professor Tigwissel's Burglar Alarm', was published in The Daily Graphic, considered to be an early example of a comic strip in an American newspaper.

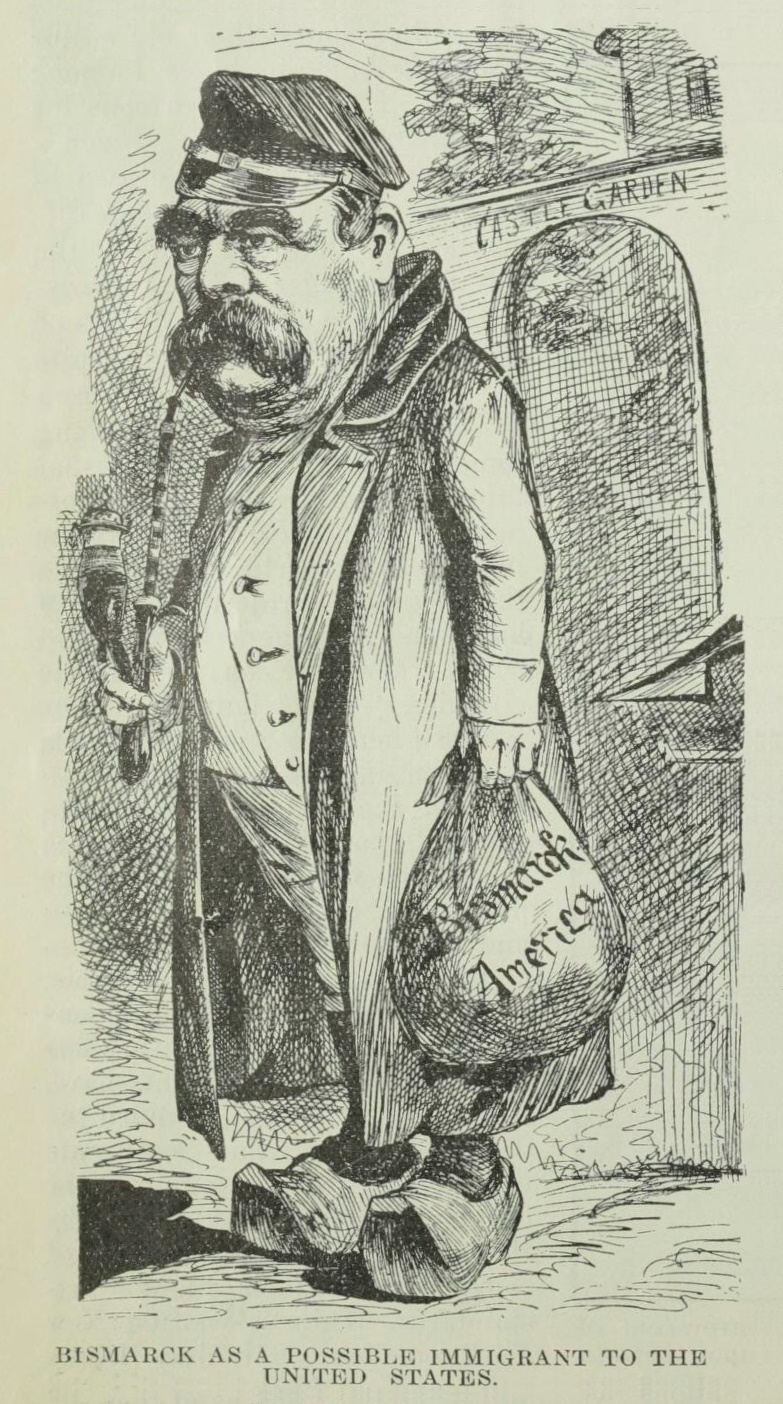
'Bismarck as a Possible Immigrant to the United States', originally published in The Daily Graphic (1882).

In the lead-up to the centennial celebrations of American independence Hopkins suggested to the publisher George Carleton that a "book of facetiae bearing upon American history, composed and illustrated by my modest self and published by him, would make both our fortunes". Carleton agreed to the idea and a deal was struck, with Hopkins to receive fifteen percent of the gross sales (with the first thousand copies to be exempt from the author's royalty). Livingston Hopkins' A Comic History of United States was published by G. W. Carleton and Co. of New York in 1876, released "in good time" for the Centennial International Exhibition held in Philadelphia. Press copies of the book were sent out for review, but "there were few favourable notices". Some reviewers attacked the book as being "devoid of respect for national sentiments". A review of the book in the Portland Daily Press found much of the text lacking in comic effect: "Occasionally a page is enlivened by a bit of humour, but for the most part the volume is as dreary and not half as instructive as a patent office report". However, the reviewer was more impressed by the illustrations, finding them "decidedly more entertaining than those which appear in the government volume, and some of them are really mirth provoking". Sales of the book was so poor that Hopkins received no author's royalty from the publisher. In 1880 the book was reissued by the American Book Exchange. A year or two after it was originally published a British publisher, Cassell, Petter, Galpin and Co., through their branch office in New York, offered to republish A Comic History of United States. The book was released at a reduced price and "had a steady sale", such that Hopkins was occasionally sent a royalty check "for several years" after coming to Australia.

Hopkins had been a regular contributor to the St. Nicholas children's magazine since its inception in 1873. A serial from St. Nicholas, 'The Countess and the Cat’ by Thomas Bailey Aldrich, which Hopkins illustrated with silhouette drawings, was published in book form in 1878 as The Story of a Cat by Houghton, Osgood & Co. Hopkins also contributed illustrations published in books for children such as The Children's Funny Book (1879) and Child Lore (1882), both published by D. Lothrop & Co. Hopkins' artwork appeared in Hawk-eyes, "a volume of collected humorous stories and essays" by Robert Burdette, published in 1879 by George Carleton. He also illustrated Three Wise Old Couples, written by Elizabeth T. Corbett and published by Cassell, Petter, Galpin & Co. in 1881. Hopkins also received commissions to provide illustrations for editions of classic literature. In addition to his work for Don Quixote in 1870, he also illustrated editions of Gulliver's Travels, Baron Munchausen, and Washington Irving's Knickerbocker's History of New York.

=== A job offer ===
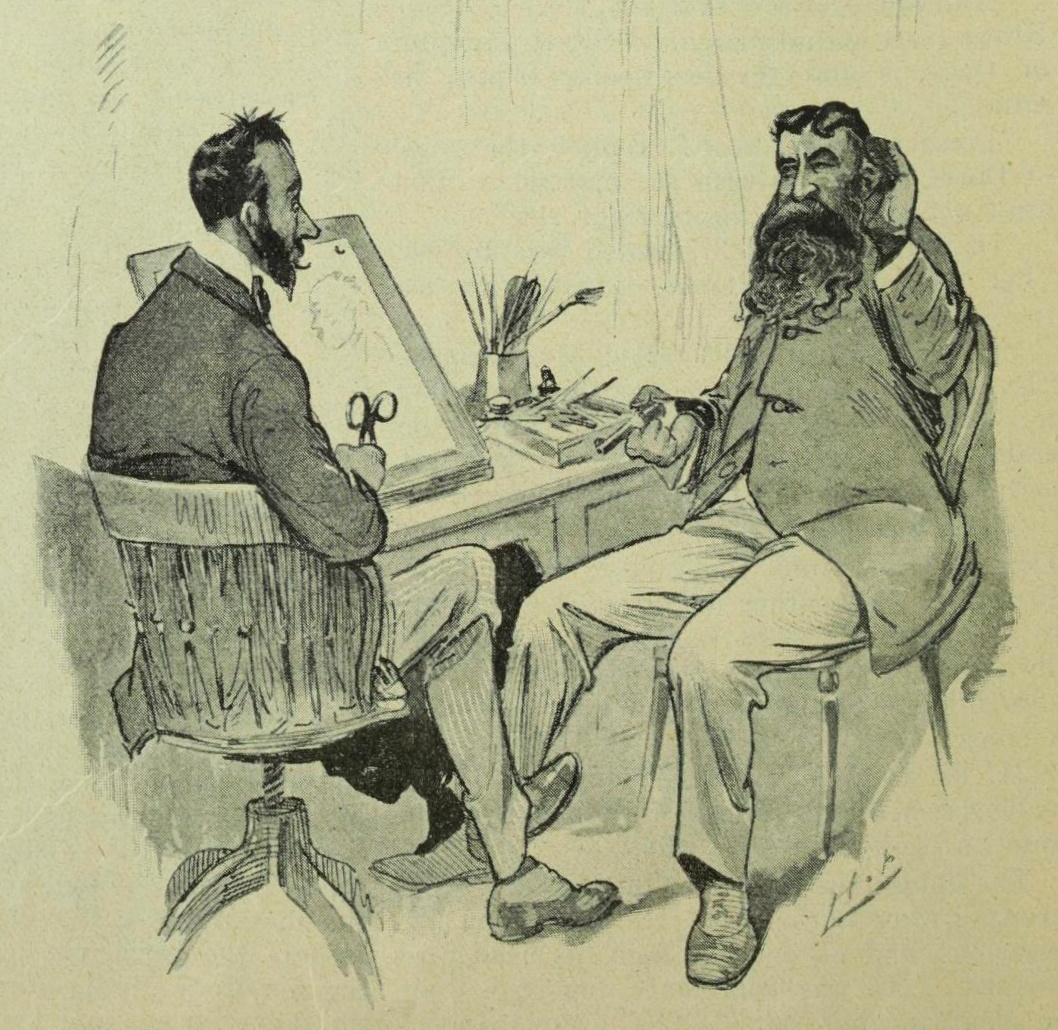
Hopkins' depiction of his meeting with William H. Traill of The Bulletin, at the artist's studio in New York in November 1882.

In September 1882 William Traill, the managing-director and principal shareholder of the Australian illustrated journal The Bulletin, arrived at San Francisco by steamer from Sydney. He had travelled to America on a mission to secure the services for his magazine of "a humorous artist of the first rank". Traill and his partner, J. F. Archibald, were admirers of the cartoons and illustrations featured in American illustrated journals. In Traill's words: "I determined to make a desperate effort to engage and bring to Australia some one of the many clever comic draughtsmen whose work embellished various Yankee papers which we received regularly". After an unsuccessful attempt to entice George Keller of San Francisco's The Wasp magazine, Traill crossed the continent by rail to New York City.

In New York Traill interviewed artists whose work he admired, including James Wales of Judge and Frederick Opper of Puck. Traill also had an appreciation for Livingston Hopkins' illustrations, whose work he had seen in St. Nicholas and The Daily Graphic. In November 1882 he went to see Hopkins at his studio in Nassau Street. After ascending the three flights of stairs Traill entered the studio and, "without further preliminaries", said to the artist: "Well, Mr. Hopkins, I've come to take you to Australia!". After formally introducing himself, Traill described life in Australia, gave an account of the brief history of The Bulletin and explained that part of his plans for improving the magazine "was the engagement of a cartoonist". His offer to Hopkins was all expenses travel from New York to Sydney via San Francisco and a contractual engagement for two years at £400 per annum. Hopkins promised to consider the matter and give his decision within a few days.

At their next meeting Hopkins explained that he would need to consult his wife, who was visiting relatives in Toledo. He wrote to Harriet explaining the situation and requested that she reply by wire. However, Traill was unable to wait for an answer as it had become necessary for him to travel to San Francisco to catch the steamer for Australia. Before departing he left a preliminary agreement to be signed and travel expenses for Hopkins and his family with a business acquaintance in New York. Traill returned to Australia aboard the R.M.S. Zealandia, arriving at Sydney on 15 December 1882. When Hopkins received the telegram from his wife, it read: "Accept Australia". The artist then signed the agreement and began preparations for travel to Australia. Hopkins' final commission before leaving the United States was the illustrations for The Model Primer, a compilation of prose for children by Eugene Field and published by Frederick Tredwell of Brooklyn.

=== Australia ===
In late December 1882 Hopkins travelled with his family by train from New York to San Francisco. Hopkins and his wife and daughters departed from San Francisco on 16 January 1883 aboard the mail-steamer R.M.S. Australia and arrived at Sydney on 9 February. The family found temporary accommodation near the top of William Street in Sydney and Hopkins was provided with a studio on Bond Street, near Circular Quay. On 12 February 1883 he signed a three-year contract with The Bulletin.

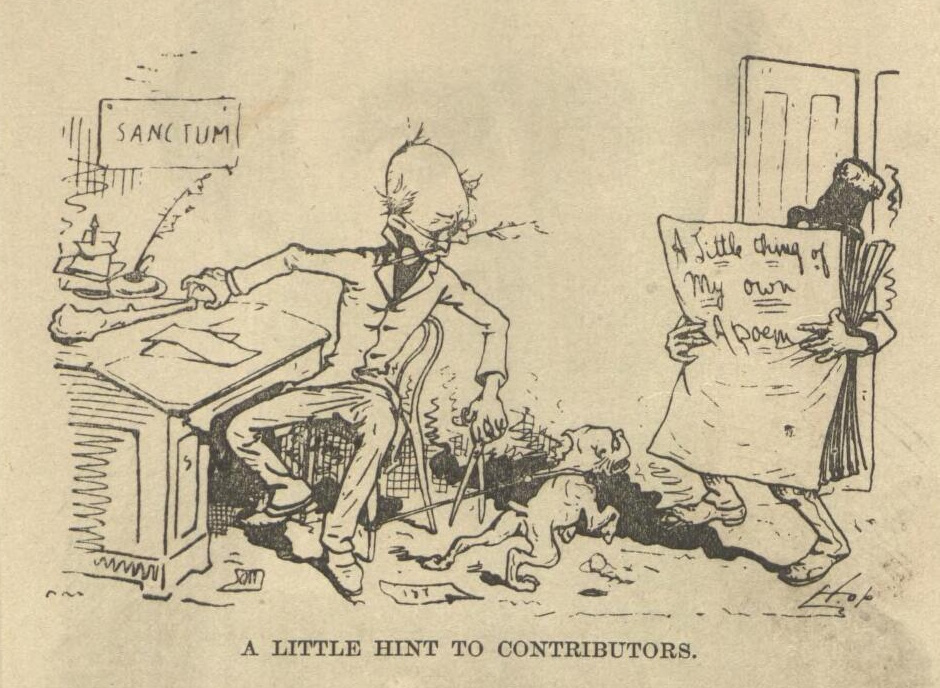
'A Little Hint to Contributors', published in The Bulletin, 19 May 1883.

Livingston Hopkins' appointment to The Bulletin staff was announced in the 12 May 1883 issue in conjunction with publicising the "new series" of the magazine to be inaugurated in the issue of the following week. The revamped magazine was to consist of 24 pages, "printed throughout from entirely new type, and embellished by the addition of numerous unique illustrations". Hopkins was described as "a gentleman who, as a genuine humourist with the pencil, is not excelled, and perhaps not equalled by any living artist". The artist's services had been secured, as was described, "at an expense unprecedented by the oldest and most wealthy newspaper proprietories[sic] on this side of the equator". Illustrations by Hopkins featured prominently in the first issue of the "New Series" Bulletin on 19 May 1883, including two full-page cartoons.

In addition to engaging a cartoonist during his trip to America, Traill had also sought to introduce modern methods of image reproduction at The Bulletin. While he was in San Francisco he had engaged "a competent young man to do the mechanical work of reproducing drawings by means of zincography". In New York Traill had acquired some rudimentary knowledge of the intricate process of producing a photo-engraved plate and had obtained manuals on the art. However, after many attempts at The Bulletin to master the process, with unsatisfactory results, Hopkins suggested to Traill that expert photo-engraving technicians be sought. Two men were engaged from America, the etcher Tom Gleason and a plate-maker from New York, Charles Buckland Shugg. Their arrival "put an end to all this fumbling in the dark" and heralded a new era in the reproduction of cartoons and illustrations in Australian newspapers and magazines.

=== 'Hop' of The Bulletin ===
An early attempt by Hopkins of caricaturing a local politician was a June 1883 cartoon titled 'Wanted, a Backbone' featuring the premier of New South Wales, Alexander Stuart, lacking a backbone and kept upright by a group of supporters. His political caricatures soon became a consistent feature of his work for The Bulletin. The following issue included a cartoon by Hopkins featuring caricatures of the colonial treasurer, James Watson, and prominent Sydney businessman Albert Elkington, who had recently been on opposite sides of a legal dispute in the Equity Court. In 1884, in addition to his routine work for The Bulletin, Hopkins provided illustrations for The Parsonage Girl: A Tale in Five Chapters, a short novel by Thomas Moser (published by Gibbs, Shallard and Co. of Sydney). Hopkins remained at the Bond Street studio until about August 1885, after which he relocated to a room on the first floor of the Bulletin offices in Pitt Street.

Hopkins became a prominent member of Sydney's Athenaeum Club, as was the Bulletin editor J. F. Archibald. The club had been formed in 1881 and was the hub of the bohemian literary and artistic life of Sydney for several decades, where "politicians, journalists, actors, artists, and others of the discontented classes foregathered". Other members included the politicians Edmund Barton and Jack Want and the actor and theatre manager George Rignold.

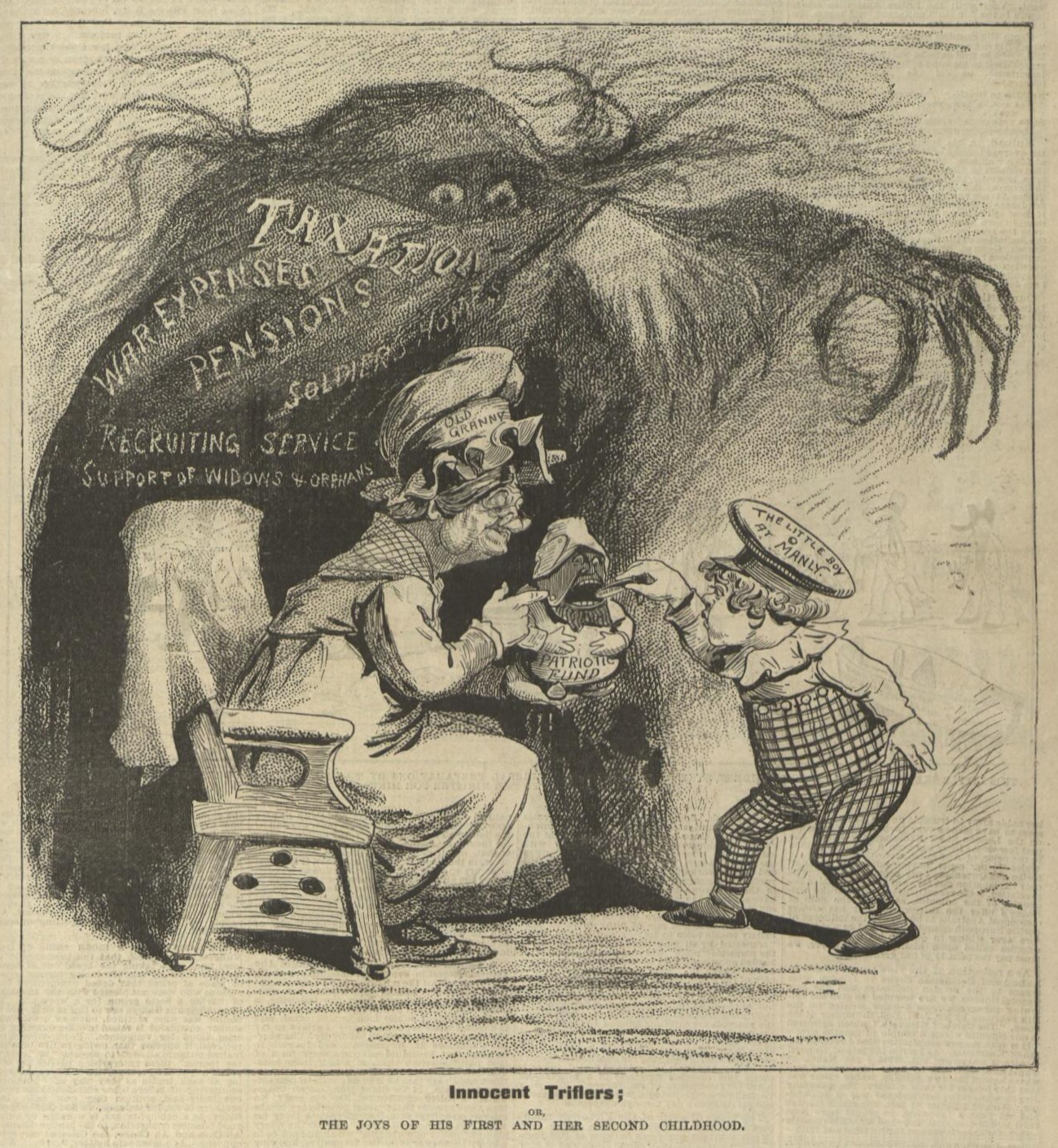
'Innocent Triflers', published in The Bulletin, 4 April 1885.

In 1885 Hopkins' creative imagination produced an enduring image that evolved to symbolise and personify the colony of New South Wales and in later years, a figurative representation of the Australian nation as a whole. In February 1885 William Bede Dalley, as acting-premier of the colony, offered to send a detachment of New South Wales troops to the Sudan to support British forces in the suppression of the Mahdist uprising. After the British acceptance of Dalley's offer, a wave of patriotic enthusiasm became evident and a fund was established to receive public contributions, both monetary and in kind, in support of the expedition. On 4 March 1885, the day after the troops departed from Sydney, 10-year-old Ernest Lawrence wrote to Dalley enclosing a sum of £25 from his savings (plus a contribution from his father) "with my best wishes from a little boy at Manly". The young boy's contribution received wide publicity, with his letter and Dalley's reply being published in the Sydney Morning Herald and other newspapers. A cartoon by Hop published in The Bulletin of 4 April 1885, 'Innocent Triflers; or, the Joys of His First and Her Second Childhood', features a figure labelled "The Little Boy at Manly". The boy is depicted depositing a coin into a money-box labelled "Patriotic Fund" held by "Old Granny". Behind the old woman and boy looms a spectral figure with labels including "Taxation", "War Expenses", "Pensions" and "Soldiers' Homes". Hopkins illustrated the 'Little Boy at Manly' as a young lad in early-Victorian costume in the style of English storybook schoolboys, wearing high-waisted pantaloons, a shirt with a frilled collar and a flat peaked cap. In the following decades the 'Little Boy from Manly' became a widely known and routinely used symbol of Australia's emerging nationhood in The Bulletin, featured in illustrations by Hopkins as well as other of the magazine's artists.

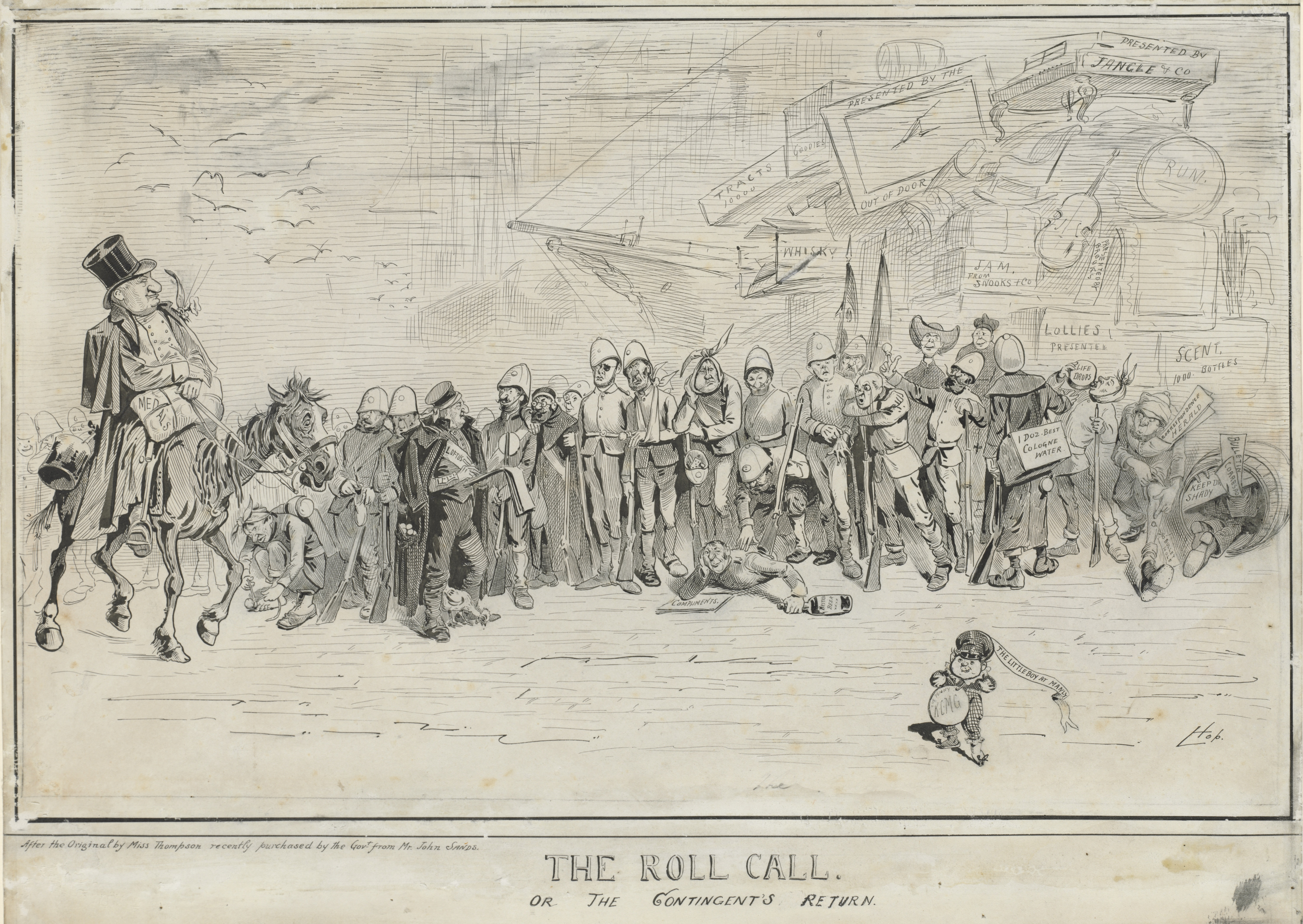
Hopkins' original artwork for 'The Roll-Call. – The Return of the N.S.W. Contingent' (June 1885).

One of Hopkins' most celebrated and successful illustrations for The Bulletin was 'The Roll-Call. – The Return of the N.S.W. Contingent' which was included as a supplement to the issue of 20 June 1885 and as a full-page illustration the following week. Hopkins' drawing was inspired by two contemporary events, the return of the New South Wales Contingent who had served with British forces as part of the Suakin Expedition in the Sudan and the purchase by the National Art Gallery of New South Wales of a copy of The Roll Call, Elizabeth Thompson's revered Crimean War painting. The original work was an oil-on-canvas painting by Miss Thompson, completed in 1874 and depicting a roll call of soldiers from the Grenadier Guards during the Crimean War. The celebrated painting was exhibited at the Royal Academy and purchased for the Royal Collection by Queen Victoria. A Sydney art-dealer, John Sands, purchased "a replica" of The Roll Call, apparently painted by Thompson herself (by an arrangement contingent on the sale of the original). Sands exhibited the copied painting at his George Street gallery in May 1885. The art-dealer offered to sell the painting to the trustees of the National Art Gallery and on 13 June 1885 it was reported that the sale had gone through. The official reception for the New South Wales Contingent was held on 23 June 1885, greeted by "thousands of people" at Circular Quay including the colonial governor Lord Augustus Loftus.

Hopkins' parodic illustration of the return of the contingent, depicting William Bede Dalley on horseback reviewing the troops on the dock, was based on the composition of Thompson's painting. Hopkins' drawing satirises the "futility of the expedition", incorporating numerous details intended to "deflate the heroism of the cause". A drunken soldier falls from the line as Governor Loftus, as Dalley's adjutant (and a known poultry fancier), calls the roll with eggs in his pocket and a hen between his feet. Injuries to the troops include a bandaged toe and finger, while the Herald correspondent points to a bullet hole in his leg. In the background the transport vessel is laden with public contributions, including a grand piano and a cello, a barrel of rum and crates of whiskey, jam, lollies and scent. In the foreground a large K.C.M.G. medal hangs from the neck of the Little Boy at Manly (personifying the colony of New South Wales).

In October 1885 Traill travelled to England, with the purpose once again of engaging a talented cartoonist for The Bulletin. He returned to Sydney with a contract for the services of the twenty-one year-old Phil May, who had been contributing illustrations to the St. Stephen’s Review magazine. May and his wife arrived in Sydney early in 1886. Soon after May's arrival, he and Hopkins decided to "engage chambers together". They found two adjoining rooms in Jamieson Street, near the Bulletin office. Even though May later worked from a studio in his apartment, the two artists developed a close working relationship for the three years that May remained in Australia. Hopkins later recalled that "Phil May and I got on famously as comrades".^{[D]} May returned to England in October 1888 after his contract with The Bulletin had expired. The combined pictorial talents of Hopkins and May was an important factor in the growing popularity, influence and prosperity of The Bulletin during the late 1880s. Their popular and skilfully drawn cartoons and caricatures, enhanced by steadily improved methods of reproduction, attracted other artists to the magazine.

Livingston and Harriet Hopkins had three more children – two daughters, Amy and Dorothy, and a son named Almon – born in Sydney between 1887 and 1890.

In about mid-1889 Hopkins purchased 'Fernham', a two-storey residence in Raglan Street, Mosman, where he lived with his family until his death in 1927. The house had been advertised for sale in March 1889, described as being constructed of painted brick "on stone foundation", with a verandah front and side, eight bedrooms, a kitchen, bathroom, pantry and a weatherboard washhouse. Hopkins was a musician "of no mean order", known as an amateur cellist, and built musical instruments as a hobby.

Hopkins taught etching at both his Jamieson Street studio and his home at Mosman (where his press and plates were kept). His students included accomplished artists such as Julian Ashton, Tom Roberts, B. E. Minns and Arthur Streeton. Hopkins has been described as "an imaginative illustrator who practised fine art on the side". He started an artists' camp with Julian Ashton on rented land in the suburb of Balmoral at Edwards Beach (north of Balmoral Beach). Artists who painted at the camp included Arthur Streeton, Tom Roberts, Percy Spence, Albert Fullwood and Alfred Daplyn. In 1893 the camp was visited by Robert Louis Stevenson.

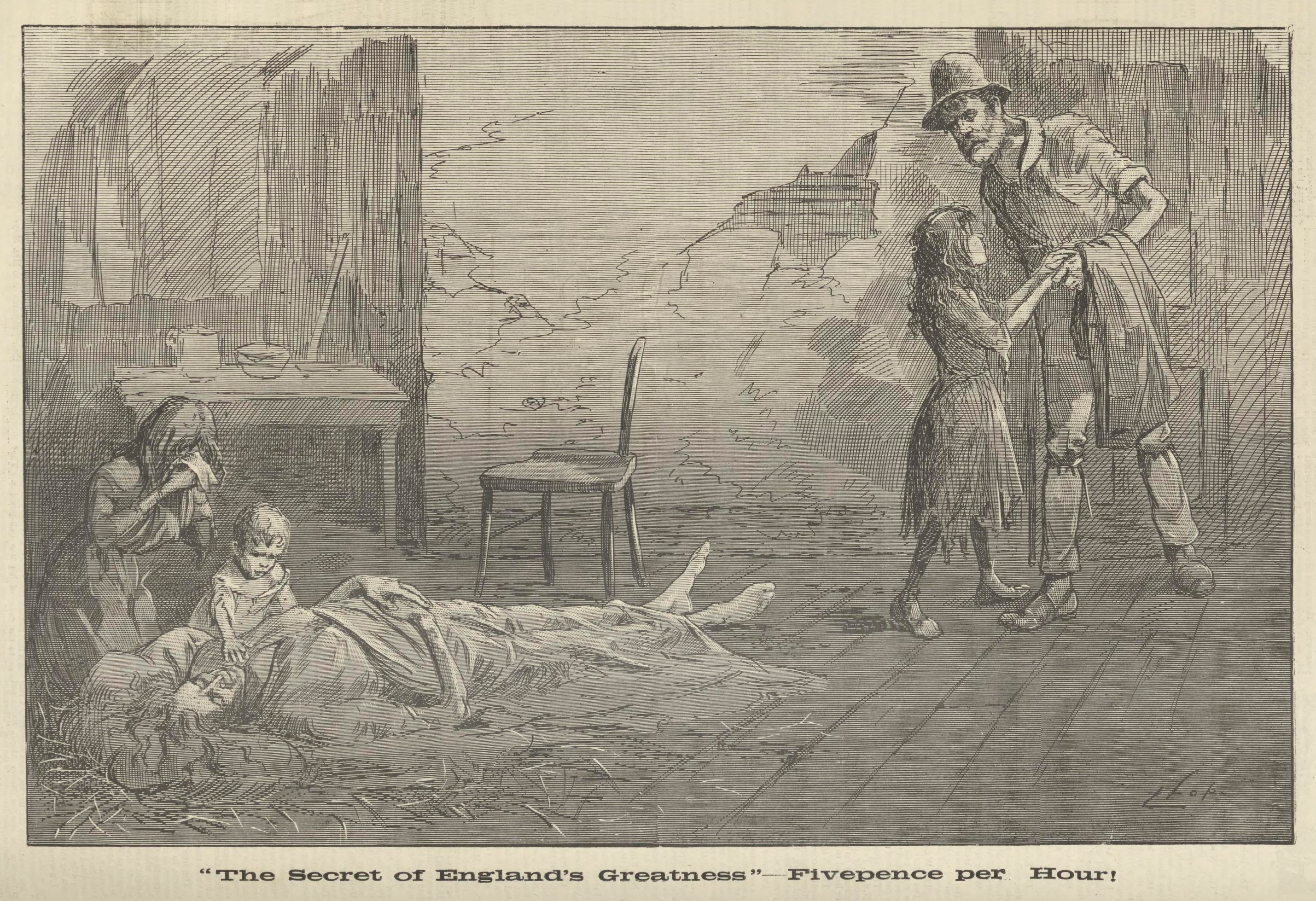
'"The Secret of England's Greatness" – Fivepence per Hour!', published in The Bulletin, 7 September 1889.

Hopkins had a fertile graphic imagination and a talent for creating durable symbols. His innovations included George Reid's 'dry dog' (representing free trade) and the 'Social Gimlet Society', the reforming 'social purity' squad ('wowsers'). Although much of Hopkins' work was that of a satirical commentator, he had the capacity to be a serious and forthright propagandist as well. An illustration published in September 1889, '"The Secret of England's Greatness" – Fivepence per Hour!', "passionately urges the preservation of Australian working-class conditions, then the world's best". The drawing, on lined scraper-board, shows a haggard working man arriving home to find the body of his starved wife on the floor, surrounded by her distraught children, as the eldest girl runs to her father. Hopkins' drawings most often satirised politicians, but he was equally capable of eliciting sympathy when the need arose. A cover cartoon for the Bulletin's issue of 29 July 1899 shows a destitute George Reid, then premier of New South Wales, with spectral figures of past politicians in the background. His drawing complemented a leading article on the following page supporting an increase in salaries for Australian politicians.

Hopkins' wife Harriet died on 30 July 1895 at their home in Mosman, aged 46. After the death of their mother Hopkins' daughters ran the household at 'Fernham'.

Hopkins enjoyed an enduring popularity with readers of The Bulletin. The historian and graphic artist, Marguerite Mahood, wrote that Hop's "irreverent, racy satire suited the colonial outlook", adding: "He had an advertiser's flair for phrase and slogan, an ear for the conversation of the man in the street, and an imagination that could translate it into graphic images". Hopkins also had a keen journalistic sense, habitually keeping notebooks "on the picturesque possibilities of the day's news".

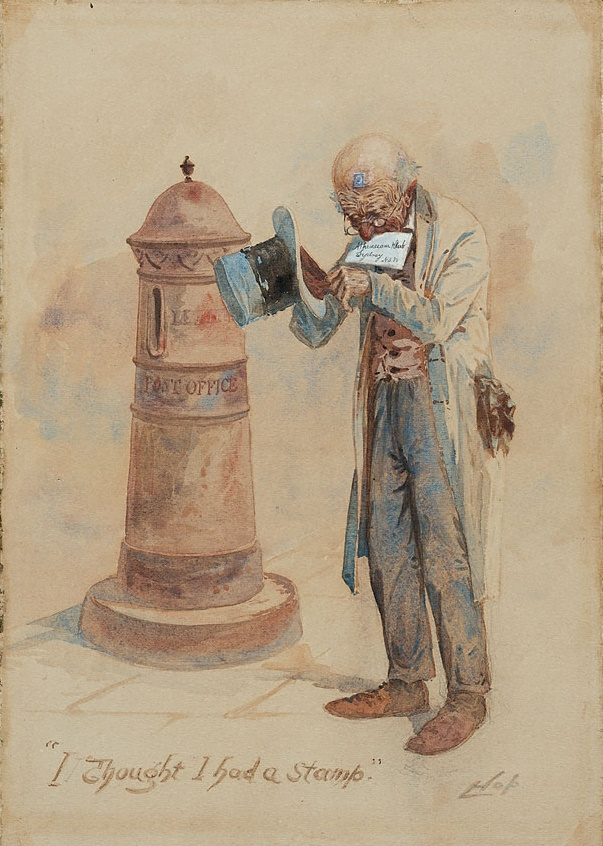
Watercolour painting (about 1885).

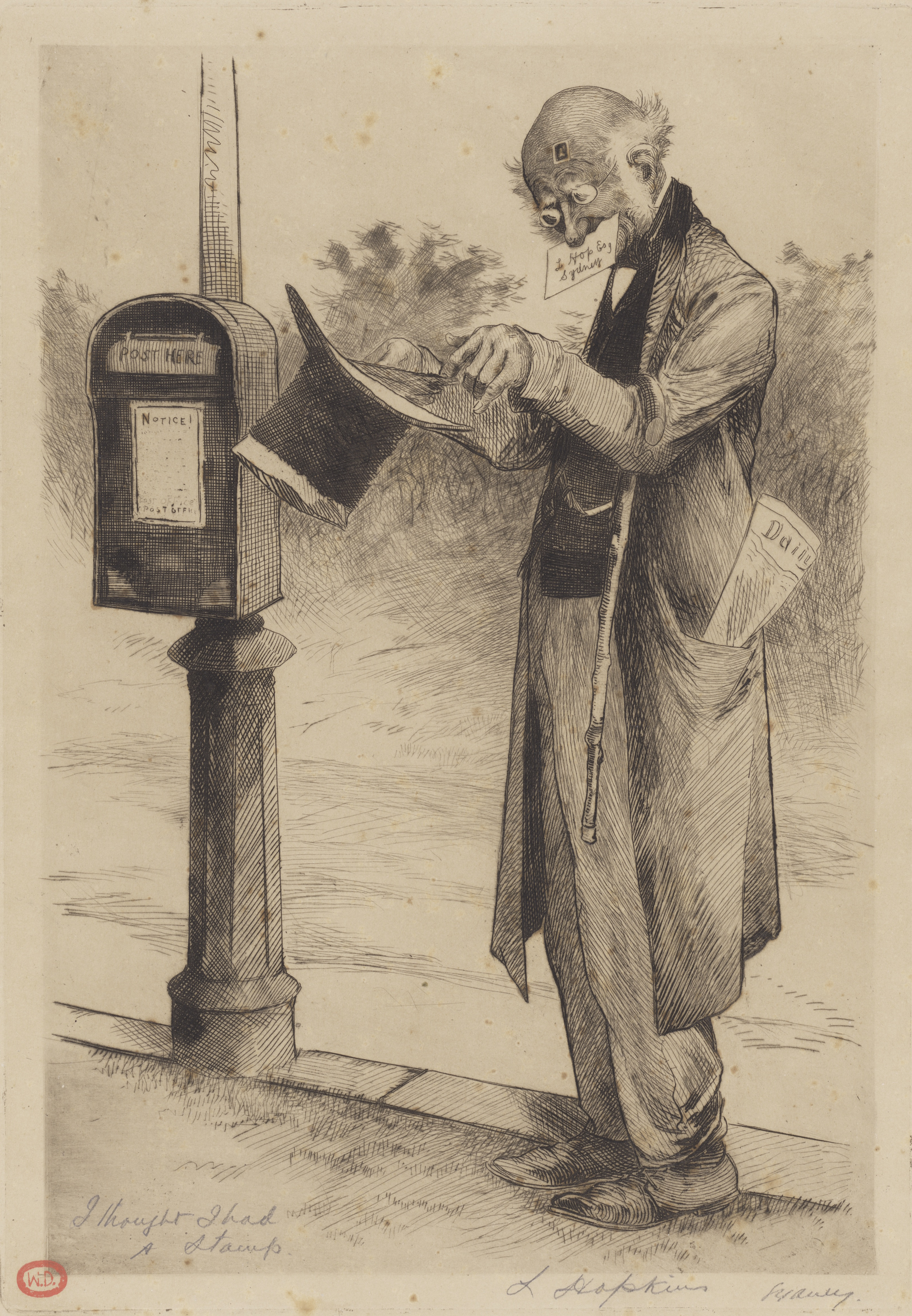
Etching (1898).

'I Thought I Had a Stamp' images by 'Hop'.

An image by Hop that became widely popular was 'I Thought I Had a Stamp', depicting an old man standing beside a post-box and searching the inside of his hat for a stamp in order to post a letter (unaware that the missing stamp had become attached to the front of his bald head). The image began as a watercolour painting completed in about 1885, which was subsequently reproduced as a coloured supplement in The Bulletin. By July 1885 a woodcut engraving of the image, produced by F. A. Sleap, was being printed in Melbourne. In 1898, as a result of "many inquiries" made at the Bulletin office for a copy of 'I Thought I Had a Stamp', Hopkins produced an etching of the image. In May 1898 thirty-five signed artist's proofs were offered for sale through the pages of The Bulletin at a cost of three guineas each. The limited edition etchings, printed by Hopkins himself, sold out.

Hopkins had a professional journeyman-like approach to his profession. Although he disagreed with many of the social and political viewpoints espoused in The Bulletin, "his cartoons were as incisive as though he personally endorsed its sentiments". His representations of politicians and the utilisation of potent symbolism complemented the Bulletin's editorial advocacy of economic and racial isolationism, republican nationalism and cultural chauvinism in the years before Federation. Hopkins had a prolific output; during his thirty years with The Bulletin he produced an estimated nineteen thousand drawings. By the late 1890s, when deadlines and pressure of work occasionally intervened to prevent the production of finished drawings, Hopkins introduced the concept of 'Hop's Understudy', the purported artist responsible for his more crudely drawn cartoons. In a biography of Hopkins published after his death, Dorothy Hopkins described her father as being moody when subjected to work pressure. Drawings by 'Hop's Understudy' were published irregularly up until 1915. In November 1899 Hopkins delivered a lecture titled 'The Dismal Art of Caricature' at the Richmond School of Arts. His presentation was advertised to include "numerous original colored illustrations – some of which will be executed on the premises".

By the time that Norman Lindsay joined the staff of The Bulletin in 1901, 'Hop' was a veteran artist at the magazine. Lindsay thought of Hopkins as dour and inflexible whose nearest approach to humour was "a kind of whimsical sadism". Hopkins had a strong sense of propriety, which some ascribed to his puritan roots (Lindsay described him as "a witch-hunting puritan"). On the other hand, Hopkins considered certain passages published in the Bulletin's 'red page' as "unfit for any young woman to read" and considered some of Norman Lindsay's illustrations to be salacious. The writer A. G. Stephens, who worked with Hop at The Bulletin, described the artist in 1905 as "shy, and in shyness seems stern; but his good nature in friendly company is unalloyed". Stephens added: "He always seems to me a Puritan born out of date, who has broadened in sympathy with his modern environment, yet has never quite succeeded in throwing out of his blood the ice of repressed forefathers".

Hopkins acquired shares in The Bulletin and eventually became a director. In 1901 he described himself as "part proprietor" of The Bulletin.

In 1903, after suffering a severe illness, Hopkins undertook a world tour, travelling to Japan, the United States and Europe. He intended meeting up with his old colleague Phil May when he reached England. However, after arriving in America, while reading a San Francisco newspaper Hopkins noticed "a cable announcement of May's death". As he later recalled: "my anticipation of enjoyment to be realised during the journey had been robbed of their chief feature". In America Hopkins travelled to Bellefontaine and Toledo where he revisited the places of his childhood.

Caricature by David Low

Hopkins was an enthusiastic player of bowls.^{[E]} He was a member of the Mosman Bowling Club, which formed in 1903, and served as the club's president in 1905–6. Hopkins participated in annual bowling contests between "representatives of Parliament and the Press", held on the parliamentary green. William Macleod, the managing director of The Bulletin, also lived in Mosman and was a fellow bowls player.

In December 1904 the Bulletin published a volume of selected drawings by Hopkins titled On the Hop. The collection, preceded by "a humorous autobiography", featured a wide selection of cartoons and caricatures from Hop's regular contributions to The Bulletin over the previous twenty-one years.

Hopkins output steadily declined in the years after Federation. By 1913 he had virtually retired, but continued to attend the Bulletin office and produce occasional cartoons for publication until 1921.

=== Later years ===
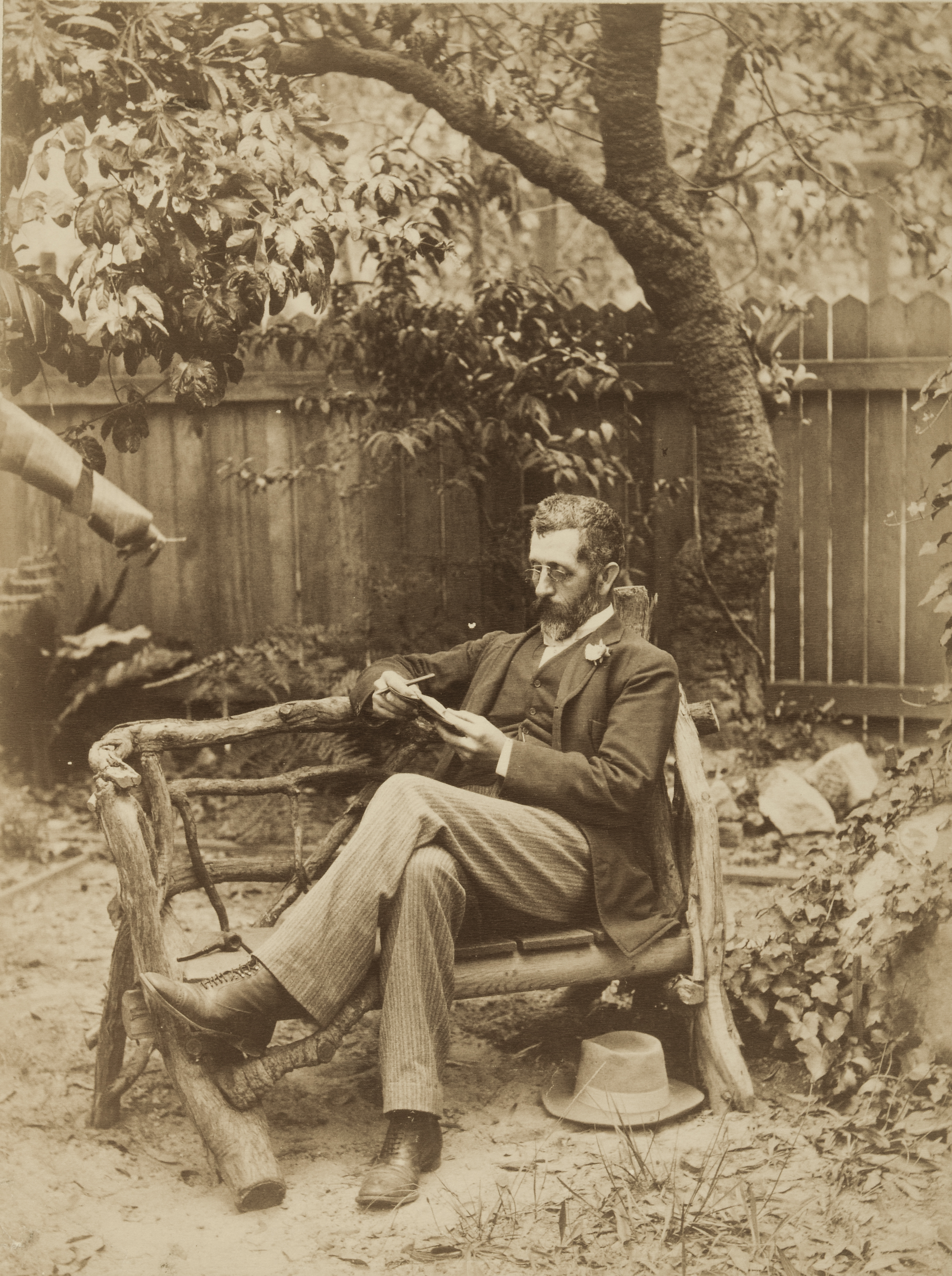
Livingston Hopkins in his garden at 'Fernham', Mosman.

In April 1914 Hopkins undertook a four-month tour of North America and England. In the United States he toured the battlefields of the Civil War. Hopkins returned to Sydney in August 1914 aboard the Manuka from New Zealand. He arrived "with his drawing hand in a sling" after having broken a finger on board the USS Tahiti during the voyage across the Pacific to New Zealand. The next time illustrations by Hop were published after his overseas trip was the Christmas edition of The Bulletin, published on 12 December 1914; titled 'The Author and The Typewriter', the artist imagined Shakespeare requiring the assistance of a typist while completing The Tragedy of Julius Caesar.

In April 1919 Hopkins' eldest son Daniel died, aged 41 years, in Sydney's Royal Prince Alfred Hospital of the Spanish influenza, leaving a widow and three children.

In his retirement Hopkins continued to construct and play violins and violoncellos, a practice he had engaged in since his younger days in America. Amongst his collection of musical instruments was a violoncello known as the 'Priest's Call', reputed to be of eighteenth century Italian make and an "old violin" bequeathed to him by the theatre manager George Rignold (who died in 1912).

Hopkins retained his American citizenship all his life, though his daughter Dorothy recorded that her father learned to love Australia and never regretted leaving his native land. The artist delighted in using American allusions. His study at 'Fernham' was called 'the wigwam' and his close friend and fellow artist, Albert Fullwood, was known familiarly as 'Uncle Remus'. After the outbreak of World War I there was a groundswell of community disapproval and disquiet in Australia regarding the United States' decision to remain neutral in the conflict. In February 1915 a feature cartoon by Hopkins in The Bulletin, 'Kaiser Bill Returns the Compliment', depicting President Woodrow Wilson being confronted by the ghost of George Washington, was explicitly anti-German (and by implication critical of America's neutral stance).

Hop's final cartoon for The Bulletin was published on 7 July 1921, on the occasion of the artist's 75th birthday. It featured an image of Hopkins shaking hands with himself (captioned: "his understudy is seen wishing him 'Many happy returns'"), with the central image surrounded by selected cartoons from his long career with the journal.

Livingston 'Hop' Hopkins died on 21 August 1927 at Mosman, Sydney, aged 81. His funeral was held the following day, leaving Wood Coffill's mortuary chapel in George Street and proceeding to the crematorium at Rookwood where a service was held and the body cremated. Hopkins was survived by four daughters and a son. His estate was valued at over £44,000. To the trustees of the Mitchell Library Hopkins bequeathed a collection of cuttings and artwork, amounting to 27 volumes, of his contributions to The Bulletin beginning from June 1883.

== Publications ==
- A Comic History of the United States (1876), New York: G. W. Carleton & Co.
- On the Hop: A Selection from the Australian Drawings of Livingston Hopkins ("Hop" of "The Bulletin") (1904), Sydney: William Macleod (for the Bulletin Newspaper Co.).

== Galleries ==
A selection of images by Livingston Hopkins ('Hop')
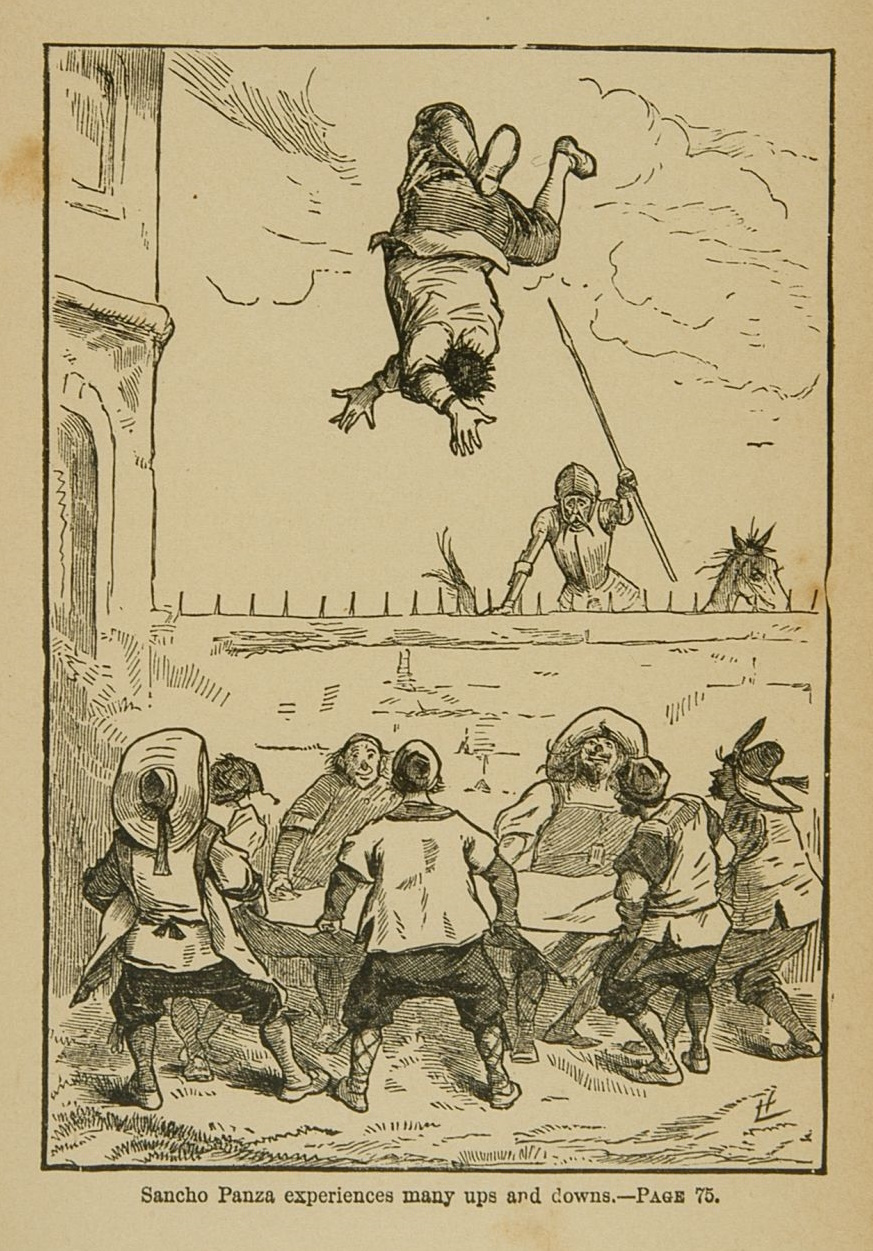
'Sancho Panza experiences many ups and downs', a chapter illustration from Don Quixote (1870).

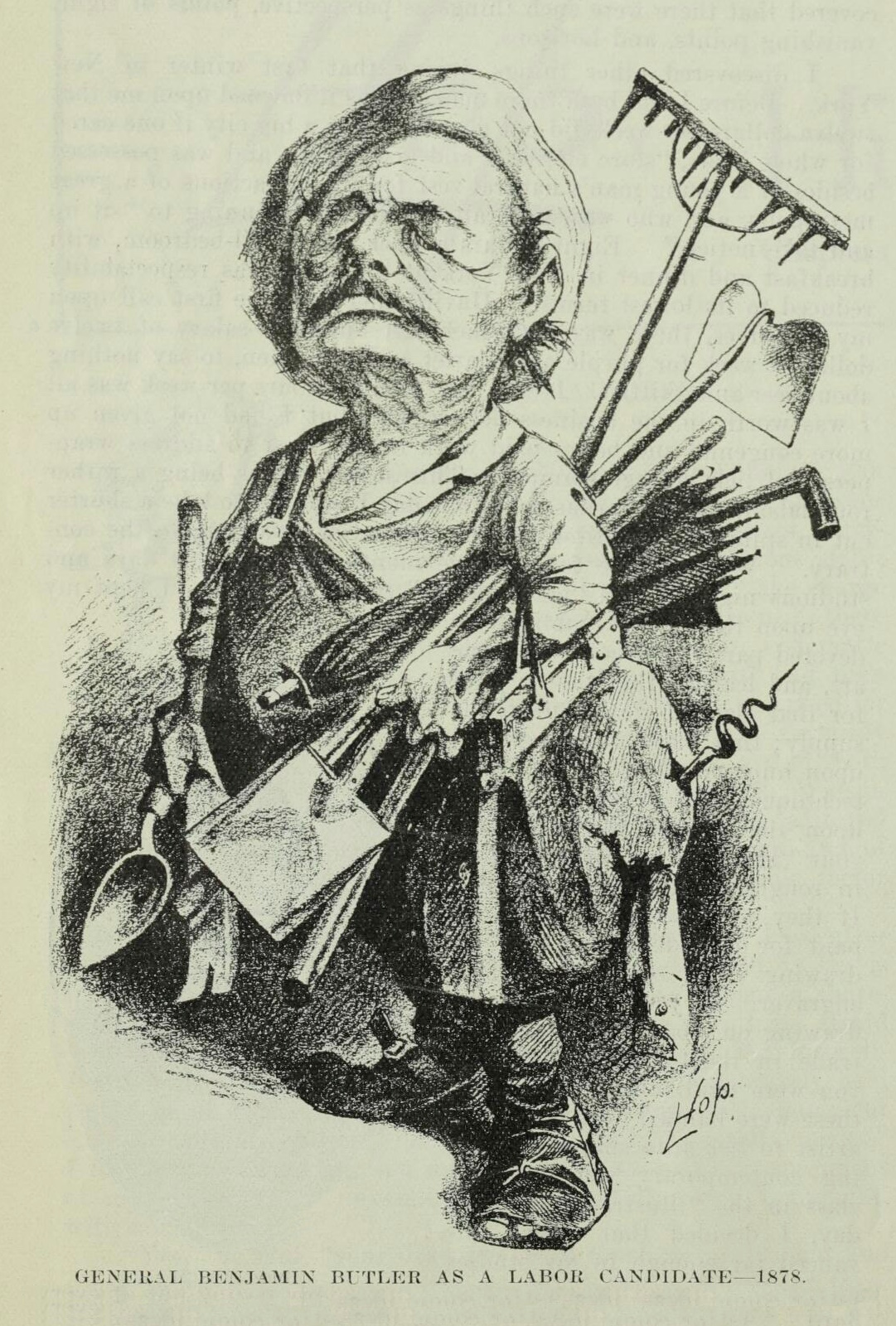
'General Benjamin Butler as a Labor Candidate', originally published in The Daily Graphic (1878).

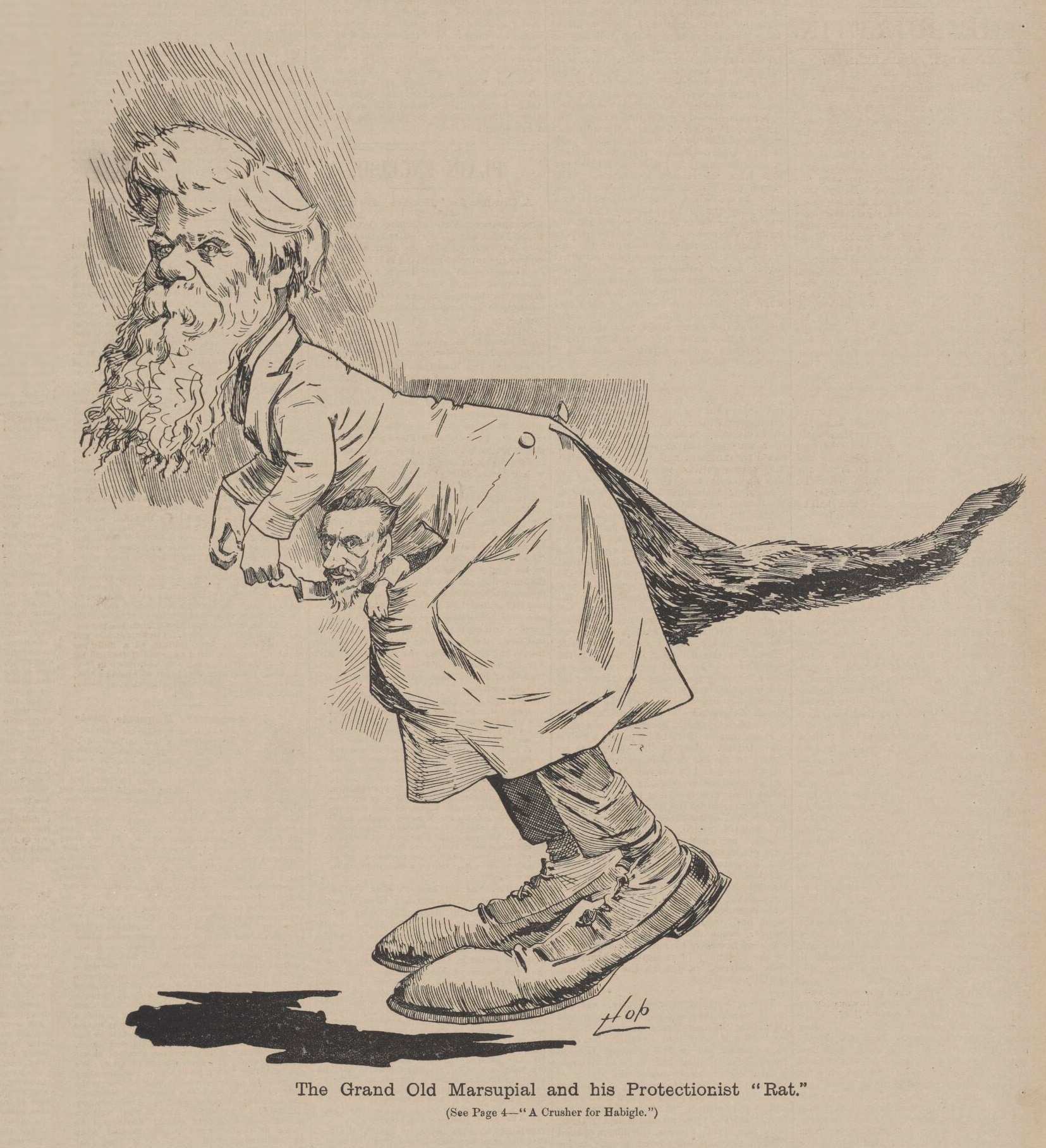
'The Grand Old Marsupial and His Protectionist "Rat"', featuring caricatures of the politicians Henry Parkes and Francis Abigail (The Bulletin, 12 February 1887).

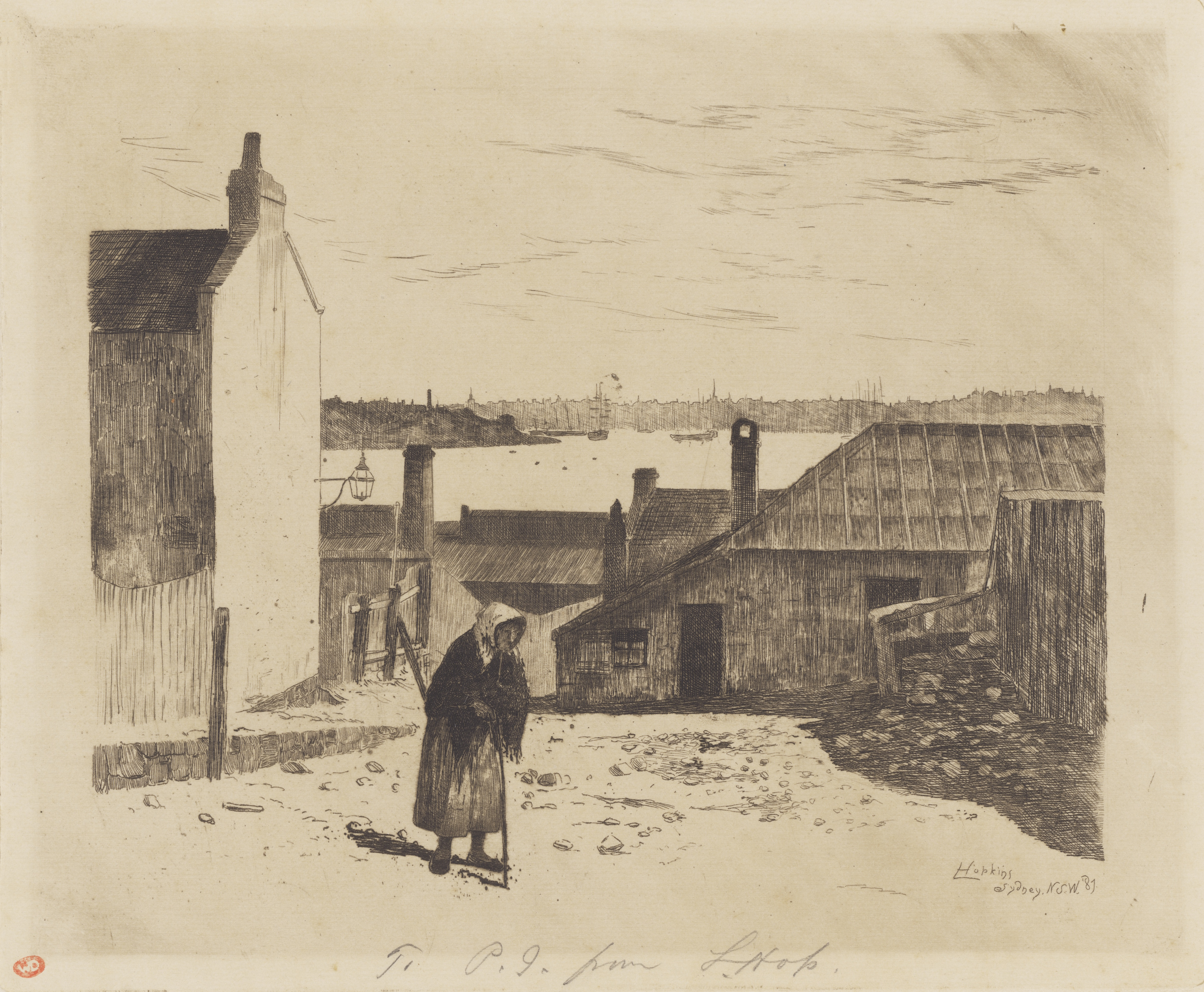
'Old woman in urban street', an etching dated 1887.

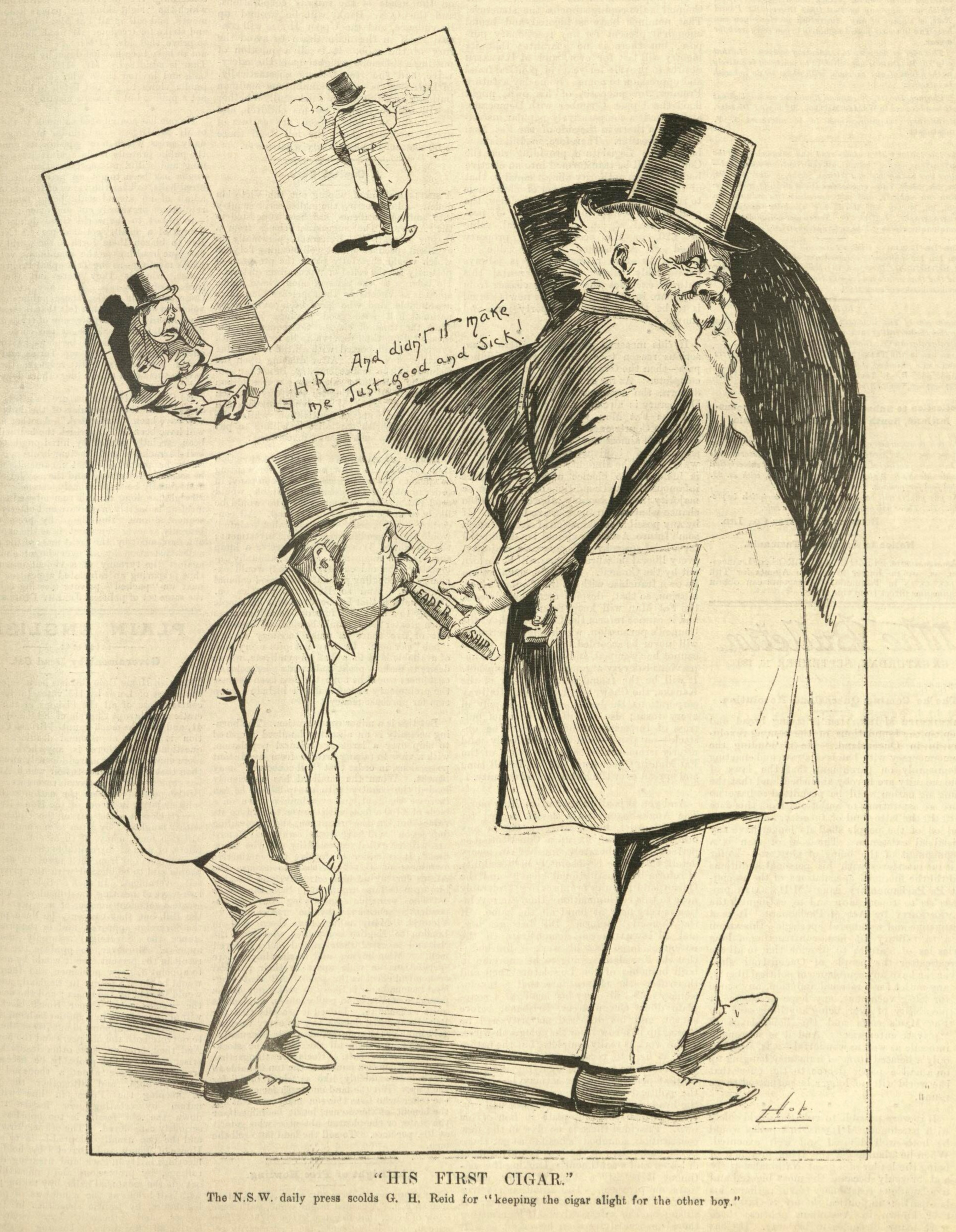
'His First Cigar' (The Bulletin, 16 September 1893), featuring caricatures of George Reid and Henry Parkes.

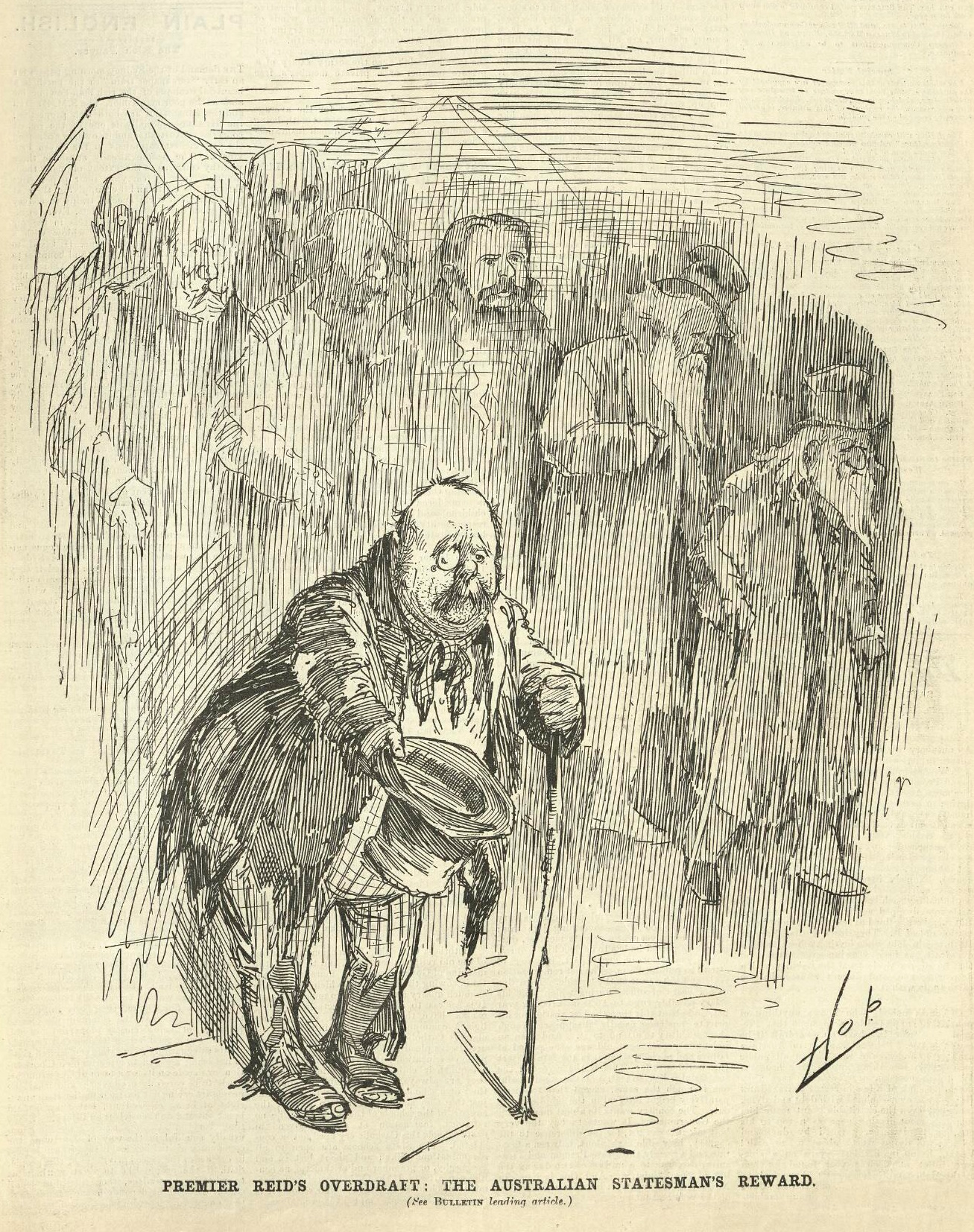
'Premier Reid's Overdraft: The Australian Statesman's Reward' (The Bulletin, 29 July 1899).

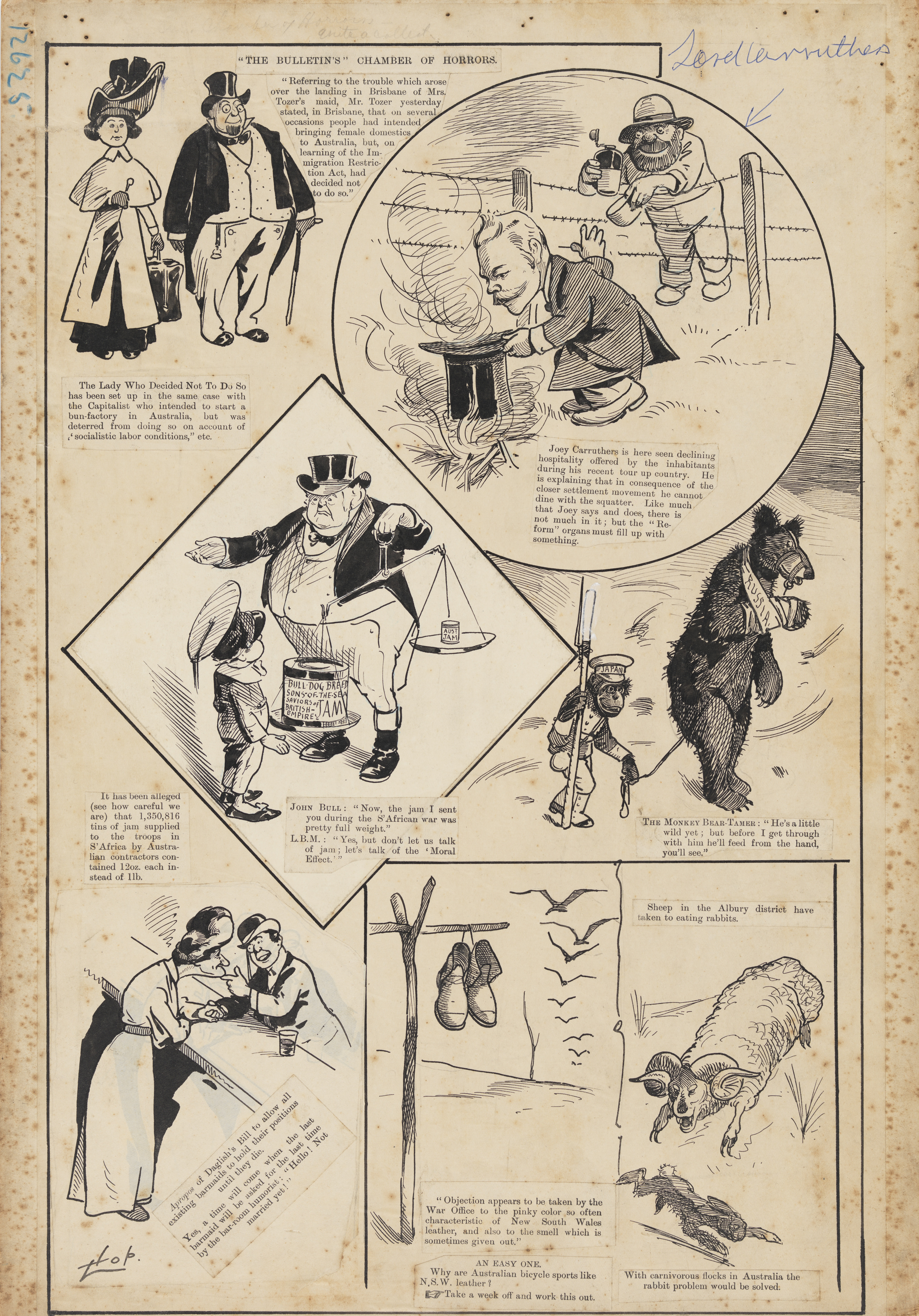
Artwork for 'Jam, Hospitality and Other Topics', as published in The Bulletin, 23 March 1905.
A selection of portraits of Livingston Hopkins ('Hop')
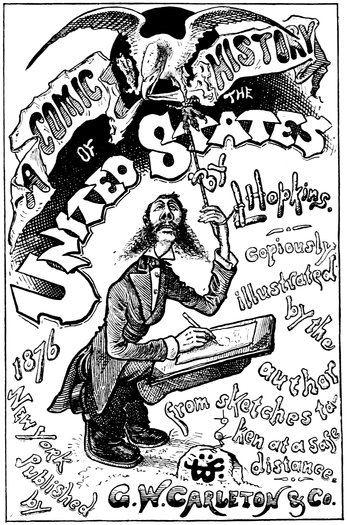
Self-portrait (cartoon), from the title page of A Comic History of the United States (1876).

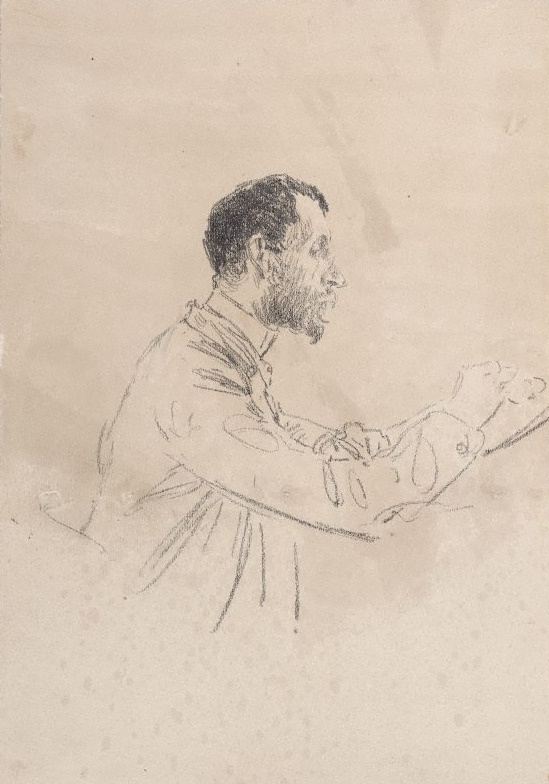
'Hop' by William Thomas Smedley (pencil on paper), dated about the mid-1880s.

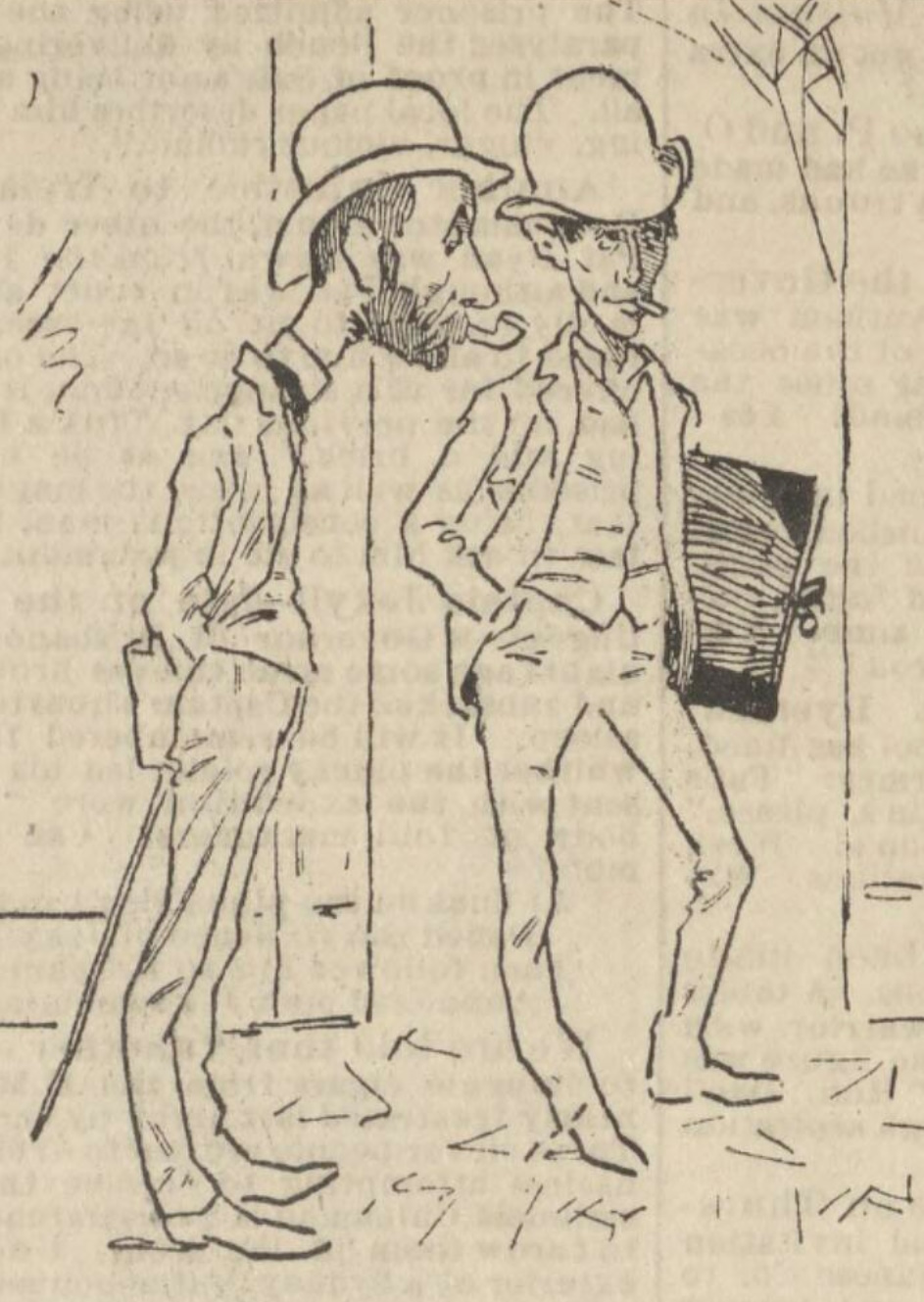
Caricatures of Hopkins and Phil May (by Phil May), from The Bulletin, 30 January 1886.

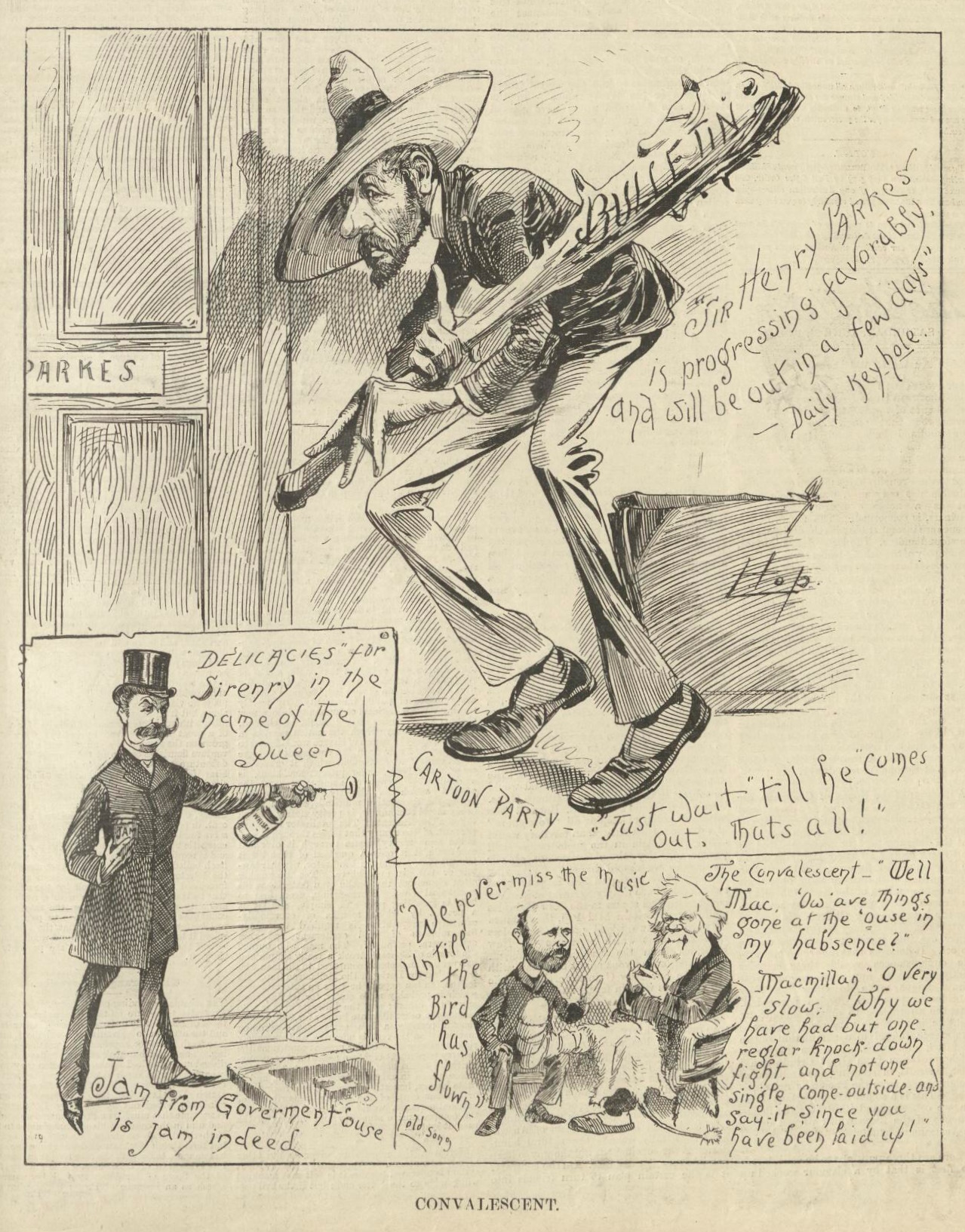
'Convalescent' by Hop, on the theme of the convalescence of Henry Parkes after a cab accident, featuring a self-portrait of the artist (The Bulletin, 21 June 1890).

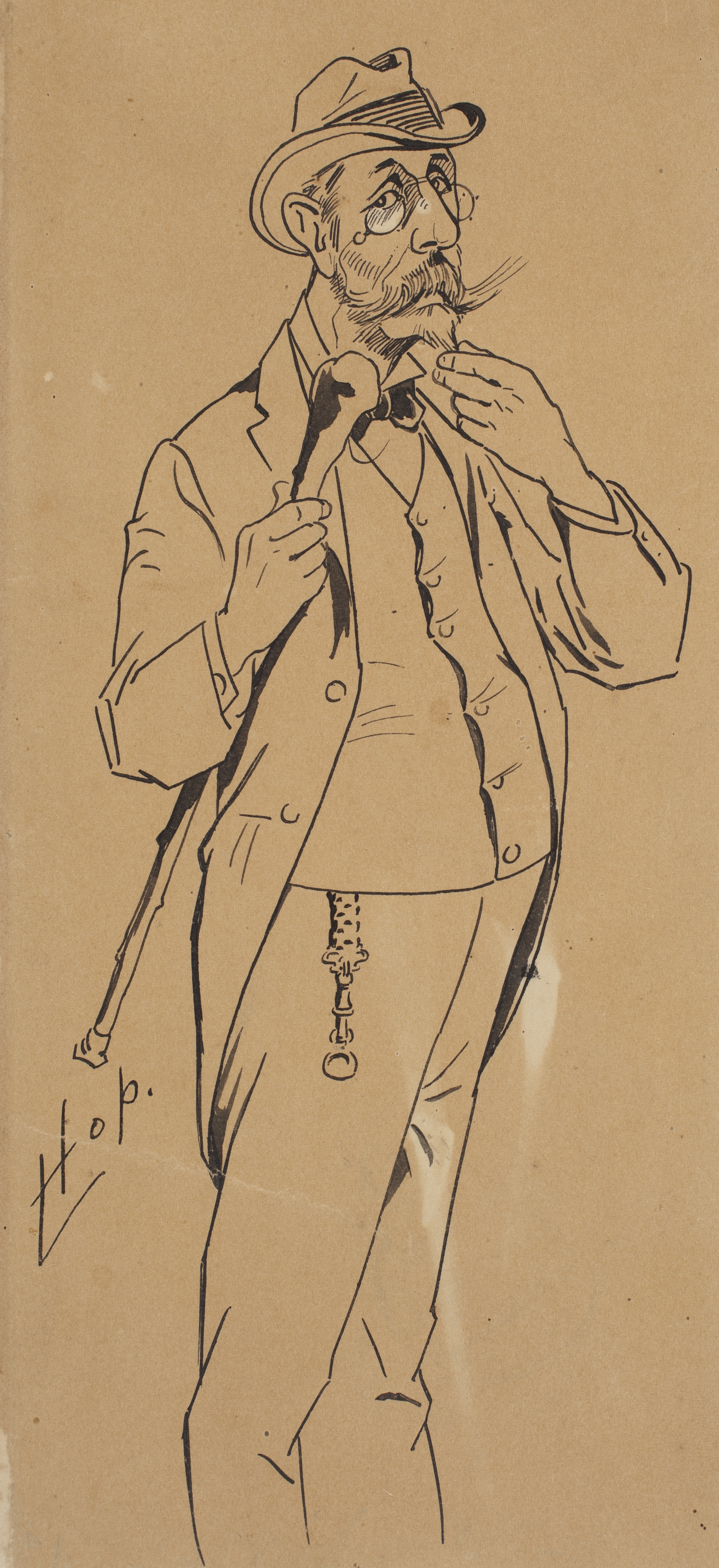
Self-portrait (about 1910).

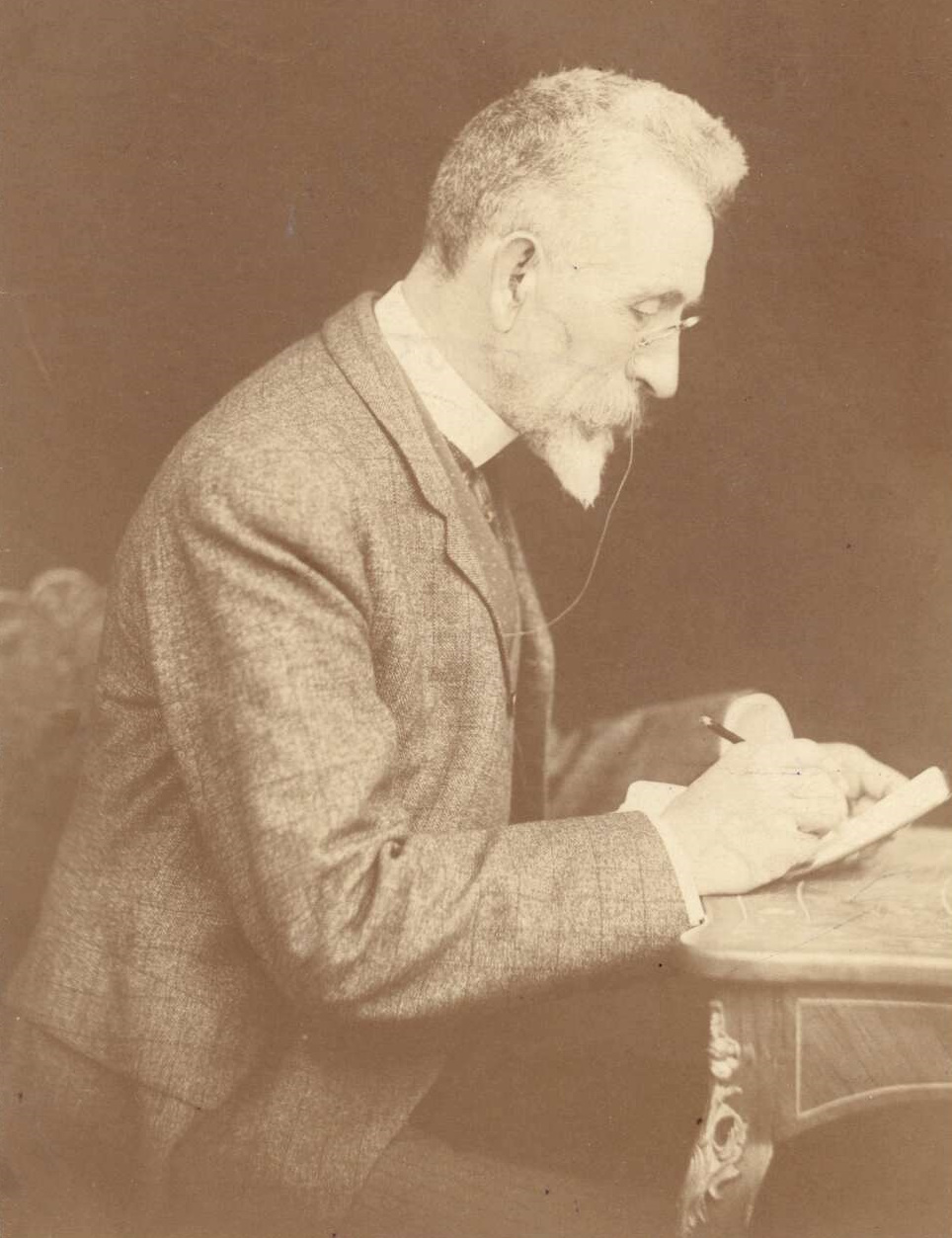
Photographic portrait of Livingston Hopkins.

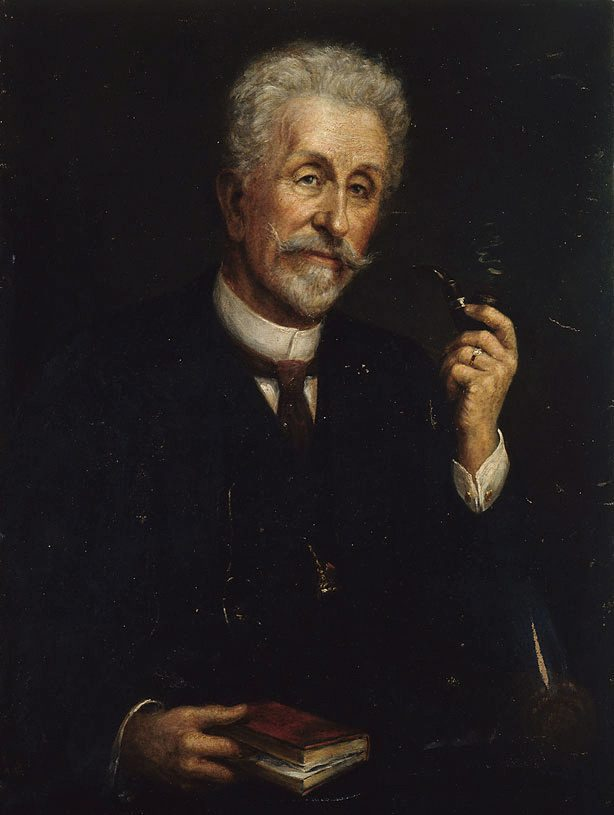
'Portrait of Livingston Hopkins' by William Macleod (oil on canvas), dated 1922.

== Notes ==
A.Hopkins' older brother, Owen Johnston Hopkins, was a volunteer on active service with the Union Army throughout the Civil War, taking part in battles and sieges including the Cumberland campaign (1861-2) and the Vicksburg campaign (1863). The wartime diaries and letters of Owen Hopkins were published in 1998 in a volume edited by Otto Bond.

B.The 'Dupuis method' was set forth and explained by Alexandre Dupuis, a teacher at the Collège Saint-Louis in Paris. His manual, Teaching Drawing from an Industrial Point of View, was published in 1836. Dupuis was critical of the elitist character of drawing and challenged the practice of training artists by drawing from the live model based on the delineation of contour. His method advocated an initial process of drawing simple rectilinear forms and gradually advancing to more complex rounded ones.

C.In Hopkins' 'Confessions', published in The Lone Hand in March 1914, the artist recalled that he first illustrated the 1873 Farmer's Allminax. However, illustrations in the annual publication for the years 1870 to 1872 also include Hopkins' characteristic signature (combining the initials 'LH'). Kershner's 1954 article states that Hopkins illustrated "nine numbers" of the Farmer's Allminax, though the evidence from the publications themselves indicates he illustrated all ten (from 1870 to 1879).

D.In 1888 Hopkins and Phil May illustrated The History of Botany Bay by Arthur Gayll (the pen-name of Frank J. Donahue), a Bulletin publication.

E.A cartoon by 'Hop' called 'The Flowing Bowl', published in December 1897, satirises the game of bowls. It depicts an aged defendant standing before a magistrate in a courtroom, explaining "the cause of his awful downfall"; in a hoarse whisper he mumbles: "At the age of 96 I took to bowls". With the caption: "There was not a dry eye in the court-room", the cartoon shows the magistrate and court officials overcome with emotion at his words.
