= Archibald Fountain =

Fountain in Sydney, Australia

Coordinates: 33.87099°S 151.21182°E

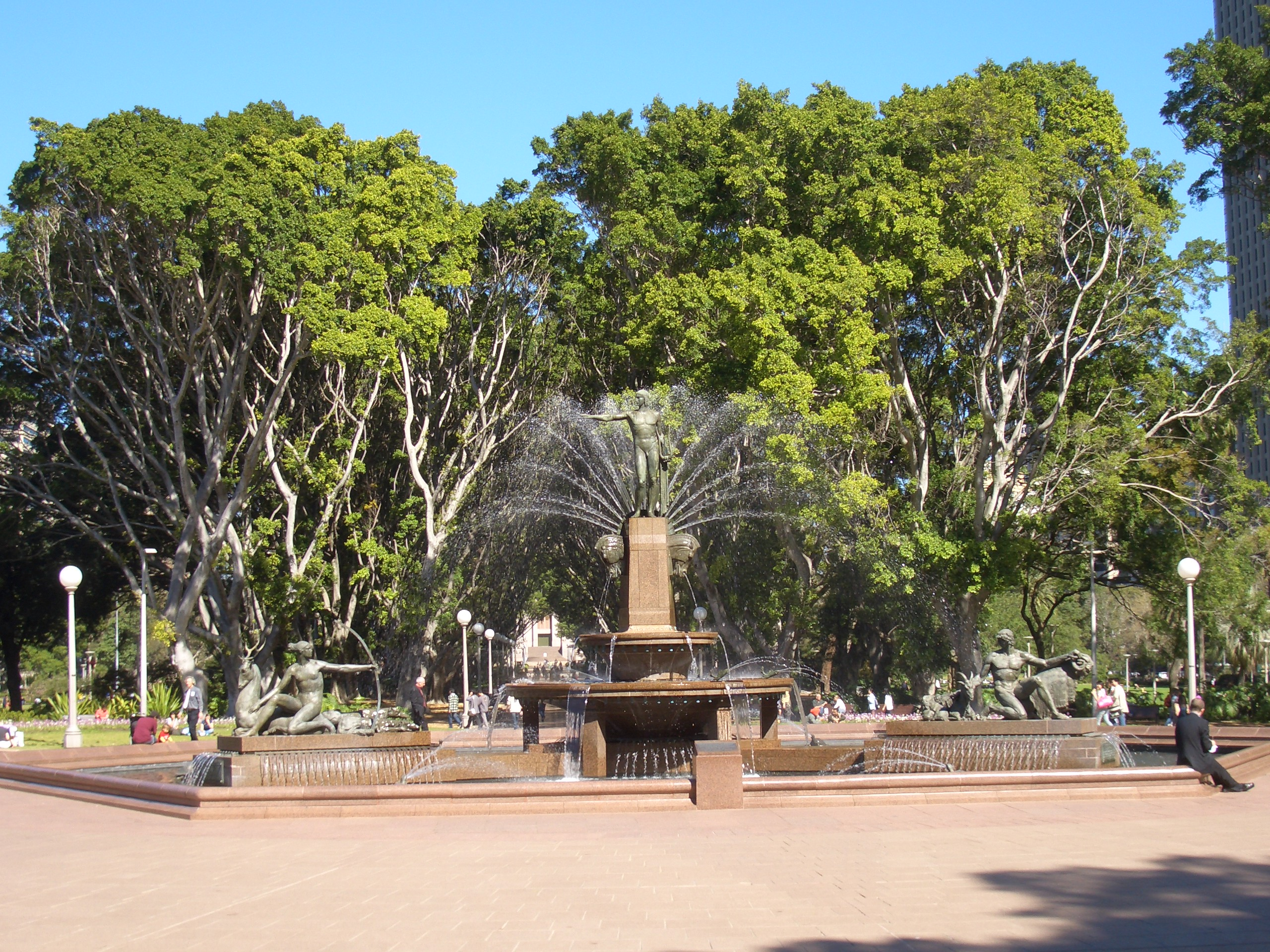
Archibald Fountain, Hyde Park, Sydney

The Archibald Fountain, properly called the J. F. Archibald Memorial Fountain, is located in Hyde Park, in central Sydney. It is named after J. F. Archibald, owner and editor of The Bulletin magazine, who bequeathed funds to have it built. Archibald specified that it must be designed by a French artist, both because of his great love of French culture and to commemorate the association of Australia and France in World War I. He wished Sydney to aspire to Parisian civic design and ornamentation. The artist chosen was François-Léon Sicard, who completed it in Paris in 1926 but never saw the sculpture be placed in Sydney, where it was unveiled on 14 March 1932 by the Lord Mayor of Sydney, Samuel Walder.

== Description ==
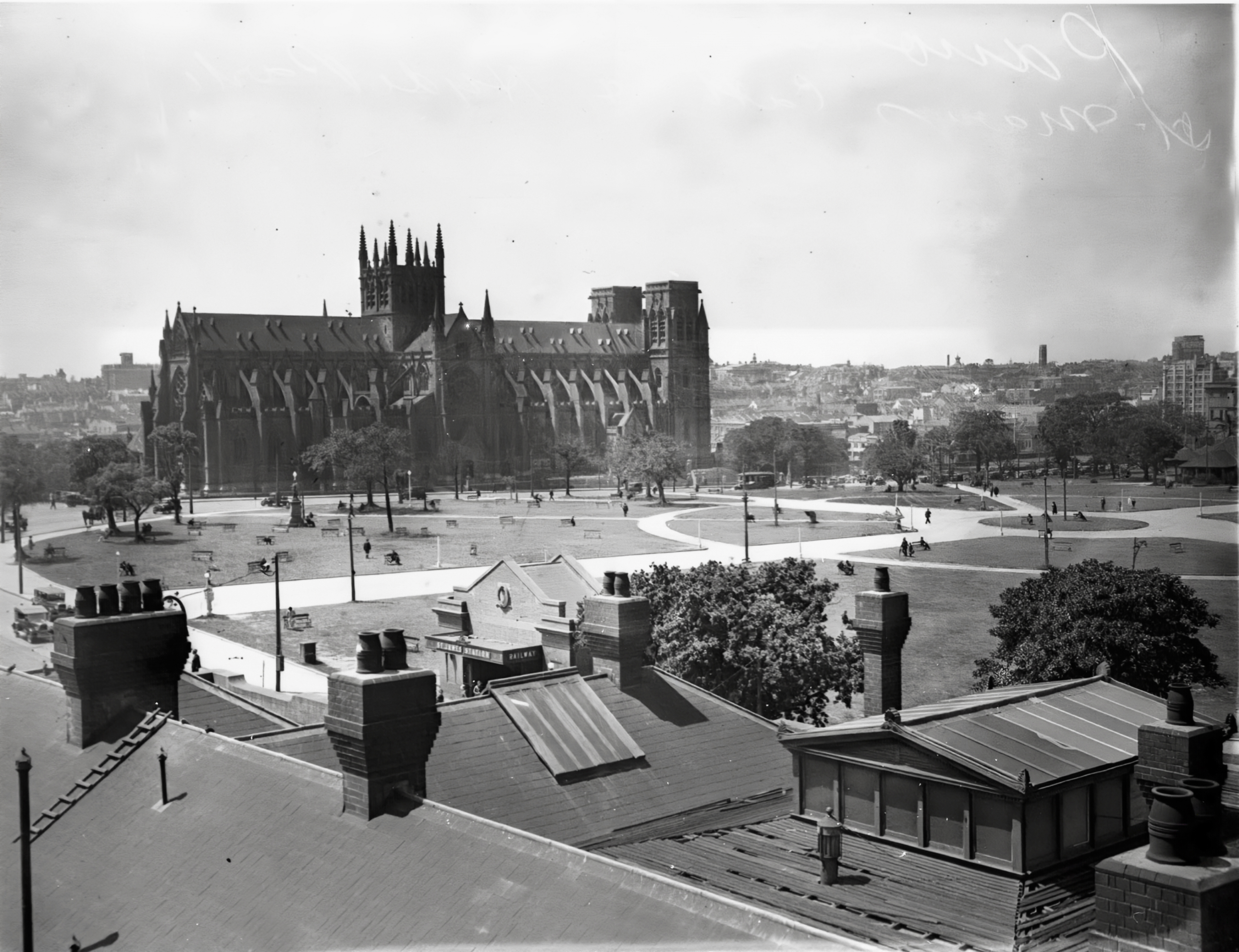
St Mary's Cathedral and Hyde Park without the fountain, Sydney, c. 1930

Pan sculpture (nighttime), Archibald Foundation, Hyde Park, Sydney, c. 1933

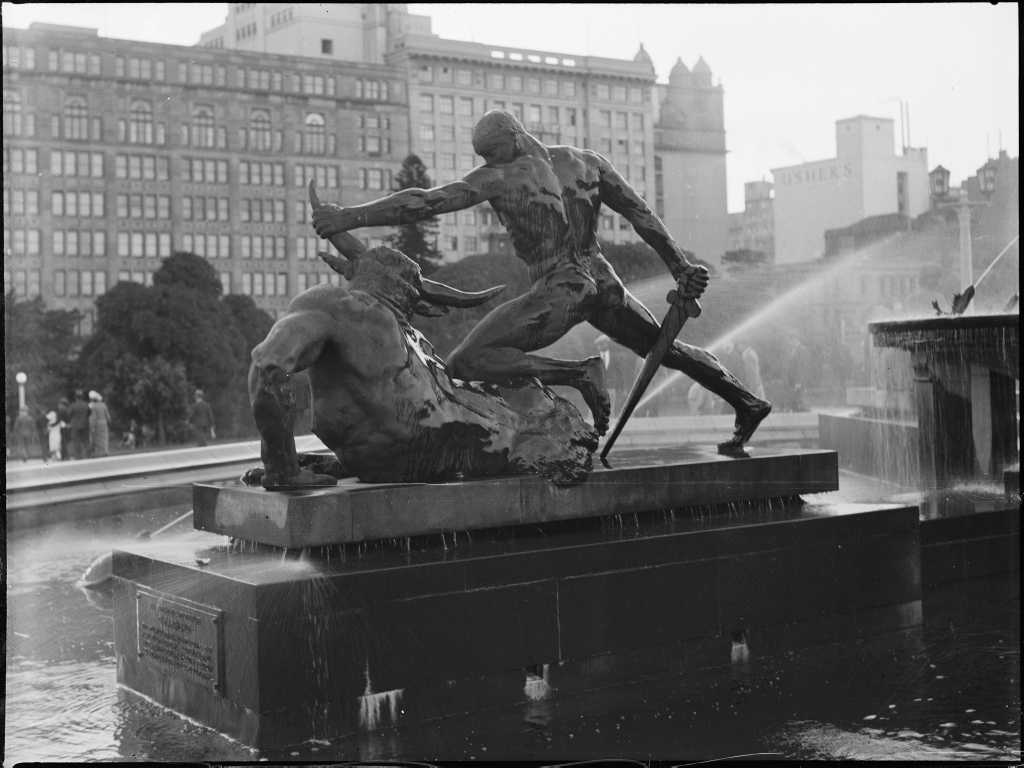
Theseus and the Minotaur sculptural group (1940s)

Sicard was one of the foremost sculptors of his day, a classically educated artist, whose inspiration was derived, at least in part, from his study of classical Greek and Roman art and literature. In submitting his proposal for the design of the sculptural groups, Sicard wrote: "Apollo represents the Arts (Beauty and Light). Apollo holds out his right arm as a sign of protection, and spreads his benefits over all Nature, whilst he holds the Lyre in his left hand. Apollo is the warmth which vivifies, giving life to all Nature. At the touch of his rays, men awake, trees and fields become green, the animals go out into the fields, and men go to work at dawn.

"The ancient Pliny adored the sun, symbol of Life. It is on this account that I wished this figure to be the chief one in the memorial."

An inscription on the fountain continues: "At Apollo's feet the Star of Day is indicated by a semi-circle of which the rays spread out in jets of light (the rising sun). The horse's heads represent the horses of Apollo's chariot. Out of the nostrils, water falls into the first basin, to fall there into the second and run away into the large basin.

"The large basin is decorated with six tortoises which throw jets of water. The large basin is divided into three groups; one represents Artemis, goddess of purity, of peaceful nights, symbol of charity: the ideal which watches over mortals-all that stands for poetry and harmony. The Pan group symbolises the good things of the earth – it is the 'Young God of the fields and pastures and of the countryside'. The third group represents sacrifice for the public good. Theseus vanquisher of the Minotaur. The spirit triumphs over bestiality. Theseus delivers his country from the ransom which it had to pay to this monster. It is the sacrifice of himself for the good of humanity. Between these groups dolphins throw jets of water." The fountain is electrically illuminated and floodlit at night.

Sicard quotes Pliny as one of the ancient Roman sources for the modern understanding of the qualities supposedly represented by the gods. Rather than merely using the visual examples of works such as those by Pheidias, the iconic sculptor of classical Athens, whose free standing and frieze statuary represent the acme of the classical depiction of the human form in larger-than life bronze or marble, Sicard used literary sources to explain the symbology behind the form.

His choice of classical figures was in keeping with the European tradition of the sculpture and architecture of the precinct of Hyde Park. There is no indication in the writings of Sicard, or indeed, in the appraisal of his work, that there was any intention to link the figures in the sculptural groups with any religious or sexual themes.

== Conservation ==
In 2013 the fountain underwent conservation work including "the careful cleaning of all the elements, the waxing of the bronze figures and the repointing of the granite base and surround."

== Popular culture ==
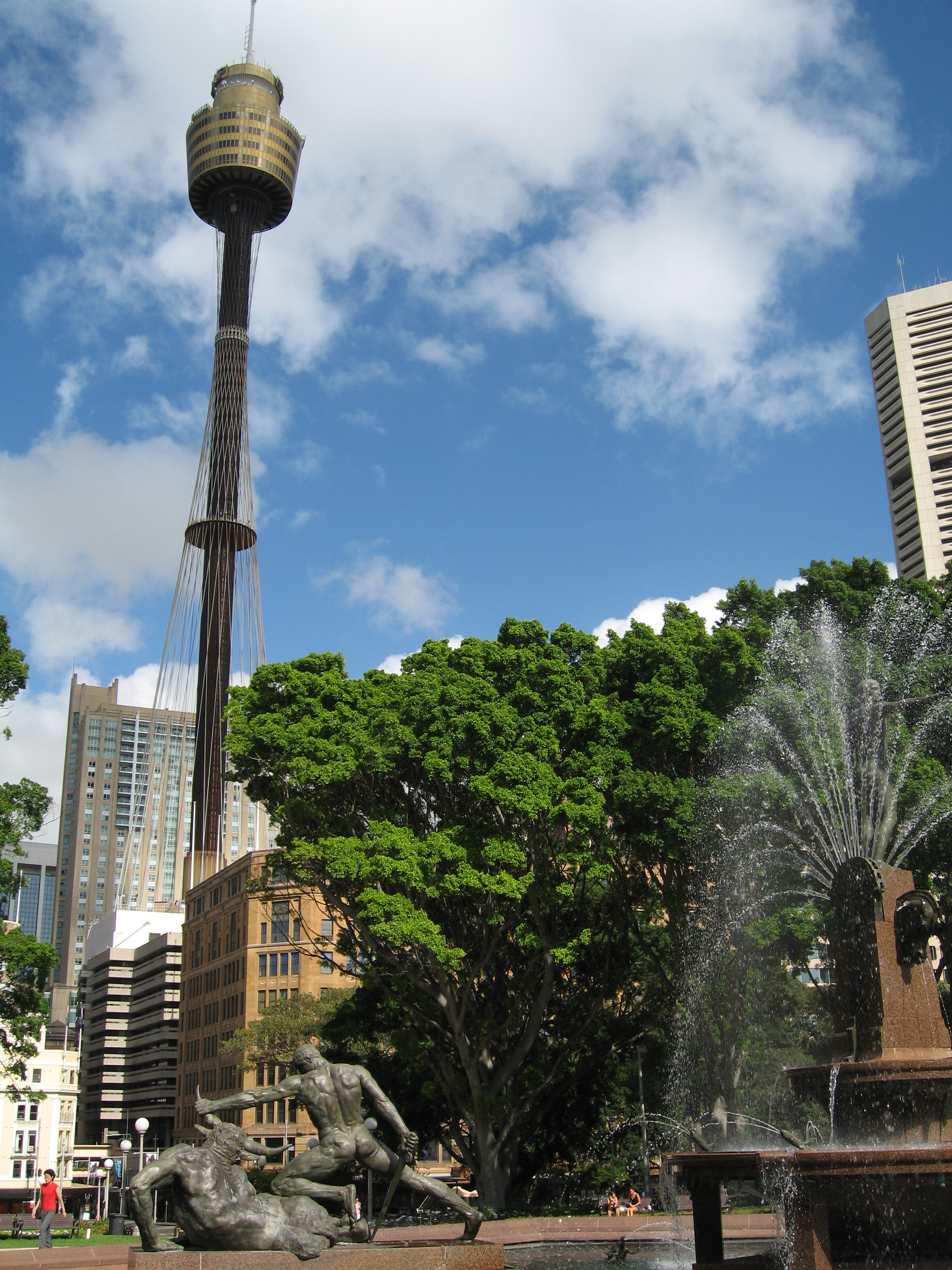
The Fountain, with Sydney Tower in the background

The popularity of the Archibald Fountain has been attributed to "the interplay of water and sculpture, and also little elements that kids like." Over the years it has also been a chosen spot for photos, buskers, political rallies and just as a meeting place. The fountain is in an open space surrounded by formal flower gardens and has park benches provided nearby that make it a popular location for city workers at lunchtime.

The Archibald Fountain is also known as one of the most homoerotic examples of public art in Australia. For the gay community, from around World War II up until the 1950s, the fountain was a 'beat'. Indeed it was a meeting place for men who wanted to pick up other men for casual and consensual sex. The Australian author, Kylie Tennant also features the Archibald Fountain in her 1967 novel: Tell Morning This, where she acknowledges it as a homosexual rendezvous.

== See also ==
- Archibald Prize
