= William Macleod =

Australian artist and magazine proprietor (1850–1929)

William Macleod

William Macleod (27 October 1850 – 24 June 1929), was an Australian artist and a partner in The Bulletin. He was described as generous, hospitable, a 'big man with a ponderous overhang of waistfront, a trim, grey beard, the curling moustachios of a cuirassier, and brown, kindly eyes gleaming through his spectacles'.

== Early life ==
Caricature by David Low

Macleod was born in London. His father was of a Scottish Highlands family and his mother Cornish/German. The family emigrated to Australia in 1854 or 1855, drawn by the potential for riches from the Victorian goldrush, but Macleod's father died a year later.

His mother moved to Sydney and was remarried to James Anderson, a portrait painter. Anderson's heavy drinking and the family's parlous financial state forced Macleod to find work at the age of 12. He found employment as an assistant to a professional photographer, and began studying at a school of the arts. His studies led to the production of a number of paintings and stained glass designs, and by the age of 17 Macleod was earning enough from commissions to purchase a home for his mother, away from her husband. For a time he also worked as a drawing master in schools.

== Career ==
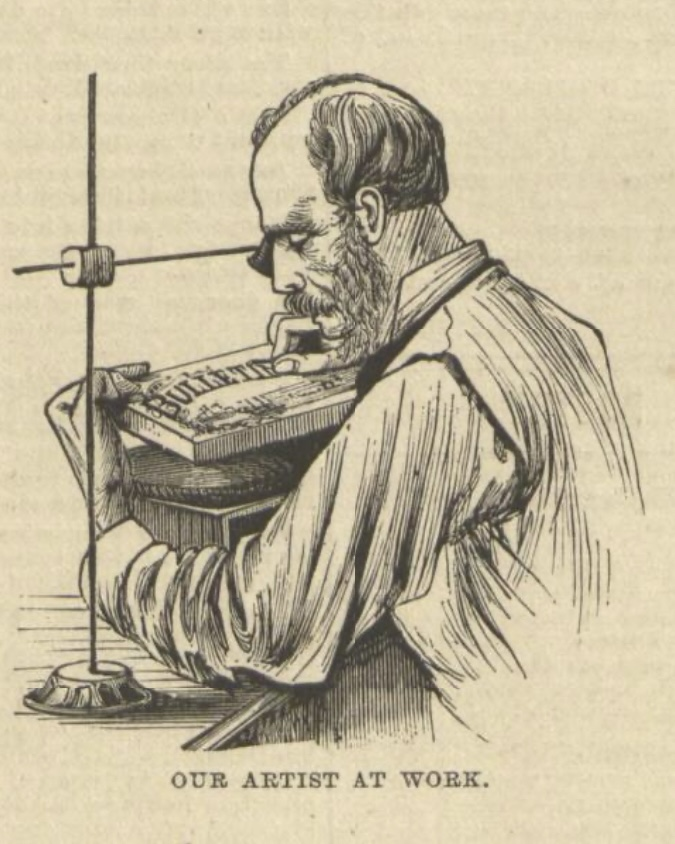
Macleod at work in 1880 creating the masthead for The Bulletin on lithographic limestone

Months after The Bulletin was launched, he and another artist, Samuel Begg, purchased a third share of the magazine, but relinquished it when the founders, J. F. Archibald and John Haynes were more financially secure.

He published the literary magazine The Bookfellow from January 1899 to May 1899 as an adjunct to The Bulletin's "Red Pages".

== Late life ==
In 1901, known as 'Mr Bulletin McLeod', he was the toastmaster at the send-off dinner at the Hotel Australia to Scottish Border poet and Australian bush balladeer Will H. Ogilvie (1869–1963). Ogilvie was one of The Bulletin's stable of poets.

Macleod did sculpture. This included by 'Mac' a side profile of close friend and The Bulletin cartoonist 'Hop' Hopkins. Recreationally he enjoyed lawn bowls, being a founding member of one club and president for eight years, and president for seven years of another.

In 1923, Macleod was a finalist in the third annual Archibald Prize, named for fellow Bulletin founder, along with G. W. Lambert and others. His subject was again close friend 'Hop' Hopkins.

He was married twice; firstly to Emily Collins in 1873 (d. April 1910), and secondly in 1911 to author Agnes Conor O'Brien. In 1926 he retired from The Bulletin, and died on 24 June 1929, aged 78, at his house 'Dunvegan', Musgrave Street, Mosman, Sydney. Macleod was survived by O'Brien, son Ronald Henry Macleod (d. 1941) and two daughters, Annie May and Amy Isabel Macleod, of the first marriage. Son Norman, aged 35, and daughter Ada, aged about 40, both died in 1919 from influenza. O'Brien died in March 1934 at Mosman.

== Additional reading ==
- Serle, Percival (1949). "Macleod, William". Dictionary of Australian Biography. Sydney: Angus & Robertson.
- B. G. Andrews, 'Macleod, William (1850–1929)', Australian Dictionary of Biography, Volume 10, MUP, 1986, pp 335–336.

Additional resources listed by the Australian Dictionary of Biography

- G. A. Taylor, Those Were the Days (Syd, 1918)
- M. Mahood, The Loaded Line (Melb, 1973)
- P. Rolfe, The Journalistic Javelin (Syd, 1979)
- S. Lawson, The Archibald Paradox (Melb, 1983)
- Scottish Australasian, 1 April 1911
- Newspaper News, 1 July 1929
- Bowyang, 7, 1982
- Daily Telegraph (Sydney), 21 June 1924
- Bulletin, 26 June 1929
- manuscript catalogue under Macleod (State Library of New South Wales)
