= J. F. Archibald =

Australian journalist (1856–1919)

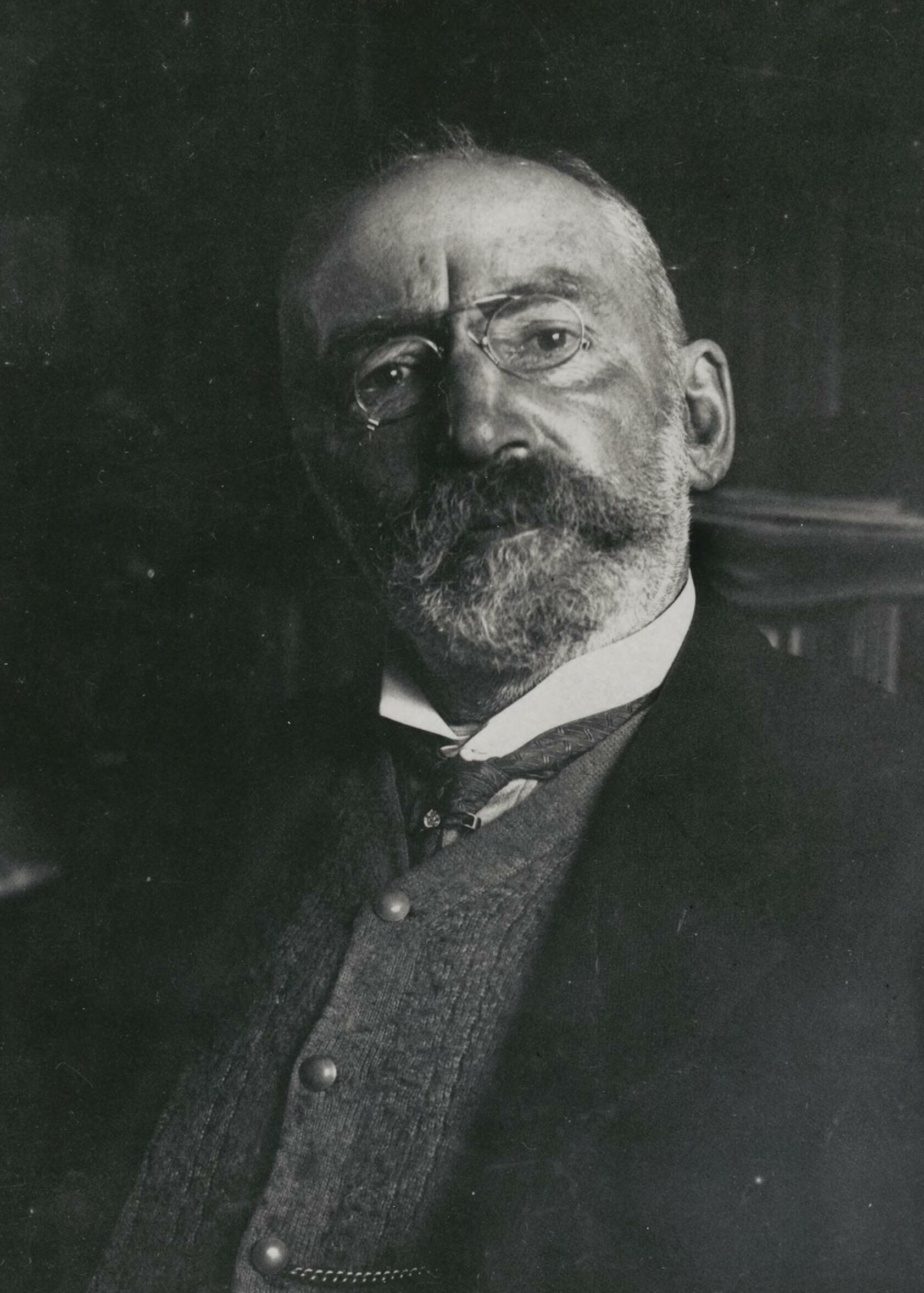
- Archibald, c. 1910
- Born: John Feltham Archibald; 14 January 1856; Kildare, Victoria, Australia
- Died: 10 September 1919 (aged 63); Sydney, New South Wales, Australia
- Resting place: Waverley Cemetery
- Monuments: Archibald Fountain, Hyde Park, Sydney
- Other names: Jules François Archibald; Archie
- Occupations: Accountant; Journalist; Entrepreneur
- Known for: Bequest to enable establishment of the Archibald Prize
- Notable work: The Bulletin; The Lone Hand

Jules François Archibald (born John Feltham Archibald, 14 January 1856 – 10 September 1919) was an Australian journalist and publisher, best known for co-founding and editing The Bulletin, Australia's most popular magazine in the late 19th and early 20th centuries. He was also the founder and namesake of the annual Archibald Prize, Australia's most prestigious art prize for portraiture.

== Biography ==
Born to an Irish Catholic family in Kildare, now known as Geelong West, Victoria, he was baptised John Feltham Archibald, but changed his forenames in later life "when he became an enthusiast in everything French". Contemporary associates affectionately knew him as "Archie" and expressed admiration for his journalistic flair, literary perspicacity and culinary talents. He was also a target of humour because of his pretentious name change (pronounced "Jules Franswa") and false pretensions to having a part-Scottish father and a French Jewish mother.

After working as an accountant, journalist (with the Melbourne Daily Telegraph), public servant and miner in Victoria and Queensland, Archibald arrived in Sydney in 1878, where he formed a partnership with John Haynes and William Macleod, and on 31 January 1880 they launched The Bulletin as a weekly paper of political, business and literary news. William Henry Traill became a partner in 1882, and the following year Archibald left for two years in London. When he returned in 1886, the magazine was struggling, and Archibald bought out the other partners.

Under Archibald's sole control, and with A. G. Stephens as his literary editor, The Bulletin became Australia's leading outlet for poets, cartoonists, and authors of fiction and humour. Archibald had no life outside the magazine and devoted his every waking hour to it. It was his decision to open The Bulletin's pages to contributions from readers, and his brand of radical, republican, xenophobic politics that the magazine reflected for the 16 years he controlled its content.

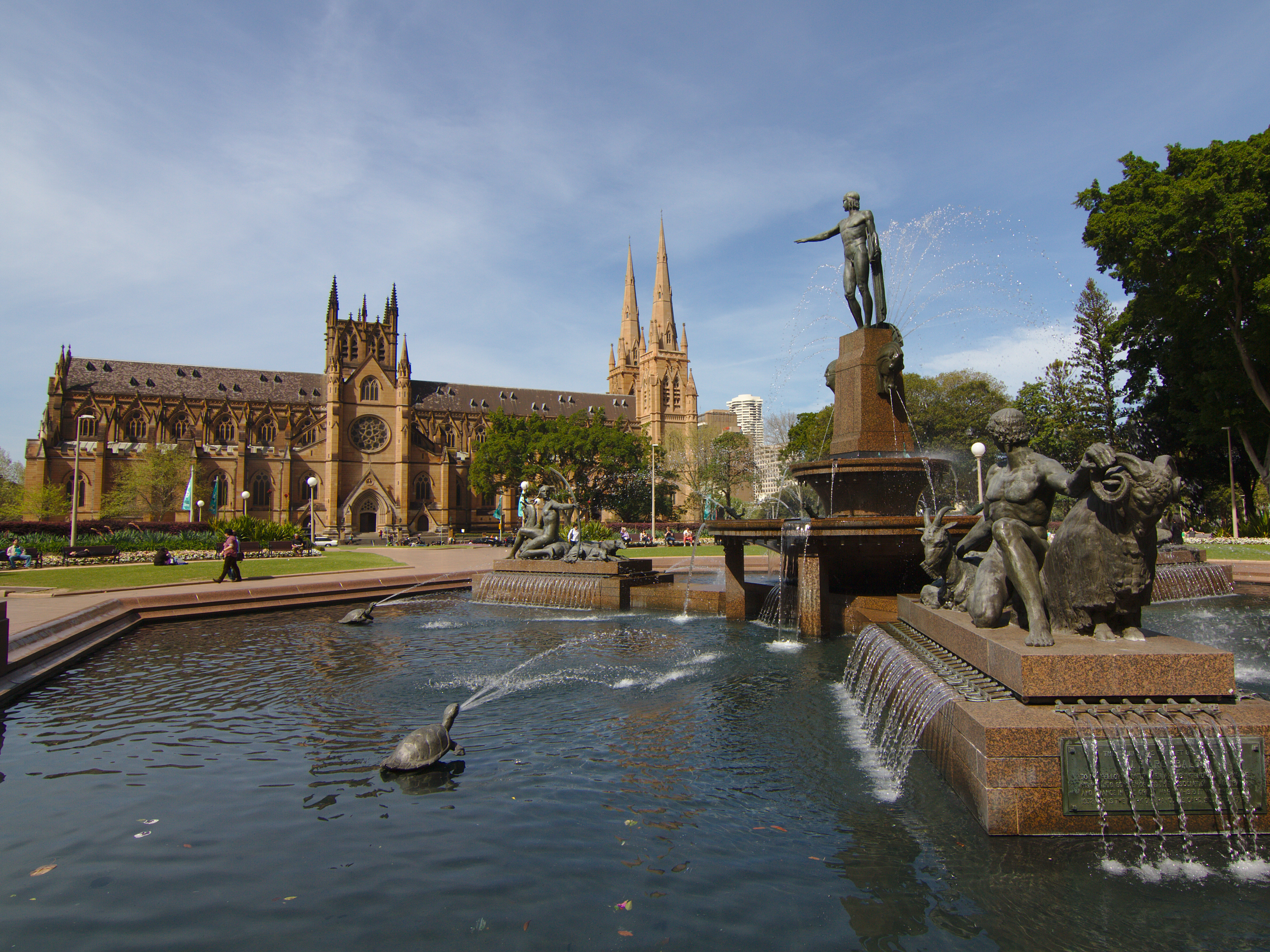
Archibald Fountain

In 1902, Archibald's health broke down and he resigned the editorship, though retaining overall control. Unable to rest, he launched a new monthly magazine, The Lone Hand. But soon afterwards, he had a complete collapse and spent several years in the Callan Park Hospital for the Insane. Even from there, he kept writing, and in 1907 published The Genesis of The Bulletin, an important source for the history of the magazine.

Archibald's health never really recovered, and, in 1914, he sold his interest in The Bulletin. He died in Sydney on 10 September 1919 and is buried in Waverley Cemetery. In his will, he made the two bequests by which he is best remembered by the general public: funds for the Archibald Fountain in Sydney's Hyde Park, which he specified must be designed by a French sculptor, and the Archibald Prize for portraiture, now Australia's most prestigious art prize.
