= National personification =

Fictional character representing a country

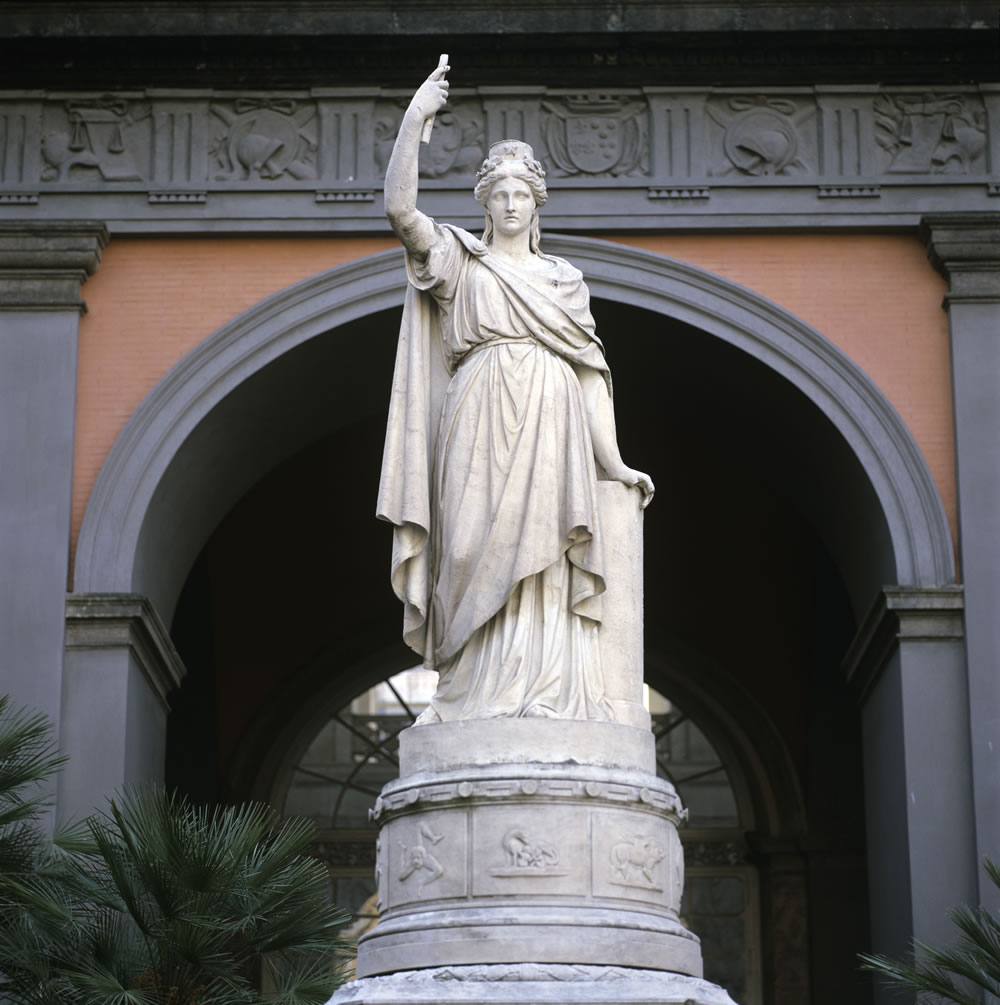
The allegorical personification of Italy (Italia turrita; lit. 'Turreted Italy'), goes back to ancient Rome. The woman is linked to Cybele, an Anatolian fertility goddess.

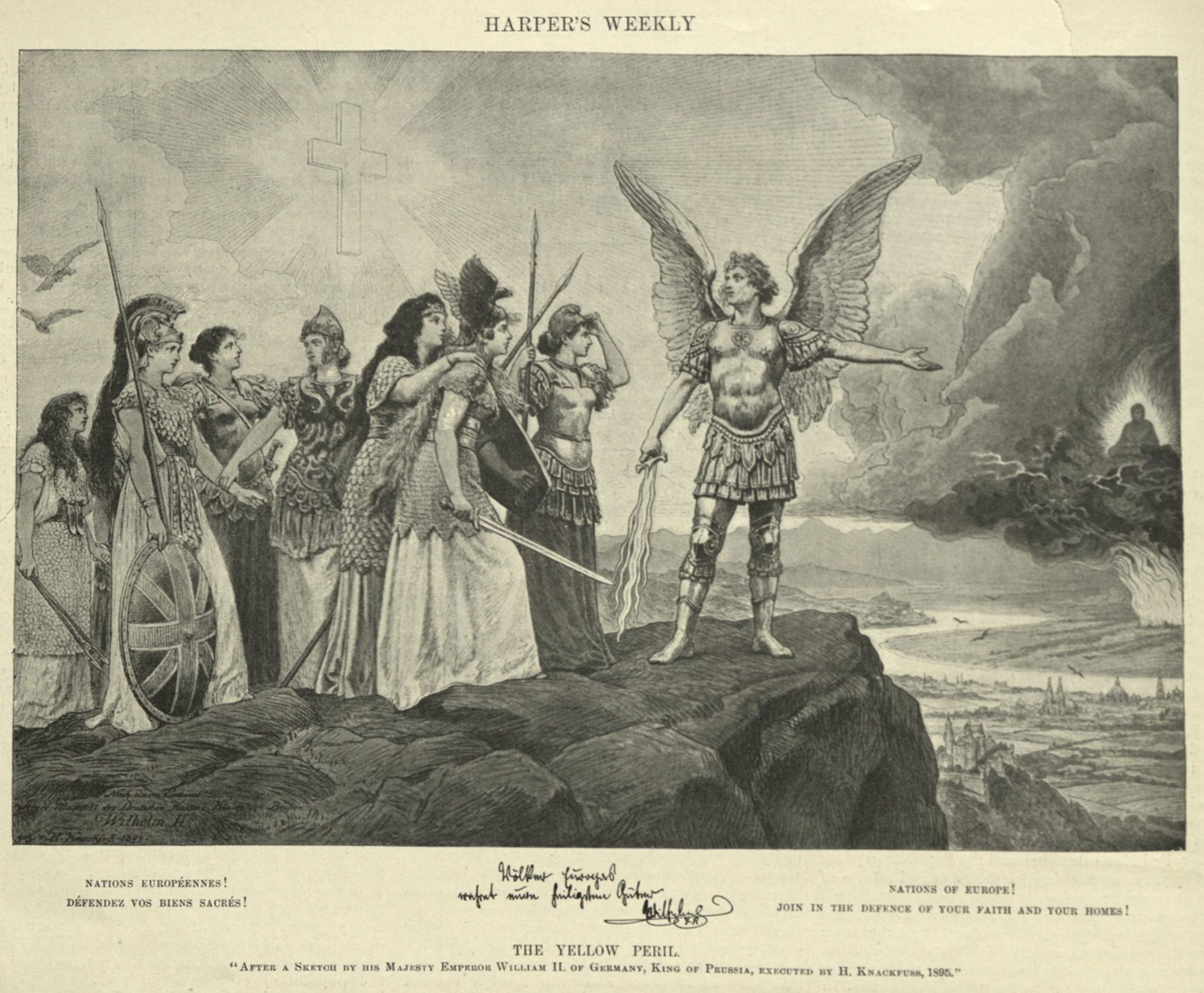
Saint Michael at right, gesturing to, from left: an unspecified figure, Britannia, Italia, Austria, Mother Russia, Germania, and Marianne of France

A national personification is an anthropomorphic personification of a state or the people(s) it inhabits. It may appear in political cartoons and propaganda. In the first personifications in the Western World, warrior deities or figures symbolizing wisdom were used (for example the goddess Athena in ancient Greece), to indicate the strength and power of the nation. Some personifications in the Western world often took the Latin name of the ancient Roman province. Examples of this type include Britannia, Germania, Hibernia, Hispania, Lusitania, Helvetia and Polonia.

Examples of personifications of the Goddess of Liberty include Marianne, the Statue of Liberty (Liberty Enlightening the World), and many examples of United States coinage. Another ancient model was Roma, a female deity who personified the city of Rome and her dominion over the territories of the Roman Empire. Roma was probably favoured by Rome's high-status Imperial representatives abroad, rather than the Roman populace at large. In Rome, the Emperor Hadrian built and dedicated a gigantic temple to her as Roma Aeterna ("Eternal Rome"), and to Venus Felix, ("Venus the Bringer of Good Fortune"), emphasising the sacred, universal and eternal nature of the empire. Examples of representations of the everyman or citizenry in addition to the nation itself are Deutscher Michel, John Bull and Uncle Sam.

Italia turrita (lit. 'Turreted Italy'), the allegorical personification of Italy, appears as of a young woman with her head surrounded by a mural crown completed by towers (hence turrita or "with towers" in Italian). It is often accompanied by the Stella d'Italia ('Star of Italy'), which is the oldest national symbol of Italy, since it dates back to the Graeco-Roman tradition, from which the so-called Italia turrita e stellata ('turreted and starry Italy'), and by other additional attributes, the most common of which is the cornucopia. The allegorical representation with the towers, which draws its origins from ancient Rome, is typical of Italian civic heraldry, so much so that the mural crown is also the symbol of the cities of Italy. The origin of the turreted woman is linked to the figure of Cybele, a deity of fertility of Anatolian origin, in whose representations she wears a wall crown. Its most classic aspect derives from the primordial myth of the Great Mediterranean Mother.

== Gallery ==
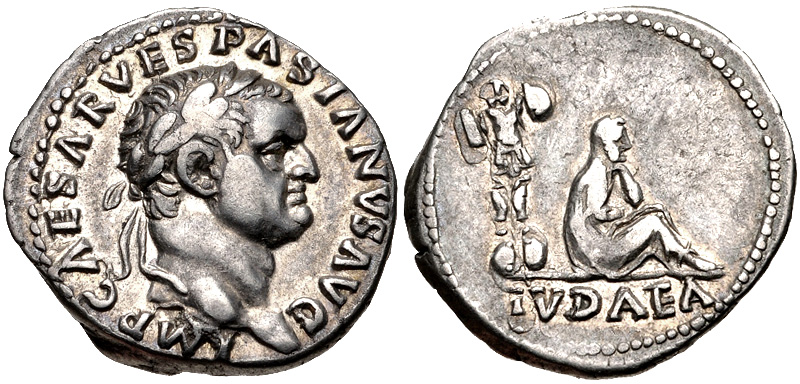
Iudaea Capta, "Judaea Taken", commemorative coin issued by the Roman emperor Vespasian (left) after the Jewish War

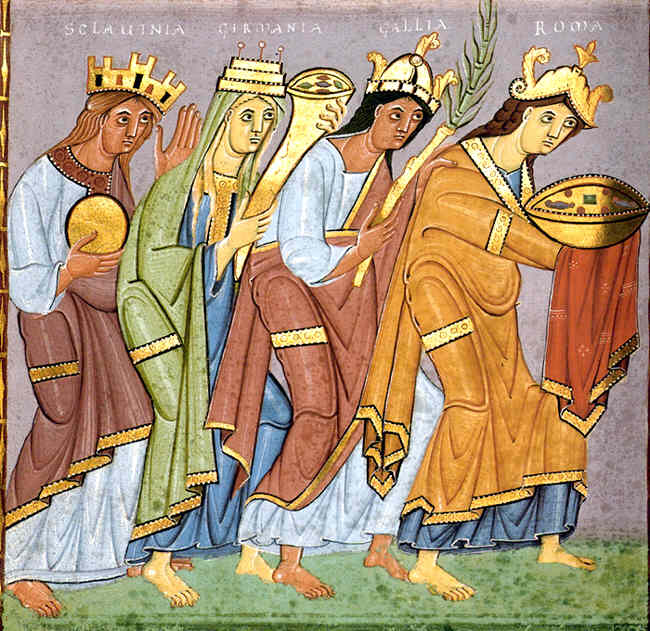
An early example of national personification in the Gospels of Otto III dated 990: Sclavinia, Germania, Gallia, and Roma, bringing offerings to Emperor Otto III.

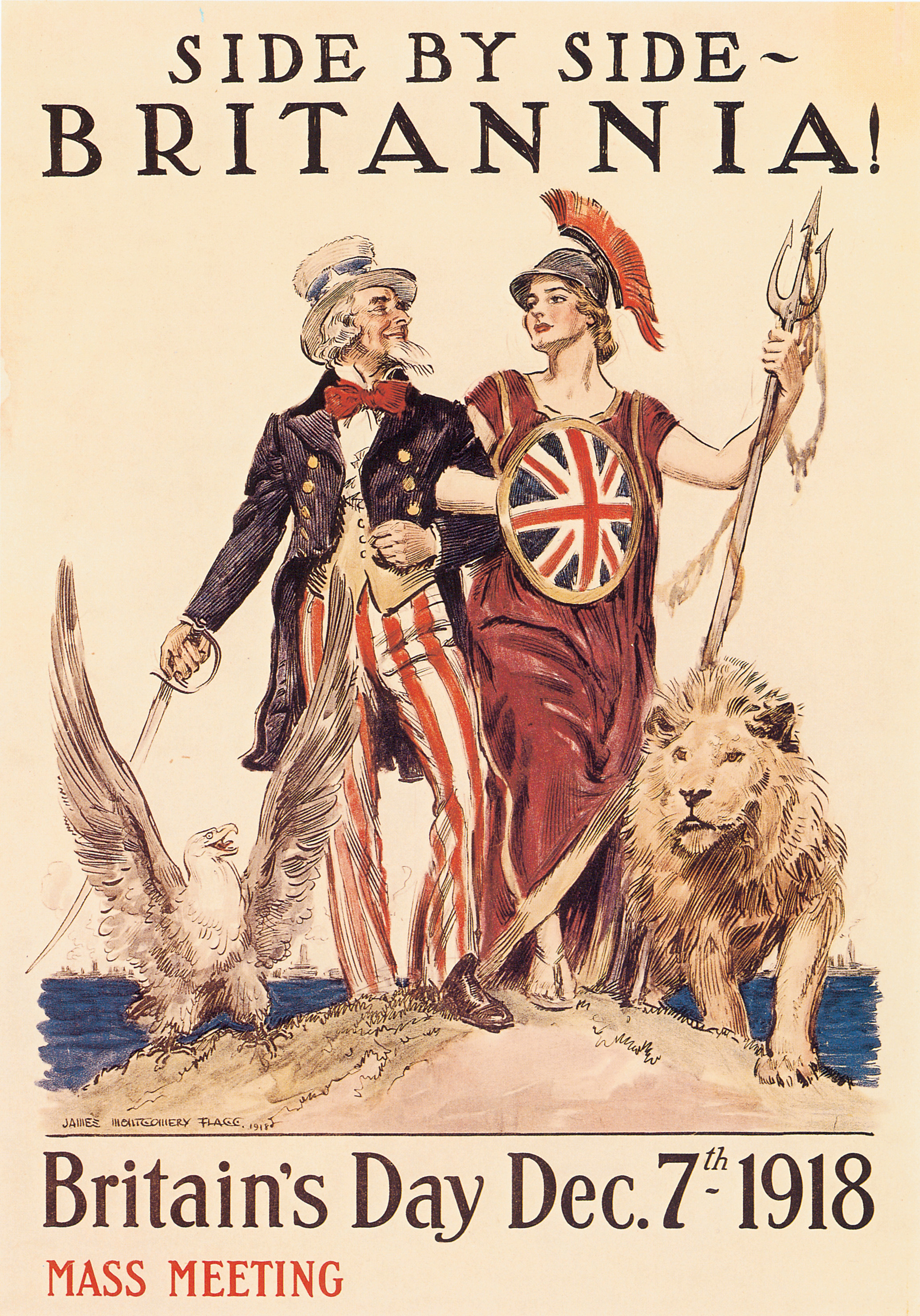
Britannia arm-in-arm with Uncle Sam symbolizes the British-American alliance in World War I. The two animals, the Bald eagle and the Barbary lion, are also national personifications of the two countries.

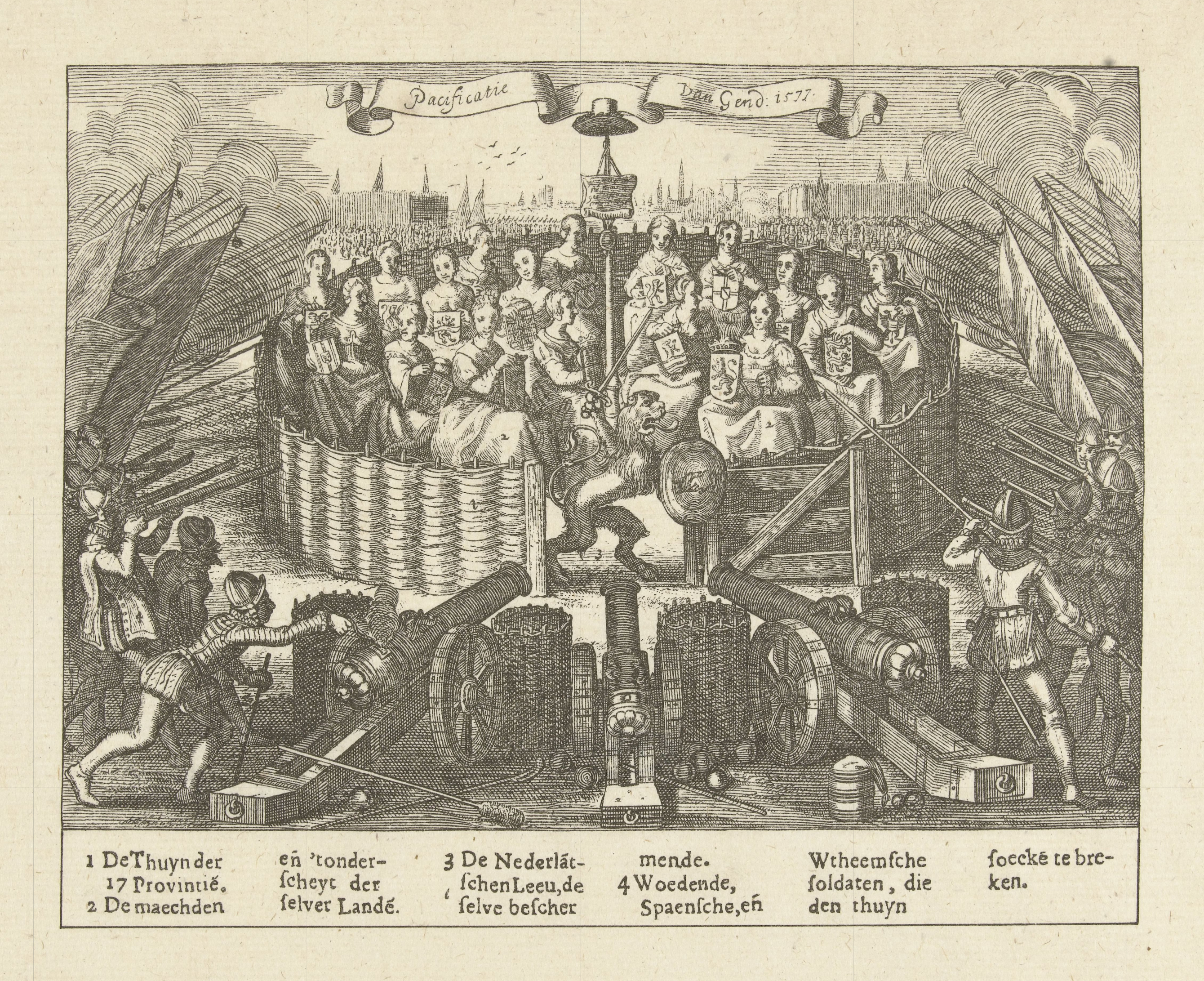
In this Allegory depicting the 1576 Pacification of Ghent by Adriaen Pietersz van de Venne, the seated women represent a short-lived unity among the embattled provinces of what would become the present-day Belgium and Netherlands.

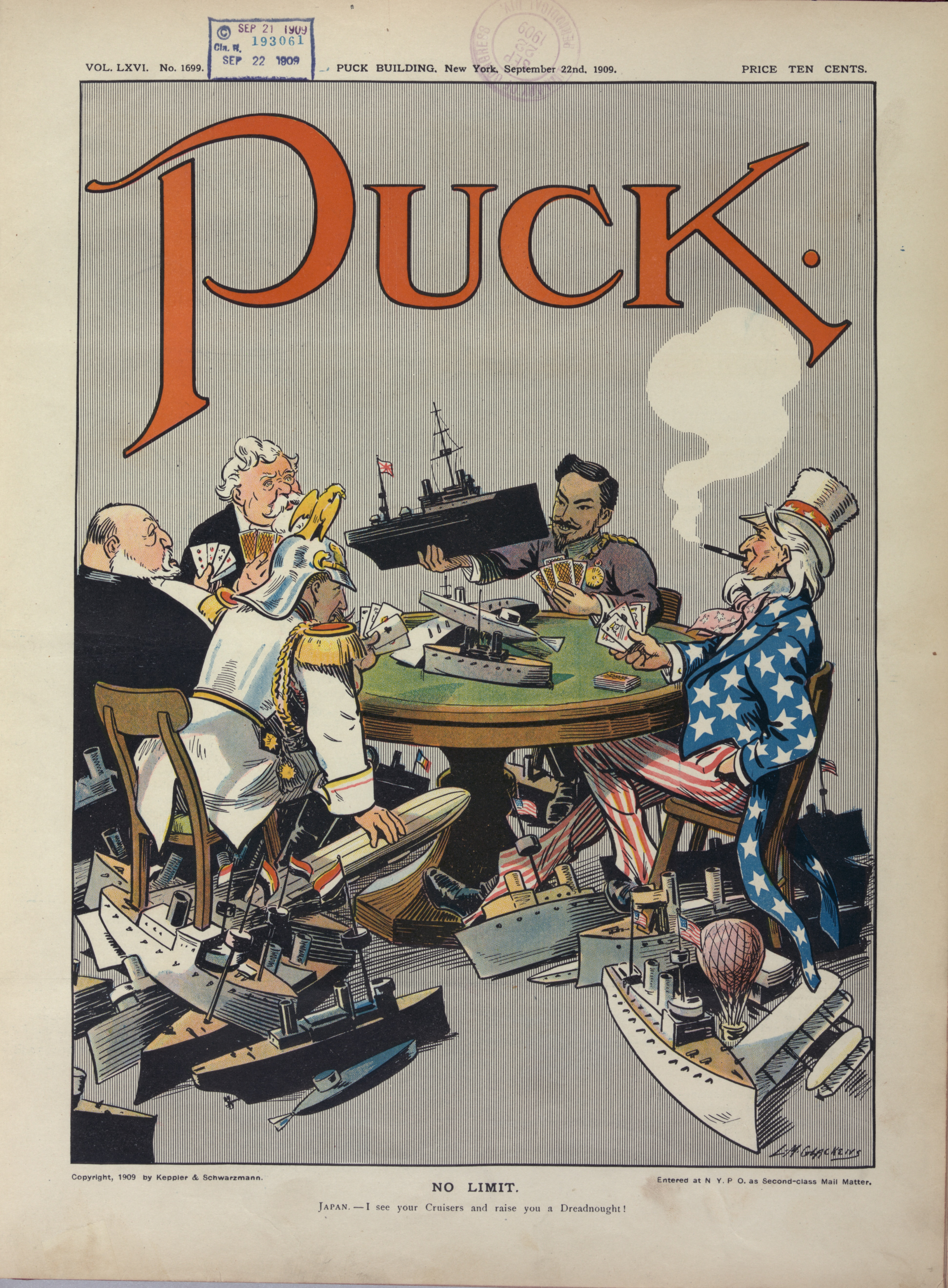
1909 cartoon in Puck shows (clockwise) US, Germany, Britain, France and Japan engaged in naval race in a "no limit" game.

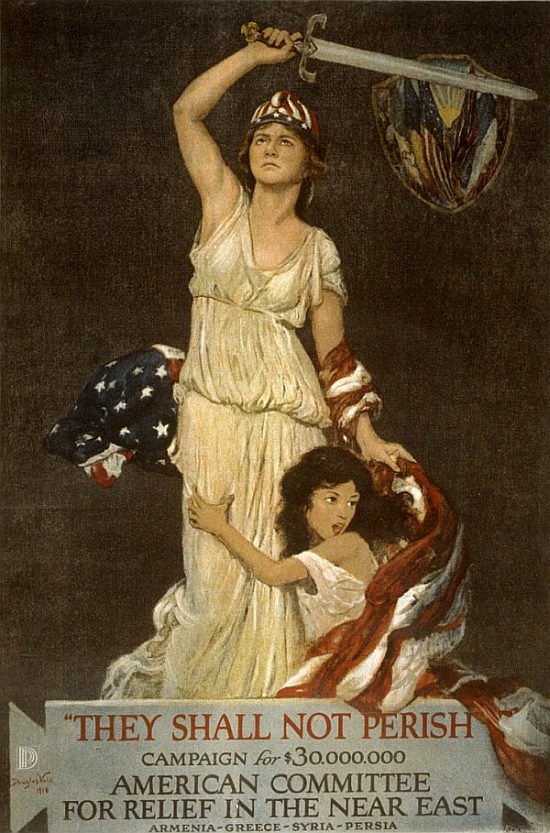
Columbia depicted in an American Committee for Relief in the Near East poster defending an Armenian woman beneath her flag

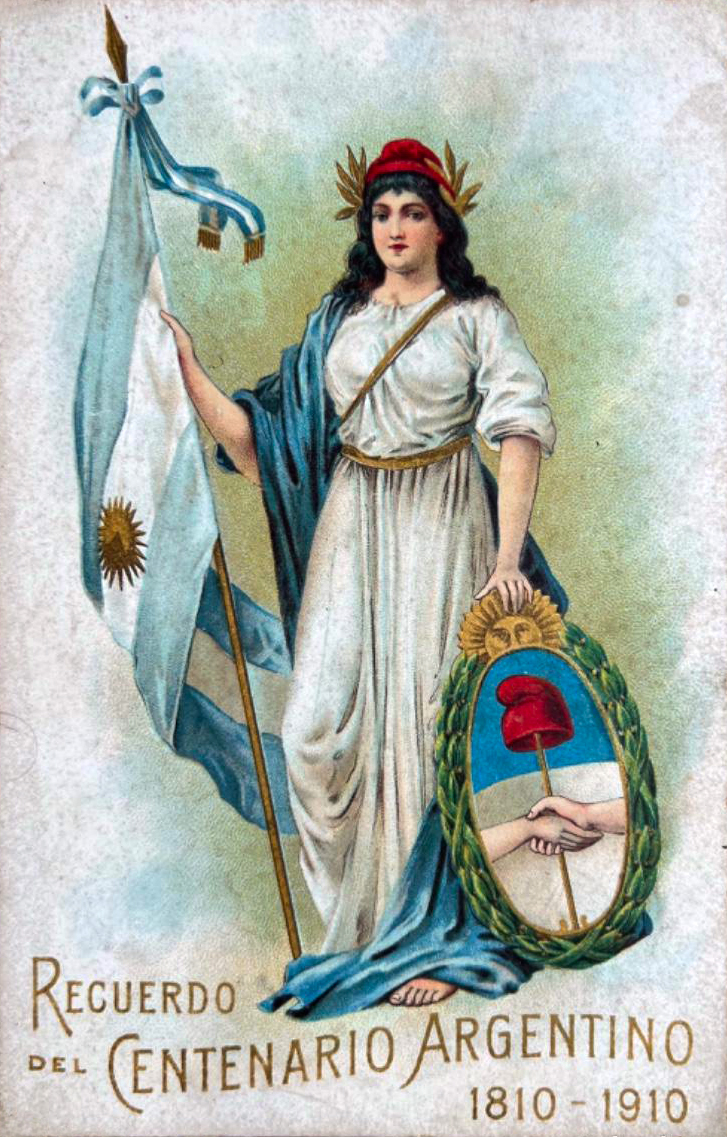
The Liberty of Oudiné in memory of the Argentine centenary of the May Revolution (1810-1910)

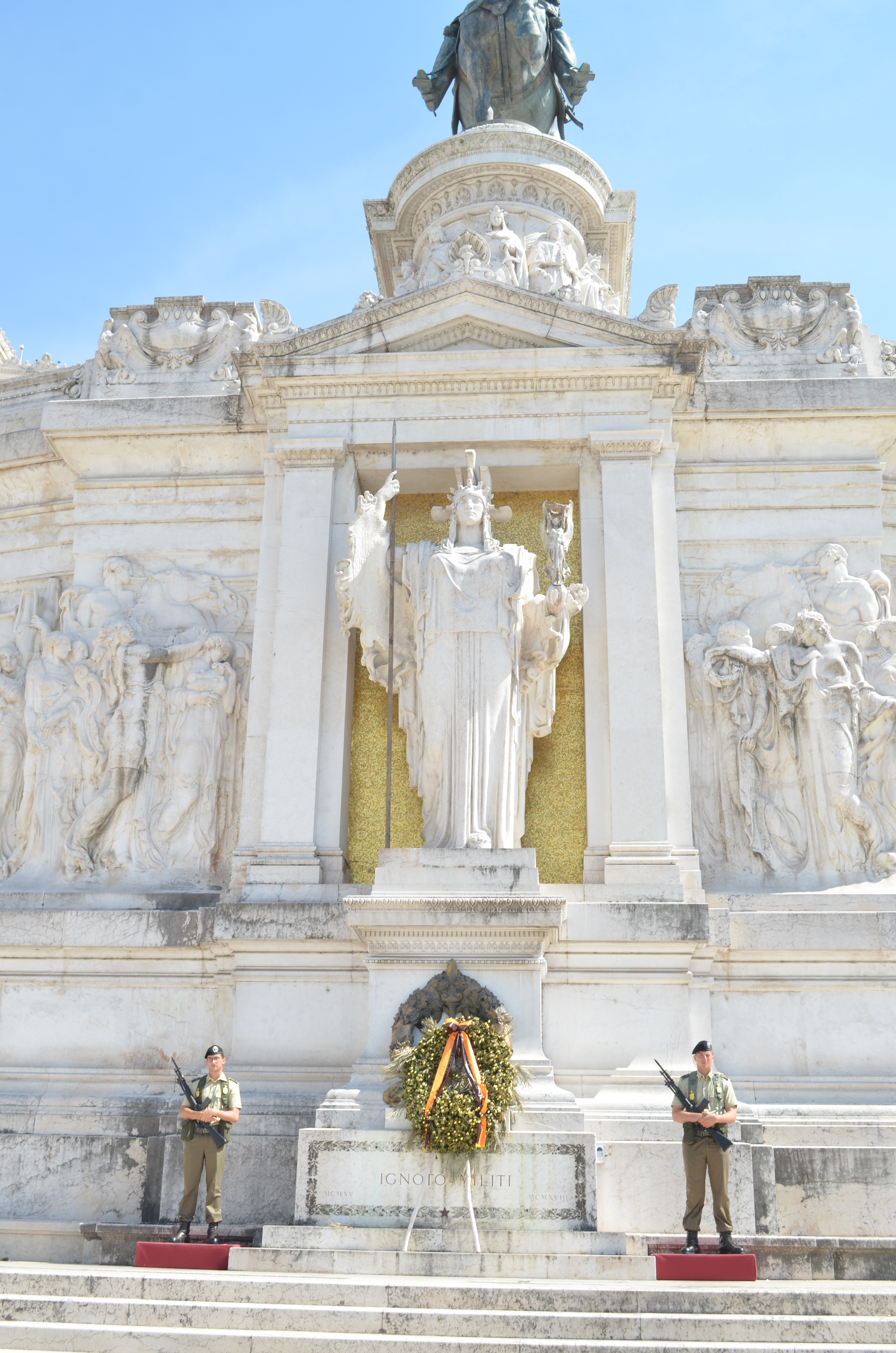
Tomb of the Italian Unknown Soldier, under the statue of goddess Roma, at Altare della Patria, Rome. Above it can be seen the equestrian statue of Victor Emmanuel II of Savoy, the first king of a unified Italy.

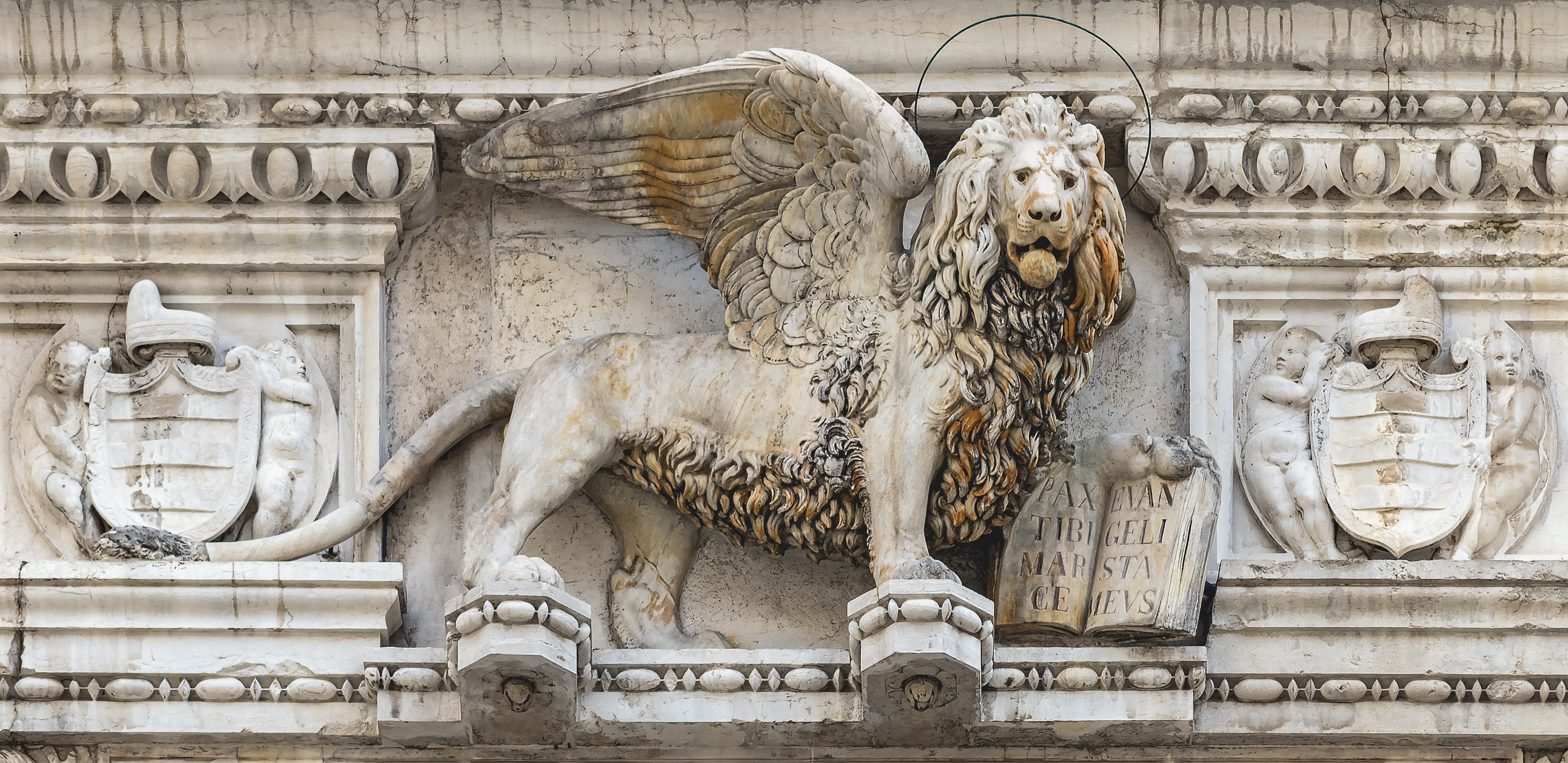
The winged Lion of Saint Mark at the Scuola Grande di San Marco, Venice. The open book holds the legend PAX TIBI MARCE EVANGELISTA MEVS (lit. 'Peace unto you, Mark, my Evangelist').

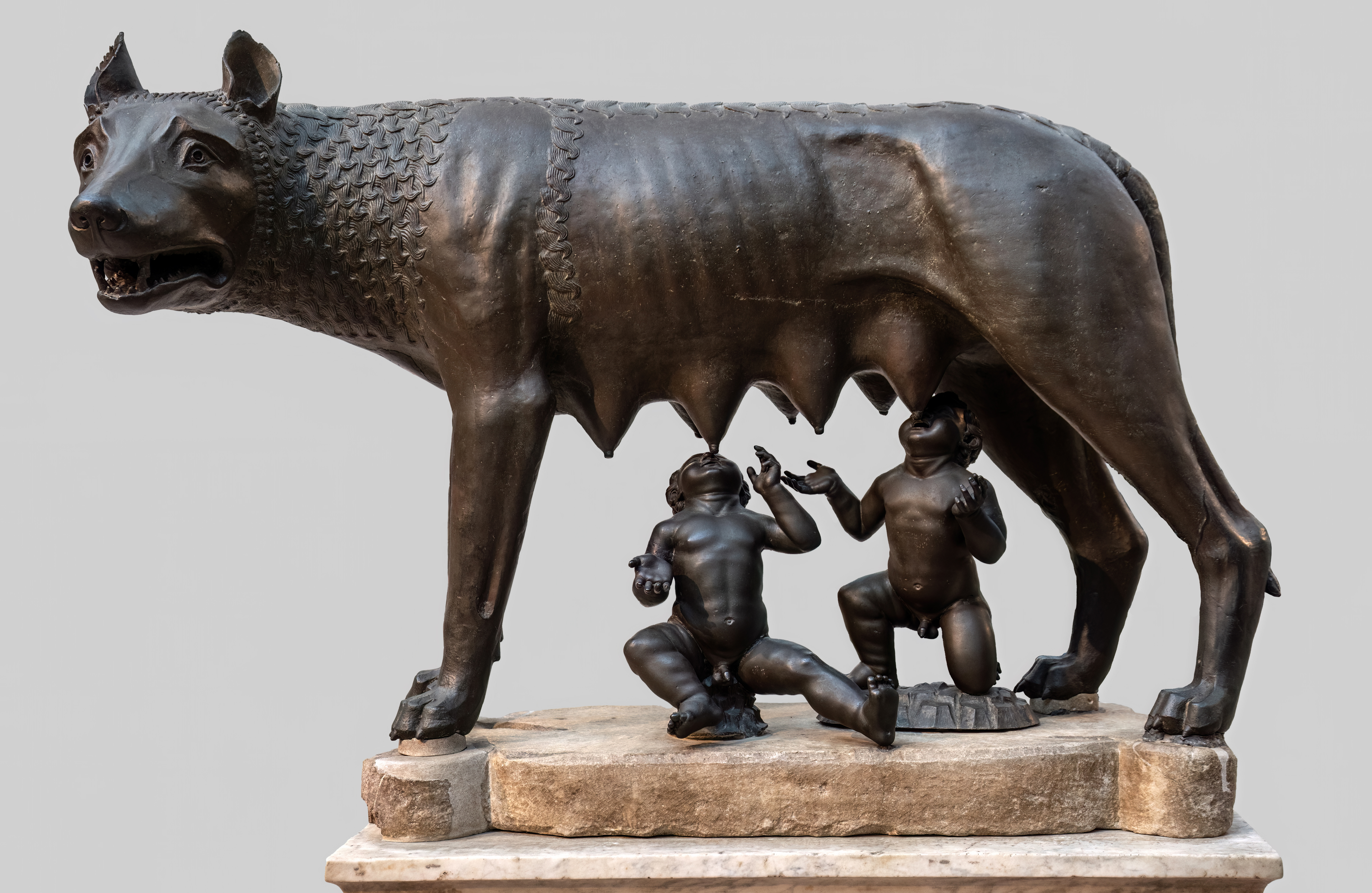
The Capitoline Wolf is a bronze sculpture depicting a scene from the legend of the founding of Rome. The sculpture shows a she-wolf suckling the mythical twin founders of Rome, Romulus and Remus.

== Personifications by country or territory ==
Location	Image	Personification	Animal or plants used for the same purpose
Africa		Africa	African animals
Albania		Mother Albania	Double-headed eagle
Algeria		Sidi hafsan (Libya)	Barbary lion, Fennecs
Libya		Sidi hafsan (Libya)	Barbary lion, Fennecs
Morocco		Sidi hafsan (Libya)	Barbary lion, Fennecs
Tunisia		Sidi hafsan (Libya)	Barbary lion, Fennecs
Americas		Personification of the Americas	American alligator
Argentina		Allegory of the Republic, Gaucho	Hornero
Armenia		Mother Armenia: David of Sassoun; We Are Our Mountains (Artsakh)	
Australia		Digger: Little Boy from Manly (New South Wales); In 19th and early 20th century cartoons, Australia was sometimes personified as a young woman named 'Miss Australia'.	Boxing kangaroo
Austria		Austria: Tyrolia (Tyrol)	Double-headed eagle
Bangladesh		Bangamata	Bengal tiger
Belgium		La Belgique, Manneken Pis	Brabantic Lion, Leo Belgicus
Bolivia		Pachamama	Llama
Brazil		Efígie da República: Native Brazilian allegory (Empire of Brazil, obsolete); Bandeirante (São Paulo); Tropeiro (Minas Gerais); Candango (Brasília); Gaúcho (Rio Grande do Sul); Cangaceiro (Nordeste)	Rufous-bellied Thrush, Jaguar: Wyvern (Empire of Brazil, obsolete); Jabiru (Pantanal); Harpy Eagle (Parana)
Brunei		Awang Budiman	
Bulgaria		Mother Bulgaria	Lion
Cambodia		Preah Thong and Neang Neak	
Canada		Mountie, Johnny Canuck, Canada Bereft (Vimy Memorial).: Le Vieux de '37 (Quebec); Canada was often personified as a young woman in 19th and early 20th century editorial cartoons, called simply "Canada", "Miss Canada", or sometimes "Mother Canada".	Canadian beaver: Snowy owl (Quebec)
Chile		Huaso, Señora Juanita: Roto (contentious); Angel of Liberty (Dictatorship, obsolete)	Condorito
China			Chinese dragon, Panda, hare: Snow lion (Tibet)
Colombia		Juan Valdez	Andean condor
Croatia		Mother Croatia	Beech marten (kuna)
Cuba		La República	Tocororo
Cyprus		Liberty	Cypriot Mouflon
Czechia		Čechie, Czech Vašek, Honza, Svejk	Czech lion
Denmark		Holger Danske, Mother Denmark	Mute swan: Polar bear (Greenland)
Dominican Republic		Conchoprimo	
Egypt		Egypt's Renaissance	Sphinx
El Salvador		Salvador del Mundo	Torogoz
Estonia		Kalevipoeg	
Europe		Europa or Europa regina	
Finland		Finnish Maiden	Finnish lion
France		Marianne: Tiki (French Polynesia)	Gallic rooster: Manta ray (French Polynesia)
Georgia		Mother of Kartvel	
Germany		Germania, Deutscher Michel: Bavaria (Bavaria); Berolina (Berlin); Brema (Bremen); Brunonia (Brunswick Land); Franconia (Franconia); Francofurtia (Frankfurt); Hammonia (Hamburg); Lubeca (Lübeck); Borussia (Prussia); Palatia (Rhineland-Palatinate); Saxonia (Saxony); Vimaria (Weimar); Württembergia (Württemberg)	Reichsadler, Bundesadler, Berliner Bär (Berlin); Bavarian Lion (Bavaria); Marcher Eagle (Brandenburg); Prussian Eagle (Prussia)
Greece		Hellas: Athena (Athens)	
Haiti		Ezili Dantor, Le Marron Inconnu, Katrin	
Hungary		The Lady of Hungaria: Prince Csaba (Székely Land)	Turul
Iceland		The Lady of the Mountains	Gyrfalcon
India		Bharat Mata: Banga Mata (West Bengal); Kangleipak Ima (Manipur); Tamil Thai (Tamil Nadu); Telangana Thalli (Telangana); Telugu Thalli (Andhra Pradesh); Utkala Janani (Odisha)	Bengal tiger, Asiatic lion, Indian Elephant, Indian peafowl: Pākhangbā (Manipur)
Indonesia		Ibu Pertiwi (Mother Prithvi)	Garuda Pancasila
Iran		Rostam	Lion and sun
Afghanistan		Rostam	Lion and sun
Tajikistan		Rostam	Lion and sun
Ireland		Ériu, Banba, Fódla, Kathleen Ni Houlihan, Hibernia, The Old Woman of Beare	Irish Hare
(Haudenosaunee) Iroquoia		Hiawatha	Beaver
Israel		Daughter of Zion, Srulik	Lion of Judah
Italy		Italia turrita: Roma (Rome); Venezia trionfante (Venice)	Italian wolf: Aquila (Roman Empire); Capitoline Wolf (Rome); Lion of Saint Mark (Venice)
Japan		Yamato-hime, Samurai	Green Pheasant
Kazakhstan		Altin Adam	Tulpar
North Korea			Korean Tiger
South Korea			Korean Tiger
Kyrgyzstan		Manas	Siberian ibex
Latvia		Latvian Maiden, Liberty, Lāčplēsis	
Lebanon			Cedrus
Lithuania		Vytis, Lithuania	White Stallion
Low Lands or Benelux			Leo Belgicus
Malaysia		Hang Tuah	Malayan tiger
Malta		Melita	Dolphin
Mauritius			Dodo
Mexico		Mexican Motherland, La China Poblana: Eagle and Jaguar warriors (Aztec Empire)	Golden eagle, Jaguar, Chihuahueño
Mongolia		Genghis Khan	Mongolian horse, Saker falcon
Montenegro		Fairy of Lovćen, Mother Montenegro	Double-headed eagle
Netherlands		Dutch Maiden: Dutch sailor (Holland)	Dutch Republic Lion, Leo Belgicus
Nepal		Gurkha, Sherpa	Yeti
New Zealand		Zealandia: Māui (Māori); Southern man (South Island)	Kiwi
Nicaragua		El Güegüense	Motmot
North Macedonia		Mother Macedonia	Lioness
Norway		Mother Norway, Ola & Kari Nordmann, Nór	Norwegian lion
Palestine		Handala	Eagle of Saladin
Panama		Mother of Panama	Jaguar
Peru		Peruvian Motherland, El Perú Libre: Sapa Inca (Inca Empire)	Vicuña
Philippines		La Madre Filipinas, Juan dela Cruz	Philippine Carabao
Poland		Polonia	White eagle
Portugal		Zé Povinho, Efígie da República, Guardian Angel of Portugal	Rooster of Barcelos
Rhodesia		Cecil Rhodes	Sable antelope, Zimbabwe Bird
Romania		România	Lynx
Russia		Mother Russia, General Winter: Mother Buryatia (Buryatia)	Russian bear
San Marino		Liberty	
Serbia		Mother Serbia, Kosovo Maiden	Serbian eagle
Singapore			Merlion
Slovakia		Jánošík	
Slovenia		Kralj Matjaž	
South Africa		The Lady of Good Hope (Die Dame van Goeie Hoop or INkosikazi Yethemba Elihle): Adamastor (Cape of Good Hope); Voortrekker (Afrikaners); Boer Woman (Orange Free State, obsolete); Oom Paul (Transvaal, obsolete); Shaka (Zululand, obsolete)	Springbok: Lion (Transvaal, obsolete)
Spain		Hispania: El Cid (Castile and León); Breogán (Galicia); Matrona Foral (Navarre)	Hispanic Lion, Spanish Fighting Bull
Sri Lanka		Sri Lanka Matha (Mother Sri Lanka)	Lion
Suriname		Mama Sranan (Mother Suriname), a 1965 sculpture by Jozeph Klas in the center of Paramaribo, of a mother figure holding five children representing Suriname's ethnic groups in her arms.	
Sweden		Mother Svea (Moder Svea)	
Switzerland		Helvetia: Basilea (Basel); Berna (Bern); Geneva (Geneva); Tigurina Virgo (Zürich); Lucerna (Lucerne)	Cow
Taiwan			Formosan black bear
Thailand		Siam Devadhiraj	White elephant
Turkey		Mehmetçik	Wolf
Turkmenistan		Oghuz Khagan	Akhal-Teke
Ukraine		Cossack Mamay, Mother Ukraine, Berehynia	Ruthenian Lion
United Kingdom		None for the entire United Kingdom (including Northern Ireland): Britannia (Great Britain); John Bull (England); Scota (Scotland); Dame Wales (Wales)	Bulldog: The Lion and the Unicorn (England and Scotland); Welsh dragon (Wales); Manx cat (Mann)
United States		Columbia, Lady Liberty: The Minuteman (American Revolution); Uncle Sam (federal government); Brother Jonathan (New England); Overmountain Men (Appalachians); Evangeline (Cajuns); Kamehameha (Hawaii); The Lady of the Alamo (Texas, obsolete); Billy Yank (The North, obsolete); Johnny Reb (The South, obsolete)	Bald Eagle, American Buffalo: Timber rattlesnake (American Revolution)
Uruguay		Efigie de la República	
Uzbekistan		Timur	Snow leopard, Huma bird
Venezuela		María Lionza, Juan Bimba (obsolete)	
Vietnam		Lạc Long Quân and Âu Cơ	Vietnamese Dragon, Lạc Bird
Zimbabwe			Zimbabwe Bird

== See also ==
- Mural crown
- National animal, often personifies a nation in cartoons.
- National emblem, for other metaphors for nations.
- National god, a deity that embodies a nation.
- National patron saint, a Saint that is regarded as the heavenly advocate of a nation.
- Contemporary pop cultural
  - Afghanis-tan, a manga originally published as a webcomic about Central Asia with personified countries.
  - Polandball, a contemporary form of national personification in which countries are drawn by Internet users as stereotypic balls and shared as comics on online communities.
  - Hetalia: Axis Powers, a manga and anime about personified countries interacting.
  - Year Hare Affair
  - Brazilian Miku
