= Hungaria =

Hungaria or Hungária may refer to:

- Latin or alternative name for Hungary, a European country
  - For historical entities (from 895) see: Hungary (disambiguation)
- Lady of Hungaria, the national personification of Hungary
- Hungaria (Liszt), a symphonic poem by Franz Liszt
- Hungaria, a song by gypsy jazz guitarist Django Reinhardt
- Hungaria (train), an express train between Budapest and Berlin
- Hungária, a pop-rock music group from Hungary
- Hungária körgyűrű, the longest boulevard in Budapest, Hungary
- Hungária körút, part of Hungária körgyűrű
- MTK Hungária, Hungarian football club
- Hungaria, a former New Zealand association football team, now part of Wellington United
- 434 Hungaria, an asteroid
- Hungaria group, a group of asteroids named after 434 Hungaria
