= Bimba =

Bimba or BIMBA may refer to:

== People ==
- Anthony Bimba (1894-1982), Lithuanian-American radical journalist and historian
- Bhima of Mahikavati, 13th century Indian king, also known as Bimba Shah
- Manuel dos Reis Machado (1899-1984), Brazilian martial artist
- Ricardo Winicki, Brazilian sailor at the 2007 Pan American Games

== Other uses ==
- Beijing International MBA at Peking University (BiMBA), a Peking University business school
- Juan Bimba, a fictional personification of Venezuela
- bimba fruit, Coccinia grandis
- Yaśodharā, also Bimba Devi in Buddhist texts, the wife of Gautama Buddha
- Bimba Devi Alias Yashodhara, a 2018 Sri Lankan film about Yaśodharā
