= Čechie =

Personification of the Czech nation

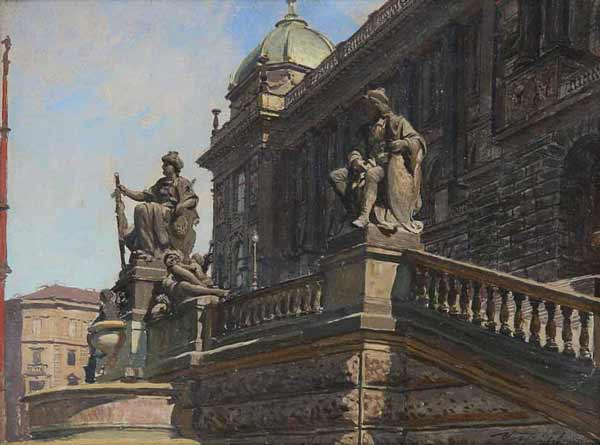
Statue of Čechie in front of the National Museum (Prague)

Čechie is the personification of the Czech nation, which was used in the 19th century as reaction on personification of competing nationalism represented by Germania or Austria.

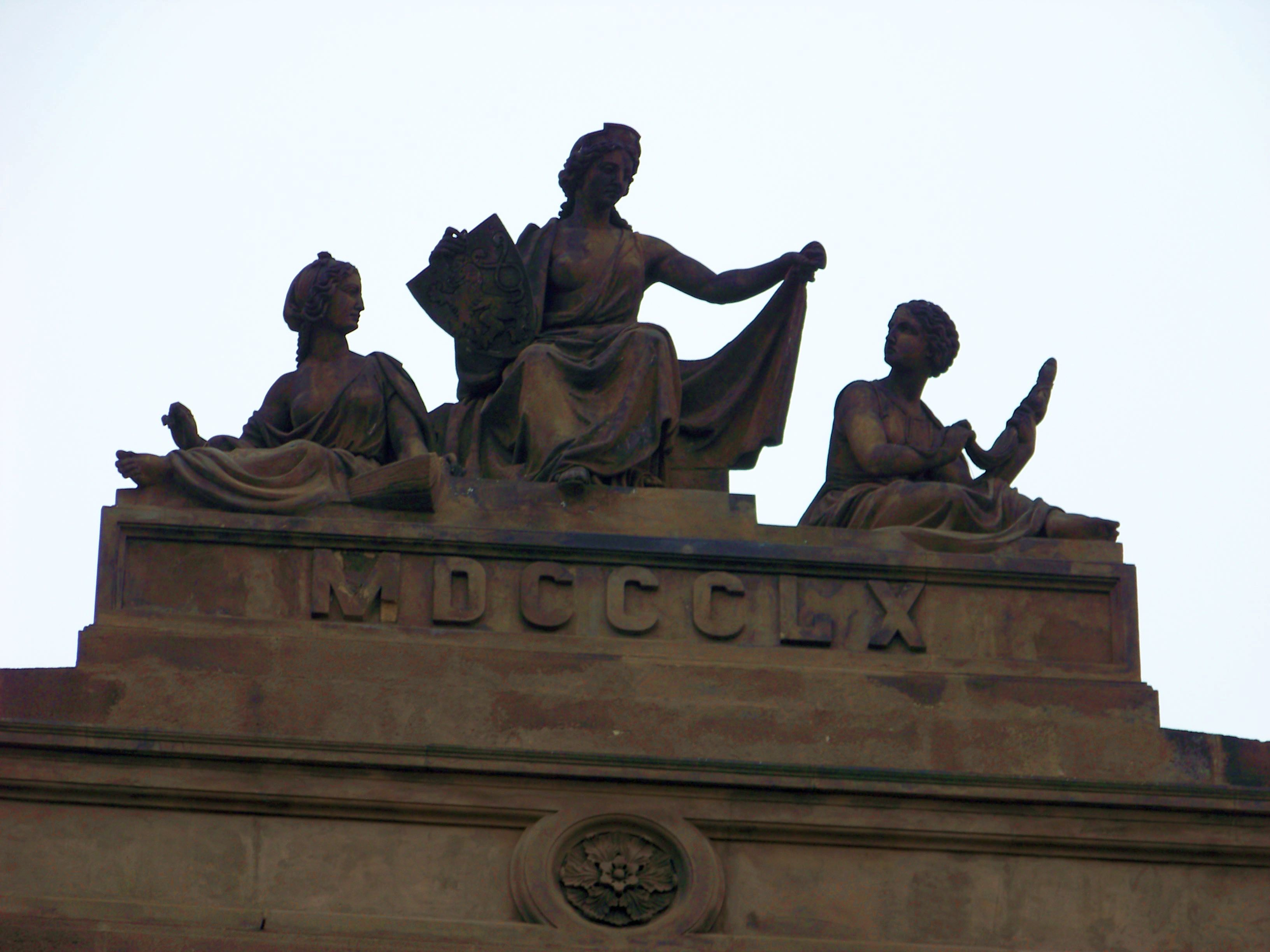
Čechie receiving savings of the people, 1861. Statue at the former Bohemian Saving Bank, currently the seat of the Czech Academy of Sciences

== See also ==
- Flag and Coat of arms of the Czech Republic
- Czech Vašek, personification of the Czechs
- Deutscher Michel, personification of the German people
