= Little Boy from Manly =

National personification of Australia

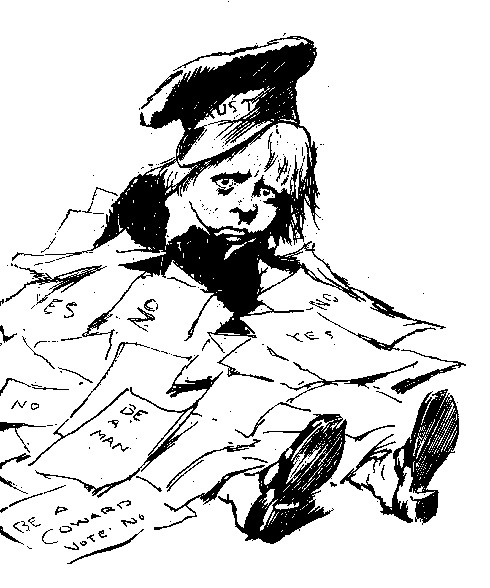
'The Little Boy from Manly', drawn by Norman Lindsay during the 1916 Conscription Referendum

The Little Boy from Manly was a national personification of the colony of New South Wales and later of Australia, initially created by the cartoonist Livingston Hopkins of The Bulletin in April 1885. Hopkins' creative imagination produced an enduring image that evolved to symbolise and personify the colony of New South Wales and, in later years, a figurative representation of the Australian nation as a whole.

== Conception ==
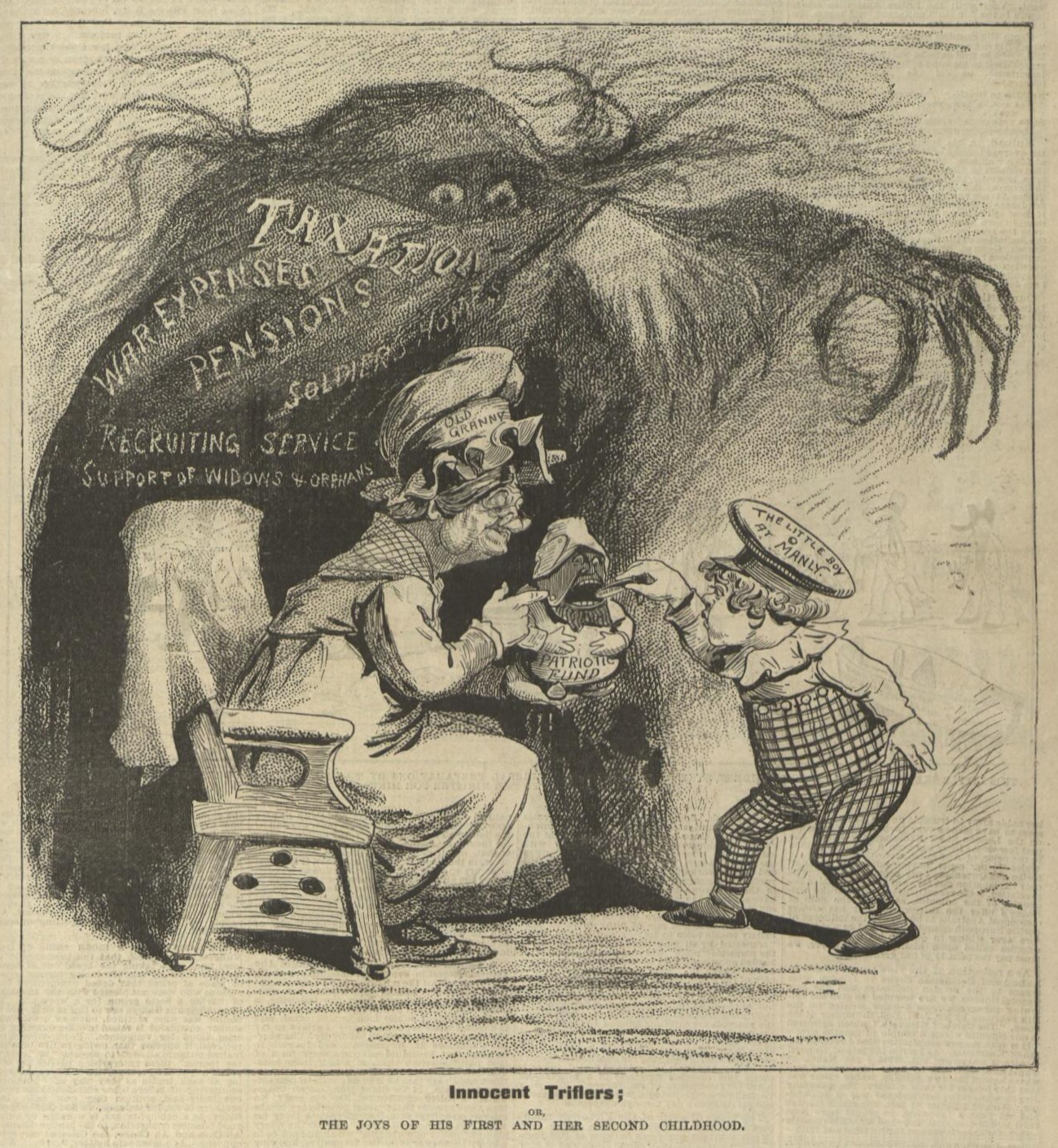
'Innocent Triflers' (The Bulletin, 4 April 1885).

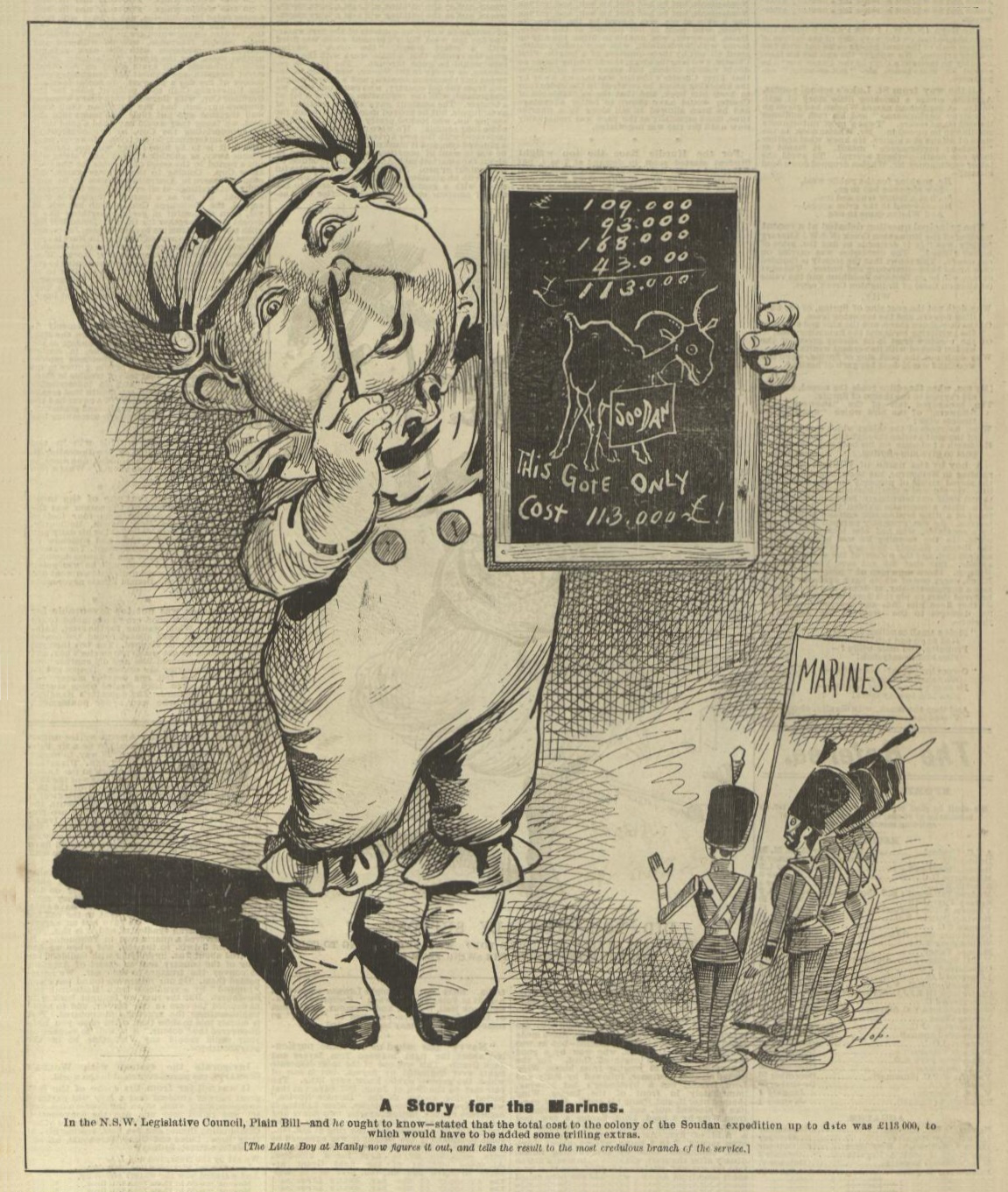
'A Story for the Marines' (The Bulletin, 26 September 1885).

Early images by Livingston Hopkins of 'The Little Boy from Manly'

In February 1885 William Bede Dalley, acting premier of the colony of New South Wales, offered to send a detachment of troops to the Sudan to support British forces in the suppression of the Mahdist uprising. After the British acceptance of Dalley's offer, a wave of patriotic enthusiasm became evident and a fund was established to receive public contributions, both monetary and in kind, in support of the expedition. However support for the enterprise was not universal, particularly in working-class suburbs and rural districts. Sydney's Bulletin magazine responded cynically to Dalley's offer of colonial troops, describing it as having "a suspicious resemblance to a feat of political legerdemain".

On 4 March 1885, the day after the troops departed from Sydney "amid much public fanfare", 10-year-old Ernest Lawrence wrote to Dalley enclosing the sum of £25 from his savings (plus a contribution from his father) "with my best wishes from a little boy at Manly". Ernest's father was a partner in the legal firm of Stephen, Lawrence and Jaques. In his accompanying letter Ernest wrote that he had watched "the steamers go through the Heads" and longed to be with the departing troops "and help to punish the wicked Arabs who killed General Gordon". The young boy's contribution received wide publicity, with his letter and Dalley's reply being published in the Sydney Morning Herald and other newspapers.^{[A]}

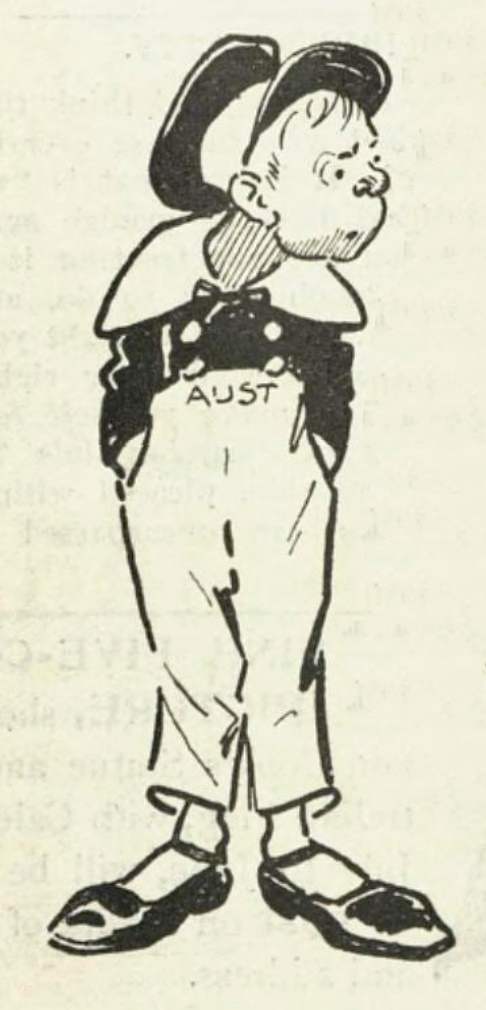
'The Little Boy from Manly' as a representation of Australia; cartoon by David Low (The Bulletin, 14 March 1912).

The initial response in The Bulletin to the publicity surrounding Ernest Lawrence's contribution and letter was the publication of a satirical poem titled 'Nemesis; or, "The Little Boy From Manly"' on a page with a cartoon mocking the cost of sending the contingent of troops to Sudan. On 4 April 1885, a month after the departure of the troops, a cartoon by Livingston Hopkins titled 'Innocent Triflers; or, the Joys of His First and Her Second Childhood' was published in The Bulletin, featuring a representation of 'The Little Boy at Manly'. The cartoon depicted the boy making a contribution to a devouring money-box labelled "Patriotic Fund", held by 'Old Granny', while a spectral figure looms in the background with labels including "War Expenses", "Pensions", "Soldiers' Homes" and "Support of Widows & Orphans". Hopkins illustrated 'The Little Boy at Manly' as a young lad in early-Victorian costume in the style of English storybook schoolboys, wearing high-waisted pantaloons, a shirt with a frilled collar and a flat peaked cap.

The New South Wales Contingent arrived at Suakin on the Red Sea in late March (the first overseas deployment of a military force by an Australian colony). During their short period in Sudan the Australians were involved in only minor skirmishes with the enemy, as well as guard duties and working on the construction of a railway. Casualties were few, though fatalities occurred from disease. The New South Wales contingent departed from Sudan in mid-May and arrived back in Sydney on 19 June 1885. The official reception for the New South Wales Contingent was held on 23 June 1885, greeted by "thousands of people" at Circular Quay including the colonial governor Lord Augustus Loftus.

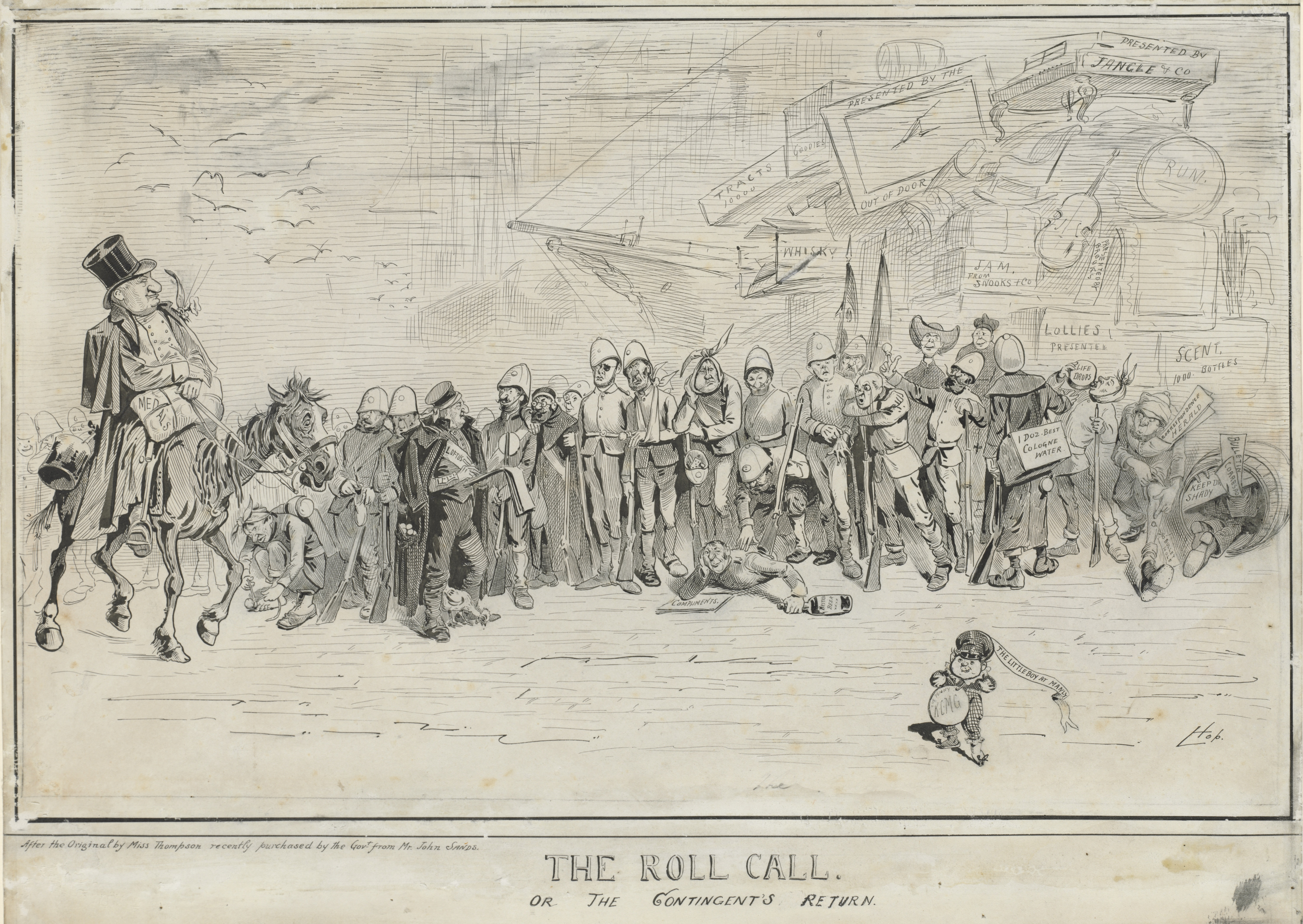
Hopkins' original artwork for 'The Roll-Call. – The Return of the N.S.W. Contingent' (June 1885).

Hopkins produced a major illustration on the occasion of the return of the New South Wales troops from Sudan, consistent with the general attitude of skepticism about the enterprise given coverage in publications such as The Bulletin. Hopkins' drawing was titled 'The Roll-Call. – The Return of the N.S.W. Contingent'. It was included as a supplement to The Bulletin issue of 20 June 1885 (a day after the troops arrived in Sydney) and as a full-page illustration in the magazine the following week. Hopkins' parodic illustration was inspired in its composition by another contemporary event, the purchase by the National Art Gallery of New South Wales of a copy of The Roll Call, Elizabeth Thompson's revered Crimean War painting.^{[B]} Hopkins' version of 'The Roll Call', depicting William Bede Dalley on horseback reviewing the troops on the dock, satirises the "futility of the expedition" and incorporates numerous details intended to "deflate the heroism of the cause". A drunken soldier falls from the line as Governor Loftus, as Dalley's adjutant (and a known poultry fancier), calls the roll with eggs in his pocket and a hen between his feet. Injuries to the troops include a bandaged toe and finger, while the Herald correspondent points to a bullet hole in his leg. In the background the transport vessel is laden with public contributions, including a grand piano and a cello, a barrel of rum and crates of whiskey, jam, lollies and scent. In the foreground a large K.C.M.G. medal hangs from the neck of 'The Little Boy at Manly'.

Hopkins later described how, in his early years at The Bulletin, there was "a vacancy... for a myth that was willing to make itself generally useful" as a "personification of Australia". He described 'The Little Boy at Manly' figure as typifying "the well-meant impetuosity of a young colony in espousing a cause that was well able to take care of itself". Hopkins continued to occasionally use the image in his cartoons and in time 'The Little Boy at Manly' "got promoted to the position of office myth, which he seemed to grow into naturally, and so filled a long-felt want".

== Pre-Federation ==
In the following decades 'The Little Boy from Manly' became a routinely used symbol in The Bulletin of both the colony of New South Wales and Australia's emerging nationhood, featured in illustrations by Livingston Hopkins as well as other artists. A cartoon in The Bulletin by Phil May in February 1888 depicts the little boy as 'Young New South Wales', expressing his disapproval of the intense colonial rivalry between New South Wales and Victoria and focussing on recent comments by the retired politician and opponent of federation, Sir John Robertson.

A full-page illustration by Hopkins, published in July 1889, represents the 'Little Boy' as Australia (more than a decade before Federation). The cartoon, titled 'The Divine Right to Bleed (An Object Lesson for Young Australia)', depicts an aged and decrepit Britannia with a vampire bat (labelled "Royal doweries") attached to her arm. With Hopkins' illustration equating blood and money, Britannia remarks to the boy: "It is a rather pleasant sensation when you get used to it, as you will find when you come to share in the 'glories of Empire'".

When Henry Parkes died in April 1896 Hopkins produced a full-page cover illustration for The Bulletin of a weeping 'Little Boy from Manly' before a large volume labelled 'Parkes'. The veteran New South Wales politician had been an energetic proponent of the federation of the six colonies of Australia, a cause consistently promoted in the pages of The Bulletin.

== After Federation ==
In December 1913 the character 'The Little Boy from Manly', representing Australia, featured in the revue Come Over Here. The character, also referred to as 'Young Australia', was played by the female child actress, Baby Cremer. The revue opened at Her Majesty's Theatre in Sydney on 20 December 1913 and was performed over the holiday season.

From about 1916 the Sydney-based company, Meggitt Limited, manufacturers of linseed oil, linseed meal and stock foods from their Parramatta factory, began to incorporate images of 'The Little Boy from Manly' in their advertisements, drawn by the artist David Low.^{[C]} Low produced a large number of cartoon images for the company's advertisements. By the early 1920s illustrations for the Meggitt Ltd. advertisements were being produced by Syd Nicholls.

During the 1920s Bulletin artists continued to use 'The Little Boy' images as representations of a young Australia in their political cartoons.

== Hopkins' death ==
Soon after Livingston Hopkins' death in August 1927 an article was published in Smith's Weekly recounting Ernest Laurence's version of the events that led to the artistic creation by Hopkins of the concept of 'The Little Boy from Manly'. Laurence, whose boyhood monetary contribution prompted the conception, had attended the funeral of the celebrated artist and related the details to the journalist who wrote the article.

== Gallery ==
A selection of 'The Little Boy from Manly' images
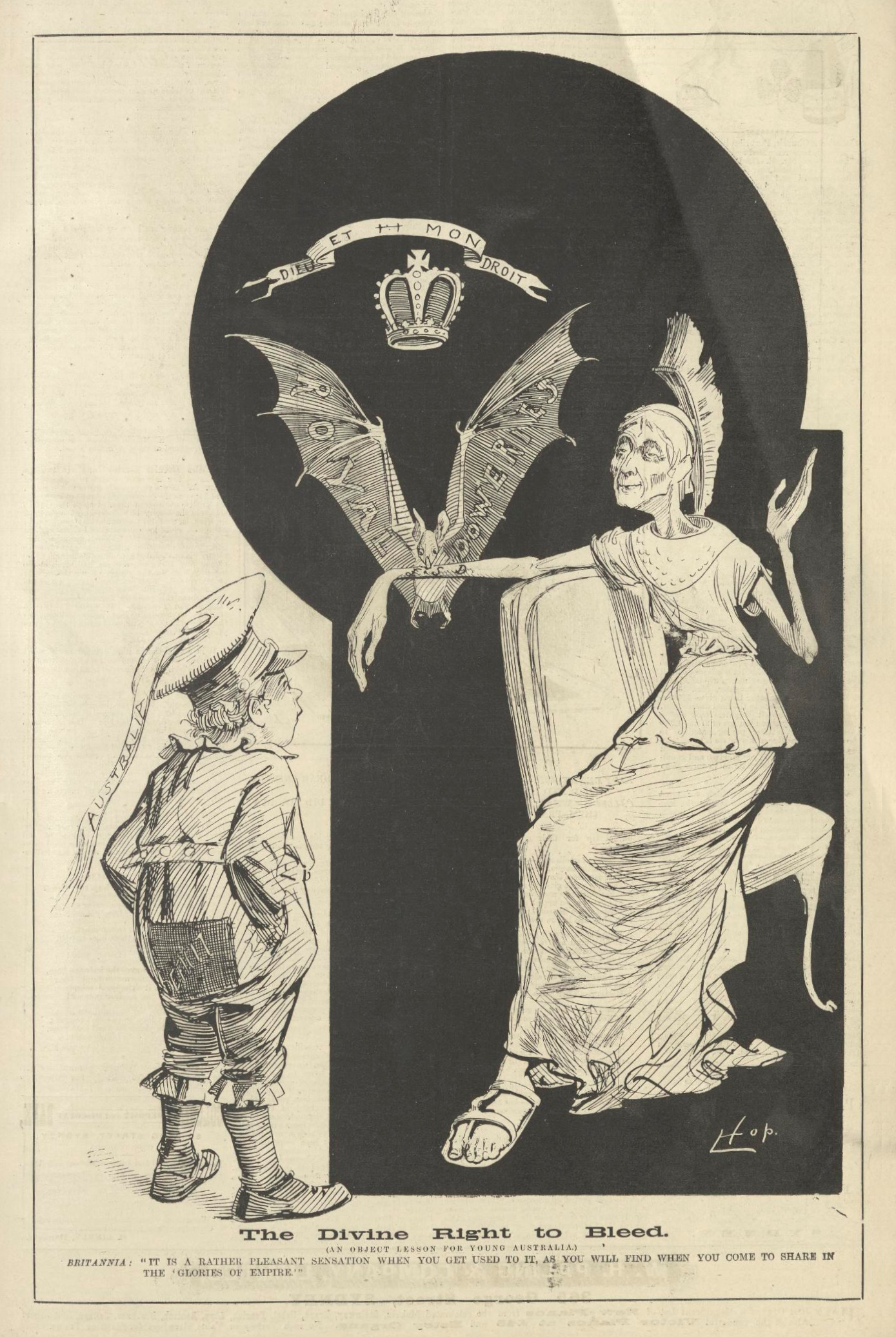
'The Divine Right to Bleed' by Livingston Hopkins (The Bulletin, 13 July 1889).

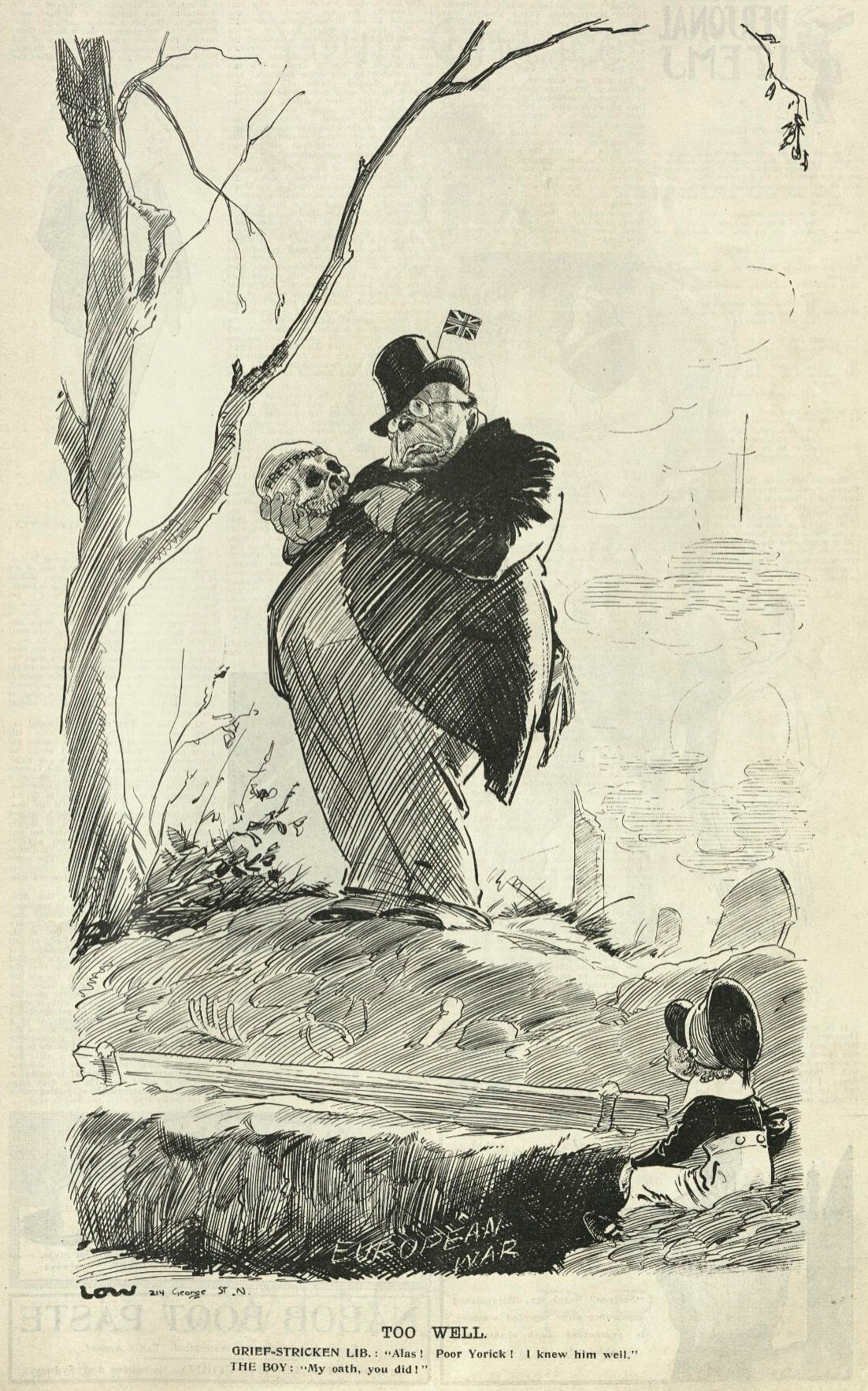
'Too Well' by David Low (The Bulletin, 1 October 1914).

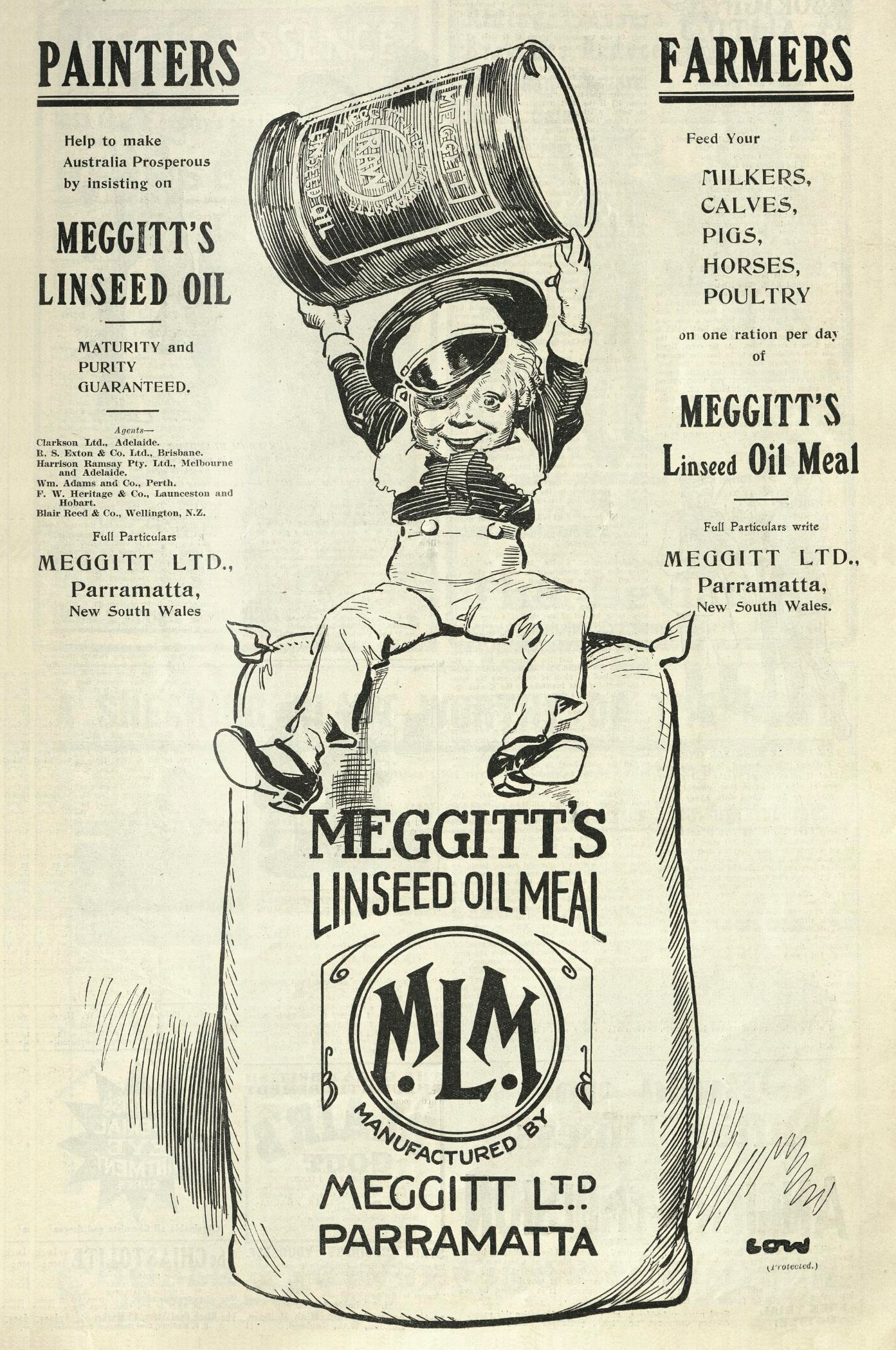
Meggitt Limited advertisement, featuring a cartoon by David Low (The Bulletin, 20 July 1916).

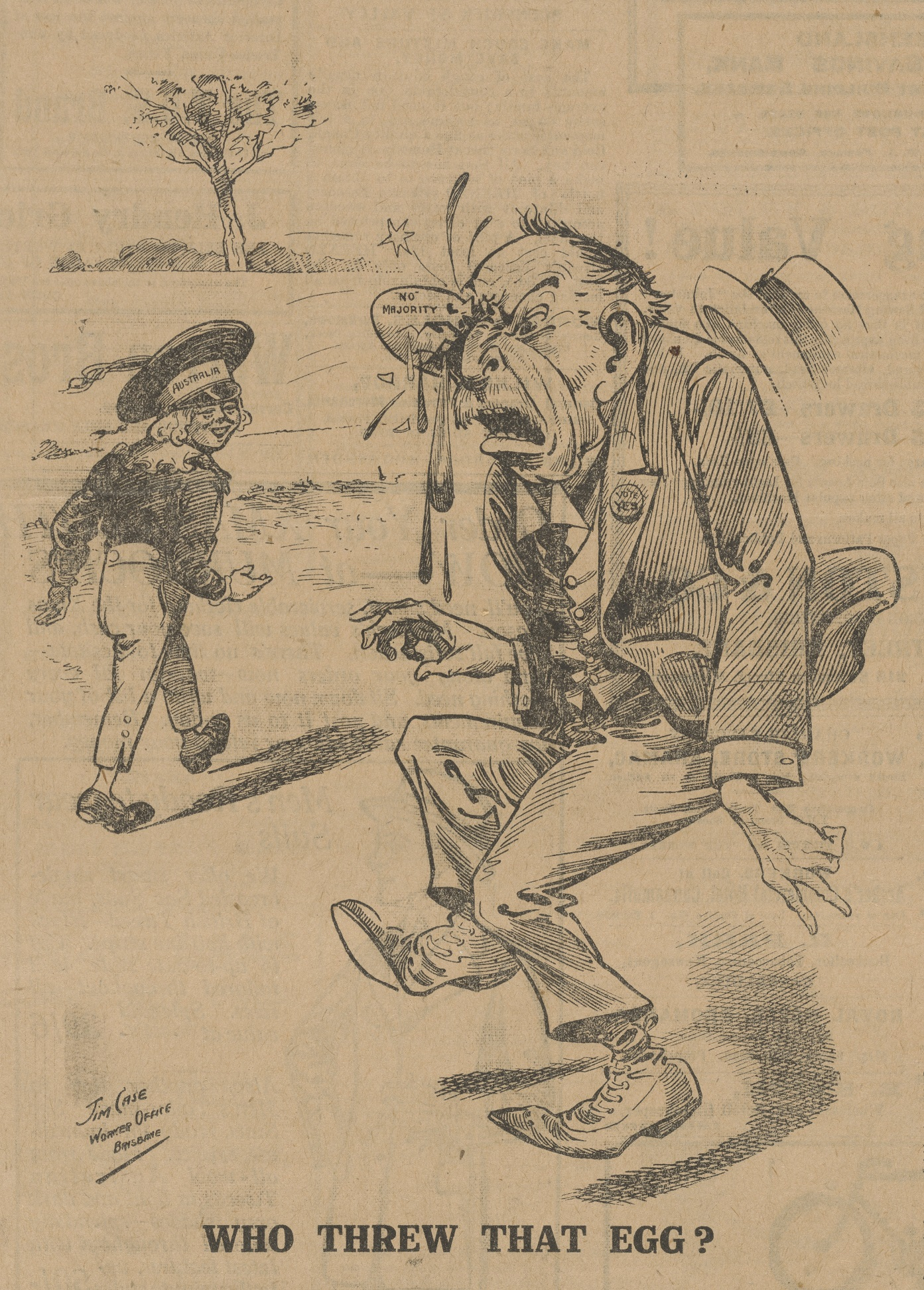
'Who Threw that Egg' by Jim Case (Australia's Pioneer Co-operative Labour Journal, 27 December 1917).

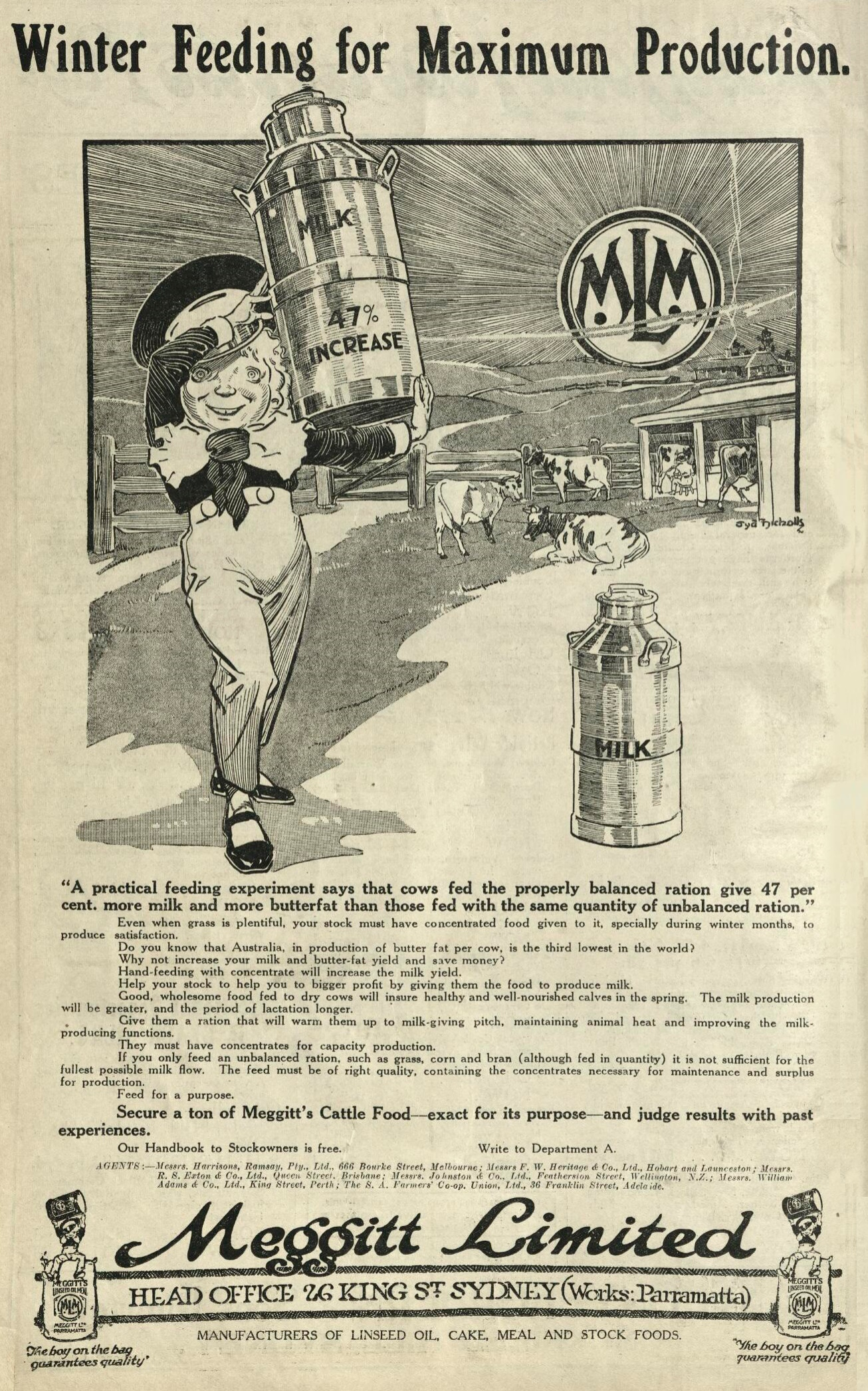
Meggitt Limited advertisement, featuring a cartoon by Syd Nicholls (The Bulletin, 7 July 1921).

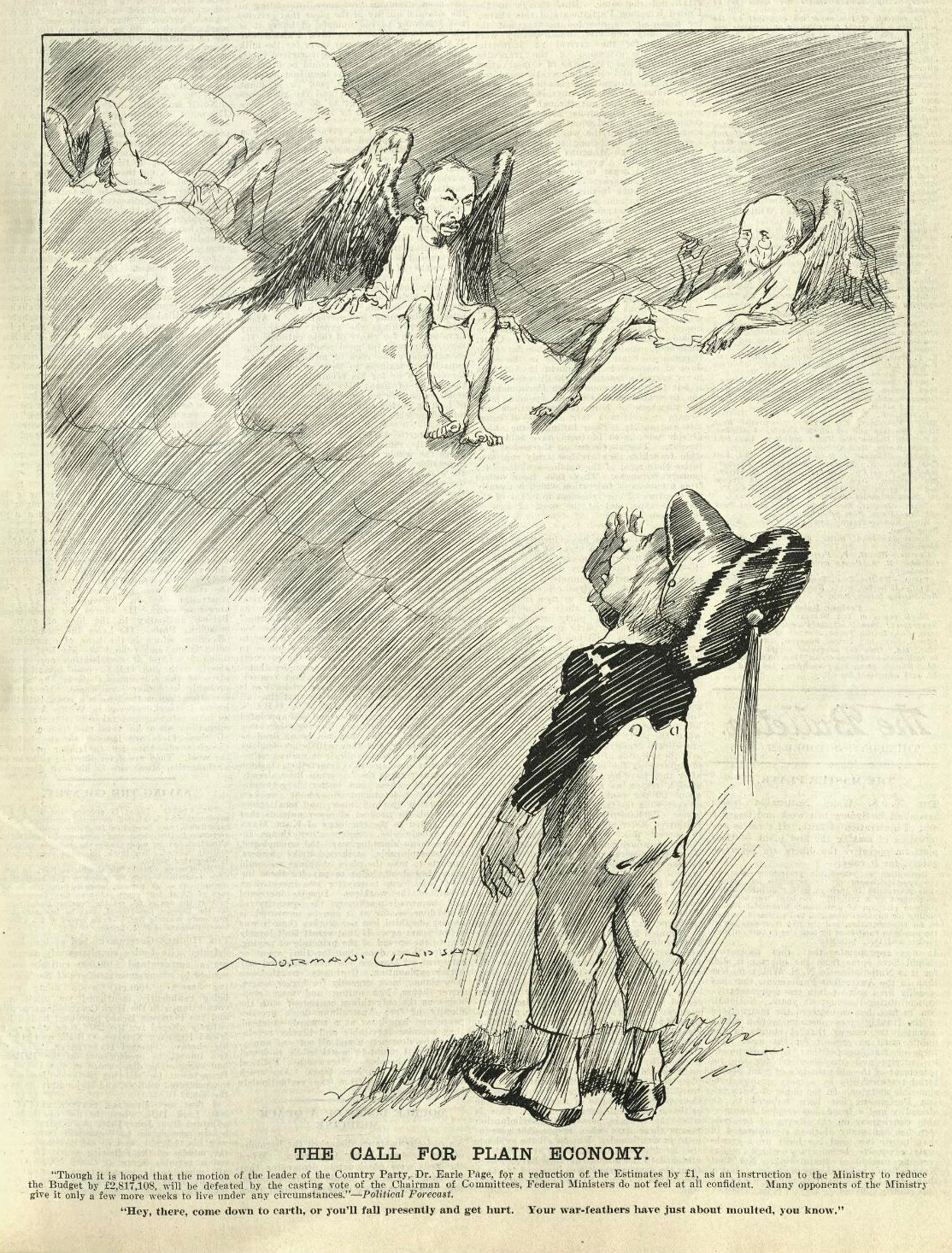
'The Call for Plain Economy' by Norman Lindsay (The Bulletin, 27 October 1921).

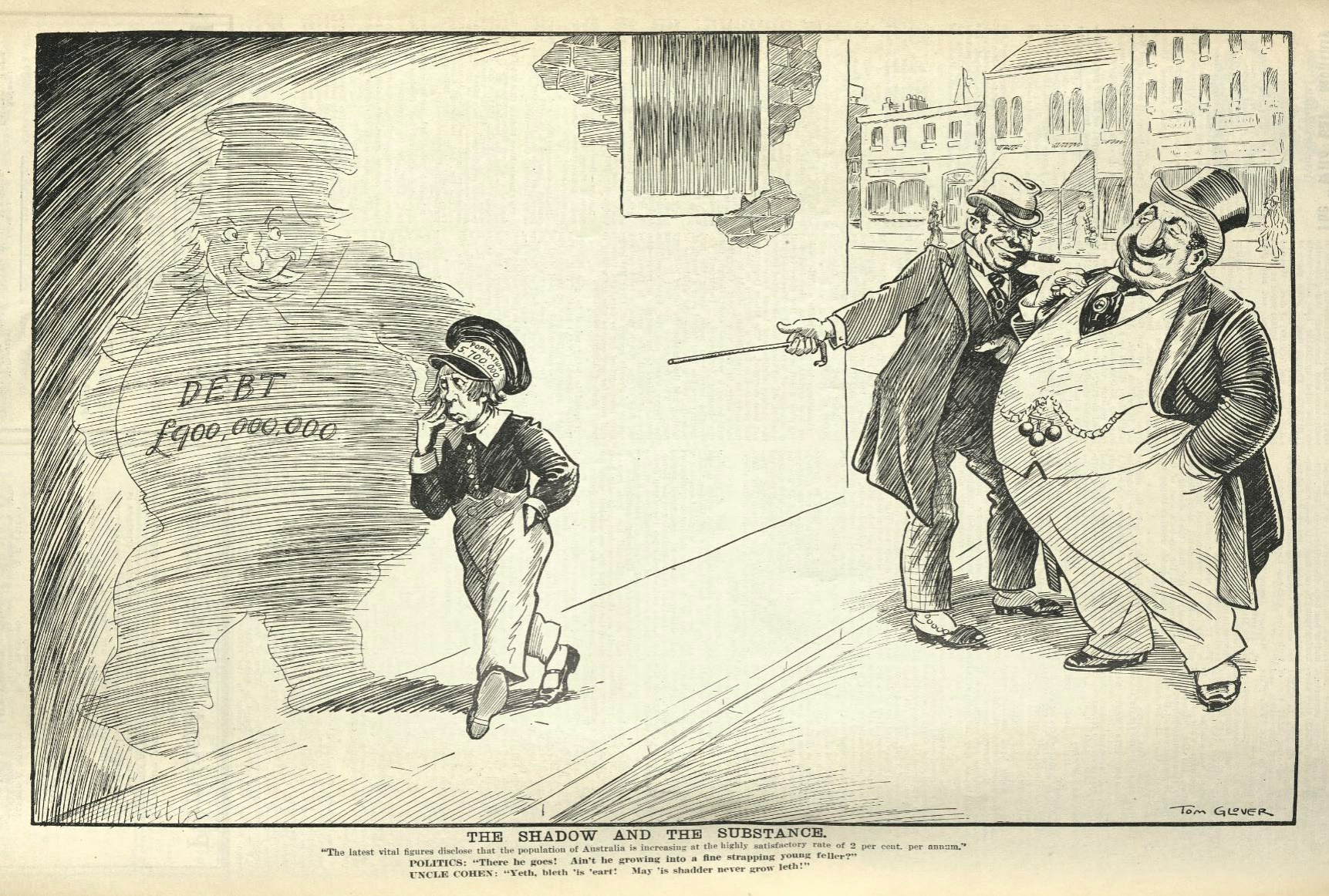
'The Shadow and the Substance' by Tom Glover (The Bulletin, 20 December 1923).

== Notes ==
A. Ernest Albert Laurence was born in 1876, the eldest son of solicitor Charles Laurence and his wife Ellen. His father served as mayor of Manly Council and also as an alderman of Ashfield Council. Ernest followed his father into the legal profession, becoming a solicitor. Ernest Laurence and Isabel Brown were married in January 1905. Laurence served as an alderman of Strathfield Council from 1915 to 1920, including a period as mayor (1917-1918). Ernest Laurence died in 1963.

B. Elizabeth Thompson's original work 'Calling the Roll After An Engagement, Crimea', better known as 'The Roll Call', was completed in 1874 and depicted a roll call of soldiers from the Grenadier Guards during the Crimean War. The celebrated painting was exhibited at the Royal Academy and purchased for the Royal Collection by Queen Victoria. A Sydney art-dealer, John Sands, purchased "a replica" of The Roll Call, apparently painted by Thompson herself (by an arrangement contingent on the sale of the original). Sands exhibited the copied painting at his George Street gallery in May 1885. The art-dealer offered to sell the painting to the trustees of the National Art Gallery and on 13 June 1885 it was reported that the sale had gone through.

C. In 1908 Henry William Meggitt established a factory for crushing oil seeds in Macquarie Street in Parramatta. The company Maggitt Ltd. produced linseed oil and oil-cake for feeding livestock. Meggitt's son Harold joined the business in 1910 and proved to be an effective agricultural salesman, expanding the business by marketing the oil-cake to initially-skeptical farmers. The factory was destroyed by fire in 1914, but the production facilities were re-built with an improved design, enabling increased production to meet a growing demand.
