= Conchoprimo =

Dominican stereotype and propaganda personification

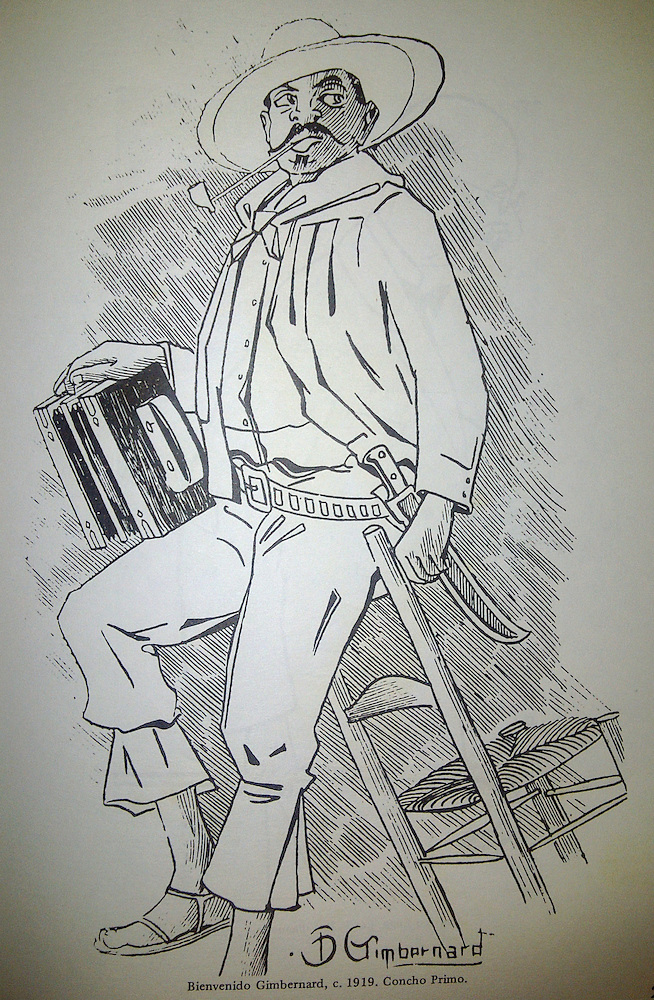
Concho Primo by Bienvenido Gimbernard, 1919

Conchoprimo or Concho Primo is a stereotype of peasant guerilla leaders in Dominican Republic who took part in numerous uprisings. Conchoprimo is viewed as a historical national personification of the Dominican Republic. His canonical image, in peasant clothes with an accordion and a machete, was created by the cartoonist Bienvenido Gimbernard in 1919.

Some Spanish dictionaries define 'conchoprimo' as "a character typical of the Montonero revolutions, who participated in armed uprisings." Accordingly, the period at the beginning of the 20th century until the American intervention in 1916 is called "the era of Concho Primo" or the era of "machete generals", and the corresponding chaotic political situation is called conchoprimismo.

The origin of the name is uncertain. There are various stories when a purported "conchoprimo" uttered in a bewilderment: "Concho, primo!". In this context, "concho" is a minced alteration of an expletive interjection "coño", i.e., "cunt" (Note: In Dominican Republic "concho!" is used to variously express admiration, astonishment, strangeness or pain ("admiracion, asombro, extraneza o dolor")) and primo means "cousin" (which may also be used as an address of familiarity, like "compay" or "bro"), i.e., the expression may be translated as "Damn, cousin!" or "Damn, bro!".

During the dictatorship of Rafael Trujillo many songs were dedicated to Concho Primo, and in remembrance of his accordion, a single-row diatonic-button accordion is called Concho Primo by some Dominicans.
