= Czech Vašek =

Historical personification of the Czechs

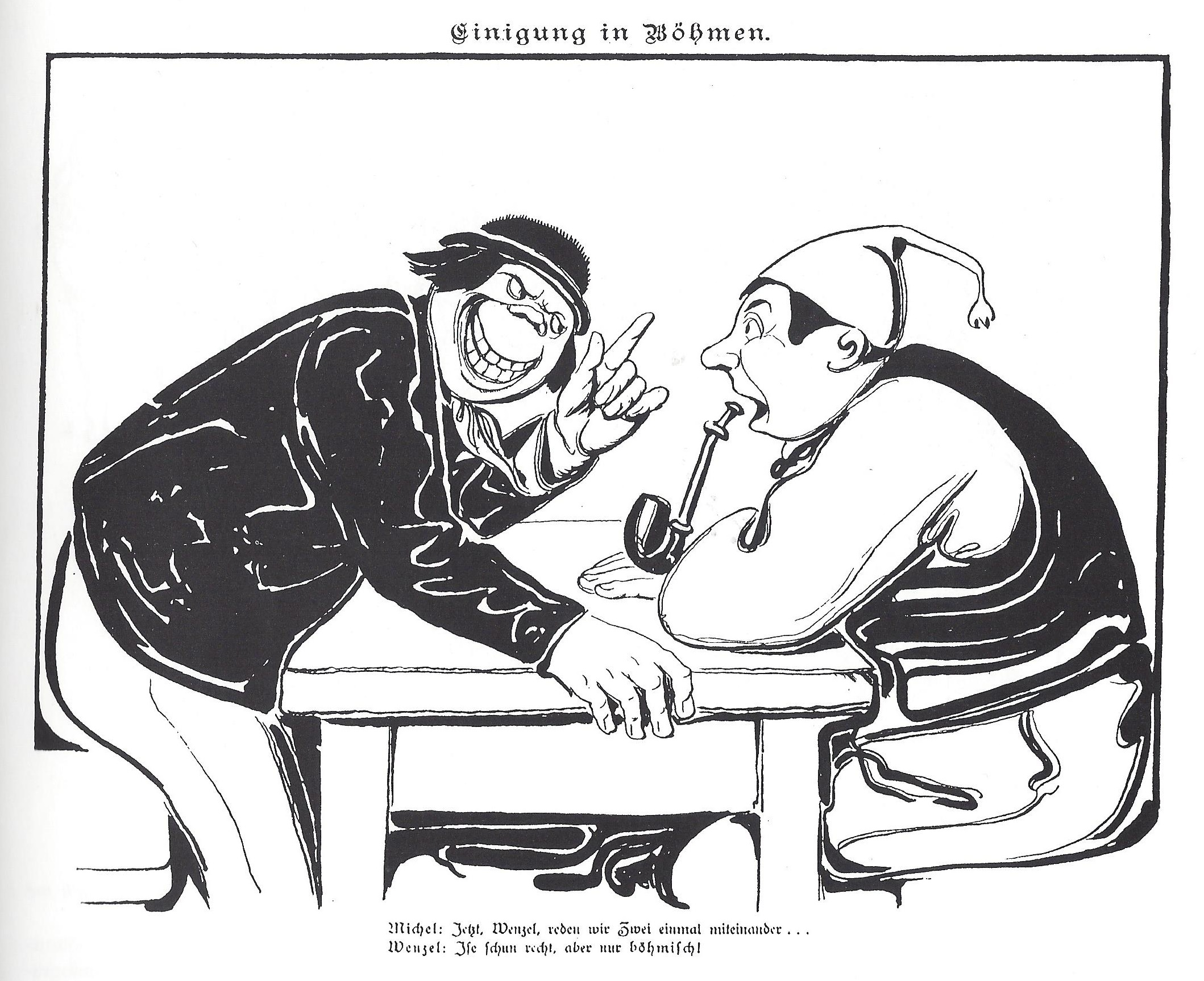
Negative caricature of Czech Vašek talking to Deutscher Michel

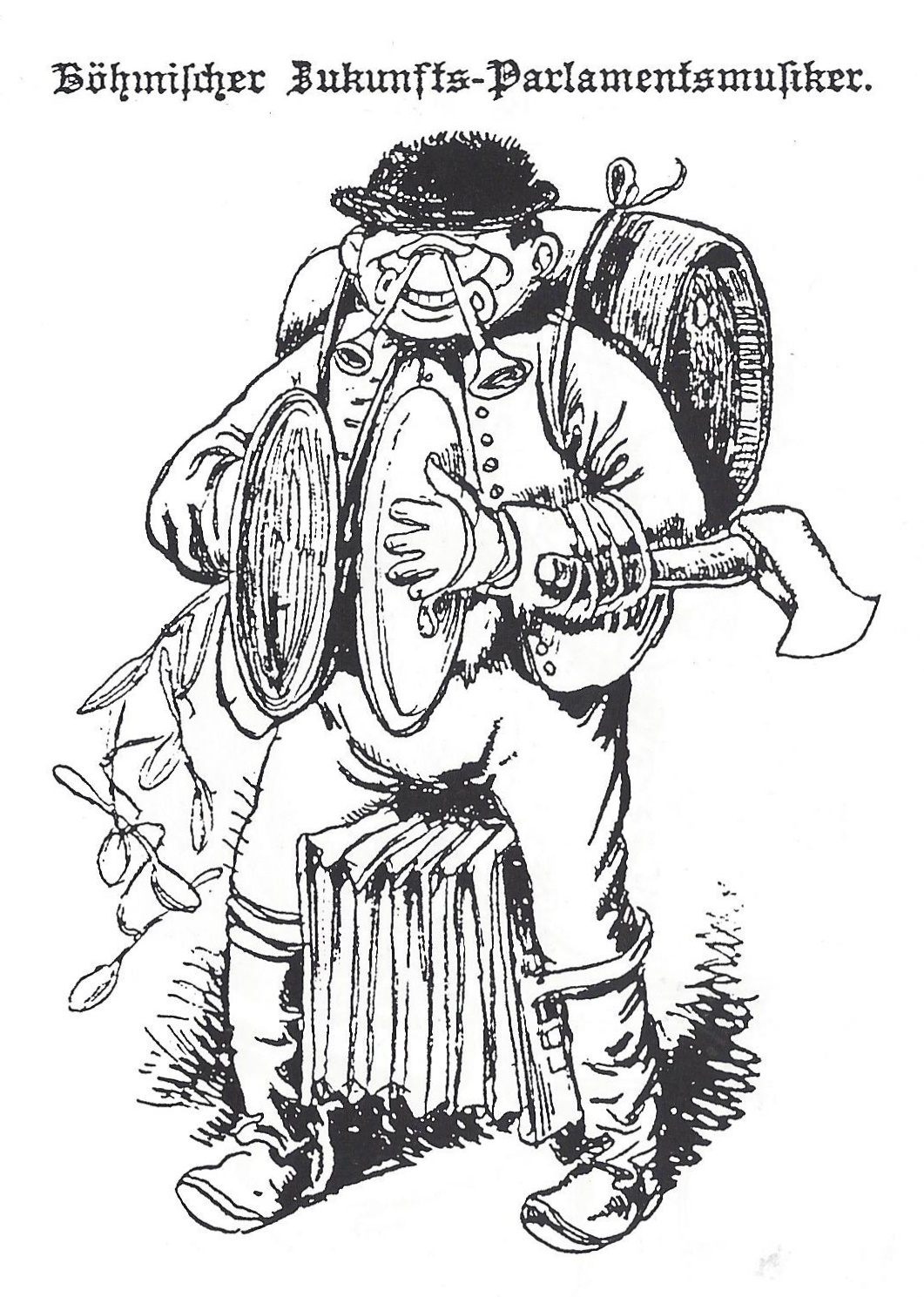
Böhmischer Zukunfts-Parlamentsmusiker

Czech Vašek (literal. "Czech Václav", German: "Böhmischer Wenzel") is a historical figure representing the national character of the Czech people used in time of national competition with German nationalism at the end of the 19th century.

== Overview ==
Such figures differ from those that serve as personifications of the nation itself, as Čechie did the Czech nation and Marianne the French. He is usually depicted in a folk costume combining hat from the Plzeň region with clothes from different regions.

They were used as a negative caricature of Czechs by Germans, symbolising them as street musicians. But also positively by Czech themselves.

Czech Vašek is considered a counterpart to Deutscher Michel, a figure representing the national character of the German people.

== See also ==
- Flag of the Czech Republic
