= Lady of Hungaria =

National personification of Hungary

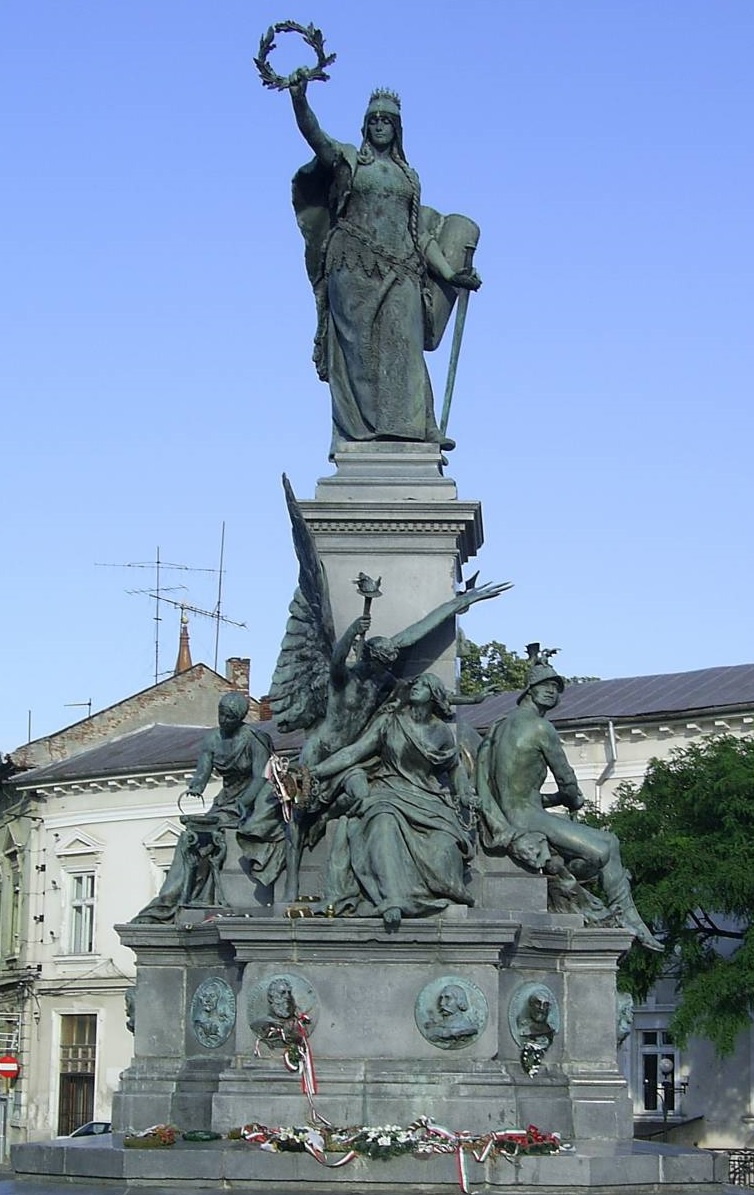
Lady of Hungaria at the monument of Arad

Hungaria is a national personification of Hungary, an allegory and a personification of the nation.

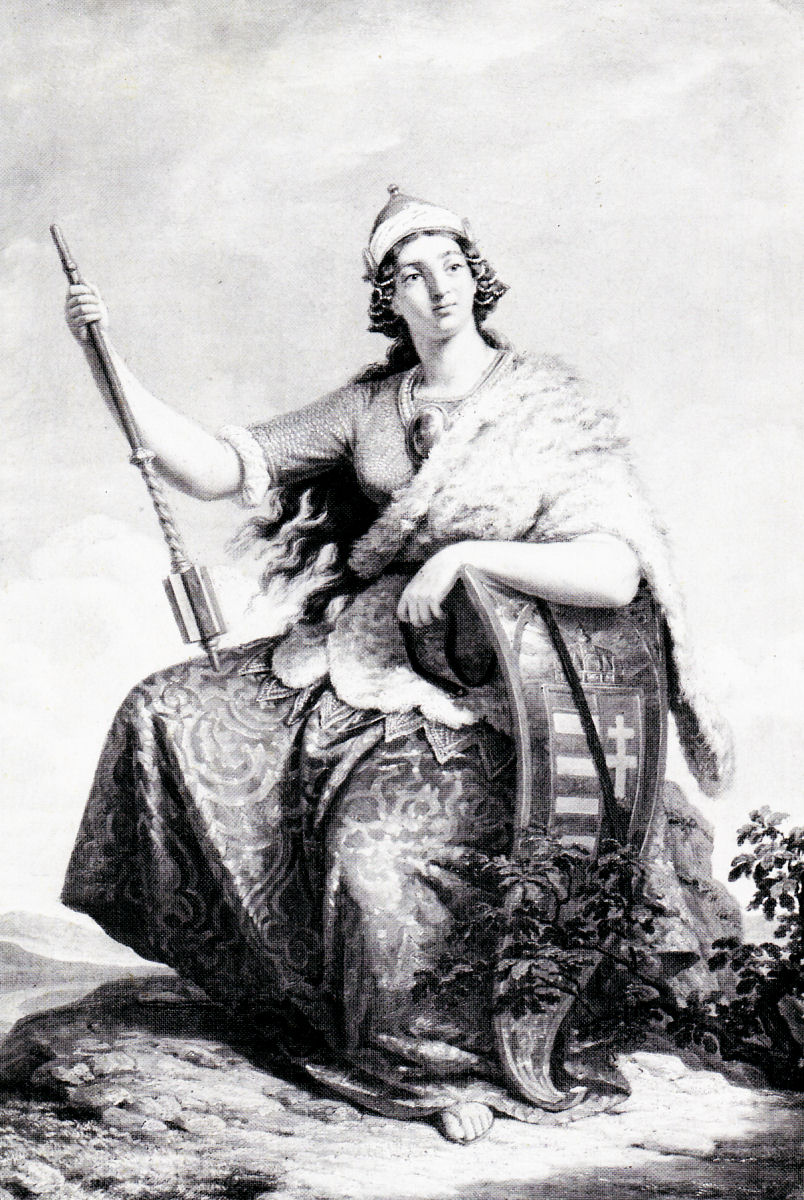
Hungaria by Henrik Weber

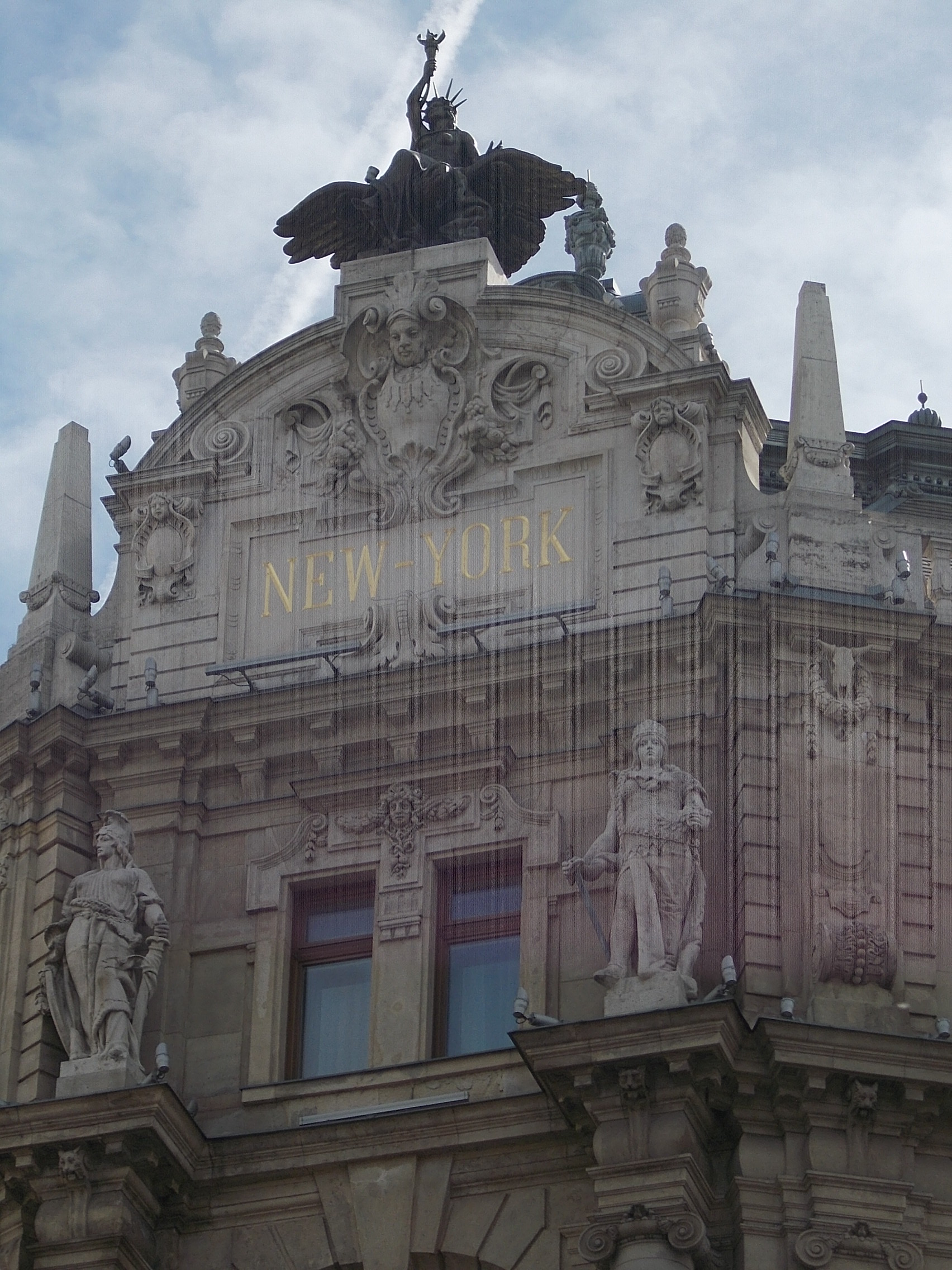
New York. America and Hungaria. Allegorical statues. - 9-11 Erzsébet Boulevard, Budapest

The Lady of Hungaria is displayed in many places in Hungary and across its borders. She symbolizes the liberty of Hungary.

== History ==
After the decades of the lost revolution and independence war of 1848/49 the Habsburg monarchy went into absolutism. In the 1860s, monuments were raised to commemorate the lost liberty. One of these depictions was the Lady of Hungaria. She is often symbolised as a woman with a helmet or the Holy Crown of Hungary on her head, and a sword and shield in her hands. At Arad where the 13 martyrs of independence war were executed, a huge monument was raised in 1889. The central figurine is Hungaria.

After the Treaty of Trianon and the loss of lives after World War I, the lady became the symbol for hope and the resurrection of Hungary.

== See also ==
- Statue of Liberty, a gift from the French people to the American people, to commemorate the American Declaration of Independence
- Columbia, an equivalent symbol for the United States of America
- Britannia, an equivalent symbol for the United Kingdom
