= Juan Bimba =

Venezuelan fictitious character

Cartoon of folkloric figure Juan Bimba.

Juan Bimba is a fictitious character used in the past as the national personification of Venezuela, but is now regarded as obsolete. According to the local folklore of the region of Cumaná the name comes from a mentally ill local inhabitant of the 1850s; but this version is doubtful. It was first used by Juan Vicente González, a Venezuelan columnist of the 19th century as an example of the average Venezuelan peasant, the prototype of the common people. The cartoon was drawn by cartoonist Mariano Medina Febres in the 1930s

== Use in politics ==
The name was used and preserved by Andrés Eloy Blanco in several poems and in the Fantoches magazine. A sociopolitical essay by the poet, in 1936, revolving particularly on socialism and communism in Venezuelan history, was entitled Carta a Juan Bimba («A Letter to Juan Bimba»).

Acción Democrática, one of the two leading political parties of Venezuela in the 20th century, used and further popularized the name and created an image to accompany the symbolism of their 1963 electoral campaign's motto: El Partido del Pueblo («The People's Party»), especially since the country's supreme court banned the use of their official flag. Recently, former Venezuelan president Hugo Chávez was seen performing a humoristic version of himself as Juan Bimba, particularly during political campaigning tactics, portraying the image of a humble llanero.

== See also ==
- Brother Jonathan
- Doña Juanita
- Huaso
