= Señora Juanita =

Señora Juanita (diminutive of Juana) is a name used for the average Chilean, and specially the older women from the countryside (in the manner of Britishman John Bull). A typical usage is: "How would you explain that to Señora Juanita?" (¿Cómo le diría eso a la Señora Juanita?). An example of the name used in this generic way can be seen in the title of this paper from the Centro de Economía Aplicada, Universidad de Chile: Estimando la demanda residencial por electricidad en Chile: a doña Juanita le importa el precio (Calculating the residential demand for electricity in Chile: Mrs. Jones does care about the price).

On February 26, 2004, President Ricardo Lagos coined the term during a press conference addressing the issue of telephone and drinking water rate setting, explaining the scope of the proposal as follows: "What I am trying to tell Mrs. Juanita, who knows little about international finance, is that in the bill she will pay for public services, there will be a decrease." He used it again during the Public Account speech on May 21 of the same year, and since then various political sectors have used it in their arguments.

== See also ==
- Donna Juanita
- Juan Bimba
- Huaso
- Roto
- Brother Jonathan
- Uncle Sam
- John Bull
