= Peter Kaad =

Australian architect (1898-1967)

Peter Kaad – Architect
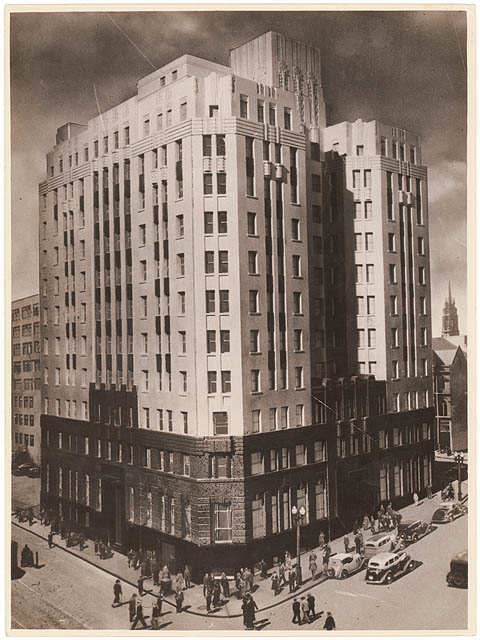
- Rural Bank Building, Martin Place
- Born: 1898; Rotumah, Fiji
- Died: 1967 (aged 68–69); Surfers Paradise, Australia
- Occupation: Architect
- Practice: Lipson & Kaad

Peter Kaad (1898–1967) was an Australian architect and a partner in Lipson & Kaad, a practice working in Sydney from the 1930s until the 1960s. His architectural partner was Samuel Lipson (1901–1995). In Migrant architects practising modern architecture Rebecca Hawcroft states that "the firm became one of the most successful and prominent in the period and designed several of the era’s best buildings". Both partners were influence by the Amsterdam School and in particular the work of Willem Dudok.

== Biography ==
Kaad was born on Rotumah, a small Fijian island and was educated at Newington College (1911–1914). He then studied architecture at Sydney Technical College before there was a university architecture course available in Sydney, but also attended architecture lectures in the Engineering Faculty at University of Sydney. His first employment was with the CBC Bank supervising the construction of branches in rural New South Wales. In the mid-1920s he worked with the firm Hall & Prentice (in association with three other young New South Wales Architects: Bruce Dellit, Emil Sodersten and Noel Wilson) designing Brisbane City Hall. The foundation stone was laid in July 1920 by Edward, Prince of Wales (later King Edward VIII/Duke of Windsor), with an opal encrusted 18ct gold and trowel, designed by Peter Kaad. On his return to Sydney he worked with the Commonwealth Works Department. A competition for the design of the Anzac War Memorial was commissioned in July 1929 he was awarded third prize. Kaad's major work before his partnership with Lipson was working on the now demolished Rural Bank Building, Martin Place.

== Lipson & Kaad major works ==
- Hoffnung & Co, now Red Cross House, Clarence Street, Sydney
- Truth Newspaper Building, Sydney, and Melbourne
- Hastings Deering, Crown Street, Woolloomooloo
- California Cafe, Macleay Street, Darlinghurst
- The Seabreeze Hotel, Blakehurst
- Temple Emanuel and Chevra Kadisha, Woollahra
- The United Carpet Mill, Five Dock
- Sebel Townhouse Hotel, Elizabeth Bay
- The Israeli Embassy, Canberra
