= Lipson & Kaad =

Former architectural practice in Sydney, Australia

Lipson & Kaad was an Australian architectural practice working in Sydney from the 1930s until the 1960s. The partners were Samuel Lipson (1901–1995) and Peter Kaad (1898–1967). In Migrant architects practising modern architecture Rebecca Hawcroft states that "the firm became one of the most successful and prominent in the period and designed several of the era’s best buildings". Both partners were influence by the Amsterdam School and in particular the work of Willem Dudok.

== Partners ==
=== Kaad ===
Kaad was born on Rotumah, a small Fijian island and was educated at Newington College (1911–1914). He then studied architecture at Sydney Technical College before there was a university architecture course available in Sydney, but also attended architecture lectures in the Engineering Faculty at University of Sydney. His first employment was with the CBC Bank supervising the construction of branches in rural New South Wales. In the mid-1920s he worked with the firm Hall & Prentice (in association with three other young New South Wales Architects: Bruce Dellit, Emil Sodersten and Noel Wilson) designing Brisbane City Hall. The foundation stone was laid in July 1920 by Edward, Prince of Wales (later King Edward VIII/Duke of Windsor), with an opal encrusted 18ct gold and trowel, designed by Peter Kaad. On his return to Sydney he worked with the Commonwealth Works Department. A competition for the design of the Anzac Memorial was commissioned in July 1929 he was awarded third prize. Kaad's major work before his partnership with Lipson was the now demolished Rural Bank in Martin Place, Sydney.

=== Lipson ===
Lipson was born in Leeds to Lithuanian Jewish immigrants and studied architecture at the Glasgow School of Arts. He was articled to Honeyman and Keppie. He arrived in Sydney in 1925 with an introduction to John Smith Murdoch the Chief Architect for the Commonwealth of Australia. He first worked in the office of Henry E. White but did not like his movie palace style and went to work with the Commonwealth Department of Works.

== Major work ==
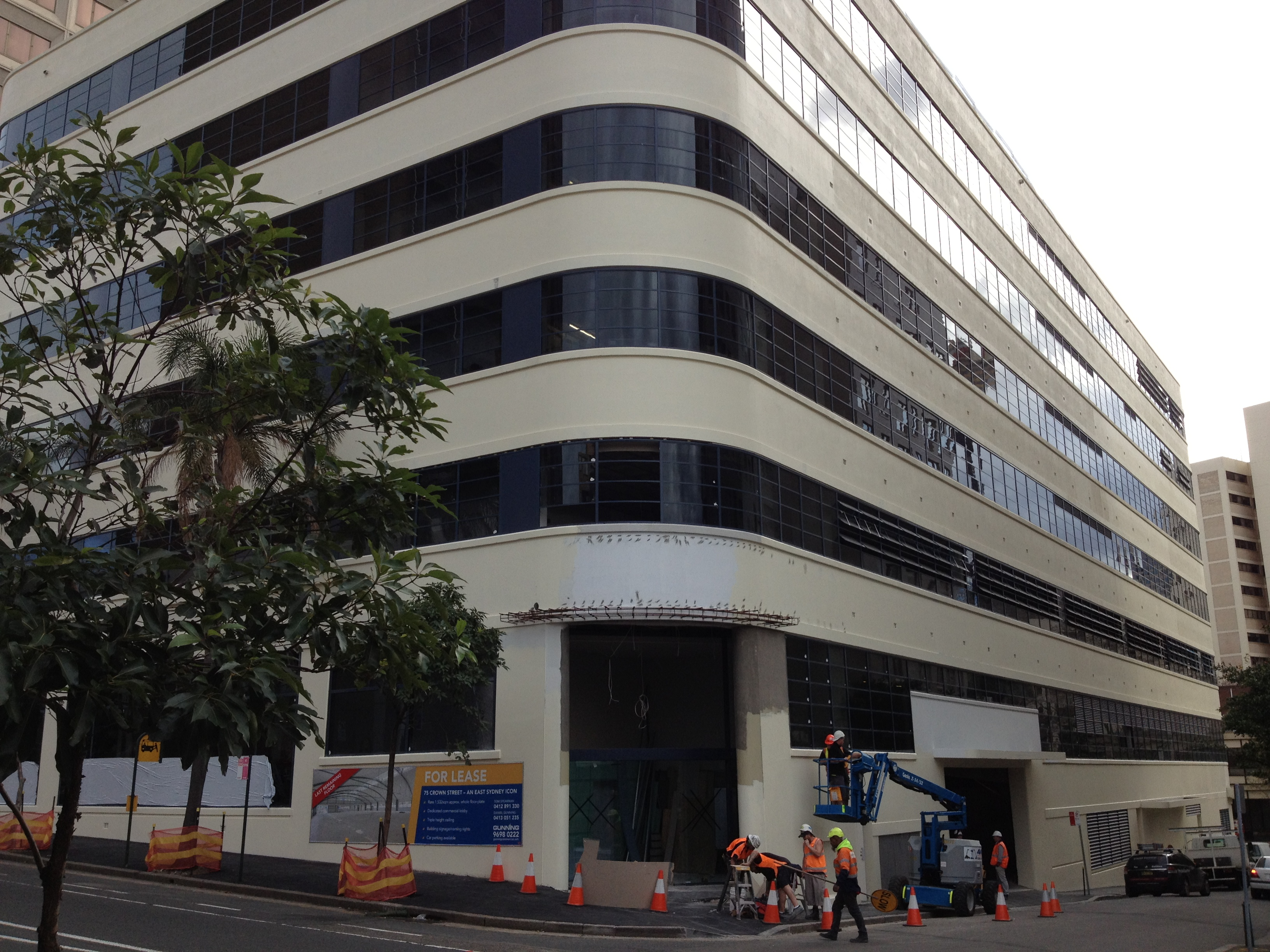
Hastings Deering during refurbishment in 2013

- Hoffnung & Co, now Red Cross House, Clarence Street, Sydney
- Truth Newspaper Building, Sydney and Truth Newspaper Building, Melbourne
- Hastings Deering, Crown Street, Woolloomooloo, Sydney
- California Cafe, Macleay Street, Darlinghurst, Sydney
- John Northcott Place, Surry Hills
- The Seabreeze Hotel, Blakehurst, Sydney
- Temple Emanuel and Chevra Kadisha, Woollahra, Sydney
- The United Carpet Mill, Five Dock, Sydney
- Sebel Townhouse Hotel, Elizabeth Bay, Sydney
- The Israeli Embassy, Canberra

== Archive ==
A representative collection of drawings, photographs, files and memorabilia of the firm's work is held by the State Library of New South Wales. Many of the firm's projects were photographed by Max Dupain.
