= MLC Building, Sydney =

Historic building in Sydney, Australia

MLC Building
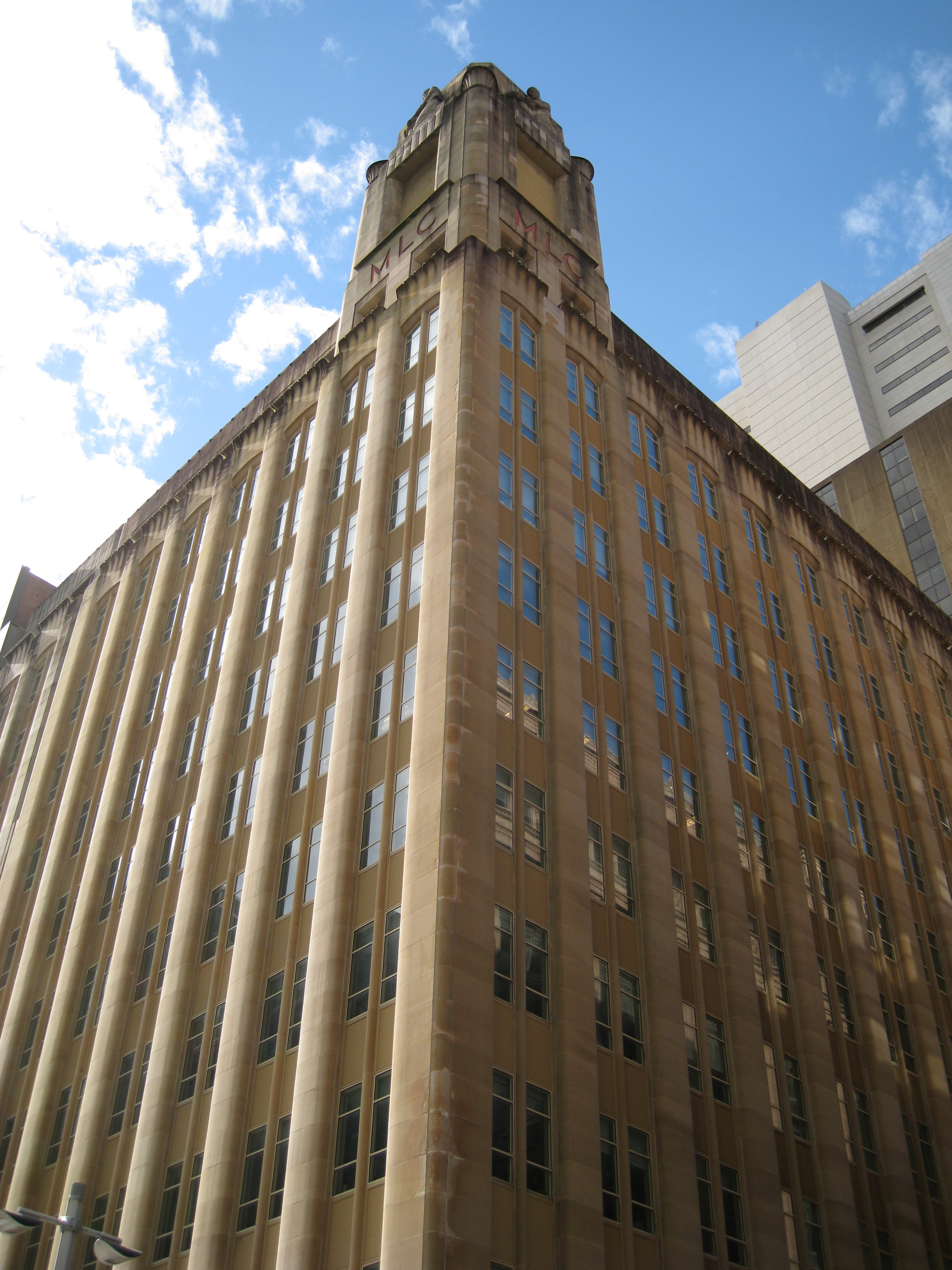
- The building facade, pictured in 2008

- Location within Sydney Location within Australia
- 33.8674°S 151.2096°E
- Location: 42–46 Martin Place, Sydney central business district, City of Sydney, New South Wales, Australia

History
- Built: 1936–1938
- Built for: Mutual Life & Citizens Assurance Company Limited

Site notes
- Architect(s): Bates Smart & McCutcheon (Sir W. P. Osborn McCutcheon)
- Architectural styles: Art Deco; Functionalist & Moderne Skyscraper

New South Wales Heritage Register
- Official name: MLC Building (Former); Mutual Life & Assurance Building
- Type: State heritage (built)
- Designated: 2 April 1999
- Reference no.: 597
- Type: Commercial Office/Building
- Category: Commercial
- Builders: Concrete Constructions Limited

The MLC Building is a heritage-listed office building located at 42–46 Martin Place in the Sydney central business district, in the City of Sydney local government area of New South Wales, Australia. It was designed by Bates Smart & McCutcheon and built from 1936 to 1938 by Concrete Constructions Limited. It is also known as Mutual Life & Assurance Building. It was added to the New South Wales State Heritage Register on 2 April 1999. From the time of its construction and for many years thereafter, the building served as the offices for Australian life insurance company, Mutual Life & Citizens Assurance Company Limited. As of December 2018 the anchor tenant was Norton Rose Fulbright, formerly Henry Davis York, an international law firm.

== History ==
Major insurance companies were formed in Victorian Australia, often with British assets, to cover the problems of world trade, internal communication, retirement and the constant hazard of fire. The Mutual Life and Citizens Assurance Company, which commissioned Bates, Smart and McCutcheon to build its new Sydney Headquarters at the corner of Martin Place and Castlereagh Street in 1936–1938, already had on the same site a substantial Victorian building, which was demolished in 1937.

During 1936 the Mutual Life and Citizen's Assurance Society held a two stage competition for the design of its new building to be erected on the site. It attracted more than 70 entries. The winning design by Bates, Smart and McCutcheon selected from a short list of six was built during 1937–1938. Bates Smart & McCutcheon were a distinguished Melbourne-based firm since 1926, although the experience of the principals went back to the nineteenth century. The majority of the firm's work prior to World War II was domestic and the MLC building is its only large commercial undertaking in Sydney between the wars. Other commercial buildings designed by the Bates Smart & McCutcheon during the period 1930–1942 include the AMP Building (1931) and Buckley & Nunn Ltd, Men's Store (1934), both in Melbourne. The building's architect Osborn McCutcheon was a man who garnered national respect from his peers, his work was recognised by the award of the RAIA Gold Medal in 1965 and he was knighted in 1966.

The building belongs to the period of recovery from the Depression and is the near contemporary of the City Mutual Life Assurance Building in Hunter Street, of Transport House and of David Jones' Market Street store. MLC also built a new headquarters in Melbourne as the Sydney building was nearing completion: the structural similarities, though not the detailing, of the two buildings are very striking.

Alterations were made to the Sydney building in 1987–1988 under the supervision of Clive Lucas Stapleton. These included the infill of the light well and relocation of the lift core and stairs, the widening of the Martin Place entry and the relocation of the executive suite to level 10. The existing granite lift core surrounds were relocated and reused and a matching surround made for a new fourth lift.

The MLC Building is one of a group of buildings which form the boundaries of Martin Place. Apart from the most recent buildings, and although individual buildings within the group have been constructed over a period of more than 100 years, there is a high degree of unity in building form, height and the use of high quality masonry materials.

The MLC Building is one of only three remaining buildings, (the others being the Commonwealth Bank and APA Building) which define the eastern end of Martin Place, forming a hard wall to a maximum height of 12 storeys. The building is very prominent when viewed from the eastern end of Martin Place, its verticality in design and the tower standing out and making a large contribution to the particular urban quality of Martin Place.

== Description ==
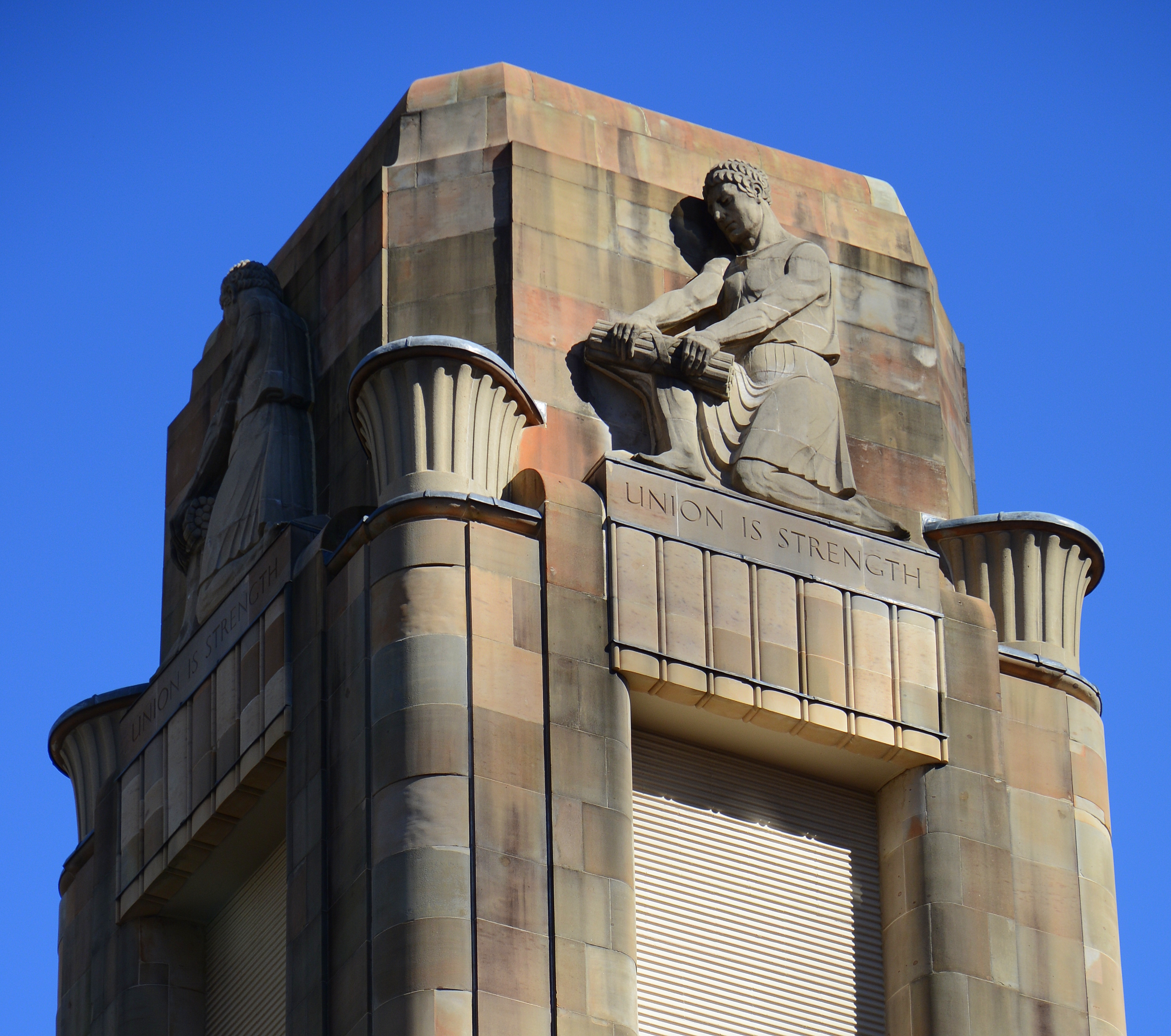
Detail of the relief sculpture on the corner tower, pictured in 2015.

The former MLC Building occupies a prominent position on the corner of Martin Place and Castlereagh Streets, Sydney. The steel-framed building was erected to a height of 46 metres (150 ft), the maximum allowable in Sydney at the time, although the tower rose another 15 metres (50 ft) higher. Externally the upper floors are clad in buff Wondabyne sandstone supplied by Hawkesbury Sandstone Limited. The base of the building is of "Rob Roy Red" from Sodwalls quarry. The stone has a tooled finish with a vertical polished scolloped polished border next to the window mullions. Polished Rose Red granite is used for the plinth course, running beneath the windows and around the doorways. The emblem of the Society has been incorporated into the detail over the main entrance from Martin Place and Castlereagh Streets. The granite was supplied by the firm Loveridge and Hudson Ltd.

The windows are arranged in pairs between wide piers with slender mullions between the windows. The innovative spandrel panels between the windows were enamelled fluted steel panels, the flutes running horizontally. It contains other architectural features of note, including the polished granite surrounds to the lift doors at ground floor level, and two pairs of large bronze doors to both entrances of the building (granite surrounds were re-erected around new lifts). A relief sculpture on the prominent tower above the corner of Martin Place and Castlereagh Street depicting the company's logo "Strength in Unity" a man attempting unsuccessfully to break up a bundle of rods. This emblem is prominent on all facades and on the lobby floor.

Internally the building originally included eleven floors above ground level, part of the ground floor and the whole of the upper five floors being devoted to the activities of the company, the others being available for letting. "Princes' Restaurant (now demolished) occupied the basement level while the sub-basement accommodated air conditioning plant and other services. A caretakers flat was included on the tenth floor. Most of the floors were left open so that partitions could be erected as required. On floors 1 to 5 a central corridor divided lettable spaces. The ground floor incorporated and insurance chamber on the Martin Place/Castlereagh Street corner and three lettable spaces. The executive offices of the company were located on the 9th floor, and were entered through a lift lobby and anteroom finished in traverine. The offices, boardroom and anteroom were finished in walnut and maple panelling and blue carpet. The 10th floor accommodated a caretaker's flat, and dining facilities for the staff.

A survey of the building made by Clive Lucas Stapleton and Partners in January 1987 to determine how the building had changes since construction is attached Figures 1–5 show the major alterations carried out since 1939. According to their report:

Generally, all the original partitioning on floors 1 to 10 was removed, ceiling and lighting replaced as well as flooring. All walls to the flat and dining facilities on the 10th floor were removed. All the executive offices on the 9th floor were replaced, except the lift lobby, staircase, boardroom and anteroom. On the ground floor, the insurance chamber remained relatively intact, as did the Castlereagh Street Entrance, but the main entrance vestibule and lift lobby was extensively altered. Princes Restaurant was removed from the basement.

The building has been extended to the west in a style matching the original. Windows and spandrel panels are now aluminium.

=== Condition ===
As at 19 February 2009, the building has maintained in good condition since the substantial renovations of the late 1980s. The main assurance chamber on the ground floor of rare scale and high quality finishes survives in substantially intact condition. The archaeological potential of the site is unknown.

=== Further information ===
It is one of a small group of extant major commercial office buildings built in Sydney during the second half of the 1930s. These are:

- Asbestos House, York Street – 1930–1935
- Manufactures House, O'Connell Street – 1935
- Railways House, York Street – 1934–1936
- City Mutual Life Building, Hunter & Bligh Streets – 1935–1936
- ACA Building, King & York Streeta –1936
- APA Building, Martin Place & Elizabeth Streets – 1935–1937
- Chatsworth House, Bent Street – 1936–1937
- Co-Operative Insurance House, Pitt Street – 1936–1937
- Transport House, Carrington & Margaret Streets – 1938
- Booth House, Young & Bridge Streets – 1938
- David Jones Store, Market & Castlereagh Streets – 1938
- AWA Building, York Streets – 1937–1939
- Red Cross House, Clarence & Kent Streets – 1937–1939
- Inter-Ocean House, George & Jamison Streets – 1939
- Water Board Building, Pitt Street – 1939
- Delfin House, O'Connell Street – 1938–1940
- Queensland Insurance Building, Pitt Street – 1940
- McNade House, Spring Street – 1940
- ACI Building, William & Boomerang Streets – 1940–1941

Of these buildings, and those built in other major Australian cities during the same period, the MLC Building is the best example of a building built in the Art Deco Skyscraper/Moderne style with a strong Egyptian design influence. MLC also built a new headquarters in Melbourne as the Sydney Building was nearing completion. The overall form and structural similarities, though not the detailing, of the two buildings are very striking.

Comparative Boardrooms

Boardrooms were included in the original design of the following Sydney buildings, of these only four still exist. The boardrooms in the City Mutual Life Building and the ACI are considered excellent examples of their type. They are not as large in scale as the MLC boardroom and are less formally conceived. The MLC boardroom is the only one with an anteroom and finely finished lift lobby.

- Railways House – 1934–1936 – Demolished
- City Mutual Life Building – 1935–1936 – Intact
- ACA Building – 1936 – Demolished
- APA Building – 1935–1937 – Demolished
- AWA Building – 1937–1939 – Intact
- Inter-Ocean House – 1939 – Demolished
- Water Board Building – 1939 – Demolished
- Delfin House – 1940 – Extensively Altered
- ACI Building – 1941 – Intact

Comparative Insurance Chambers

The following buildings include insurance or banking chambers:

- City Mutual Life Building – 1935–1936 – Substantially Intact but mezzanine introduced
- ACA Building – 1936 – Altered
- APA Building – 1935–1937 – Substantially altered
- AWA Building – 1937–1939 – Substantially intact
- Transport House – 1938 – Substantially intact
- Water Board Building – 1939 – Substantially altered
- Delfin House – 1940 – Intact

Of the substantially intact chambers those in AWA, ACA and Transport House are of inferior finish to the MLC Chamber. The significant chambers in Delfin House and the City Mutual Life Building are much larger than that of the MLC Building. However, the detailing of the MLC insurance chamber is unusual because of its plaster relief panels depicting scenes of everyday life in Sydney (in a similar way to the AWA Building and the Manchester Unity Building, Melbourne, c.1930. The chamber, although small, has very high quality finishes; such as moulded travertine and caste plaster bas-reliefs.

It is a major pre-war example of the work of Bates, Smart & McCutcheon, a noted 20th century Australian firm of architects. As the winner of a two stage design competition for a major building, it more than other buildings of similar age reflects attitudes about architectural taste in the late 1930s.

== Heritage listing ==
As at 16 October 2008, the former MLC Building is aesthetically significant as one of the best inter-war commercial office buildings in Sydney, and the best example in Australia of the exterior use of Egyptian derived motifs in such buildings. Its quality of design and use of materials make it one of the principal contributors to the architectural character of Martin Place which is recognised as one of Sydney's finest urban spaces. The building contains a substantially intact insurance chamber and relocated boardroom. ante-room and lift lobby and relocated remnants of other architectural features. The former MLC Building is historically significant as one of a small group (about a dozen) of major commercial office buildings constructed in Sydney during the second half of the 1930s. It is associated with the well known Melbourne architects Bates, Smart & McCutcheon, and as the winner of a design competition, reflects the architectural taste of the period.

MLC Building was listed on the New South Wales State Heritage Register on 2 April 1999 having satisfied the following criteria.

The place is important in demonstrating the course, or pattern, of cultural or natural history in New South Wales.

The MLC Building has historic significance as the headquarters of the MLC Insurance company in Sydney since the Victorian period. It is a major pre-war example of the work of Osborn McCutcheon, Bates Smart McCutcheon, a noted twentieth century Australian firm of architects. As the winner of a two stage design competition for a major building, it more than other buildings of similar age reflects attitudes about architectural taste in the late 1930s.

The place has a strong or special association with a person, or group of persons, of importance of cultural or natural history of New South Wales's history.

The MLC Building is a major pre-war example of the work of Bates, Smart & McCutcheon, a noted 20th century Australian firm of architects. The buildings designer, Osborn McCutcheon's contribution to Australian architecture was recognised in 1965 by the award of the RAIA Gold Medal and he was knighted in 1966.

The place is important in demonstrating aesthetic characteristics and/or a high degree of creative or technical achievement in New South Wales.

The MLC Building has technical significance due to intact fabric that demonstrates past building techniques and technology. The building contains rare examples of early porcelain enamel finished fluted steel spandrels beneath the windows. It is the best demonstrative example of the use of Egyptian derived motifs in the design of inter-war commercial office buildings in Australia. Its quality of design and use of materials make it one of the principal contributors to the architectural character of Martin Place which is recognised as one of Sydney's finest urban spaces.

The place has a strong or special association with a particular community or cultural group in New South Wales for social, cultural or spiritual reasons.

The building does not demonstrate a strong or special association with a particular community or cultural group in NSW of social, cultural or spiritual reasons.

The place has potential to yield information that will contribute to an understanding of the cultural or natural history of New South Wales.

It is an example of an Art Deco Skyscraper/Moderne style insurance building in Sydney. It features stone detailing with an Egyptian motif.

The place possesses uncommon, rare or endangered aspects of the cultural or natural history of New South Wales.

It is one of a small group of extant major commercial office buildings built in Sydney during the second half of the 1930s. (There are approximately 13 others) It is rare at State level. It contains a substantially intact late 1930s commercial insurance chamber of rare scale and high quality finishes. The MLC Building has technical significance due to intact fabric that demonstrates past building techniques and technology. The building contains rare examples of early porcelain enamel finished fluted steel spandrels beneath the windows. It is the best demonstrative example of the use of Egyptian derived motifs in the design of inter-war commercial office buildings in Australia. Its quality of design and use of materials make it one of the principal contributors to the architectural character of Martin Place which is recognised as one of Sydney's finest urban spaces. It contains a substantially intact suite of late 1930s commercial executive rooms, including the lift lobby, ante-room and boardroom, which is the largest and most formal of its type surviving in Sydney (the finishes of some of these spaces have been dismantled and stored.)

The place is important in demonstrating the principal characteristics of a class of cultural or natural places/environments in New South Wales.

The building is an important contribution to the urban quality of Martin Place and Castlereagh Street, having strong visual relationship with the Commonwealth Bank and APA Building and other major nineteenth and twentieth century office buildings in this locality. As the winner of a two stage design competition for a major building, it more than other buildings of similar age reflects attitudes about architectural taste in the late 1930s.

== See also ==
- Architecture of Sydney
- Australian non-residential architectural styles
