= Toowoomba Trades Hall =

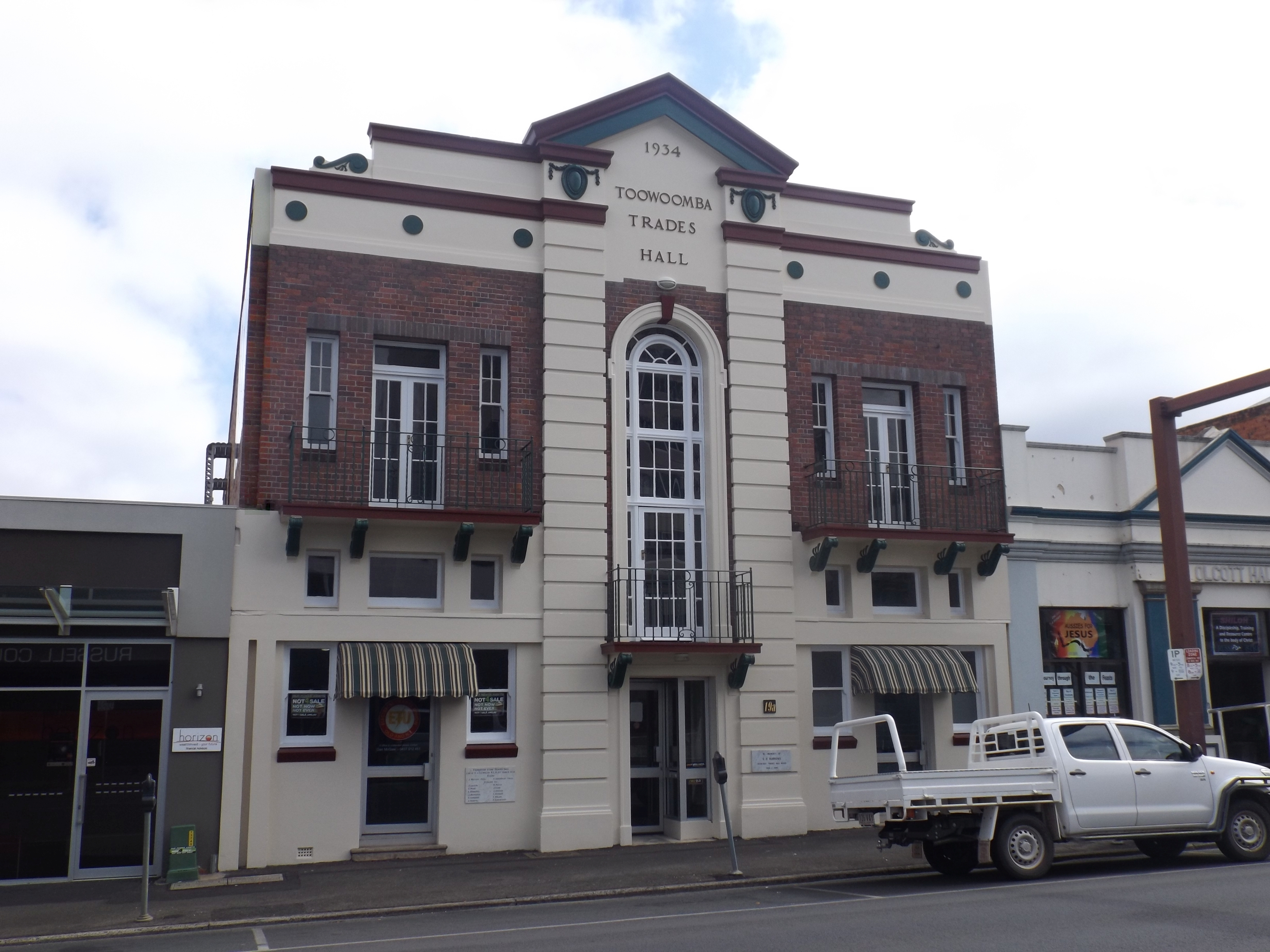
- Toowoomba Trades Hall, 2014

- Location within Queensland Location within Australia
- 27.559°S 151.9547°E
- Location: 19A Russell Street, Toowoomba, Queensland, Australia

History
- Design period: 1919–1930s (interwar period)

Site notes
- Architect: Matthew Williamson
- Architectural style: Classicism

Queensland Heritage Register
- Official name: Toowoomba Trades Hall
- Type: state heritage (built)
- Designated: 29 October 2010
- Reference no.: 602768
- Significant components: shop/s, hall, office/s, booth/stall
- Builders: Kell & Rigby

Toowoomba Trades Hall is a heritage-listed Trades Hall at 19A Russell Street, Toowoomba, Queensland, Australia. It was designed by Matthew Williamson and built by Kell & Rigby. It was added to the Queensland Heritage Register on 29 October 2010.

== History ==
The Toowoomba Trades Hall in Russell Street was built in 1934 by Kell & Rigby to the design of architect MC Williamson, for the Toowoomba Trades Hall Board, a group associated with the Toowoomba Trades and Labour Council.

As collectives agitating for improved working conditions, trade unions have been present in Queensland's economic landscape since its early beginnings as a colony. By the mid 1860s, small groups of skilled workers such as bricklayers, carpenters and stonemasons had organized into unions in Brisbane. When Queensland's economy and immigrant population expanded during the 1880s, trade unionism and labour activism became more widespread, encompassing a broader cross-section of workers, including those employed in pastoral and extractive industries throughout the colony. Over time, union activity and membership has experienced marked periods of growth and decline, affected by prevailing economic, social and political factors.

Like other Queensland cities with significant industrial components to their economy, Toowoomba became a regional centre for union activity. From the 1860s notable events connected to the labour movement were occurring in Toowoomba. In November 1865 about 200 navvies on the Main Range railway working ten-hour days for 7s 6d went on strike and marched into Toowoomba, to agitate for eight shillings for an eight-hour day. Early in 1866 Toowoomba's carpenters celebrated the commencement of the "eight hour system" for their trade. Although short-lived, it was at a meeting of 200 shearers in Toowoomba in March 1875 that the Queensland Shearers Union was formed, 12 years before another shearer's union was established. During the shearers strike of 1891, ten prisoners convicted of rioting at Lorne Station (some local), were railed to Toowoomba for trial, en route to Brisbane. A large group of union supporters assembled inside and outside the Court House, cheering on the prisoners. Troops were assembled and the local magistrate read the Riot Act, before the situation was defused by allowing large numbers of unionists to attend the trial.

In the early 20th century, smaller scale manufacturing connected to pastoral, extractive, primary processing and public utilities were the dominant industrial activities on the Darling Downs, employing a workforce of some 6000 people. As its major urban settlement, Toowoomba had the largest industrial base of the Darling Downs, with a range of enterprises including engineering, coach and wagon works, joineries and furniture makers, tanneries, maltings and breweries. In the 1920s Toowoomba's biggest employers were the larger scale industrial operations of the Toowoomba Foundry, the Defiance Flour Mill, and the Darling Downs Co-operative Dairy and Bacon Factories. Queensland Railways were also a significant employer, as it was the hub of the South-western rail network.

Queensland's first Trades and Labour Council was established in Brisbane in 1885, superseded by the Brisbane District Council of the Australasian Labour Federation (ALF) in 1889. Until its demise in 1914, the ALF operated during a period in which some of Australia's most tumultuous workers' conflicts had occurred, including the maritime workers' and shearers' strikes of the 1890s. The 1910s saw the emergence of the rurally-oriented Australian Workers Union (AWU), which became Queensland's most dominant union organization and rival to other large union bodies. By 1922 a range of these such as the Brisbane Industrial Council, Trades Hall Board and Eight Hours Union had negotiated to form the Queensland Trades and Labour Council (QTLC). Within its structure affiliated provincial councils existed throughout Queensland.

From the mid-1910s, the union movement in Queensland entered into a pronounced period of expansion. In 1915 the TJ Ryan Labor government came to power, heralding the beginning of a long period of political dominance by this party, interrupted for only three years (1929–32) until 1957. The introduction of the Industrial Arbitration Act in 1916, created a system of arbitration and compulsory conciliation. The improved outcomes for workers that resulted from this system and preference for unionists informed a rapid increase in union membership from 35.3% in 1915 to 53.8% in 1918. By 1928 two thirds of Queensland workers held a union ticket. During the tenure of the Country and Progressive National Party government led by AE Moore (1929–32), union preference was eliminated, basic wages were reduced and some award protections were dismantled; and union membership fell from 68% to 45.4%. After Labor resumed power in 1932 and reintroduced earlier benefits, membership quickly recovered to 62.6% of the workforce in 1936, before peaking in 1948 at 81.1%. By 1935 Queensland also boasted more women unionists (57.1%) compared to the overall Australian average (35%). Between the 1920s and 1960s union membership in Queensland generally remained higher than the rest of Australia.

A meeting of delegates from various labour organizations met in Toowoomba in April 1911, forming an Eight Hour Anniversary Union to organize the city's first annual Eight Hour Day celebrations in May. Butchers, shearers, council workers, builder's labourers, plumbers and tinsmiths, shop assistants, saddle and harness makers, and coal miners were among those who participated in the procession, which was followed by sports events and a "social" later in the evening. By early November it was reported that a Toowoomba Trades and Labour Council (TLC) had been established, deciding as one of their early actions to agitate for a universal Saturday half-holiday.

As the peak organization of union bodies in Toowoomba, the Trades and Labour Council (TLC) played a central role as the major advocate for the labour movement and workers rights on the Darling Downs. In this respect, it was similar to other provincial Trades and Labour Councils that existed throughout Queensland. Organizations affiliated with the Trades and Labour Councils varied in size and power and encompassed moderate to militant groups. The organization of Labour Day events in Toowoomba was an important annual activity with a range of events such as marches, football matches and dances being co-ordinated by the Council.

One of the key outcomes of the formation of Trades and Labour Councils and other larger union bodies was the establishment of trades halls, where unions and others involved in the labour movement could centrally gather for organizational activities, and to host educational and social events.

Queensland's first trades hall was established in Brisbane in 1891. While some were established in existing buildings, as occurred at Rockhampton (1914) and Townsville, others were purpose-built including those at Ipswich (1929), Brisbane (1891;1923) and Toowoomba (1934). By the 1930s fourteen regional Trades and Labour Council buildings existed in the state. Trades halls generally accommodated a large hall space and a collection of smaller rooms used for meetings and offices.

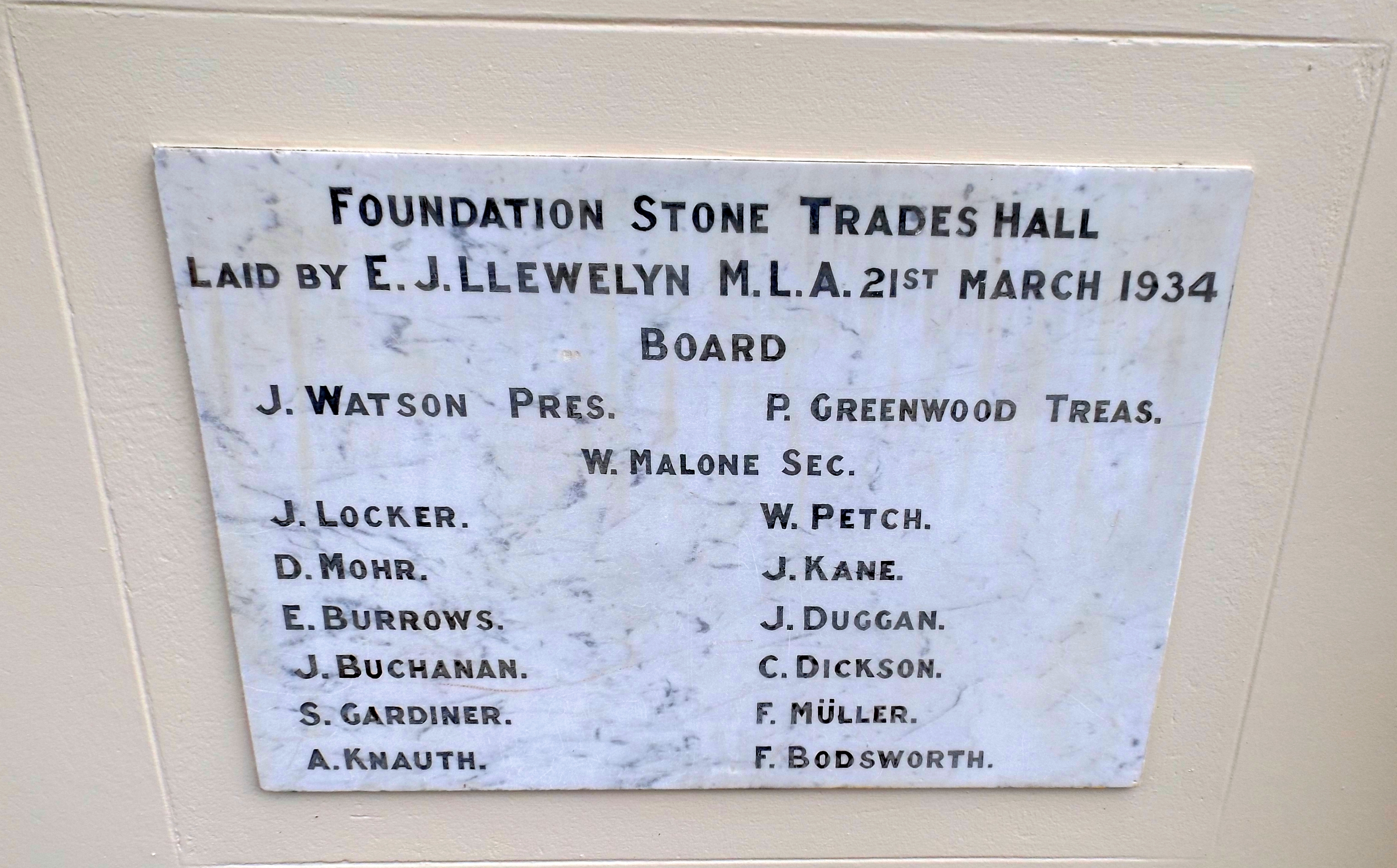
Toowoomba Trades Hall foundation stone

In Toowoomba, land was purchased in Bowen Street in 1916 with the intention of erecting a trades hall, but financial difficulties prevented this from occurring and the property was sold. In 1919 the Toowoomba Trades Hall Board purchased the Congregational Church in Margaret Street. A foundation stone was laid in February 1920 by Toowoomba MLA Frank Tenison Brennan (Labor member) to mark the church's new use as Toowoomba's Trades Hall. By 1929 the building was deemed unsuitable for Trades Hall purposes and the property was sold. In the same year, the Trustees of the Board acquired property (subdivision 35 and resubdivision 1 of subdivision 36 of suburban allotment 11, section 6) at the east end of Russell St for £1600. Title records show that this property was previously leased by a succession of publicans who operated the Western Hotel on the nearby corner of Russell and Ruthven St, though what buildings, if any, existed, or what purpose the site served is unclear.

When the Russell St property was purchased in 1929, the intention of the Trades Hall Board was to erect a two-storey building with shop space on the street. It was not until early 1933 when the financial position of the Trades Hall Board improved, that efforts to construct the new hall moved forward. The board initially engaged architect Arthur Bligh to prepare a design for the building, but following its rejection by the Toowoomba Council during 1933, it were not proceeded with. In October 1933, the Trades Hall Board appointed Matthew C Williamson as architect. Born in 1901 in Toowoomba, Williamson was an articled pupil with Francis Richard Hall in Brisbane (1923–29) before being employed as his assistant in 1929–30. Williamson worked for himself in Toowoomba from 1931, and was responsible for numerous projects in the city during the 1930s, as well as buildings in Dalby (including its Fire Station), Miles, Crows Nest and Oakey.

The following month plans prepared by Williamson in consultation with the Board were adopted and the architect was instructed to call tenders. Contractor's conditions included preference to local men supplied through the Bureau of Industry who were financial union members; awards and conditions be strictly observed by the contractor and, where practicable, local material be used. Following approval for a loan of £2100, Kell & Rigby's tender of £3948 for the new hall was accepted in February 1934. A Sydney firm, Kell & Rigby established offices in Brisbane and Toowoomba in the early 1930s. Notable work undertaken included Toowoomba's Empire Theatre (1933), and the Masel Residence at Stanthorpe (1937–38).

Shortly after the tender was accepted, the particulars of the new trades hall were outlined in the Toowoomba Chronicle. The hall was to be a two storey brick building with the front elevation dressed with cement. On either side of the central main entrance two "rusticated piers" extending the height of the building supported a pediment. On either side of these, were spaces for tenants with provision for future shop fronts. The remainder of the ground floor contained committee rooms, supper room, kitchenette and a store room. Inside the main entrance a staircase led upstairs to the large hall space containing a specially treated dance floor of tallow wood with a platform, cloak rooms, ticket box and fire escape stairs. To improve ventilation, balconettes opened out from the hall on the building front of Russell Street. The report also outlined that the secretary of the board had devised a scheme where a voluntary levy on employed unionists of 1 pence per week would help to offset the cost of the hall.

A ceremony to mark the laying of the foundation stone of the hall occurred on 23 March (the date of 21 March inscribed on the stone is incorrect). Local Labor MLA E J Llewelyn performed the honours, remarking that the building would be, "...a decided acquisition to the city... a memorial of working class ideals-of union activities... [and] would demonstrate that the workers of the city recognised their obligation to one another, and that they would stand shoulder to shoulder, one for all and all for one." In conjunction with the opening, a fete was held to raise funds for the hall. By this time the building was estimated to cost £4200 with half this amount "in hand" and the remainder sourced from the loan. Each Board member paid four shillings to have their name included on the stone, prepared by Toowoomba stonemasons Zeigler and Sons.

The Toowoomba Trades Hall was officially opened by Mr J Watson, president of the Trades Hall Board on Saturday 14 July 1934. A number of Labor parliamentarians and union delegates spoke at the ceremony highlighting the development and achievements of the labour and trade union movement in Toowoomba and beyond. For WJ Copley, Member for Bulimba, the completion of the hall "marked another epoch in the Labour movement in Queensland", contending there was not a better trades hall outside of Australia's capital cities. As part of the opening celebrations a "smoke concert" was held in the hall during the evening. A grand opening ball occurred in the hall the following week (17 July), the first of many dances held throughout 1934/35, as a way of raising funds to pay off the hall debts.

The Trades Hall Board formed a Rents Committee to manage the use of the hall, supper room and meeting rooms. The Toowoomba branch of the Amalgamated Society of Carpenters and Joiners may have been the first union to gather in the new hall, holding their regular meeting the night before the official opening. In 1934 the Board allowed unemployed workers to use rooms free of charge, on the condition "that no Communist agitation be carried on" and that any Board member could attend a meeting. The 1930s rental ledger of the trades hall records a diverse range of unions and Labor party organizations regularly using the rooms and hall for meetings and functions. In 1950 the State Labour in Politics Convention was held in the hall.

In facilitating the gathering of various union bodies at small and large meetings, the trades hall was an important place to discuss, debate, form positions and decide on actions related to workplace issues and industrial disputes of local, state and national importance.

Tenants listed at the address of the trades hall in 1939 included the Toowoomba Ruling Company (printers), boot repairer J Manson and two taxi hire companies. During 1942 the trades hall was among a number of Toowoomba buildings that were occupied for military purposes, with tenants and other users required to relocate elsewhere following its occupation as the Headquarters Office for the No. 3 Advance Ordinance Depot of the Australian Military Forces. At this time, the Toowoomba Ruling Company occupied two rooms, the Trades and Labour Council, Toowoomba and East Toowoomba ALP branches and nine individual unions were regularly using spaces in the building, and other unions were renting on a casual basis.

In addition to its primary function of providing a central gathering place for union-related activity, the building was an important social space for numerous Toowoomba civic groups that rented rooms and the hall. From ballerinas to boxers, the Buffalo Lodge to municipal bands, a diverse range of organizations made use of the building, although local "rock and rollers" were no longer allowed to hold dances following damage to the hall in 1959.

Since its opening in 1934, the Trades Hall Board has been responsible for the management and maintenance of the building. Over its history the board has been served by dedicated (and often longstanding) members who are commemorated by an honour board and photos in the lounge area upstairs. The board has included union delegates who went on to play larger roles in the civic affairs of Toowoomba and Queensland, most notably Jack Duggan, Secretary of the Trades Hall Board and President of TLC who was a longstanding local Labor member for Toowoomba, Minister for Transport (1947–57) and Leader of the Opposition (1958–1966). In December 1958 Duggan (then State Opposition Leader) unveiled a plaque right of the main entrance of the trades hall, to honour EH (Ted) Burrows' service to the trade union movement. Ted Burrows was a member of the Trades Hall Board for 25 years and secretary for 14 years. At the same ceremony a photo of Lesley Wood was hung in the hall. He was the former ALP Member for Toowoomba, Leader of the Opposition prior to Duggan, and had died suddenly in March 1958.

Over time, some alterations have occurred to the building. In 1954 the Board sought an overdraft for the purpose of installing a new floor in the dance hall. Further extensive work on the hall was undertaken during 1959/60, with much of it being undertaken on a voluntary basis by workers from the Carpenters Union and board members.

The Trades Hall commemorated 50 years of use in 1984 with celebrations held in December of that year. Past and present board members and delegates attended including Jack Duggan, who by this time was the only surviving original board member.

To meet the requirements of tenants, the Toowoomba Community Legal Service, and to expand the availability of office space, some internal spaces of the trades hall were reorganized and altered in 1994. On the ground floor, some office spaces were extended and linked to adjoining rooms by partitions and doorways. The fronts of the offices flanking the corridor were replaced, with an earlier arrangement of silky oak panelling topped by glass windows reversed, and a door way into the supper room was removed. On the first floor, the western side of the hall was filled with a line of offices and a kitchen recess, an earlier stage was replaced and an office space was incorporated into the east side of the hall. The ceiling was also repanelled during these alterations. Despite these changes, the earlier internal configuration of the building remains discernible and an understanding of how the trades hall has functioned over its history is readily apparent.

In 2010 the Trades Hall continues to function as a meeting place for Toowoomba's unionists. The building is believed to be the oldest surviving purpose-built trades hall in Queensland in continuous use. Earlier examples from the first half of the 20th century that existed elsewhere in the state have been demolished (including those in Brisbane, Ipswich, and Rockhampton) or are used for other purposes (Townsville).

== Description ==
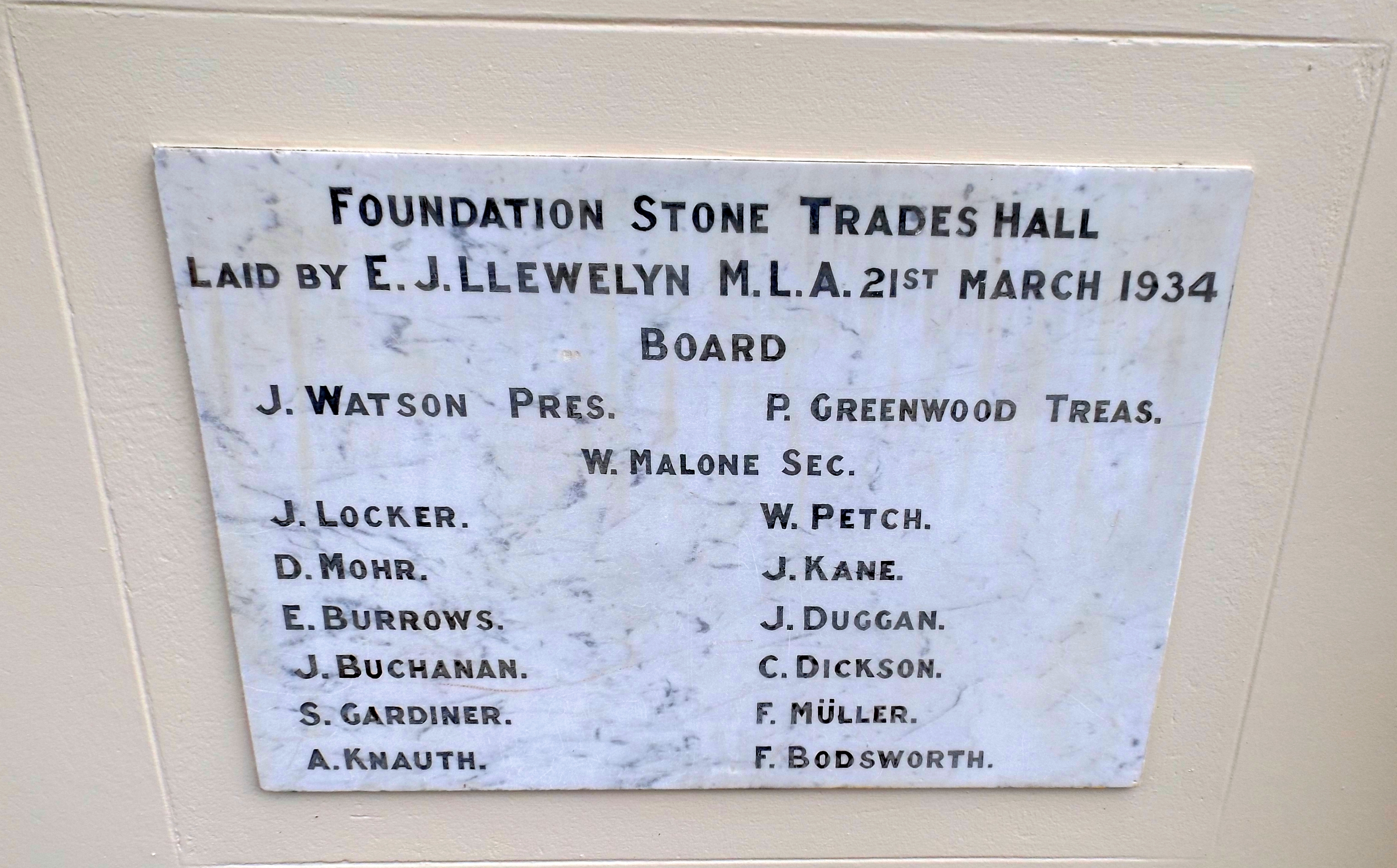
Foundation stone

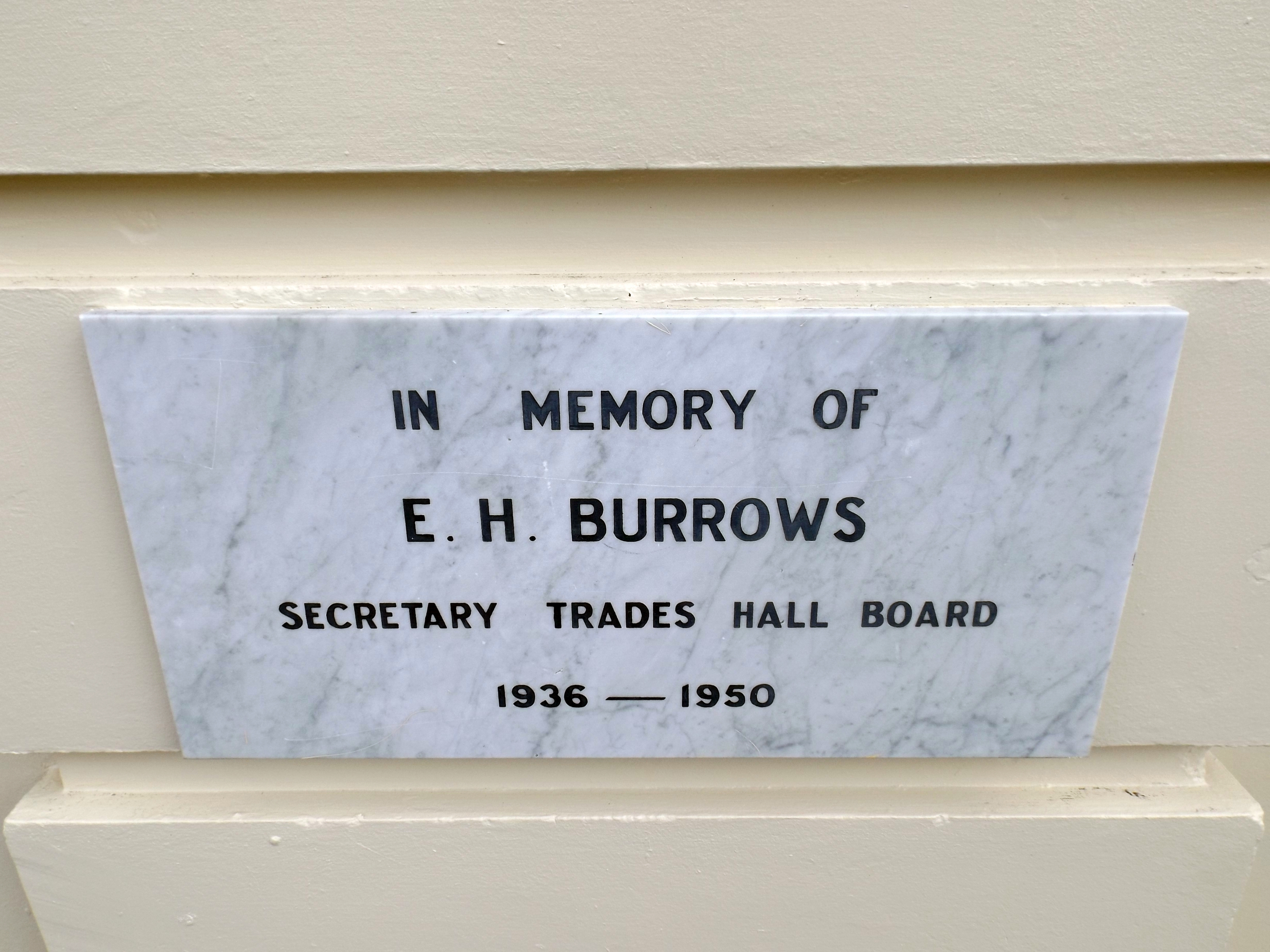
Memorial plaque

The Toowoomba Trades Hall is a two storey rectangular masonry building finished with face brick with rendered details, and sited prominently on the north side of Russell Street between Neil and Ruthven Streets.

Its principal (Russell Street) elevation is a symmetrical tripartite composition of dark red face brickwork dressed with contrasting painted cement Classical details. The central main entry is articulated with rendered architraves and flanking rusticated pilasters that extend the full height of the building to meet the parapet. The entry double door leaves have been replaced with modern glazed aluminium framed leaves. Above the main entry, a cantilevered concrete balcony with large decorative console brackets and a wrought iron balustrade doubles as an entry awning. Above the balcony, a glazed arch-headed aperture with rendered architrave extends to the underside of a rendered frieze below the parapet. Its detailed glazing pattern includes multi-paned margins (some panes fitted with coloured leadlights), three sashes and a door leaf (opening off the stair half landing within). The outer sections of the facade beyond the rusticated pilasters mirror each other. At ground level, walls are rendered and include a centrally placed single door and fanlight flanked by double hung sash windows. Above, smaller highlights align with the top of a heavy masonry transom. Physical evidence including decorative suspension rod brackets and cover flashings confirms the location of proposed awnings abutting these transoms. Window and fanlight sashes are original, but the door openings have been fitted with modern aluminium framed glazed leaves. Cantilevered balconies at first floor level are decorated to match the central balcony. Above the balconies, walls are finished in face brick with a rendered frieze decorated with widely spaced rosettes. French doors with fanlights are centrally placed and flanked by double hung sashes. Door leaves and upper sashes are multi paned. The elevation is crowned by a stepped rendered parapet decorated with cornices, consoles, and a central pediment.

Side elevations finished in face brickwork terminate as parapets to conceal the corrugated iron gabled roof and box gutters behind. The right hand (east) wall has original window openings at first floor level.

The rear elevation facing Olcott Lane is also finished with face brickwork and terminates at roof level as a gable end. A projecting face brick rear wing contains the ground level kitchen, and two upper floors housing male and female lavatories. A timber staircase with corrugated iron skillion roof and partially enclosed with corrugated metal sheeting connects landings at doorways to the hall, supper room, lavatories.

The main entrance from Russell Street leads directly into an entrance lobby. The original elevated timber floor has been altered to accommodate ramped access from street level. Flanking original walls are rendered masonry. At the far end, original opposing door openings fitted with original joinery (including three panelled door leaves with original hardware) lead to the adjacent tenancies fronting Russell Street. The right hand (east) wall is also fitted with an original multi-paned high light fixed window. The ceiling is lined with decoratively arranged fibre cement sheets and cover battens. The original staircase joinery survives intact. The lower flight rises from the far right to a half landing over the front door, and a second flight rises beyond (parallel to Russell Street) to the floor above. A small ticket office to the right is built into the stair under-croft. The adjacent tenancies contain original plain quad skirtings, rendered masonry walls, and fibre cement and batten ceilings. The ceiling panel pattern in the right hand tenancy provides evidence of an original partition wall, since removed. Later doorways have been cut through to spaces behind.

Beyond the entrance lobby, the original fit out has been substantially altered, and evidence of the original configurations of walls and partitions are preserved in the intact fibre cement sheet and battened ceiling linings and remnants of original timber framed fibre cement panelled walls. A central corridor is flanked by plasterboard walls with Silky Oak doors and fixed glazing, all dating from the early 1990s and located in the original wall alignment (underneath and between boxed in steel beams and columns). Office spaces either side of the corridor are separated by similar early 1990s partitions, but do not follow the set out of original meeting rooms evident in the ceiling.

The supper room at the rear of the building has also been reconfigured to provide extra office space to the right. The original staircase abutting the rear wall provides access to original high level double doors leading directly to the rear landing, stairs, lavatories and hall above. The masonry wall that originally separated the kitchen at the rear of the building has been substantially removed. The kitchen fit out dates from the 1990s. The former ground floor landing at the rear of the building has been enclosed and fitted out as an equitable access lavatory which opens to a small lobby below the stairs. There is clear evidence of an original doorway that lead from the kitchen to the former rear landing. The supper room contains large timber tables that predate the building.

The upper floor hall has been subdivided with timber framed plasterboard lined partitions to provide a smaller hall, a lounge adjacent to Russell Street, and a series of offices. The floor is clad with original narrow hardwood tongue and groove boards, exposed in the reduced hall area. Outer masonry walls are rendered. The ceiling has been recently lined with plasterboard. Original roof structure knee braces extending below the existing ceiling have been boxed in. Window and door openings and joinery at the front and rear of the building are original. Original window openings along the right hand side stripped of original joinery and in filled with rendered masonry and glass block work. The reduced hall area has been recently been fitted with an imitation VJ wainscot panelling. At the rear of the hall, the floor provides archaeology of earlier larger stage configurations. The existing stage is also a bulkhead providing headroom over the supper room staircase below. To the left of the stage is a semi-enclosed space fitted out as a kitchen c. 1990. The hall contains a number of timber tables that predate the building, and an early notice board containing Unions and Secretaries? Addresses. At the western end of the front lounge, a wall-mounted timber Honour Board lists past and present presidents, secretaries and trustees of the Toowoomba Trades Hall Board.

== Heritage listing ==
Toowoomba Trades Hall was listed on the Queensland Heritage Register on 29 October 2010 having satisfied the following criteria.

The place is important in demonstrating the evolution or pattern of Queensland's history.

The Toowoomba Trades Hall is important in demonstrating the development of trade unionism, a movement that has made an influential contribution to the development of Queensland. The building demonstrates the growth of the labour movement and organization of workers in Toowoomba during the 20th century and illustrates the city's longstanding historical role as the industrial centre of the Darling Downs. The building has been a central gathering place for unions and the labour movement since its opening in 1934.

The place demonstrates rare, uncommon or endangered aspects of Queensland's cultural heritage.

The Toowoomba Trades Hall is important as Queensland's oldest surviving purpose-built trades hall, having sustained its original use since opening. Trades halls were established or built in large urban settlements throughout Queensland during the twentieth century. Since this time many earlier trades halls have been demolished or are no longer used for this purpose.

The place is important in demonstrating the principal characteristics of a particular class of cultural places.

The Toowoomba Trades Hall is important in demonstrating the principal characteristics of a purpose-built trades hall. Highly intact externally, the building's scale and classical detailing successfully lend it civic prominence. Internally the provision of offices, meeting rooms, hall and associated spaces illustrates its primary function as a central gathering place associated with union-related activity. While some spaces have been altered over time to sustain the building's ongoing use, important evidence of earlier internal configurations remain.

The place is important because of its aesthetic significance.

The Toowoomba Trades Hall is of aesthetic significance for its contribution, through its scale, form, materials and design, to the visual character of the city's central business district. The building reflects the consolidation and presence of trade unionism in Toowoomba, with classical detailing on its facade associated with concepts of permanence and stability. The use of classical architectural elements in the facades of institutional buildings, town halls, banks and commercial buildings was popular in the 1920s and 1930s and contributed to Queensland's built environment.
