= APA Building =

APA Building may refer to multiple notable buildings built for the defunct insurance company Australian Provincial Assurance Association Ltd:

- APA Building, Sydney, a heritage-listed building in Martin Place, Sydney, New South Wales, Australia
- APA Building, Melbourne, a now-demolished building in Elizabeth Street
