= Great Northern Hotel, Newcastle =

Great Northern Hotel
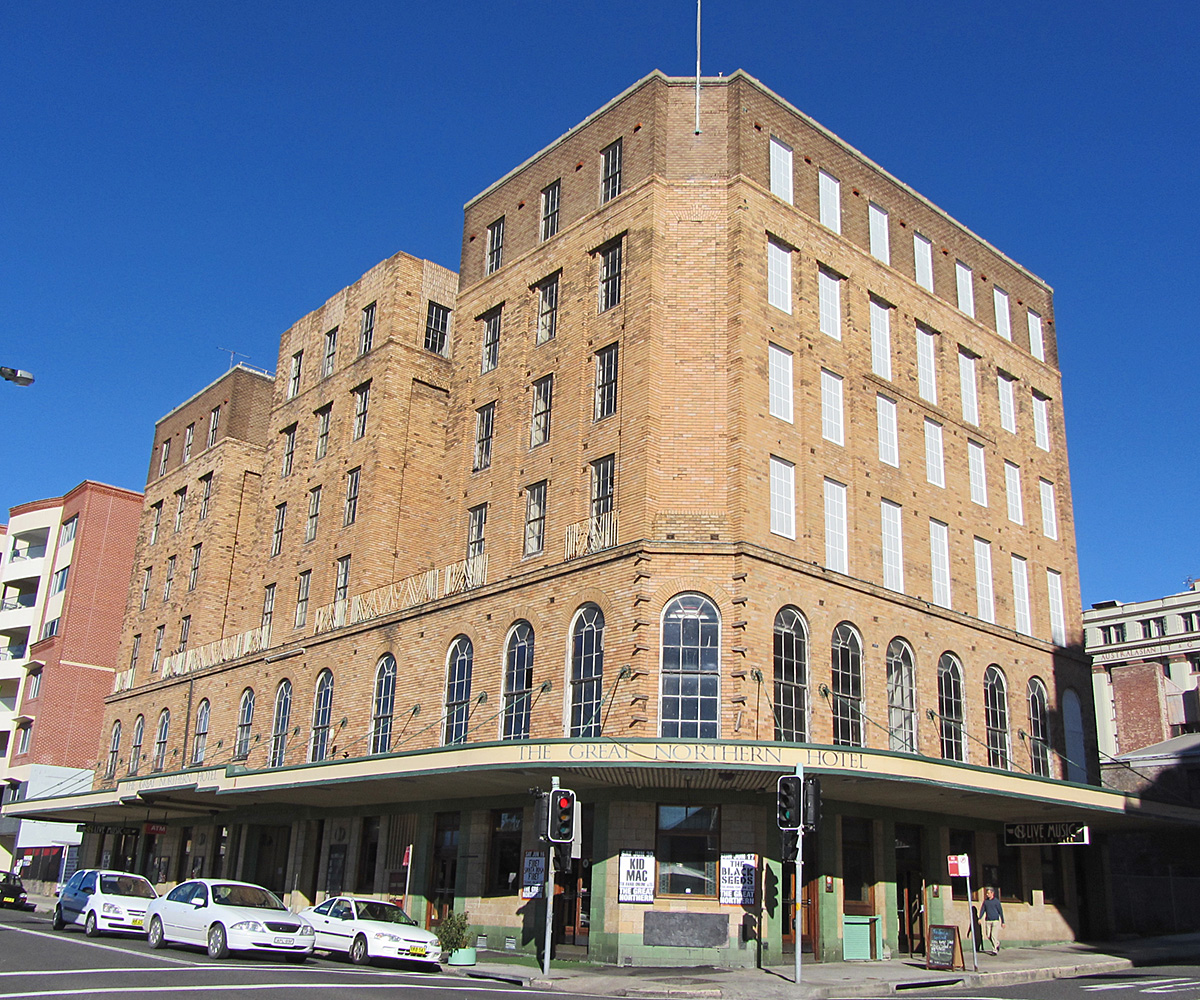

- Location within New South Wales Location within Australia
- 32.9273°S 151.7849°E
- Location: 89 Scott Street, Newcastle, City of Newcastle, New South Wales, Australia

New South Wales Heritage Register
- Official name: Great Northern Hotel
- Type: state heritage (built)
- Designated: 2 April 1999
- Reference no.: 507
- Type: historic site

Great Northern Hotel is a heritage-listed hotel at 89 Scott Street, Newcastle, New South Wales, Australia. It was added to the New South Wales State Heritage Register on 2 April 1999.

== History ==
The current Great Northern Hotel opened in February 1938. It is the third hotel of the same name to occupy the site, its predecessors having been in operation since 1863. The hotel was designed by Sydney architects Rudder and Grout and built by contractors Kell & Rigby.

The hotel was a prominent feature of Newcastle nightlife through the twentieth century. It has been described as "once Newcastle's grandest and most luxurious hotel". Actress Susie Porter was a barmaid at the hotel while studying at university.

Owners during the 1970s and 1980s struggled with the cost of upkeep of the heritage hotel. The hotel was then damaged in the 1989 Newcastle earthquake, after which the upper levels of the hotel were closed.

The hotel closed in 1993 after a dispute between the owner and council over fire regulations, and suffered significant damage due to vandalism in the subsequent years, with most items of value stripped from the building. A multimillion-dollar refurbishment under a new lessee began in 1996, which after delays due to disputes with the council over incentives and assistance eventually saw the ground floor of the hotel reopen as an Irish-themed pub in November 1999.

In March 2000, the NSW Heritage Council took legal action against the lessee, claiming that unauthorised works had been undertaken on two bars on the lower level and the lobby. It was the first time criminal proceedings had been launched under the Heritage Act, though the power to use them had existed since 1977. The developer delayed plans to refurbish the first floor of the building as a result of the litigation. In January 2001, the lessee opened a linked nightclub in the adjacent former Tattersall's Club building. In March 2001, the owners lost the Heritage Act case, resulting in the lessee being discharged without a conviction, but facing a $5000 fine and $13,000 in court costs.

In 2002, a dispute between the hotel owner and lessee wound up in the New South Wales Court of Appeal, with the owner attempting to have the lessee evicted. The owner won on both first instance and a September appeal, resulting in the hotel's closure on 31 October 2002 after the lessee was formally evicted. The hotel was subsequently sold to Kurt Braune.

The hotel reopened under new ownership on 28 March 2003, having been stripped of the Irish pub fitout. The owners proposed the refurbishment of the upper levels in 2005 and got development approval in 2008, but were delayed by the 2008 financial crisis. The hotel was described in 2007 as having been "allowed to fall into a state of significant disrepair". It reopened under new lessees after another period of closure and repairs on New Year's Eve 2009. Braune sold the hotel to Sydney developer Bass Elhashem in 2013, but remained involved with the refurbishment as project manager.

In October 2015, Elhashem announced another proposal to refurbish the hotel. The proposal hit a problem in 2017 when the owners were informed that they would have to build a substation in order to connect power to the upper floors, but was resolved by an agreement to share facilities with an adjoining building. In January 2018, the owners applied to build a cantilevered swimming pool over Scott Street as part of an extension to the building. The refurbished building reopened in November 2018.

== Description ==
The Great Northern Hotel is a six-storey Art Deco hotel consisting of a central wing and two side wings (initially five-storey, later increased to six). It is a dominant element of the townscape. It has a rare "Jazz style" interior.

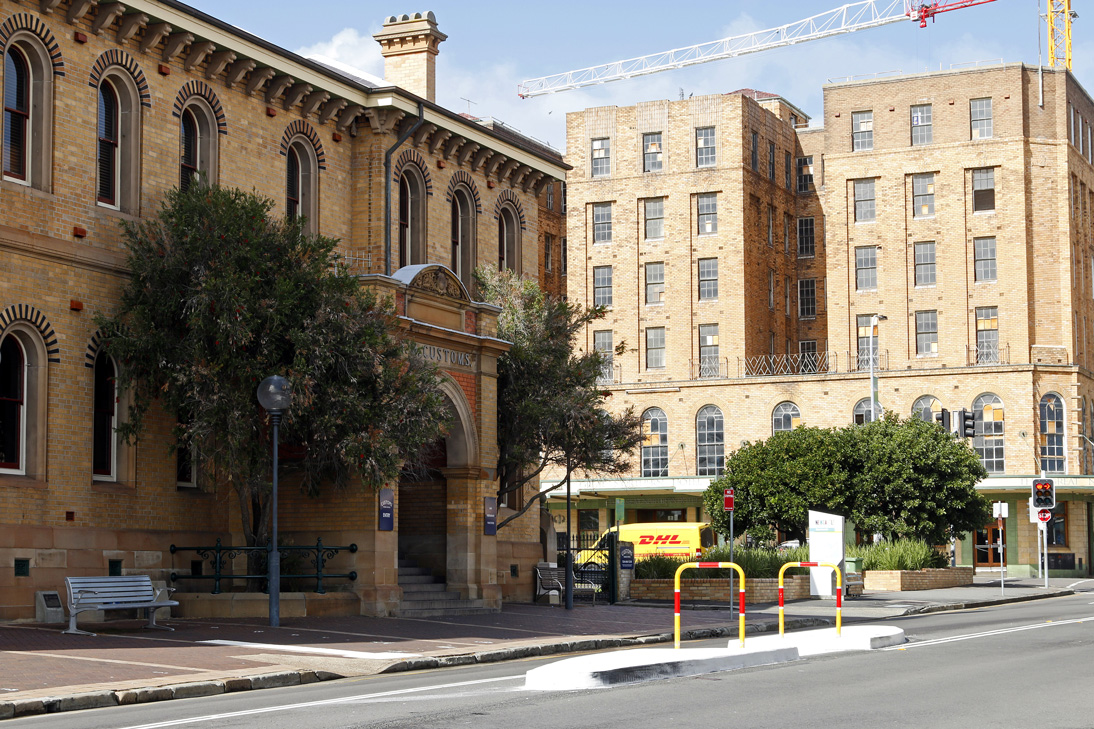
Customs House, Watt Street, Newcastle, NSW, looking towards the Great Northern Hotel. Corner across from the old Newcastle train station

The original shape of the building has been altered by the 1950s additions to the wings.

== Heritage listing ==
Great Northern Hotel was listed on the New South Wales State Heritage Register on 2 April 1999.
