= Inquiry into Construction Industry Insolvency in NSW =

The Inquiry into Construction Industry Insolvency in NSW was an inquiry established on 9 August 2012 by the state government of New South Wales in the aftermath of the financial collapse of a number of well established building /construction companies. These included Reed Constructions, Hastie Group, Kell & Rigby and St Hilliers. The inquiry's stated purpose was to "safeguard the interests of sub-contractors in the sector". Sub–contractors had not been paid A$1 billion dollars.

The inquiry was chaired by Bruce Collins, a Queen's Counsel. Collins has been an Independent Commission Against Corruption (ICAC) commissioner, and a Supreme Court Evaluator and Court Referee. He represents Australia on the International Chamber of Commerce’s International Court of Arbitration.

The views of any interested parties were sought. Submissions closed on 14 September 2012.

The Inquiry’s final report was published on 28 January 2013. It made 44 recommendations.

== Sources ==
- Govt. inquiry into Perle insolvency. 14 August 2012 coffscoastadvocate.com.au Coffs Coast Advocate Retrieved 11 September 2012
- "Media release: Government Inquiry into Construction Projects" (261 KB) (pdf), New South Wales Government, Retrieved 11 September 2012
- "Terms of Reference" (26 KB) (pdf), New South Wales Government, Retrieved 11 September 2012
- "Media Release: Submissions Called for Construction Inquiry "- 20/8/12 (274 KB) (pdf), Greg Pearce MLC (Minister for Finance and Services), Retrieved 11 September 2012
- "Media Release: Strong Industry Support for Building Inquiry "- 27/08/12 (82 KB) (pdf), Greg Pearce MLC, Retrieved 11 September 2012
