= Clarence Street Police Station =

Clarence Street Police Station (former)
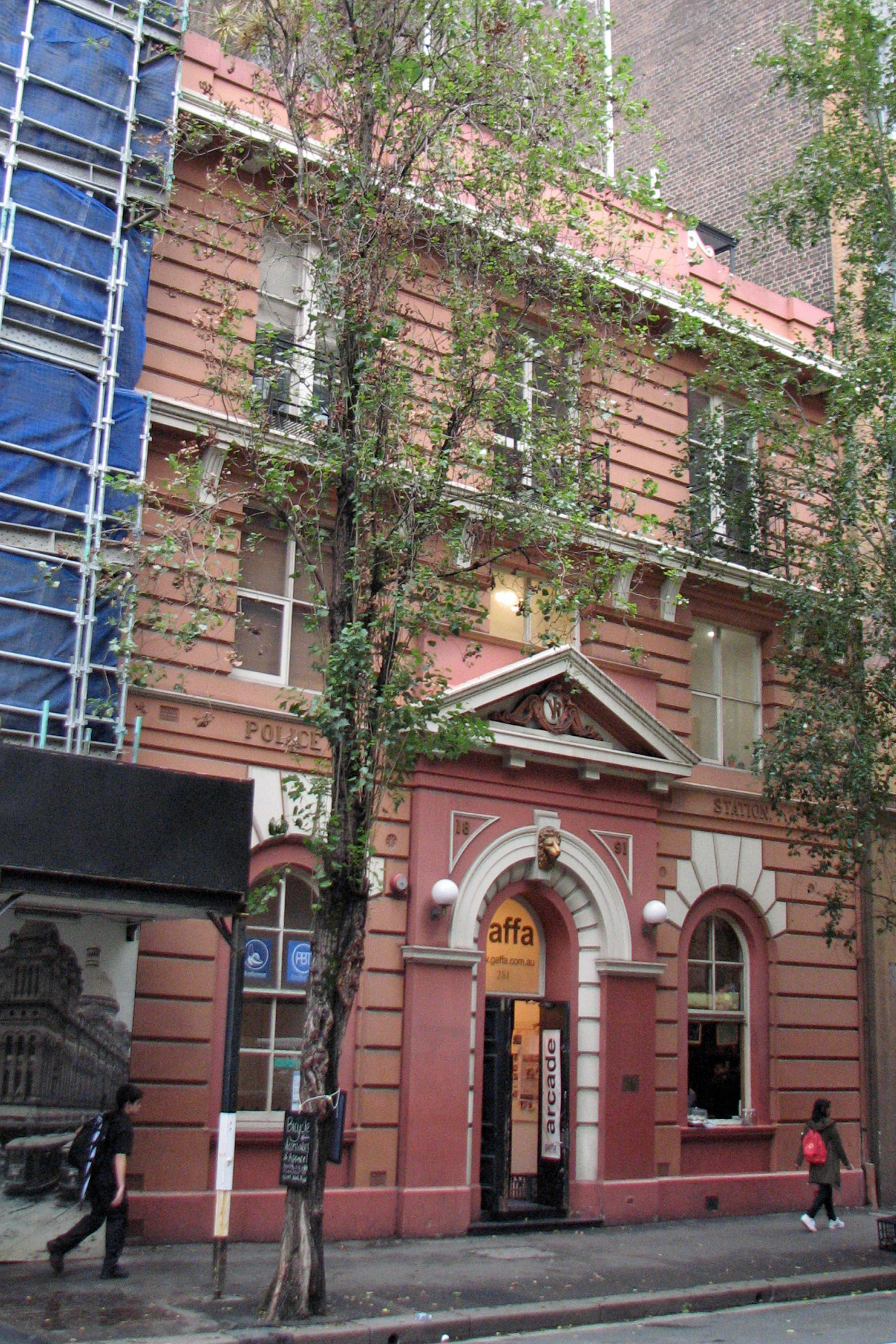
- Former Police Station at 281 Clarence Street, Sydney

- Location within Sydney Location within Australia
- 33.8724°S 151.2055°E
- Location: 281 Clarence Street, Sydney, New South Wales, Australia

History
- Built: 1890–1928

Site notes
- Architect(s): James Barnet; NSW Government Architect

New South Wales Heritage Register
- Official name: Police Station (former); Police Station
- Type: State heritage (built)
- Designated: 2 April 1999
- Reference no.: 293
- Type: Police station
- Category: Law Enforcement
- Builders: Unknown

The Clarence Street Police Station is a heritage-listed former police station and now community service office located at 281 Clarence Street, Sydney, Australia. It was designed by James Barnet as the NSW Government Architect and was built from 1890 to 1928. It was added to the New South Wales State Heritage Register on 2 April 1999.

== History ==
Sydney's wharf area, from Woolloomooloo around to Millers Point and Pyrmont was an important work and residential centre for men and women whose occupations were linked to the docks. During the 1890s the Depression and the crucial industrial Strikes made the area a focus for confrontations between workers and employers, The strong and visible presence of police was an Important government strategy in cleating with striking workers and their families.

The Police Station at 281 Clarence Street was constructed In 1891 at a major point In the industrial battle between labour and employers. Situated near the Darling Harbour docks it was a potent reminder of the potential threat posed by the government to strikers and discontented workers. A two-storey building was designed by the government architect, James Barnet. A third floor was added in 1928. The building remained in use as a police station until 1967 when it was closed and the property was sold. It has been used as commercial space since that time.

=== Alterations ===
- 1922: Additional accommodation erected at the rear
- 1923: Electric light installed;
- c. 1928: Second floor level added;
- c. 1985: Refurbishment including removal of much of the ground floor fit-out including cells.

== Description ==
281 Clarence Street is a small 4-storey office building (G - 3) which was originally a police station. The façade carries the date 1891. It has three floors of similar size, the third floor being set back by the width of a terrace from the east façade. There is an atrium down through the centre of the building for its full height. It has frontage to Clarence Street on the east, and a small part of the west and south perimeter walls are exposed in a lightwell at the southwest corner, but for the rest of the perimeter there are adjacent buildings which are higher than the subject building. There are no windows from this building overlooking the lightwell. The construction is of brickwork, rendered and painted, with timber floors at most levels as far as could be determined. The ceilings of much of the ground floor, in rooms which used to be the police cells, are barrel vaulted brickwork. The roof above the 3rd floor, on either side of the atrium, is of metal deck galvanised steel KlipLok sheeting, which drains to box gutters on each side of the atrium roof. Several items of plant are located on both halves of the roof. The roof of the atrium is 45° pitched glazing, with glass louvres in a clerestory arrangement along each side of it. There is opaque flat glazing near the base of the atrium, at the level of the second floor. There is a fire stair near the north-east corner of the building. One wall of this is exposed at the 3rd floor because of the terrace setback. The third floor terrace has a terracotta tiled surface. It is bounded by a heavy rendered brick parapet on the east, the walls of the third floor on the west, and neighbouring buildings to north and south. Glazing in the building is of various types, as far as we could determine. The atrium roof is mostly of monolithic fully toughened glass. The fire stair at the 3 floor terrace has two wired glass windows. The full-height glazing looking into the atrium on the 3 floor is laminated ordinary annealed, and all the remainder appears to be monolithic ordinary annealed, ranging from small individual panes in multi-panelled sash windows, to full height glazing to the 3 floor for much of the terrace area. Window framing is a combination of timber (all east-face windows from ground to 2 floor level), aluminium (atrium roof and the 3 floor office glazing facing onto the terrace, and steel (fire stair windows at 3rd floor level. Casement windows open into the north and south sides of the atrium at 1 and floors, while the east and west ends of the atrium at these floors are open, protected by a balustrade. The 1st and 2 floor windows are double hung timber sashes, the 2nd floor being a 3-part window rather than the more common 2-part. There are three small Juliet balconies at 3 floor, steel structures bearing on a projecting cornice and fixed back to the masonry at the window sides. These are accessible by climbing out through the windows, however they are scarcely big enough for one person to stand on, and are for decorative and maintenance purposes only.

=== Condition ===
As at 19 December 2005, a brief description of the physical condition (excellent, good, fair, poor) or archaeological potential (high, medium or low). Evaluation of the integrity and/or authenticity of the item is carried out as part of the assessment process on page 4.

=== Modifications and dates ===
- 1891 – construction completed, then addition of 3rd storey;
- 1923 – Electric light installed;
- c. 1928 – second floor level added;
- 1982-83 – 4th storey added;
- c. 1985 – refurbishment including removal of much of the ground floor fit out included cells;
- 1992 – Additional accommodation erected at the rear;
- 2000 – an extensive refurbishment.

== Heritage listing ==
As at 12 August 2013, 281 Clarence Street is of architectural significance as a good and rare example of a modest Victorian Police Station in central Sydney. It was designed by prominent Government Architect J. Barnet who was responsible for the design of many civic buildings, including the GPO and the Castlereagh Street Fire Station. The building has historic, aesthetic and social value for its well designed façade including the 1928 additions, and has historic significance as the most intact former metropolitan Police Station building even though it has been altered and used for offices. The building has social value documenting law and order in the nineteenth century.

The Police Station was listed on the New South Wales State Heritage Register on 2 April 1999 having satisfied the following criteria:

The place is important in demonstrating the course, or pattern, of cultural or natural history in New South Wales.

281 Clarence Street is of architectural significance as a good and rare example of a modest Victonan Police Station in central Sydney. It was designed by prominent Government Architect J. Barnet who was responsible for the design of many civic buildings, including the GPO and the Castlereagh Street Fire Station.

The place is important in demonstrating aesthetic characteristics and/or a high degree of creative or technical achievement in New South Wales.

The strong Victorian symmetrical design and typical Barnet detailing contribute to the streetscape and provide a contrast to the larger commercial buildings which surround it from various periods.

The place has a strong or special association with a particular community or cultural group in New South Wales for social, cultural or spiritual reasons.

The former Police Station demonstrates the importance of social order in nineteenth century Sydney that survived well into the second half of this century.

The place has potential to yield information that will contribute to an understanding of the cultural or natural history of New South Wales.

An item has potential to yield information that will contribute to an understanding of NSW's cultural or natural history.

== See also ==
- Architecture of Sydney
- Australian non-residential architectural styles
