= Kell & Rigby =

Defunct Australian construction company

- Industry: Construction
- Founded: June 1910
- Founder: William Kell; Alexander Rigby
- Defunct: February 2012
- Headquarters: Sydney, Australia
- Area served: Australian Capital Territory; New South Wales; Queensland
- Website: www.kellrigby.com

Kell & Rigby was an Australian construction company.

== History ==
Kell & Rigby was founded in June 1910 by William Kell and Alexander Rigby in Burwood, Sydney. After starting in house building it delivered the landmark Grace Building in Sydney in 1930.

In June 2009 New South Wales-based builder Brisland was acquired. In February 2012 Kell & Rigby was placed in administration and subsequently liquidated. The liquidation was subject to the Inquiry into Construction Industry Insolvency in NSW.

== Major projects ==
Notable projects undertaken included:

- Grace Building, Sydney, completed in 1930
- Empire Theatre, Toowoomba, completed in 1933
- Anzac Memorial, Sydney, completed in 1934
- Toowoomba Trades Hall, completed in 1934
- APA Building, Sydney, completed in 1936
- North Sydney Olympic Pool, completed in 1936
- Pigott's Building, completed in 1936
- St Stephen's Uniting Church, Sydney, completed in 1937
- 354 George Street, Sydney, completed in 1937
- Great Northern Hotel, Newcastle, completed in 1938
- Kingaroy Shire Council Chambers, completed in 1938
- Masel Residence, Stanthorpe, completed in 1938
- Red Cross House, Sydney, completed in 1938
- Kingaroy Peanut Silos, completed in 1951
- Parliament House, Canberra, House of Representatives and Senate chamber, completed in 1988
