= Empire Theatre, Toowoomba =

The Empire Theatre
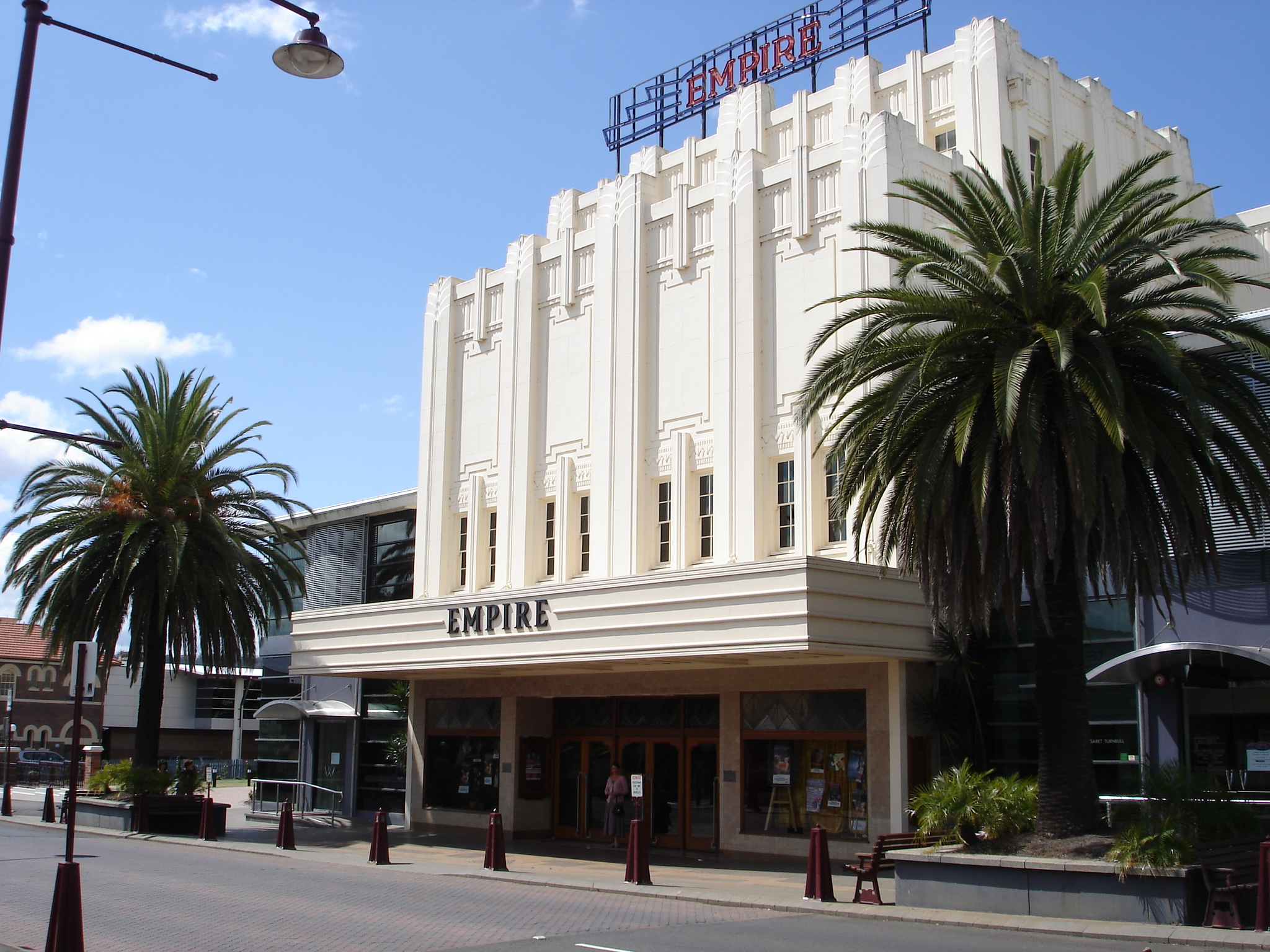
- Empire Theatre facade

- Location within Queensland Location within Australia
- 27.5631°S 151.9558°E
- Location: 56 & 56A Neil Street, Toowoomba, Toowoomba Region, Queensland, Australia

History
- Design period: 1900–1914 (early 20th century)
- Built: 1911–1990s

Site notes
- Architect: Hall & Phillips
- Architectural style: Art Deco
- Owner: Toowoomba Regional Council

Queensland Heritage Register
- Official name: Empire Theatre (former), Empire Theatre
- Type: state heritage (built)
- Designated: 31 May 1994
- Reference no.: 600978
- Significant period: 1911, 1933, 1973–74, c. 1997 (fabric); 1911–1971 (social)
- Significant components: dress circle, foyer – dress circle, proscenium arch, foyer – entrance, stage/sound shell, auditorium
- Builders: Kell & Rigby

Empire Theatre, Toowoomba
- Interactive map of the Empire Theatre, Toowoomba area

Other information
- Seating capacity: 1,561

The Empire Theatre is a heritage-listed theatre at 56 & 56A Neil Street, Toowoomba, Toowoomba Region, Queensland, Australia. It was added to the Queensland Heritage Register on 31 May 1994.

The design of the building is art deco in style, reminiscent of the "glory days" of Hollywood with palm trees framing the exterior and two plinth-mounted fish tanks in the metallic gold and bronze of the entry foyer. One of the Empire Theatre's most striking features is the grand proscenium arch.

The stage is over 13 metres (43 ft) wide and 12 metres (39 ft) deep with approximately 20 metres (66 ft) to the grid and more than 15 metres (49 ft) of wing space combined. It has 80 fly lines including 7 overhead lighting bars and an orchestra pit that can be hydraulically raised to audience floor or stage thrust levels.

== History ==
The present Empire Theatre consists of two layers of development, with the bulk of the fabric and design dating to 1933, but incorporating substantial sections of an earlier theatre which was erected on the site in 1911. Essentially, the Empire Theatre is a large, 1933, purpose-designed, Art Deco picture theatre.

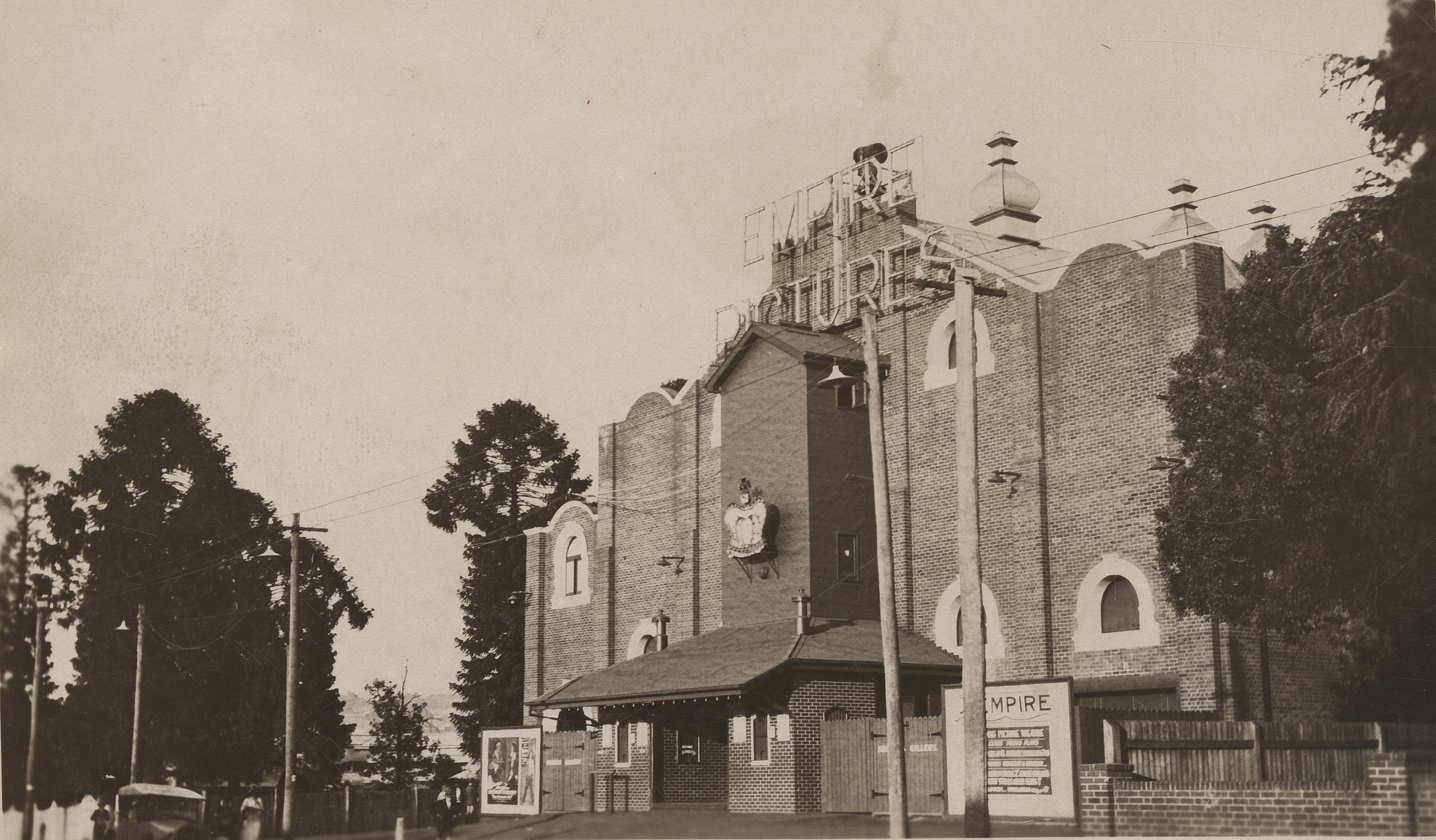
First Empire Theatre (1911–1933)

The first Empire Theatre, a large masonry picture theatre with a seating capacity of 2,200, was opened on 29 June 1911, and proved enormously successful. It was built for an association of six Toowoomba businessmen and Brisbane entertainment promoter EJ Carroll (later one of the principals of Queensland's home-grown Birch, Carroll & Coyle picture theatre chain), who had commenced screening films in Toowoomba's large Austral Hall in Margaret Street in 1909. The screenings were so popular that the erection of a purpose-designed picture theatre was inevitable. Titles to the Neil Street site were transferred to members of the association in 1910, and ultimately to Empire Theatre Ltd in 1911.

The 1911 theatre was designed by architect George Lane, formerly employed by Toowoomba architects James Marks and his son Harry James Marks from c. 1900 until 1906, and in partnership with Harry James Marks in 1909–10. The contractor was Henry Andrews. The design incorporated a proscenium stage, and the movies shared early programmes with vaudeville acts. The building was renovated in 1928, and in the following year sound equipment was installed. The first "talkie" seen in Toowoomba - The Jazz Singer (US, 1927) – was screened at the Empire Theatre on 2 September 1929. By 1933, Dan Carroll had replaced EJ Carroll in Empire Theatre Ltd, and it would appear that the Empire was associated with the Birch, Carroll & Coyle theatre chain.

The first Empire Theatre, to which the Toowoomba community had developed a strong attachment, was destroyed by fire on 22 February 1933. Almost immediately a design for a new Empire Theatre, to cost approximately £30,000, was commissioned by the owners. In the interim, Empire Theatre Ltd leased the Town Hall for their film screenings.

Designs for the new theatre were prepared by the well-known Brisbane architectural firm of TR Hall & LB Phillips (1929–48). Tenders were called in April 1933 and the contract was let Kell & Rigby, of Sydney, Brisbane and Toowoomba, in May. Substantial sections of the 1911 brick walling had survived the fire, and much of this was incorporated into the new building. Accommodating 2,500 patrons, the second Empire Theatre was Queensland's largest provincial theatre, and second only in seating capacity to Brisbane's Regent. Nationally, the Empire was exceeded in size only by the State, Regent, and St Kilda Palais theatres in Melbourne, the State and Capitol theatres in Sydney, and the Brisbane Regent.

Of particular note was the use of 70 long tons (71 t) of structural steel to frame the large gallery which spans the width of the theatre. The structural engineer was CW Alexander of Hurren, Alexander and Langman of Brisbane, Sydney and Adelaide, and the fabricators were Evans Deakin & Co. Ltd of Brisbane. The steel members were fabricated in sections in Brisbane, transported by Queensland Rail to Toowoomba, and assembled (riveted) on site. At the time of construction, it was considered an exceedingly intricate piece of structural engineering, unique in Queensland, and a "triumph" in steel construction.

The new theatre blended contemporary art deco style with picture palace ethos, much of the romantic atmosphere being conveyed by European-styled diffused lighting. Of particular note was that not a single column interrupted audience view of stage or screen. The bio box was the largest in Queensland; acoustics were excellent; and the theatre contained one of the largest provincial stages in Australia, attracting all types of performance from vaudeville to opera. To accommodate large stage productions, the new design incorporated a large stage, fly tower and dressing rooms.

Edward Gold, the theatre's chief electrician and founder of radio station 4GR at Toowoomba, was responsible for the most striking of the interior features: the illumination of the grand proscenium arch in constantly changing colours. This was achieved by reflecting diffused light from the wall behind the arch, which was constructed of plaster open-work, and changing the colours via a complex dimmer system. As well, a huge central lamp of wrought iron and obscure glass ran much of the length of the main ceiling, distributing a soft even light throughout the auditorium. In 1933, local press claimed the Empire Theatre employed the most extensive use of diffused lighting in any theatre in the British Commonwealth, and was unlike anything else in Australia.

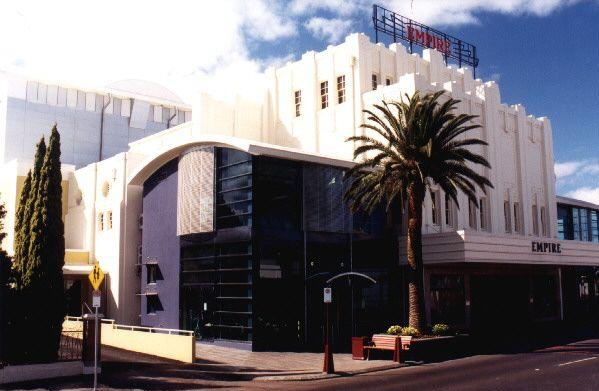
Empire Theatre exterior, 2005

Empire Theatre Ltd advertised proudly that most of the contractors and materials were of local (Brisbane and Toowoomba) origin. The decorative fibrous plaster work was carried out by Brisbane's Stucoid Modelling Co., terrazzo work by Melocco Brothers of Brisbane, and cork flooring and tiling supplied by the Decorative Tile Co., Brisbane. Joinery and furnishings were supplied by Toowoomba firms. Cemuro art stucco, a new product to Queensland, was supplied by Dyne & Co. of Brisbane. Billed as the "theatre supreme", the new Empire Theatre opened on 27 November 1933. It was tied into the Metro-Goldwyn-Mayer exhibition network in Australia, screening in the 1930s the films of Greta Garbo, Clark Gable, Jean Harlow, Jeanette MacDonald and Nelson Eddy, Laurel and Hardy, and the Flash Gordon serials.

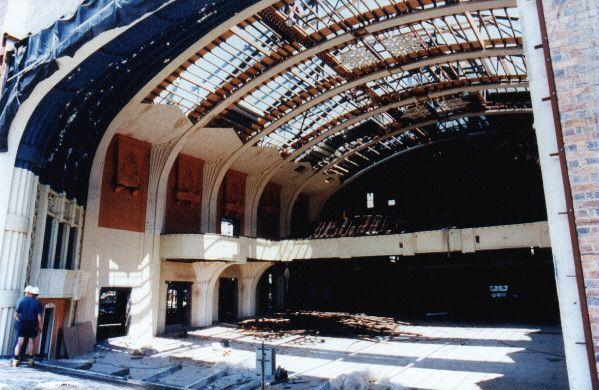
Empire Theatre construction, 2005

In 1942 during World War II, when the threat of Japanese air raids was a perceived reality, the large central ceiling light (affectionately dubbed the 'bomber' light) was removed as a safety precaution (locals fearing that a bomb would send a shower of glass onto theatre patrons below), and has never been recovered. Similarly, three fittings, in the same design, below the Dress Circle, were removed. The cinema was closed during parts of World War 2.

In the 1950s a CinemaScope screen was installed, with no widening of the stage necessary. Audiences declined, however, in the 1960s, mainly due to the impact of television. The last film was screened in the Empire on 1 April 1971. The auditorium seating was removed when the theatre closed, but most of the Dress Circle seats remained.

In 1973, Empire Theatre Pty Ltd sold the Empire to two Toowoomba businessmen. The front shop additions were erected in 1973–74, and the building was occupied for about a year by Waltons Pty Ltd, a departmental retailer. In 1975 it was acquired by the Queensland Government for Technical College purposes, and has been used more recently as a TAFE facility.

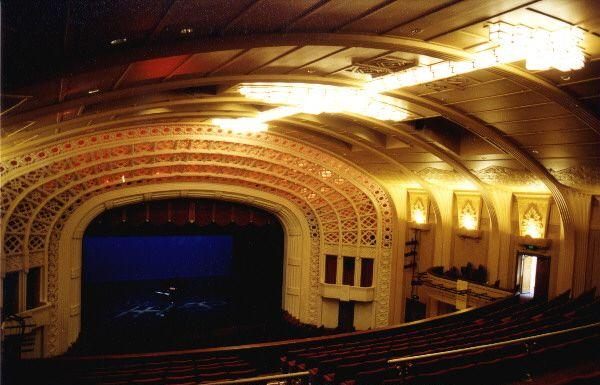
Empire Theatre interior, 2005

After being purchased by the Toowoomba City Council (now Toowoomba Regional Council), the theatre was restored and returned to its 1933 art deco styling with state-of-the-art technical equipment and patron comforts in June 1997. As a result, in 1998 the Empire Theatre awarded "The Best Theatre in Australia" by the Australian Leisure Management Magazine that placed it amongst the top eight leisure and entertainment projects in Australia.

In 2005, a Conference Precinct extension was built to connect the Empire Theatre with the adjacent Church Theatre (circa 1879) incorporating a 5 star restaurant, foyer and storage areas.

In 2009, the Empire Theatre established its Projects Company to increase the breadth and depth of the community's connection with the performing arts in the Toowoomba Regional Council area, launching 'Empire Youth Arts' in 2010 with the aim to create opportunities for young people from diverse backgrounds through the region to engage with the performing arts.

The Empire Theatre celebrated its centenary year in 2011.

The venue has a capacity of 1,565 seats, and is the largest proscenium arch theatre in regional Australia. It is also often referred to as one of the best performing arts venues in Australia by the many visiting artists that perform on its stage.

== Description ==
The Empire Theatre is located in Neil Street, Toowoomba, and is bounded on its north side by the Wesley Uniting Church, and by the Masonic Lodge on the south side. Both these buildings, which have historic value, are set well back off the street. This accentuates the Empire Theatre's dominant form in the streetscape. Directly to the east of the theatre are located contemporary single-storeyed brick buildings associated with the TAFE College use. Further to the east of these is a three-storeyed teaching block c. 1970 and behind this a single-storeyed teaching block which runs through to Hume Street.

The Empire Theatre's elevation facing Neil Street is in a 1930s Art Deco style finished in plain plaster work over brick. The form of this section of the building is a simple cube with a step back at the front to form a parapet. The height of the building is accentuated by the use of equally positioned projecting pilaster elements running across the front, down the sides and across what was the front of the 1911 theatre. The tops of these pilasters are finished in a pattern resembling palm fronds, the trunk of which extends down the face of each pilaster. In the panels between the pilasters are located two narrow windows at first floor foyer level which are divided by a projecting decorated mullion that extends above and below the windows. Geometrically decorated panels are located in these positions. Above this is a large rectangular panel with border, and above this at parapet level a further decorative panel divided by a profiled projecting truncated dummy pilaster. The front wall to the bio box is set back and is detailed in the same fashion with windows and decorative panels between palm frond topped pilasters. Above the parapet is the Empire sign, a linear jazz detail in ironwork, with neon lettering.

The awning which originally ran down the sides of the foyer and across the northwest and southwest exists now only over the footpath. Both sides of the foyer have been infilled by later development. Other than this change the integrity of the building remains high. Below the awning are the original timber and bevelled glass front doors which are intact as are the show cases at each side.

The external walls of the building are brick and incorporate some of the 1911 theatre that was destroyed by fire. These include the side walls, part of the front wall, and a substantial part of the rear wall of the auditorium. The "baroque" detailing of the 1911 theatre windows in the side walls can still be observed.

The fly tower which extends to a height of 90 feet (27 m) is constructed in timber with corrugated galvanised iron cladding. The roof is divided in two sections with the highest level having a hipped roof and lower half a gable form. The tower only extends to three-quarters the width of the auditorium with the remaining area taken up by a skillion roof. The original working drawings show a single structure as wide as the auditorium with a skillion roof and a glazed ventilated cupola, but changes occurred during the construction phase.

The deep profile corrugated fibrous cement main roof is supported on single span steel trusses which have a segmentally curved bottom chord and have been manufactured from riveted angle iron sections. The bottom chord of the trusses are clad in fibrous plaster that sweeps down the walls and over iron supporting stanchions. The ceiling which follows the curve is lined with Craftex, a proprietary fibrous board. This material has been used extensively on the walls and ceilings inside the auditorium for its sound absorption qualities. Perforated fibrous plaster vents are located down the centre of the auditorium ceiling that connect to five ridge vents.

The Dress Circle is supported on a riveted truss that spans 70 feet (21 m) supported at the side isles by steel stanchions and provides an uninterrupted view of the stage. Six cantilevered girders extend 24 feet (7.3 m) beyond the line of the truss and connecting girders slope back from it to the rear wall of the auditorium. This steel frame carries a timber floor and Craftex ceilings below, with the fibrous plaster covering the beams and two stanchions. The steel construction was notable at the time and reported on in the October 1934 edition of Building.

The proscenium arch is constructed in a perforated pattern of fibrous plaster over a timber frame. It is noted for its size and the lighting effects that were a feature.

The theatre retains evidence of the original lighting system, including lighting switchboards at front of house and in the bio-box, large porcelain dimmers, and the proscenium arch lighting grid. Several original lighting fixtures also survive.

== Heritage listing ==
The former Empire Theatre was listed on the Queensland Heritage Register on 31 May 1994 having satisfied the following criteria.

The place is important in demonstrating the evolution or pattern of Queensland's history.

With the fly-tower intact, the Empire Theatre is important in exemplifying the early symbiosis of stage and film theatre. The building is important historically for its close association with the expansion of mass entertainment in Queensland in the first half of the 20th century, and survives as rare and important evidence of the increasingly sophisticated expectations of interwar cinema audiences.

The place demonstrates rare, uncommon or endangered aspects of Queensland's cultural heritage.

The building is important historically for its close association with the expansion of mass entertainment in Queensland in the first half of the 20th century, and survives as rare and important evidence of the increasingly sophisticated expectations of interwar cinema audiences.

The place is important in demonstrating the principal characteristics of a particular class of cultural places.

Nationally, it remains one of the largest and one of the most intact Art Deco provincial picture theatres, and is the finest Art Deco picture theatre surviving in Queensland. It has technological significance for the use of riveted steel girders in the construction of the Dress Circle, and retains evidence of theatre lighting and film projection technologies of the interwar period.

The place is important because of its aesthetic significance.

The Empire Theatre is an outstanding example of Art Deco theatre architecture in Australia, exhibiting fine exterior and interior Art Deco detailing of aesthetic importance. The building makes a major contribution to the Neil Street streetscape, and is a Toowoomba icon and landmark.

The place is important in demonstrating a high degree of creative or technical achievement at a particular period.

It has technological significance for the use of riveted steel girders in the construction of the Dress Circle, and retains evidence of theatre lighting and film projection technologies of the interwar period.

The place has a strong or special association with a particular community or cultural group for social, cultural or spiritual reasons.

The theatre has had an important and special association with Toowoomba as a major entertainment venue from 1911 to 1971, being particularly important in the development of film culture in the Toowoomba district.

The place has a special association with the life or work of a particular person, group or organisation of importance in Queensland's history.

It demonstrates the range of expertise of established Brisbane architects TR Hall & LB Phillips, and survives as a monument to Queensland craftsmanship and local technology.
