= Red Cross House =

Heritage building in Sydney, New South Wales, Australia

Red Cross House (now 155 Clarence Street)
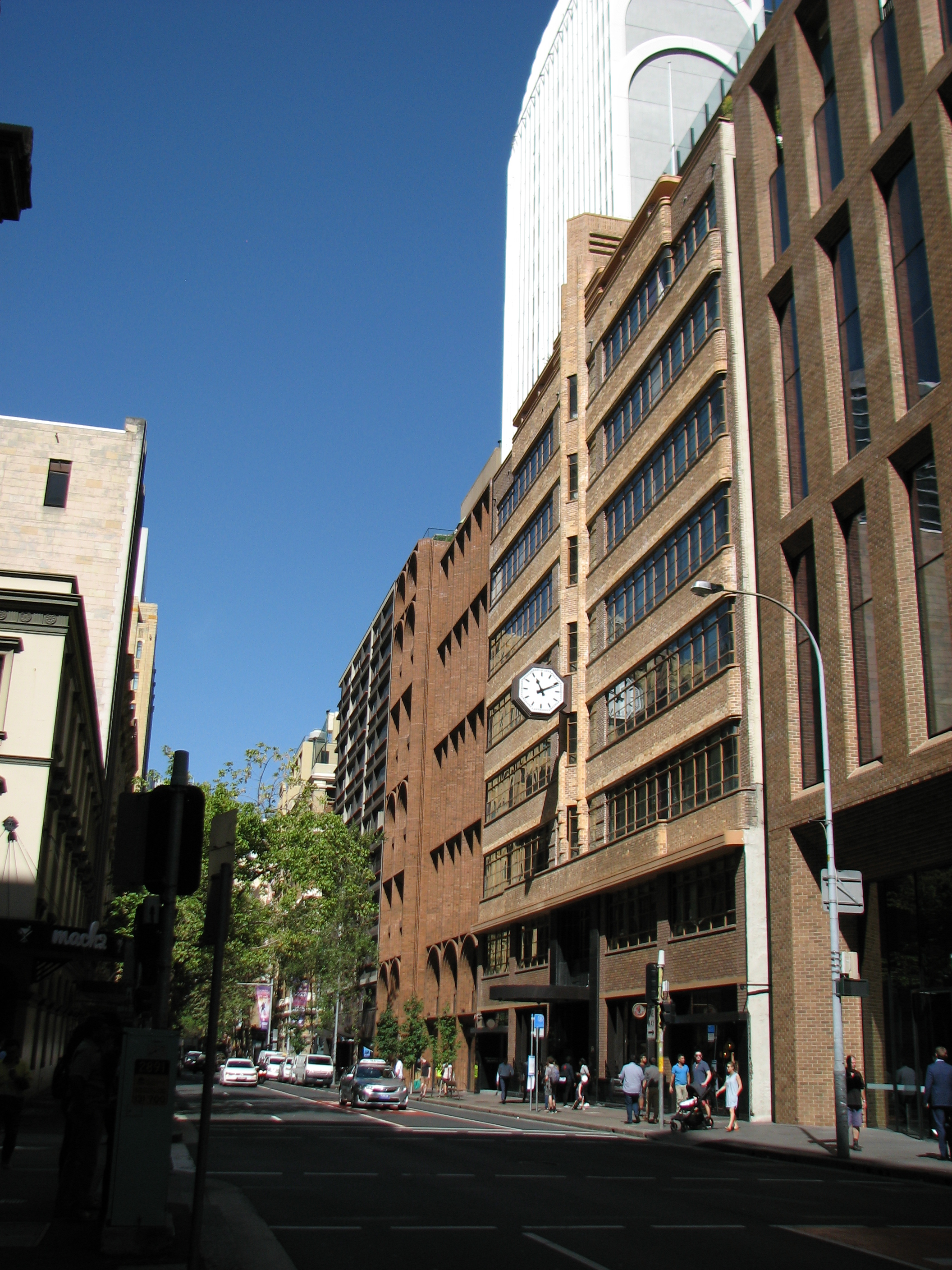
- Red Cross House is the building with the clock

- Location within Sydney Location within Australia
- 33.8680°S 151.2048°E
- Location: 153—159 Clarence Street, Sydney, New South Wales, Australia

History
- Built: 1937—1938

Site notes
- Architect(s): Samuel Lipson; architect; in conjunction with Robertson, Marks and McCredie

New South Wales Heritage Register
- Official name: Red Cross House; S. Hoffnung & Co.
- Type: State heritage (built)
- Designated: 25 May 2001
- Reference no.: 1511
- Type: Warehouse/storage area
- Category: Commercial
- Builders: Kell & Rigby; structural engineer: R. E. McMillan

The Red Cross House (now known as 155 Clarence Street) is a heritage-listed former commercial and warehouse building, and a former Australian Red Cross and blood transfusion centre (1974—2010), located at 153—159 Clarence Street, Sydney, New South Wales, Australia. It was designed by Samuel Lipson, architect, in conjunction with Robertson and Marks and McCredie and built from 1937 to 1938 by Kell & Rigby. It was originally built for the merchant and importers firm of S. Hoffnung & Co.

== History ==
=== Warehousing west of the central business district ===
During the late 19th century and up to the 1950s, the area west of the Sydney central business district, that is west of George Street through to the former wharves on Darling Harbour, was characterised by businesses with functions and services associated with import and export, textile and clothing manufacturers, etc.

The redevelopment of this area from its predominant early to mid-19th century-use as a residential quarter commenced in the 1860s. The 1880s consolidated Clarence, Kent and York streets as 'the great warehousing streets' of Sydney. After the economic downturn of the 1890s, the pent up demand for warehousing in the first decade of this century resulted in another building boom of large five to seven storey buildings. These new warehouses often also resulted on the consolidation of the smaller residential sized allotments of about 10 perches.

=== Occupants and owners ===
The firm of S. Hoffnung & Co. was established in 1853 by Sigmond Hoffnung (1830—1904) a Polish migrant who arrived in Sydney in 1852. During the gold rush years of the 1850s—1860s Hoffnung (in partnership with Henry Nathan) prospered by supplying miners and settlers of the colony with provisions and stores. In 1870 the company commissioned the construction of new purposely built premises at 163/171 Pitt Street. These premises were designed by Thomas Rowe. Also during the 1870s the company opened new branches in Brisbane, New Zealand, Fiji and London. In 1899 the company was incorporated as a private limited liability company and adopted the title of S. Hoffnung & Co. Limited. Later, in 1902 the firm became a public company.

In April 1937 the company's premises at 163—171 Pitt Street were resumed by the Commonwealth Government for the proposed extensions to the Sydney GPO. Prior to this in early 1937 the company had undertaken the purchase of several allotments of land on Kent and Clarence Street. The move to the new premises at Clarence Street was completed in January 1939. While the company continued to trade from their 367-371 Kent Street property the premises at Clarence Street became their headquarters.

Sigmond Hoffnung and presumably his descendants were prominent in Jewish activities in the city of Sydney. Sigmond was associated with the York Street Synagogue and a benefactor of the building committee of the Great Synagogue in Elizabeth Street. He also served on committees to raise money for the Sydney Jewish Sabbath School; the Sydney Hebrew Certified Denominational Scholl, and the Jewish Philanthropic and Orphan Society.

The Clarence Street property was the fifth warehouse occupied by the firm. The location of the earlier premises were generally in the vicinity of the GPO: at 339 George Street (from 1855), 2 Wynyard Street (from 1861), 117 Pitt Street (from 1870) and 163—171 Pitt Street (from 1883). The size and architectural quality of these buildings suggest that the firm during the period 1850s to c. 1950s was an important member of Sydney's commercial trading houses.

The Australian Red Cross was established in 1914 (as a consequence of the outbreak of hostilities at this time) as a branch of the British organisation. The institution is associated with a wide range of medical and social welfare activities. Prior to the move to Hoffnung building, the New South Wales branch of the society was located in premises at No. 1 York Street.

The property was purchased by the Australian Red Cross in July 1970 and used as offices and a blood donor centre until 2010. It was sold in 2011 and redeveloped in 2015 as commercial offices by Union Investment. The building is now known as 155 Clarence Street. The renovation work between 2013 and 2015 included the addition of three levels of commercial office space, conservation and repair of the facades, reconstruction of missing or altered elements and refurbishment of all floors that reinstated the original architectural qualities of the internal office spaces. The architects of the ground floor renovations in 2023 were GroupGSA.

=== Architect ===
The design of the building is credited to Samuel Lipson in conjunction with the large Sydney architectural practice of Robertson, Marks and McCredie. However the role of Robertson, Marks and McCredie in this relationship is not entirely clear as Lipson alone appears to have been responsible for the drawings prepared in the development stages of the project.

Samuel Lionel Lipson was born in Leeds, England of Lithuanian descent. His architectural training commenced in 1916 at the School of Architecture within the Glasgow School of Arts. Lipson passed the Royal Institute of British Architects entrance examination in 1924, and in the following year migrated to Australia. Following his arrivals in Sydney, Lipson was employed for a while in the Commonwealth Department of Works & Railways. During his tenure here he worked on a number of Commonwealth Bank buildings erected around the county at this time. Connected with this work was the remodelling of the bank's head office at the corner of Pitt Street and Martin Place. Lipson was retrenched from government employment in the early 1930s and went into private practice. One of the early significant commissions was the remodelling of The Daily Telegraph Building in 1933 for the Bank of New South Wales (extant and now known as the Trust Building).

From the mid—1930s Lipson was in practice with Peter Kaad. The work of this firm was heavily influenced by the Dutch School of Architecture, in particular by the work of Willem Dudok. Extant important work by this office up to the outbreak of World War II includes the Hoffnung Building (1937—1938) and the Temple Emmanuel, Woollahra.

== Description ==
The building is constructed of reinforced concrete throughout designed on the flat slab principle which allowed with the mushroom-head columns. The dimension of the columns varied from between 46 to 84 centimetres (18 to 33 in) in diameter. The head of the columns are approximately 1.68 metres (5 ft 6 in) in diameter.

Clarence Street elevation

Eight level face brick with recessed ninth floor level behind awning with five column bays at ground floor and expressed columns up to second floor level with central Art Deco pierced breakfront and cement rendered fin-like termination motifs in Moderne style. Evidence of original awning removed. Original decorative copper clock converted to Red Cross symbol. Steel frame windows with curved terminations at north and south ends and breakfronts at top level. Recessed façade at ground level c. 1971, possibly including paving and column cladding. Luxaflex metal ceiling linings to undercroft. At first floor level decorative marble facings in Moderne and Art Deco design. Recessed upper levels including plant rooms and water tanks with cement rendered surfaces and galvanised steel railings.

Kent Street elevations

Nine level face brick and render with roof top extension of one level. Horizontal Moderne style with steel frame windows. Vertical emphasis breakfront at north end indicating stairwell. Steel awning at street level over vehicle entrances.

South elevation

Cement rendered above adjacent building.

North elevation

Bounded by taller building set back approximately 5m, cement rendered walls.

As at 3 January 2001, the archaeological potential of the place is low. The building is not included in the Archaeological Zoning Plan for Central Sydney 1992 In general, the building is reasonably intact, in particular the Clarence and Kent Street facades.

=== Modifications and dates ===
- October 1938 – Installation of partitions on the first floor
- November 1939 – Alterations to the ground floor lock up shop at 157 Clarence Street
- November 1947 – Installation of ventilation ducts on the ground floor
- May 1955 – Making of two holes (purpose not known but probably chutes) on the lower ground floor for S. Hoffnung & Co.
- March 1964 – Unspecified alteration valued at £300
- 1972 – Alterations to the premises for uses as offices and as a blood transfusion service for the Australian Red Cross Society. These alterations were undertaken by the Dept. of Public works and Lipson, Kaad & Fotheringham from mid 1972. Visual inspection of the extant building indicates these alterations partitioned the interior spaces, removed the original shop fronts and showcases on the Clarence Street facade, inserted additional lifts, and converted the cart dock area to car parking. amenities such as lavatories were also probably upgraded at this time.
- March 1974 – Erection of an illuminated sign for the Red Cross Society by Claude Neon. This work valued at $20,000 and probably relates partly to the conversion of the Clarence Street clock.
- c. 1976 – Installation of an Energy Australia electricity substation (no. 3588) probably in relation to the use of the building as a blood transfusion centre.
- December 1987 – Installation of partitioning on the third floor. work valued at $20,00
- January 1988 – Construction of a storeroom on a ? new eighth floor
- June 1993 – Partitioning and bricking up openings on the third floor
- September 1993 – Enlarging of existing diesel generator plant.
- 2013—2015 restoration and three additional floors added for a total lettable floor area of 12462m^{2}
- 2024 ground level foyer upgraded

== Heritage listing ==
As at 3 January 2001, the building was constructed in 1938—1939 for and exclusively occupied until c. 1971 by the long established Sydney wholesalers S. Hoffnung & Co. Ltd. The building was designed by Samuel Lipson (in conjunction with Robertson Marks and McCredie), now noted as one of the avant-garde designers of the 1930s and part of the movement to introduce European derived Modernism into Australia. The building was designed principally as a warehouse structure and as such probably represents the last such large scale structure to be erected in the traditional warehousing quarter of the Sydney CBD — Clarence, York and Kent Streets. Since c. 1974 the building has been exclusively occupied by one of Australia's best known medical and welfare institutions, the Red Cross Society. The building is a very good and rare example of a Moderne style CBD warehouse building possessing characteristic features embodied in the Kent and Clarence Street facades. Internally the aesthetic of clean industrial quality finishes is exhibited in the system of columns and mushroom head capitals. The building facades make a substantial contribution to the streetscape of both Kent and Clarence Streets by the use of texture brick relieved by the horizontal bands of windows, which in the instance of the principal front of Clarence Street is contrasted by the strong vertical element of the triangular window and Art Deco motif termination. The building has served as the Red Cross Blood Transfusion Centre for nearly the past twenty five years. This association is probably recognised by a majority of the community of Sydney of all ages. The association of the building with the S.Hoffnung & Co. Ltd ownership is also likely to be recognised by some older members of Sydney. The building has also been recognised as possessing heritage significance by the City Council and various professional and interest groups.

Red Cross House was listed on the New South Wales State Heritage Register on 25 May 2001 having satisfied the following criteria.

The place is important in demonstrating the course, or pattern, of cultural or natural history in New South Wales.

While much of the warehousing stock in the York, Clarence, Kent Street area was constructed on the building booms of the 1880s and 1900s, the Hoffnung warehouse, constructed in 1938-9 is a relatively late building, and as such is probably the last major warehouse to be constructed prior to the outbreak of World War Two. By the time of next building boom of the 1950s the need for such a building in the CBD had vanished. The building is associated with the work of Samuel Lipson, being an excellent example of a large scale commission of this architect of the late 1930s.

The place is important in demonstrating aesthetic characteristics and/or a high degree of creative or technical achievement in New South Wales.

The building is a very good (albeit altered) example of a city CBD warehouse building in the Moderne style. The building retains many features which are indicative of the original Moderne style design, these being:

- steel frame windows on the street facades.
- textured brickwork on both principal facades.
- remnants of granite relief panel above entrance.
- public clock (now converted to Red Cross sign)
- the roof top rendered decorative roof foils.
- the central triangular window with Art Deco motif
- retention of most of the planning design for the Clarence and Kent Street facades.
- vertical breakfront on the Kent Street façade.

The place has a strong or special association with a particular community or cultural group in New South Wales for social, cultural or spiritual reasons.

The building has served as the Red Cross Blood Transfusion Centre for nearly the past twenty five years. This association is probably recognised by a majority of the community of Sydney of all ages.

The place possesses uncommon, rare or endangered aspects of the cultural or natural history of New South Wales.

Red Cross House is rare as an extant Art Deco warehouse building in the City of Sydney. It exhibits fine Art Deco Moderne detailing on its Clarence Street facade.
