= Sebel Townhouse Hotel =

Hotels in Sydney

General information
- Location: 19 Elizabeth Bay Road, Elizabeth Bay, Sydney, New South Wales, Australia
- Coordinates: 33°52′22″S 151°13′38″E
- Completed: 1963

Sebel Townhouse Hotel is a former hotel in Elizabeth Bay, Sydney, New South Wales, Australia. The hotel was noted for its popularity with entertainers.

== History ==
The hotel opened in 1963. By the mid-1960s, it had gained "an international reputation for its intimacy and attention", and became popular with entertainers. The hotel "became the unofficial home of the Australian music industry" during the 1970s and 1980s, and a location where Australian artists were able to meet with notable musicians staying at the hotel. The hotel declined in the 1990s, when new hotels—nearer the harbour—opened in the city, and the Kings Cross neighbourhood near the Sebel Townhouse "become more sleazy". The hotel closed in 2000, and was converted to private apartments.

== Notable guests and events ==
Notable guests include Lauren Bacall, David Bowie, the Clash, the Harlem Globetrotters, Malcolm McLaren, the Moody Blues, and Rod Stewart. Dire Straits stayed at the Sebel Townhouse, the band's guitarist John Illsley writing the hotel was "colorful and edgy", and "the discretion of the staff is one of the reasons why it is so loved by the more untamed celebrities". The rock band Guns N' Roses stayed here when they played Eastern Creek in 1994. Neil Finn was a regular visitor.

Simon Le Bon of Duran Duran stayed in the penthouse for a filming of a TV Special called 'Le Bon Voyage', filmed in Sydney, Australia January 30, 1986.

The hotel was featured in ABBA: The Movie (1977).

It was also the official hotel sponsor for all the cast and crew members who work on television variety shows including Countdown (1975-1987) and Hey Hey It's Saturday (1984-1987), when they did live shows in Sydney.

In 1984, the hotel hosted the wedding reception of Elton John and Renate Blauel.
