= Clarence Street, Sydney =

Street in Sydney, Australia

Clarence Street, Sydney New South Wales
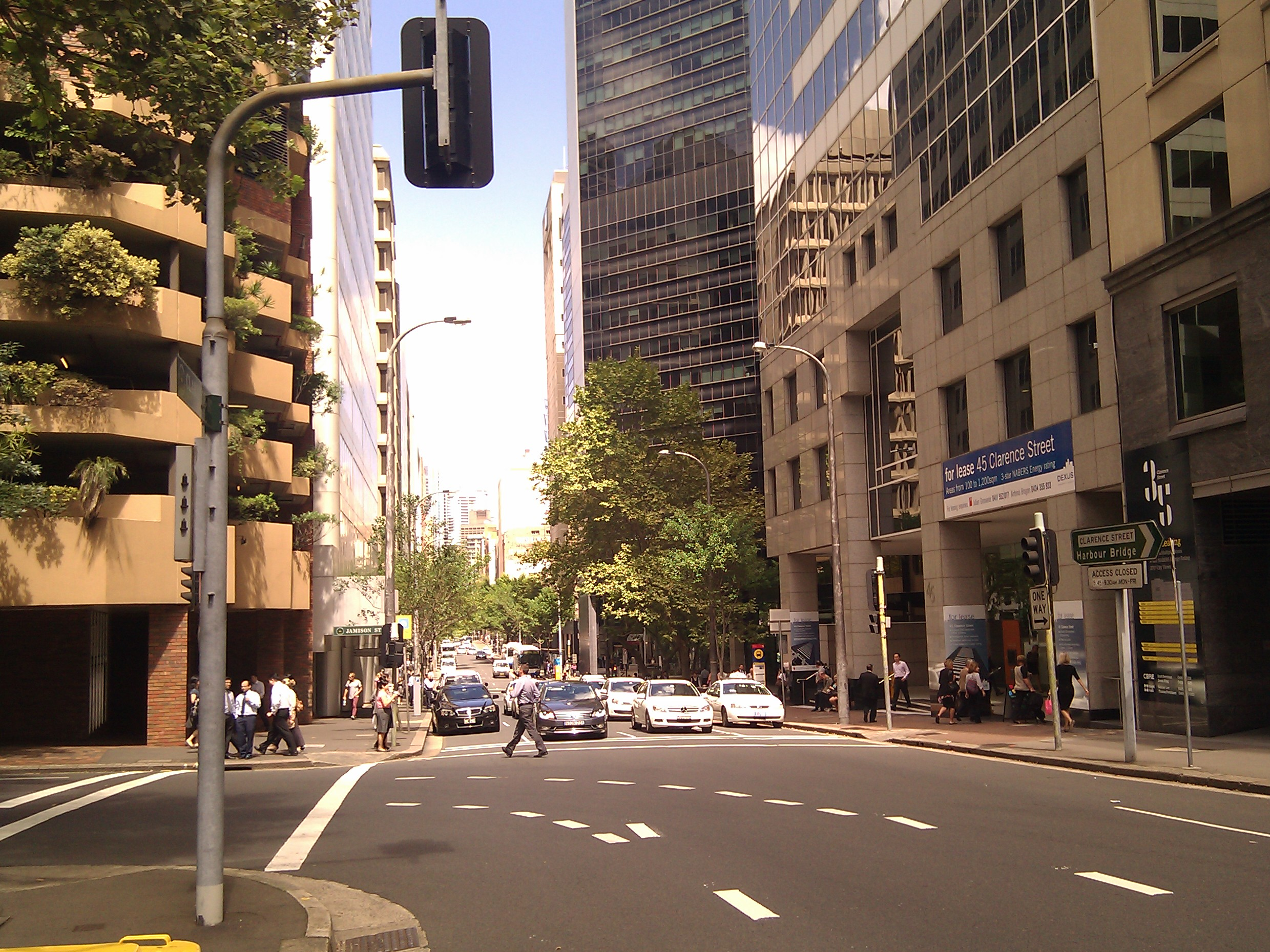
- Clarence Street in March 2012

General information
- Type: Street
- Length: 1.0 km (0.6 mi)

Major junctions
- Southern end: Druitt Street
- Market Street; King Street; Barrack Street; Erskine Street; Margaret Street
- Northern end: Jamison Street

Clarence Street is a street in the Sydney central business district, Australia.

Originally named Middle Soldiers Row, it was renamed by Governor Macquarie in 1810 after the Duke of Clarence. The section between Bathurst Street and Sydney Town Hall was named St Andrews Place in 1914, this section has since disappeared.

Clarence Street runs south–north from Druitt Street to Jamison Street feeding traffic onto the Harbour Bridge.

A bus lane opened between Barrack Street and the Harbour Bridge in November 1989.

Notable buildings include the Grace Building, Clarence Street Police Station, Red Cross House, Barrack Place and St Philip's Church.
