= APA Building, Sydney =

Historic building in Sydney, Australia

APA Building
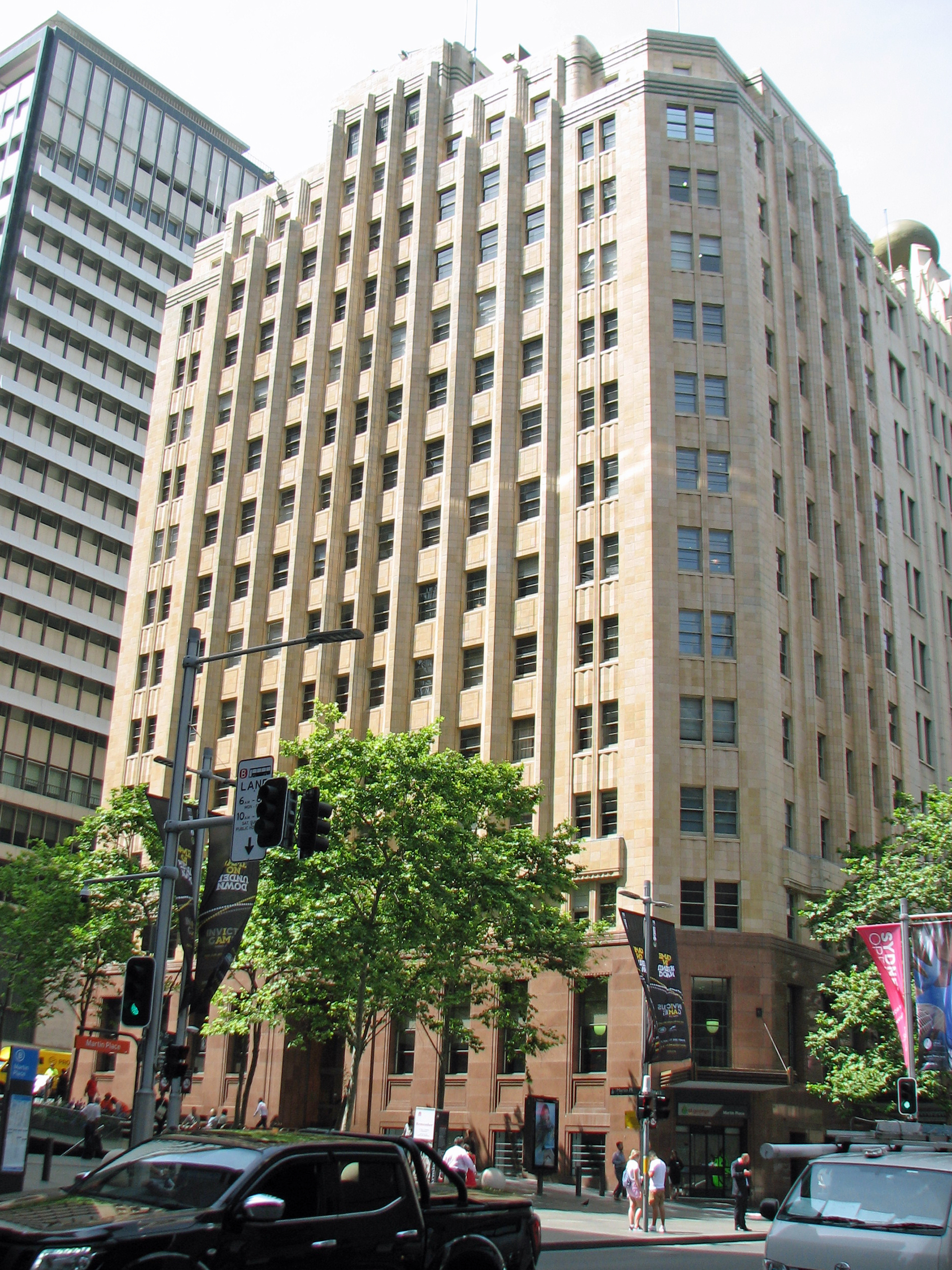

- Location within Sydney Location within Australia
- 33.8680°S 151.2109°E
- Location: 53–63 Martin Place, Sydney central business district, New South Wales, Australia

History
- Built: 1936

Site notes
- Architect: David King

New South Wales Heritage Register
- Official name: APA Building
- Type: State heritage (built)
- Designated: 2 April 1999
- Reference no.: 682
- Type: Commercial Office/Building
- Category: Commercial
- Builders: Kell & Rigby

The APA Building is a heritage-listed office building located at 53–63 Martin Place in the Sydney central business district, New South Wales, Australia. It was designed by David King and built in 1936 by Kell & Rigby. From 2004 to October 2021, the building most notably housed a Lindt chocolate café on the eastern side of the ground floor. The café came to international attention during the 2014 Sydney hostage crisis, thus being commonly referred to as the Lindt café siege. The building was added to the New South Wales State Heritage Register on 2 April 1999.

== History ==
The development of a new headquarters building for the Australian Provincial Assurance Association in Martin Place was intrinsically connected to the development of Martin Place itself. When on 8 April 1936, the extension of Martin Place to Macquarie Street was opened, a series of development sites along each side of the new thoroughfare were made available by the City of Sydney. The first two sites sold were those between Elizabeth and Phillip Streets. The northern block was sold to the Rural Bank of New South Wales and the southern block was purchased by the Australian Provincial Assurance Company on 23 May 1935 for £83,000.

David King, a young architect, was appointed to prepare a design for the project and to oversee the construction. The brief was to erect premises to the full building height, and to design in conformity with that of the surrounding buildings. The contract was let to builders Kell & Rigby following the calling of tenders in February 1936 and construction began in early June 1936, subsequent to five months of preliminary work and excavation. The structural systems selected for the project was that in common use at that time, a structural steel frame with reinforced concrete floor slabs and concrete encasement to the steel work. This composite systems allowed for extremely rapid construction of the superstructure and work on the steel frame commenced on 3 June 1936 and was completed on 17 September, a period of fifteen weeks.

The building was opened in May 1937 and was considered successful by the press of the period. The first tenant was the Australian Provincial Assurance Association who occupied the ground floor, three quarters of the first floor and all of the basement, but other floors were taken by the legal firm of Allen, Allen and Hemsley, by a government department and several smaller organisations, including the architectural practice of David King himself. The lower ground floor was occupied for many years by a quality restaurant (Cahill's) with direct access from Elizabeth Street via steps.

With the outbreak of World War II in 1939, many of the tenants, including the APA, relocated to other premises and the Department of Manpower effectively took over the building. Exceptions to this move were the practices of both Allen, Allen and Hemsley, and David King. It was during this period that the western half of the twelfth floor was completed. This level had previously been completed at the eastern end only, due to the 150 foot high limit affecting the building differentially in regard to the change of level between Elizabeth and Phillip Streets. The eastern end had been used as a caretaker's flat, with the western half utilised as a roof garden.

After 1945 the APA resumed occupation of the building and were to remain in residence until 1989. In 1987 the APA which was undergoing restructuring finally sold the building to Noden Pty Ltd. In August 1989 the building was sold to the Charter Property Group.

=== Lindt Chocolate Cafe ===
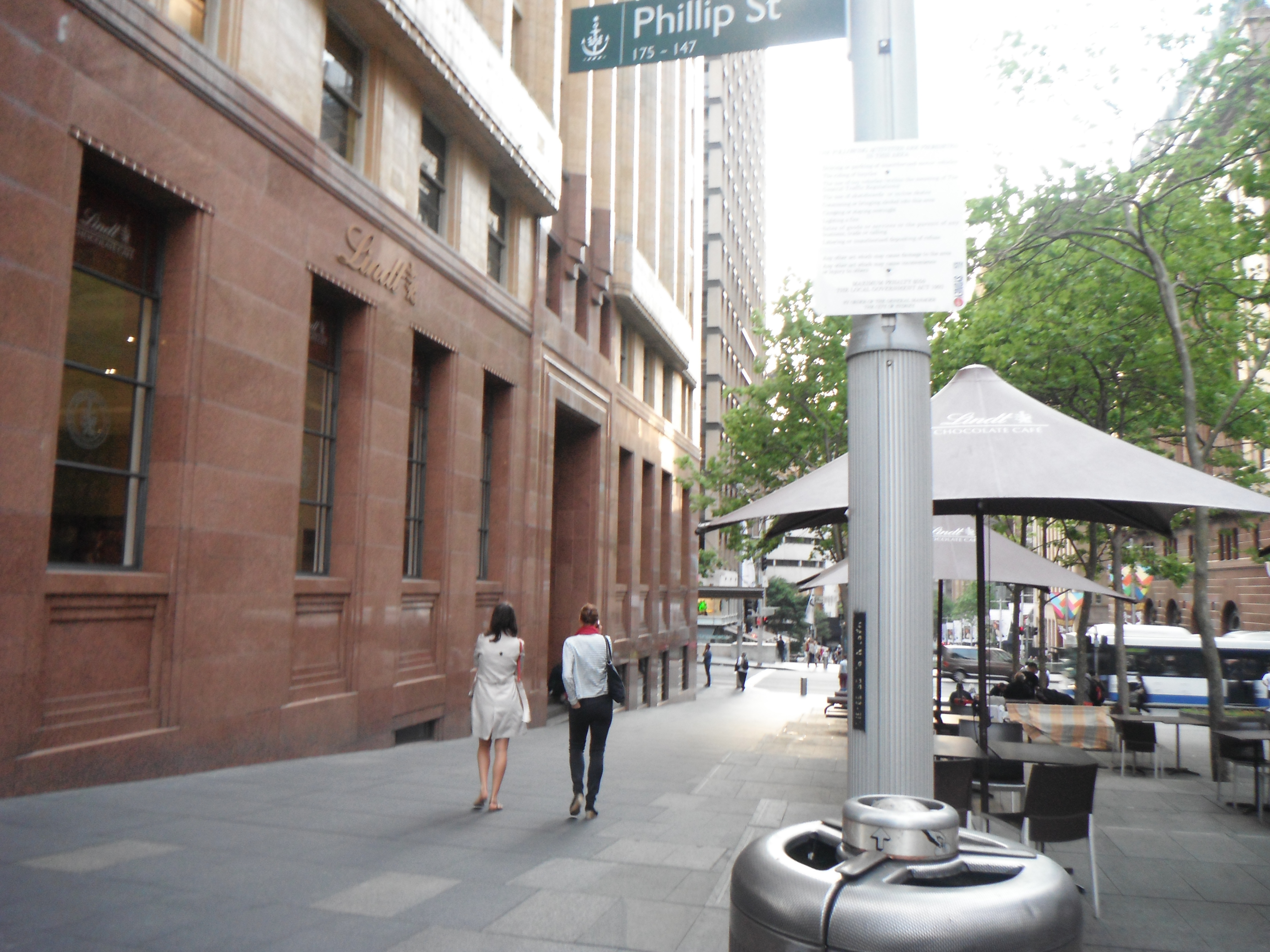
The Lindt Cafe ground floor facade of the APA building, pictured in 2013.

On 15–16 December 2014 the Lindt Chocolate Cafe on the ground floor of the Phillip Street frontage was the scene of the 2014 Sydney hostage crisis, when a lone gunman held staff and customers as hostages. The siege resulted in the death of two hostages, Tori Johnson and Katrina Dawson, and also the death of the gunman Man Haron Monis. After the siege, memorial flower bouquets filled nearby areas of Martin Place and many Sydneysiders came to Martin Place to mourn and reflect. Subsequent memorial services were held in the city at the nearby St Mary's Cathedral and St James' Church, and condolence books were set up in other Lindt cafes.

== Description ==
The APA Building occupies a site with a frontage of 37 metres (123 ft) to the south side of Martin Place. The block extends through from Elizabeth to Phillip Streets, has a frontage on these two streets of 17 metres (57 ft) and the main entry is located on the central axis of the Martin Place elevation. The building is limited by the 46 metres (150 ft) height limit in force at the time. It consists of twelve main floors, a lower ground floor and basement and a set back roof (12th) floor with an intermediate tower floor and lift motor room over.

The facade is polished red granite to the lower ground and ground levels with a combination of moulded and extruded glazed terra-cotta blocks to the exterior of the upper levels, including the roof (12th) floor and tower. The terra-cotta blocks are glazed in a light cream tone splattered with white and are supplemented at the roof parapet level with a triple row of deep green glazed terracotta bands. The terra cotta blocks were supplied by Wunderlich Limited and were chosen for their durability, permanence of colour and self cleaning character of material.

The external form of the building is dictated by the grid of 3 metres (9 ft 6 in). This is expressed externally as a truncated triangular pilaster, which runs in an unbroken line from an expressed balcony form at the level of the second floor to the facade setback at the level of the 12th (or roof) floor. These pilasters continue in an abbreviated form against the face of the 12th floor setback, the overall effect being one of a major vertical emphasis and one of symmetry.

The windows to the main office floors are of particular interest, being A. S. Spiers patent box frame types of Queensland Maple, which allow the sashes to be reversed for cleaning. Steel windows are used to the light well of the building, providing some measure of daylight to the toilets, main stair and rear office areas. The main entry is from Martin Place and is via a set of trachyte steps to a glass automatic entry doorset. The original timber entry doors of inlaid Queensland maple are in their original positions. The entry opening is surmounted by a cast bronze lintel bearing the inscription "No. 53" and has surface mounted letter to the granite over stating "APA Building".

The main entry foyer walls are of cream Botticcino marble with a skirting and architraves of dark green Verte Des Alpes marble. An imposing pair of green scagliola columns with original bronze-framed glass doors and top glazing flank each side of the foyer. The ceiling is of plaster with a heavily corbelled cornice and a domed recess for the central light. The original bronze lift doors, set into the south wall of the foyer, have been painted over. The main stair features treads, risers and landings of white marble, a handrail of Verte Des Alpes marble with solid balustrades of cream scagliola and walls of cream scagliola.

The most significant aspect of the structural system utilised for the APA Building was the speed at which the steel and concrete composite system allowed the work to proceed. The use of bolted structural steel not only reduced the noise level of the process, considered a major problem at the time when riveting was still common, but allowed for the steel frame to be erected in a period of fifteen weeks. Equally impressive was the curing of the concrete which was poured at the rate of two floors in five working days.

The main fabric of the building has survived largely unaltered since its construction in 1937.

=== Modifications and dates ===
- 1936 – constructed
- early 1940s – western half of the roof (12th floor) completed and caretakers flat removed
- mid 1940s – removal of detailed lift lobby
- 1961 – façade thoroughly cleaned and minor alterations
- mid 1960s – new doorway built into the existing window opening on the corner of Phillip Street and Martin Place. Lower ground floor windows to Elizabeth Street and Martin Place enlarged and reveals trimmed with black granite. New aluminium doors and glazing installed into the openings and original awning on the Elizabeth Street facade removed.
- late 1970s – major part of the building air-conditioned and lift lobbies refurbished
- 1989 – remaining APA signage removed with the exception of that over the main entry.

== Heritage listing ==
The construction of the APA building marked the beginning of the development of the eastern end of Martin Place and Phillip Street as a major commercial and professional precinct. It was designed and constructed for the former Australian Provincial Assurance Association Ltd on a block purchased to construct a new headquarters for the association.

The APA Building exhibits a high level of architectural quality in terms of its proportions, facade treatment and vocabulary of detail. The building was designed to formalise and define the new major civic thoroughfare of Martin Place. The structural system utilised in the building facilitated a very short construction time and reduced noise problems.

APA Building was listed on the New South Wales State Heritage Register on 2 April 1999 having satisfied the following criteria.

The place is important in demonstrating the course, or pattern, of cultural or natural history in New South Wales.

The construction of the APA building marked the beginning of the development of the eastern end of Martin Place and Phillip Street as a major commercial and professional precinct. It was designed and constructed for the former Australian Provincial Assurance Association Ltd on a block purchased to construct a new headquarters for the association. The Association subsequently remained in the building for over fifty years. The building represents a brief period of economic expansion between the end of the depression and the Second World War. The architect David W. King occupied a suite in the building for over thirty years and was largely responsible for ongoing maintenance and alterations to the building during this time.

The place is important in demonstrating aesthetic characteristics and/or a high degree of creative or technical achievement in New South Wales.

The APA Building exhibits a high level of architectural quality in terms of its proportions, facade treatment and vocabulary of detail. The building was designed to formalise and define the new major civic thoroughfare of Martin Place. The building presents a uniform and harmonious composition around the three sides of its block.

The place has potential to yield information that will contribute to an understanding of the cultural or natural history of New South Wales.

The structural system utilised in the building facilitated a very short construction time and reduced noise problems. The plan of the building and use of windows and light well enabled a high level of efficiency in terms of natural lighting and ventilation.

The place possesses uncommon, rare or endangered aspects of the cultural or natural history of New South Wales.

The APA Building is the last remaining example in Martin Place of what was a consistent group of structures exhibiting a conformity of scale, facade treatment and vocabulary of detail.
