= 354 George Street, Sydney =

Heritage-listed building in Sydney, Australia

354 George Street
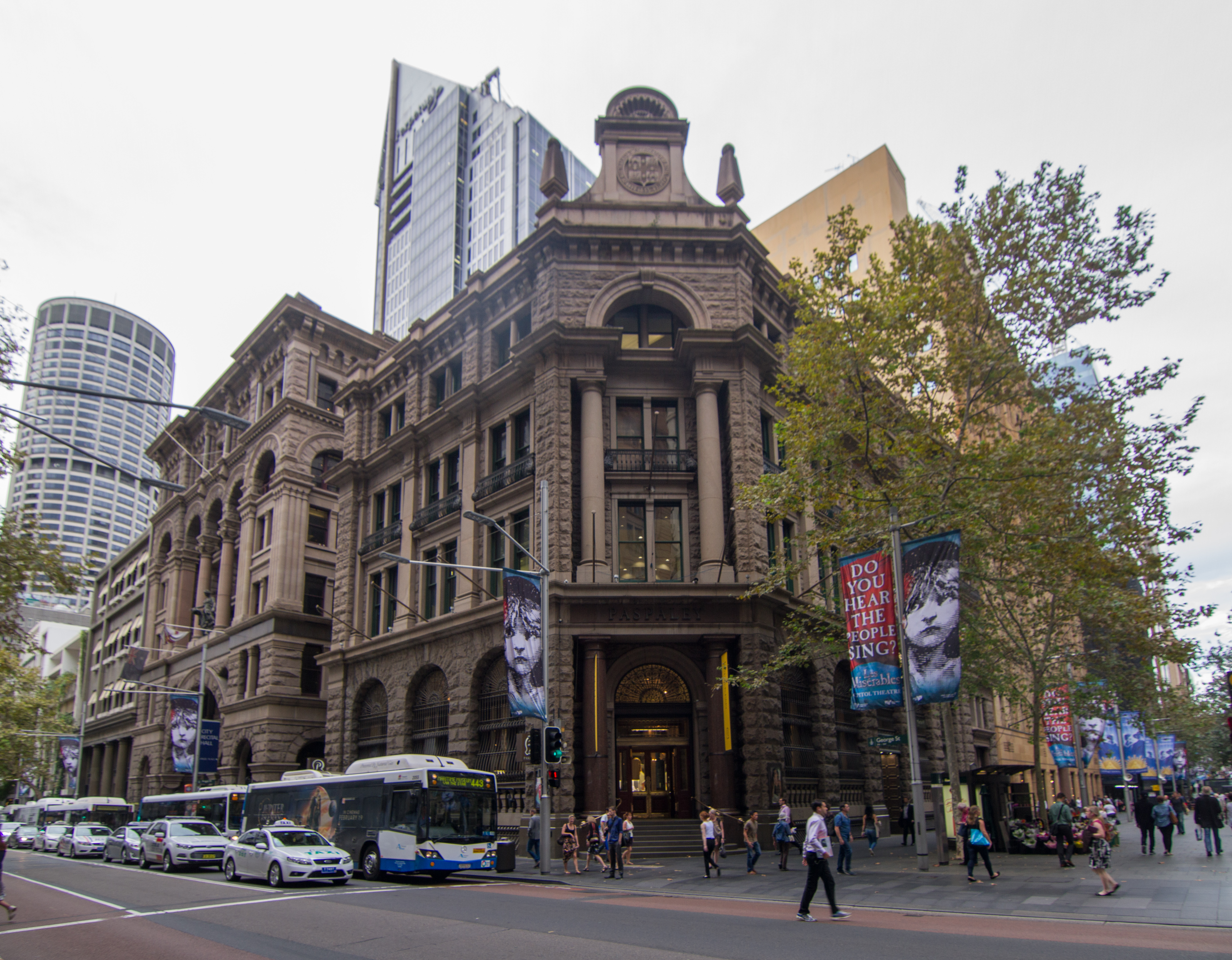
- 354 George Street, on the corner of Martin Place, pictured in 2015

- Location within Sydney Location within Australia
- 33.8672°S 151.2074°E
- Location: 354 George Street, Sydney central business district, City of Sydney, New South Wales, Australia

History
- Built: 1902–1904
- Built for: Bank of Australasia

Site notes
- Architects: Edward Raht (1904); A. K. Henderson (1937); Joseland & Gilling (1951–1958); Kevin Winterbottom and Assoc. (1980)
- Architectural style: Federation Romanesque
- Owner: Paspaley Pearls Properties P/L

New South Wales Heritage Register
- Official name: ANZ Bank (former); ANZ Bank; United Permanent Building; 2 Martin Place;; Paspaley Pearls; 354–360 George Street; Bank of Australasia
- Type: State heritage (built)
- Designated: 2 April 1999
- Reference no.: 85
- Type: Bank
- Category: Commercial
- Builders: Loveridge & Hudson (1904); Kell & Rigby (1937)

354 George Street, Sydney is a heritage-listed retail and office building and former bank building located at 354 George Street, in the Sydney central business district, in the City of Sydney local government area of New South Wales, Australia. It was designed in various stages by Edward Raht, A. K. Henderson, Joseland & Gilling and Kevin Winterbottom and Assoc. and built in various stages from 1902 to 1937 by Loveridge & Hudson and Kell & Rigby. It is also known as ANZ Bank (former); ANZ Bank; United Permanent Building; 2 Martin Place; Paspaley Pearls; 354-360 George Street; and Bank of Australasia. The property is owned by Paspaley Pearls Properties P/L. It was added to the New South Wales State Heritage Register on 2 April 1999.

== History ==
The subject land, on the east side of George Street opposite the original Barracks Square had been built upon from the early days of the colony. Originally the Bank of Australasia's site was on two distinct titles. The two titles were converted to a single title at the beginning of 1904. The new building for the Bank of Australasia was designed by Edward E Raht, an architect from New York who arrived in Australia in July 1891. The Equitable Life Assurance Society had sent out from America their distinguished New York architect, Raht (born in Austria). Raht was noted for his commissions to design prestige buildings for insurance companies and banks.

Raht designed both the adjacent Equitable Life Assurance Building, 348-352 George Street, and the Bank of Australasia building around a steel frame, faced with heavy, load-bearing trachyte in the Federation Romanesque style. The trachyte came from the Bowral quarries on Mount Gibraltar owned by the contractors Loveridge and Hudson. These buildings are exceptional for their use of trachyte for the entire exterior and not merely for lower stories, arches and columns. They are the first buildings to be constructed with external walls entirely of trachyte, which was more commonly used as a decorative stone in combination with sandstone and granite. Erected in 1904, the ANZ Bank was an early example in Australia of the influence of the American Romanesque style developed by Raht's countryman, Henry Hobson Richardson, from the 1870s onward. After studying in Paris, Richardson had evolved his own simplified distillation of the Romanesque style and attracted numerous American disciples. Raht also designed offices for the Equitable Life Assurance Society of the United States of America in Melbourne in 1892, using the same steel frame and thick stone walls (in this case granite).

Apart from bringing contemporary American architectural trends to Australia, Raht was influential in that he initiated a trend that made great use of the building stone trachyte in commercial and public buildings over the next forty years.

The building was officially opened on 11 February 1904 and occupied by the Bank during the following March. Included amongst the distinctive features of the banking chamber were light fixtures attached to the lower portions of the columns in the centre of the pace, patterned interlocking rubber flooring and a narrow gallery at the eastern end of the building. A circular window pierced the upper part of the wall at this end of the chamber. Counters were placed along the southern side of the chamber, and marble partitioned offices ran along its northern side. The tall windows providing light from the street frontages were protected externally by finely wrought metal grilles. What appear to be the first alterations to the building were documented in 1936, to the design of the architectural firm A. K. Henderson of Melbourne. By 1940 the building was known as Australasia Chambers and contained bank offices and professional rooms. In 1947 minor alterations were carried out to the ground floor banking chamber and a couple of years later a partition was in the roof level lift lobby. In 1961 it was one of two chief Sydney Offices and the New South Wales Divisional Office of the Australian and New Zealand Bank.

Architects Joseland and Gilling were responsible for several of the later modifications to the building. The ownership of 2 Martin Place was transferred to Tenzon Pty. Ltd. On 26 August 1980 then several days later to the United Permanent Building Society, on 8 September 1980, who made application to the City of Sydney Council to have minor works carried out. The building was officially re-opened on 24 March 1982. In October 1984 ownership passed to the Government Insurance Office, which then leased the mezzanine, ground floor and basement levels to the United Permanent Building Society for a period of four years.

== Description ==
2 Martin Place, the former Bank of Australasia, still conforms to the basic configuration designed by Edward Raht, and contains a high ground floor with shallow mezzanine along the eastern side, three upper floors and two basement levels. Major elements of vertical circulation, including a steel stair and two early lifts, are located on the eastern side of the building. The facade is of a broad Renaissance influence with some forms drawn from early Renaissance models, while others appear to be of Baroque derivation. The interior is lavishly decorated with extensive use of bronze, marble, cedar, fine wrought iron and gold leaf dominating the main banking chamber.

The three street facades are constructed of "Bowral Trachyte" from Mount Gibraltar microsyenite quarry. The trachyte supply, masonry and building contractor was Loveridge and Hudson who also built Raht's Societe Generale (former Equitable Life Assurance Society of America) at 348-352 George Street. The refined stone detailing a heavily rusticated rock-faced facade contrasted with a polished base, with both honed and tooled details and smooth trachyte columns, window mullions, cornice and parapet. Loveridge and Hudson were important masonry contractors with skilled banker masons as well as trachyte quarries. The Bank's motif is carved on a semicircular pediment above the splayed corner.

The eastern party wall is of brick. The two large basement levels extend five metres (sixteen feet) under Martin Place and are lit by deep wells on all three facades, with pavement lights. The structure is a composite of load-bearing external walls with wrought-iron columns and rolled steel girders, clad in terra-cotta. Load bearing brickwork supports partition walls. Ceilings are rendered flush based on half inch plaster blocks, attached to the soffit of the terra-cotta blocks. Flat roof structure similar to floor structure above.

The building is in the Federation Romanesque style, an early example of the influence of American Romanesque. American architects Edward Raht's work in Sydney and Melbourne made a significant point in the development of the style. At this time the Federation Free Classical style was most commonly applied to commercial and institutional buildings and was current in the years around the turn of the century and up to the time of World War I. Banks generally conformed to the basic language of Classical Architecture, designers distorted, exaggerated and simplified detailing and sometimes invented new forms. Elements of the Victorian Mannerist style appeared in the form of dramatic shifts in scale and a sense of cleverness and an expression of the unusual. Practitioners of Federation Romanesque in Sydney were George McRae, William Kemp, Varney Parkes and Edward Raht.

The building forms an important part of the streetscape in this part of the city, with important visual links to a number of other significant nineteenth and twentieth century buildings in the locality. Almost all, with the exception of the Art Deco style Challis House, are designed within a well detailed and rich vocabulary of classically derived detailing, but all are faced in a variety of building stones, including sandstone, trachyte and granite. The entry at the corner of George Street and Martin Place and the eastern entry addressing Martin Place exemplifies the neo-Romanesque character of the exterior. Substantial wrought metal grilles protect the windows to the ground floor and upper basement levels. The combination of these elements with the rusticated stonework that surrounds the window openings creates a rich physical and visual texture at street level. The window joinery appears to be original. Later items that have been placed on the facades include a clock on the western side and a plaque on the eastern side of the Martin Place facade.

=== Condition ===
As at 16 October 2008, The condition of the fabric is excellent. The archaeological potential of the site is unknown.

=== Modifications and dates ===
1936, 1947, 1951–1959, 1966, 1968, 1970, 1974.

== Heritage listing ==
As at 16 October 2008, The building is historically significant because of its associations with the Bank of Australasia and the formation and consolidation of Martin Place in the wake of the construction of the General Post Office. The building has aesthetic significance because it is fine example of a Federation Romanesque bank located amongst a group of important nineteenth and twentieth century commercial and public buildings. It also has significance because of its associations with the notable American architect Edward E. Raht, who is credited with introducing neo-Romanesque architecture to Australia which led to the Federation Warehouse style. The building makes a very important visual contribution to the immediate locality, and contains one of the finest surviving banking chambers in Sydney, one of a group of buildings in the locality that also contain significant banking chambers. Certain parts of the building's fabric, including the pair of birdcage lift cars, steel stair, marble lined lavatories within the upper basement, the marble lined ceiling above the ground floor lobby; the vaulted ceilings lined with glazed bricks and security vault spaces located in the lower basement have technical/research significance.

ANZ Bank was listed on the New South Wales State Heritage Register on 2 April 1999 having satisfied the following criteria.

The place is important in demonstrating the course, or pattern, of cultural or natural history in New South Wales.

2 Martin Place has important associations with the Bank of Australasia, an influential and durable financial institution that played a prominent part in the economic history of Australia during the nineteenth and twentieth centuries, and which continues to do so today in the guise of the ANZ Banking Group.

The place has a strong or special association with a person, or group of persons, of importance of cultural or natural history of New South Wales's history.

2 Martin Place is an important work by the notable architect Edward Raht, who as chief architect for the Equitable Life Assurance Society of the USA designing the Equitable Life Buildings in Sydney and Melbourne, credited with introducing the neo-Romanesque architecture which led to the Federation Warehouse style. It is a rare example of an early twentieth-century building in NSW designed by an American architect who was responsible for the introduction of refined stone detailing in trachyte subsequently popular in dimension stone treatment in the early twentieth century.

The place is important in demonstrating aesthetic characteristics and/or a high degree of creative or technical achievement in New South Wales.

2 Martin Place has technical significance due to intact fabric that demonstrates past building techniques and technology. The building contains rare examples of early services including: the pair of birdcage lift cars located in a shaft surrounded by a steel stair; marble lined lavatories within the upper basement; the marble lined ceiling above the ground floor lobby; the vaulted ceilings lined with glazed bricks (possibly part of 1937 works) and security vaulted spaces including heavy steel bars, locks and doors located in the lower basement.

The place has a strong or special association with a particular community or cultural group in New South Wales for social, cultural or spiritual reasons.

The building does not demonstrate a strong or special association with a particular community or cultural group in NSW of social, cultural or spiritual reasons.

The place has potential to yield information that will contribute to an understanding of the cultural or natural history of New South Wales.

It is a rare and relatively intact example of a Federation Romanesque style bank building in Sydney. It features exceptionally fine stone detailing and rare wrought iron metal grilles protecting windows at ground level.

The place possesses uncommon, rare or endangered aspects of the cultural or natural history of New South Wales.

Martin Place contains a group of banks with large and richly detailed purpose-designed banking chambers. 2 Martin Place is a scarce example in Sydney of a turn of the century bank, containing one of the finest banking chambers surviving in the City. It is rare at State level.

The place is important in demonstrating the principal characteristics of a class of cultural or natural places/environments in New South Wales.

The building is an important contribution to Martin Place and George Street, having strong visual relationship with the General Post Office, former Equitable Building and other major nineteenth and twentieth century office buildings in this locality.

== See also ==
- Australian non-residential architectural styles
- Martin Place
