= Kuri Bay =

Bay in Western Australia

Kuri Bay is a remote coastal bay in the far north of Western Australia in the Kimberley region, about 370 km (230 mi) north of Broome. It is a designated point on the Western Australian Forecast Areas, utilised by the Bureau of Meteorology as a boundary for the North Kimberley Coast area from the West Kimberley Coast.

The closest main town is Derby, 223 km (139 mi) southwest of the bay. The bay opens directly into the Indian Ocean, and Augustus Island is located just off-shore from the bay. The bay is part of the Prince Regent National Park and the Kunmunya Aboriginal Reserve.

== History ==
It is the home to Australia's first cultured pearl farm and is named after the company's first principal, Tokuichi Kuribayashi (1896–1982). The Japanese-American-Australian company commenced operations in 1956 following the Western Australian Government repealing the Pearling Act that prohibited the production, sale and possession of cultured pearls. A monument to the founders of the Kuri Bay pearling industry stood in Broome and featured Tokuichi Kuribayashi, Keith Dureau and Hiroshi Iwaki. Kuribayashi was originally from Nippon Pearl Company, Tokyo, while Iwaki and Dureau were from Pearl Proprietary Ltd, which had been set up through finance from Otto Gerdau Company, Male and Co, and Brown and Dureau Ltd.

By 1973 the Kuri Bay operation was producing 60% of the world's large white South Sea pearls. Paspaley, the biggest supplier of South Sea pearls in the world, has one of their largest and most well-known pearl farms located at Kuri Bay.

== Climate ==
Kuri Bay experiences a tropical savanna climate (Köppen climate classification Aw).

Climate data for Kuri Bay
Month	Jan	Feb	Mar	Apr	May	Jun	Jul	Aug	Sep	Oct	Nov	Dec	Year
Mean daily maximum °C (°F)	32.8 (91.0)	32.5 (90.5)	33.2 (91.8)	34.3 (93.7)	33.0 (91.4)	31.3 (88.3)	31.1 (88.0)	31.9 (89.4)	33.1 (91.6)	33.8 (92.8)	34.3 (93.7)	34.0 (93.2)	32.9 (91.2)
Mean daily minimum °C (°F)	25.5 (77.9)	25.1 (77.2)	24.9 (76.8)	24.3 (75.7)	21.9 (71.4)	19.6 (67.3)	18.5 (65.3)	19.7 (67.5)	22.2 (72.0)	24.5 (76.1)	26.1 (79.0)	26.2 (79.2)	23.2 (73.8)
Average precipitation mm (inches)	407.4 (16.04)	356.3 (14.03)	306.0 (12.05)	64.8 (2.55)	47.1 (1.85)	8.8 (0.35)	4.8 (0.19)	1.1 (0.04)	1.7 (0.07)	6.9 (0.27)	25.9 (1.02)	158.9 (6.26)	1,389.7 (54.71)
Average rainy days	15.2	15.3	13.4	4.4	2.0	.7	.3	.2	.2	.8	2.5	8.8	63.8
Source: Australian Bureau of Meteorology

== See also ==
- Coastal regions of Western Australia
