= George Street, Sydney =

Street in Sydney, Australia

George Street, Sydney New South Wales
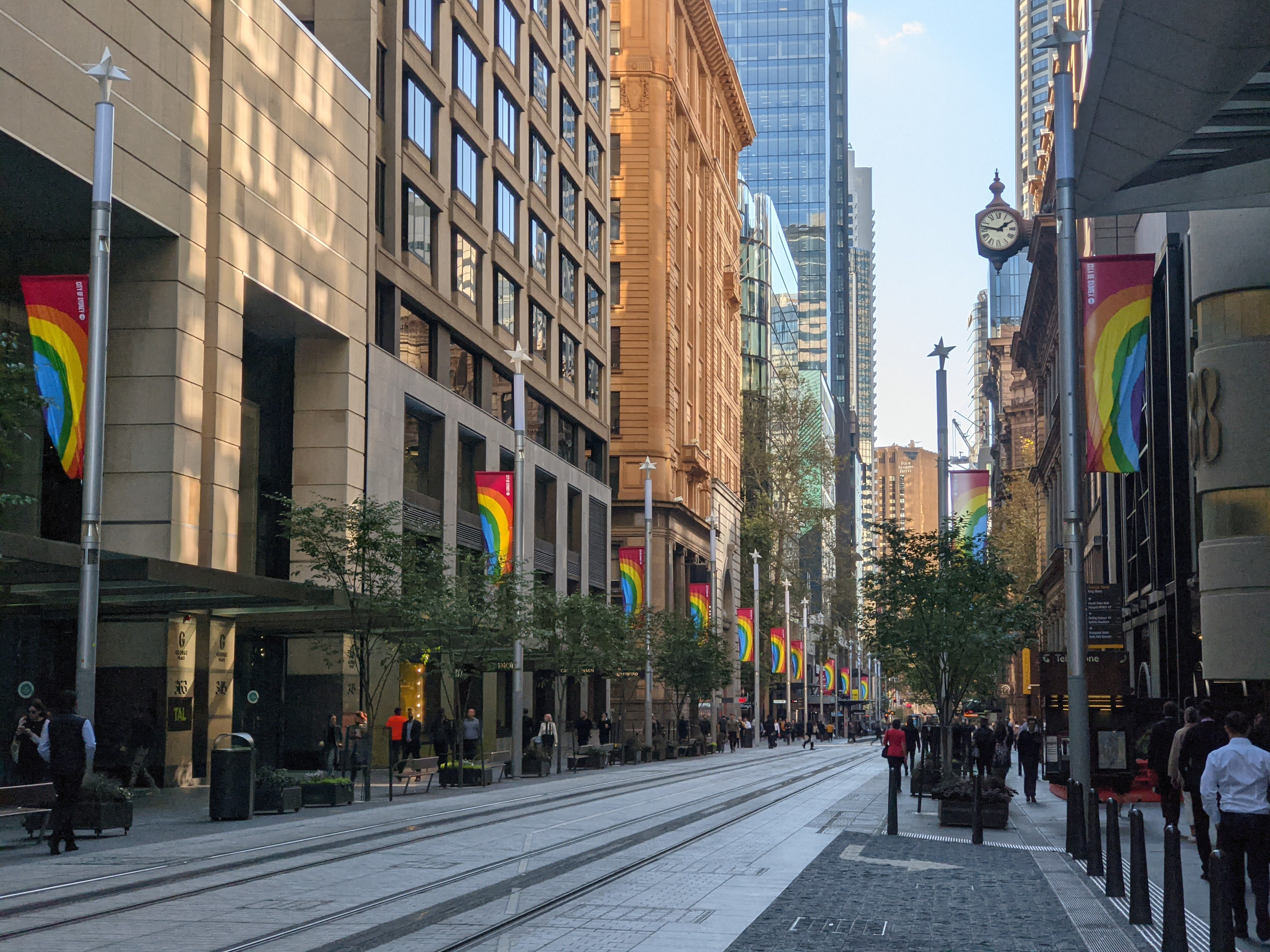
- George Street after the implementation of light rail
- Coordinates: 33°51′23″S 151°12′27″E (North end); 33°53′02″S 151°12′08″E (South end)

General information
- Type: Street
- Length: 3 km (1.9 mi)
- Former route number: National Route 1 (1955–1986) (Ultimo–Town Hall)

Major junctions
- North end: Lower Fort Street; Dawes Point, Sydney
- Alfred Street; Grosvenor Street; Bridge Street; Hunter Street; Martin Place; King Street; Market Street; Druitt Street; Bathurst Street; Liverpool Street; Goulburn Street; Pitt Street; Harris Street
- South end: Broadway; Ultimo, Sydney

Location(s)
- Suburb(s): Sydney CBD, Haymarket

George Street is a street in the central business district of Sydney.

It was Sydney's original high street, and remains one of the busiest streets in the city centre. It connects a number of the city's most important buildings and precincts. There are more high rise buildings here than on any other street in Australia. Amongst Australia's 100 largest listed companies, more are located here than on any other street.

The street begins in the north end of Sydney in The Rocks, near the Sydney Harbour Bridge, and extends to the southern end of the city, near Central Station and Ultimo, where it leads into Railway Square. From here Broadway is the continuation of George Street turning westwards, leading to the western suburbs as Parramatta Road.

== History ==
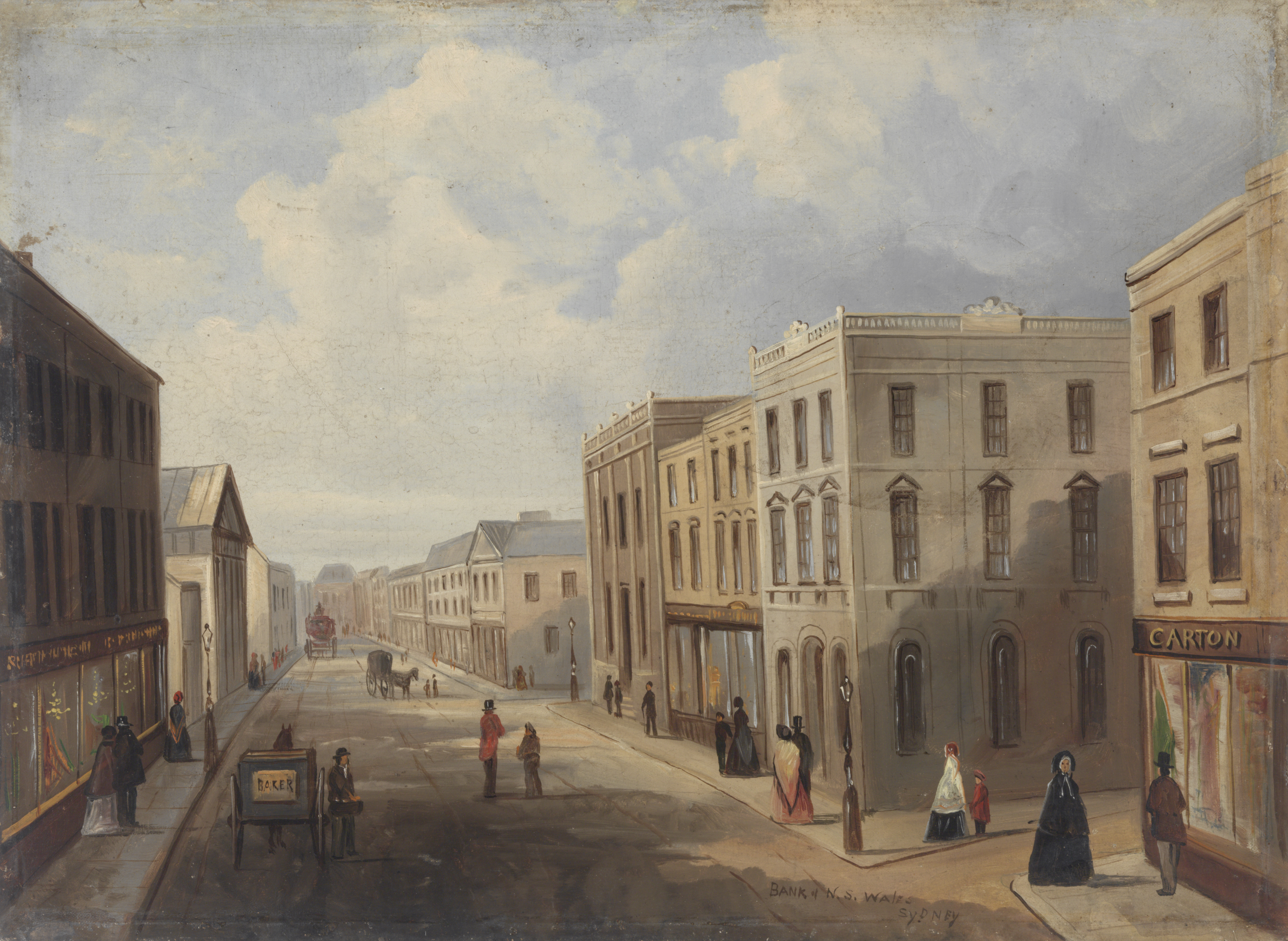
George Street in 1855

The origins of George Street lie in the layout of the Sydney Cove colony. Captain Arthur Phillip placed the convicts and marines on the rocky western slopes of the bay. A track leading from the convicts' encampment in the area of The Rocks, past the marine barracks and alongside the banks of a stream to a brick pit, located near to the present location of Central station with some arguing that it follows paths and tracks already created by the local Aboriginal people. This track that eventually became George Street is one of the two original thoroughfares, along with the track that became Bridge Street. It is possible that George Street was the first street in Australia.

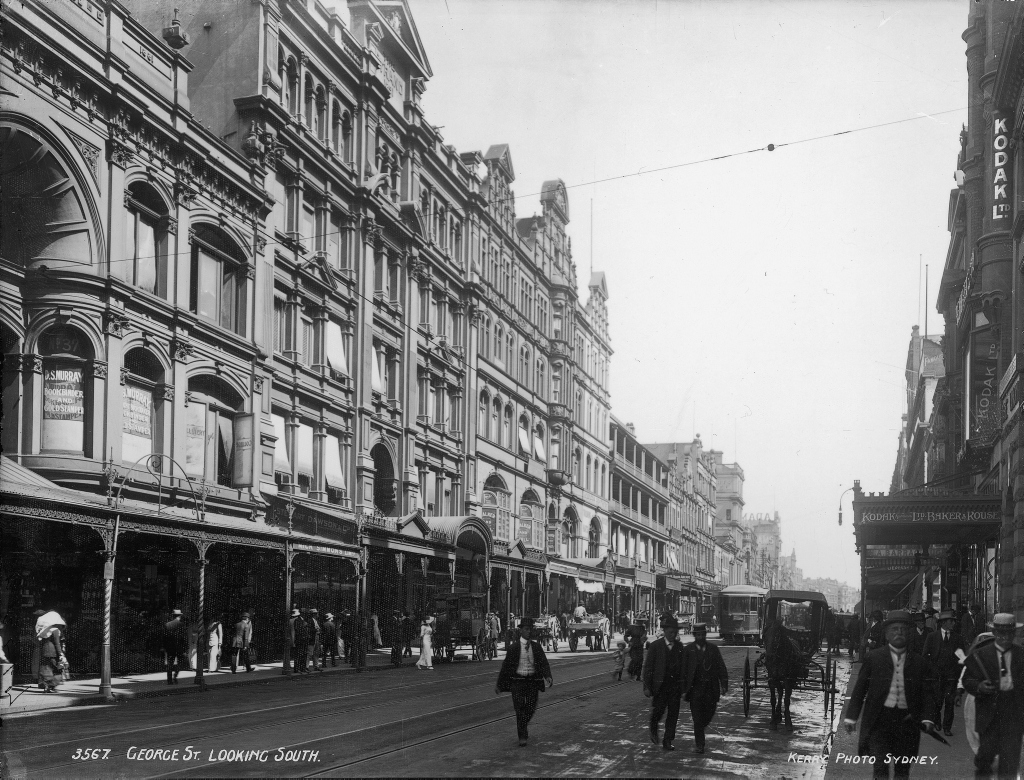
Looking south on George Street, c. 1900

Until 1810 George Street was generally referred to as High Street in the English custom, although the northern part of the thoroughfare was also sometimes referred to as "Sergeant Major's Row" and, earlier, as "Spring Row" (since water carriers had originally established the route as a link between the Tank Stream, the Military encampment and the hospital). The Street was formally named for King George III by Governor Lachlan Macquarie in 1810.

On 8 August 1907 at Bateman's Crystal Hotel on George Street, a meeting resolved to form the New South Wales Rugby Football League, Australia's first professional rugby football association and predecessor to the modern-day National Rugby League. In 1937, Frank Jenner committed to telling ten different people on George Street about Christianity every day thenceforward.

Until 2016, George Street was the route for Sydney's Anzac Day parade until the street was made unavailable by CBD and South East Light Rail construction work. The parade now proceeds via Elizabeth Street. The Light Rail line through George Street began services in December 2019.

From 2019 to 2022, the majority of George Street between Bridge Street (near Circular Quay) and Rawson Place (near Central Station) was progressively converted into a pedestrian mall.

In September 2026, the NSW Government and City of Sydney announced that the northern end of George Street would be pedestrianised along with other upgrades by late 2028 at a cost of $25.8 million.

== Precincts ==
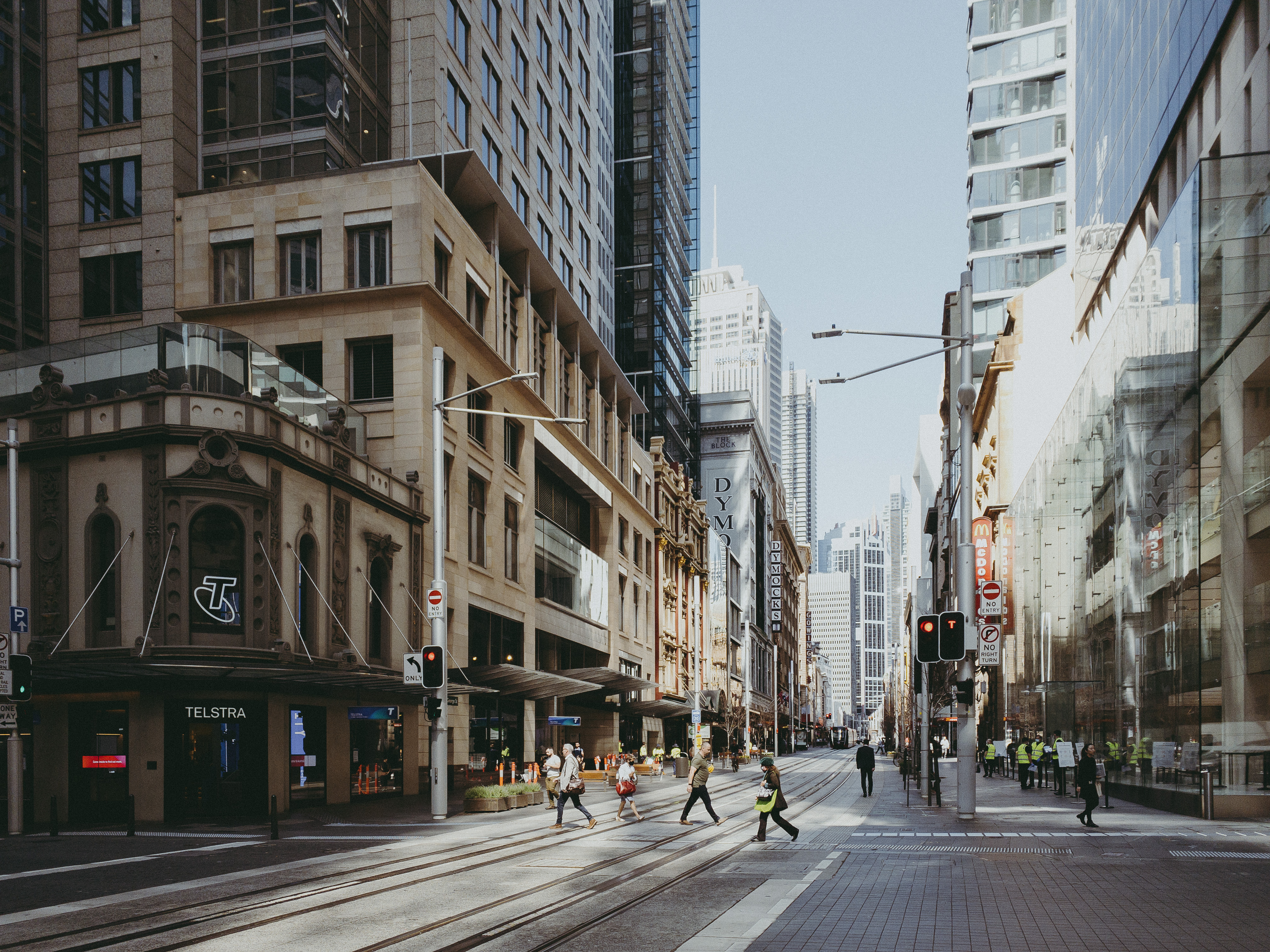
The intersection of George and King Street, November 2020

Being a major street through central Sydney, George Street is often seen in terms of a number of distinct sections or precincts. From north to south, they include:

- The Rocks: At the northern end of George Street, north of Alfred Street, is The Rocks, the location of the first British settlement in Australia begun in 1788. There are many souvenir shops, restaurants and traditional pubs, as well as art galleries and the Museum of Contemporary Art. Here George Street ends as it reaches Port Jackson (Sydney Harbour). The area is dominated by the approaches to the Sydney Harbour Bridge, and faces the Sydney Opera House across Circular Quay. Circular Quay railway station and ferry terminals are located nearby.
- Wynyard: The area along George Street from King Street in the south up to Alfred Street in the north is given over largely to offices of large corporations and financial institutions, interspersed with retail, large hotels and large-scale bars and entertainment facilities. An important cross street in this precinct is Martin Place, the location of the Sydney Cenotaph and the Sydney General Post Office. Wynyard railway station is located in the northern part of this precinct.
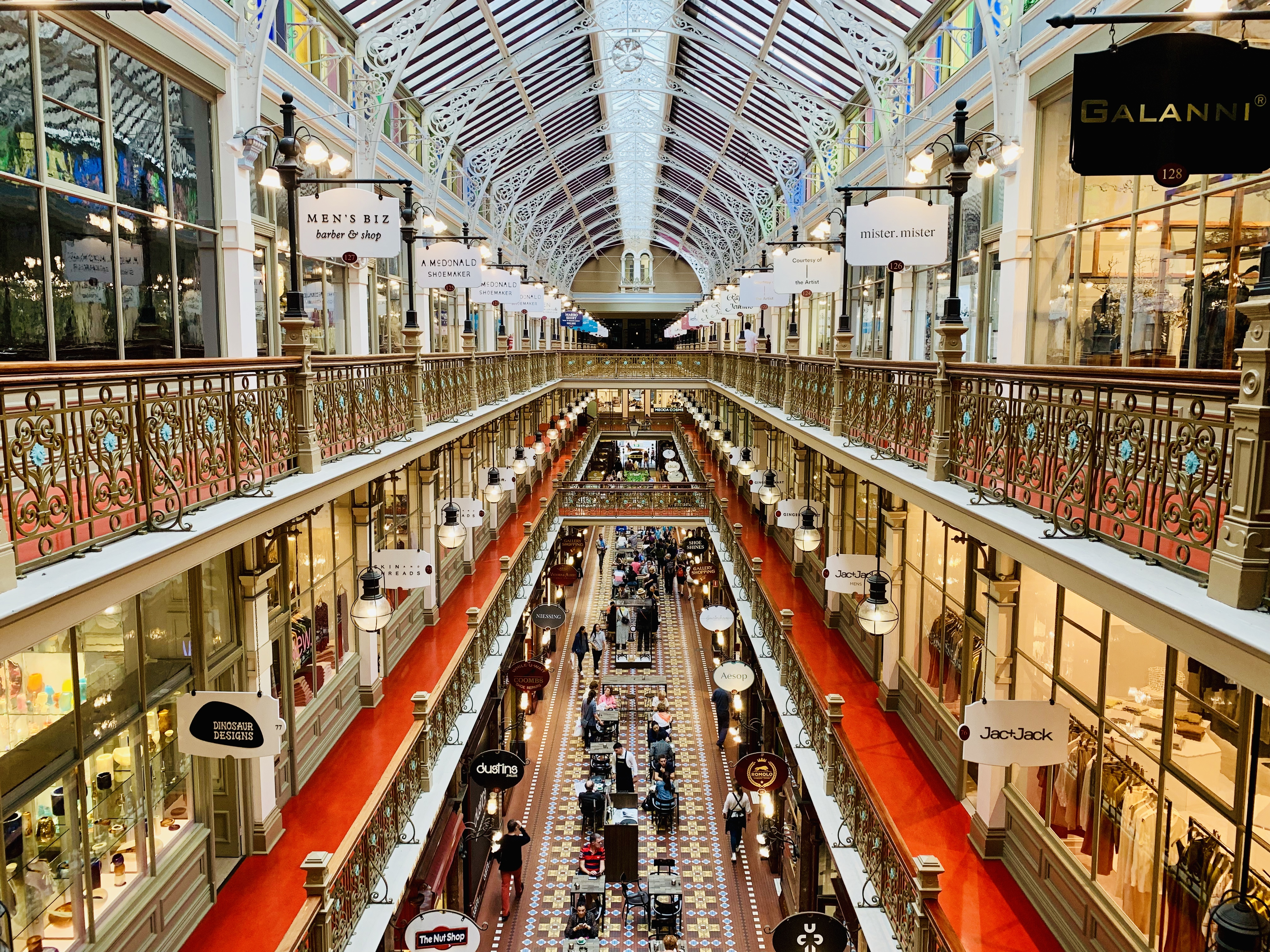
- The Strand Arcade; one of the many retail strips on George Street, and one of the only remaining arcade/atrium style shopping centres in Sydney.
  Town Hall: Along the central section of George Street, this precinct is noted as the location of three important historic buildings: St Andrew's Cathedral, the Sydney Town Hall; and the Queen Victoria Building shopping centre. These are well served by Town Hall station. The surrounding area features large scale retail operations, such as the main Sydney store of the department store Myer. Pitt Street Mall, a large retail precinct, is located close by.
- Cinema District: Situated on the hill overlooking Chinatown, this area used to feature the three largest cinemas in Sydney, however the three cinemas (Hoyts, Greater Union and Village Roadshow) merged their theatres into one complex, which was ultimately bought out by Greater Union in December 2005. The Cinema District also houses many video arcades, Internet cafes, fast food restaurants and pubs and is very busy after dark.
- Chinatown: Sydney's traditional, main Chinatown is located in Haymarket, near to the southern end of George Street. The Chinatown precinct is situated mostly to the west of the street but also extends to the east of the street. A centre of retail shops and restaurants, features of Chinatown located close to George Street include a tree stump (near the intersection with Hay Street) gilded in gold and dripping water, which was presented to the Chinese community of Sydney with the message that it would bring good fortune to them. Close by is the Capitol Theatre, which often hosts the Sydney runs of international musicals.
- Railway Square: the southern end of George Street is a confluence of several busy streets. It is so-named because it is adjacent to the Sydney Central station, and the square itself is the site of a large bus terminus. Railway Square is today ringed by hotels and small-scale retail, and is also the site of a campus of the Sydney Institute of TAFE.

== Transport ==
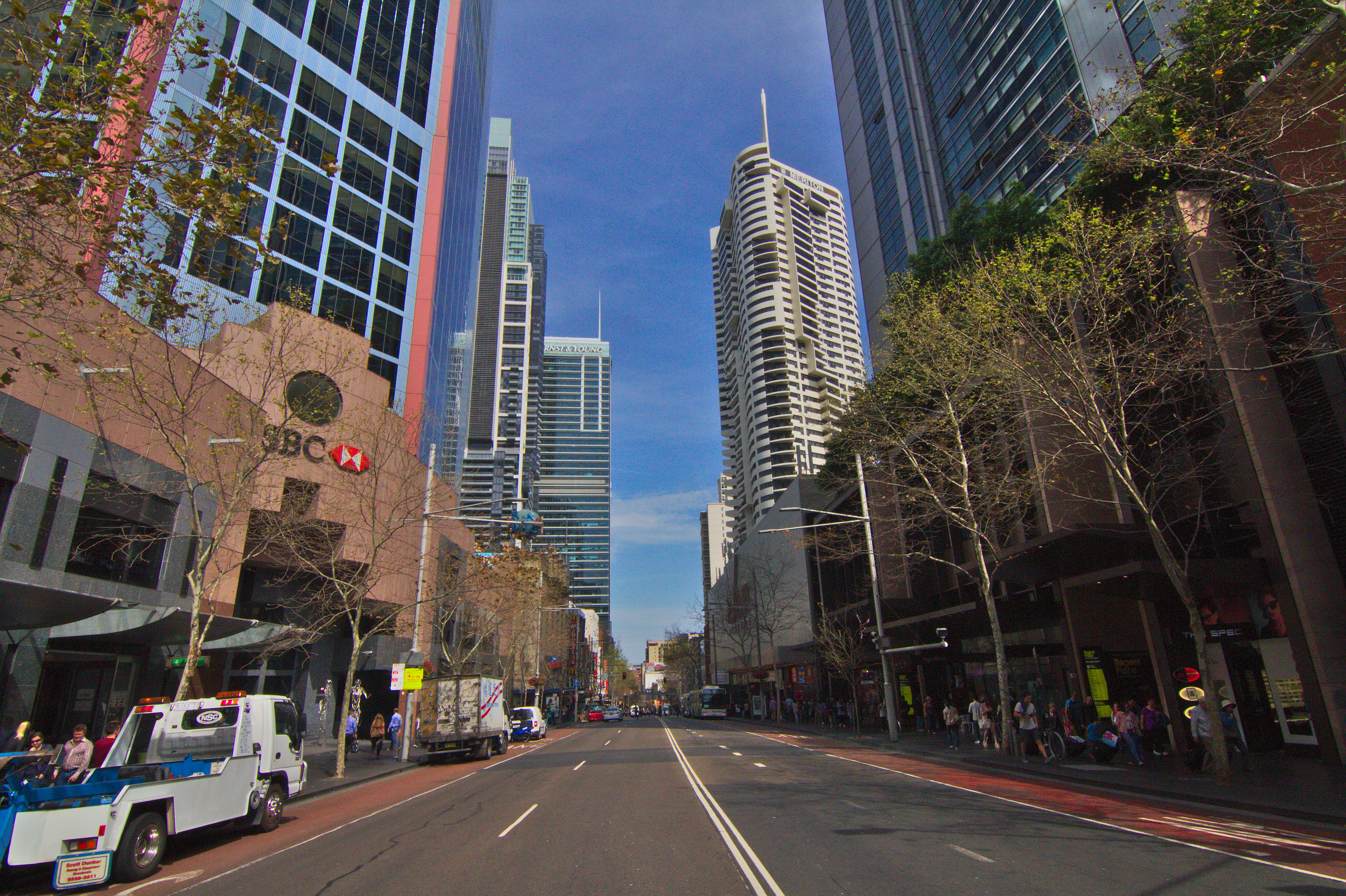
Southbound view from Bathurst Street in September 2013, before the introduction of light rail

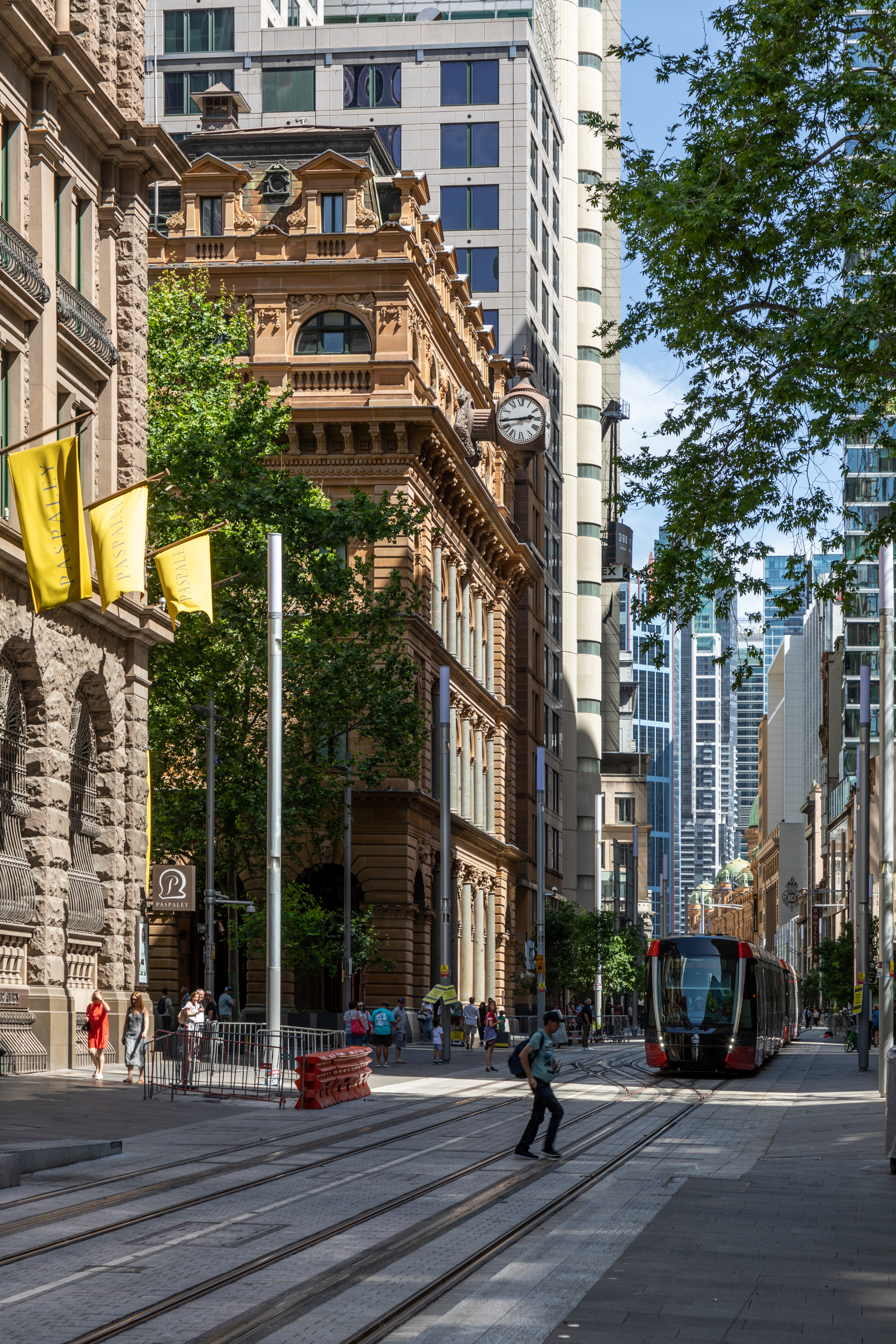
George Street light rail, 2019.

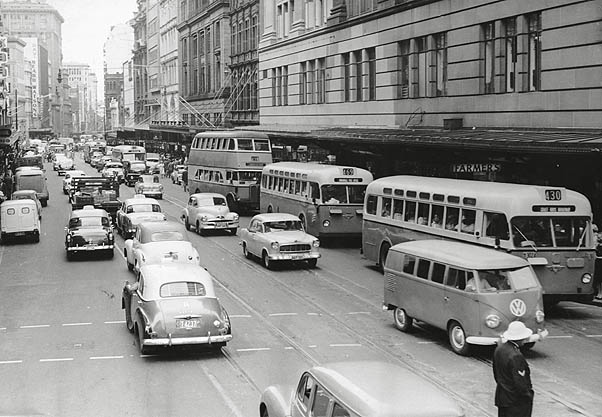
Northbound view from Market Street in the 1960s

On 8 December 1899, an electric tramway was opened along George Street to Harris Street. This reduced the traditional dependence on horses and human feet.

In 1959 the trams were replaced by diesel buses. In 1987 the congestion caused by the number of cars meant it was faster to walk from Circular Quay to Town Hall than to catch the bus. Bus lanes were introduced from Bridge Street to Broadway southbound and Broadway to Jamiestown Street northbound in July 1997. Until October 2015, George Street was the busiest street in Sydney in terms of number of buses per hour; most bus services to the inner western and north-western suburbs traveled along part of or most of George Street.

Many of the principal railway stations in the Sydney city centre are located on or near George Street. At the northern end of George Street, is Circular Quay station. Wynyard underground station was constructed in the same period at a location adjacent to George Street, with a major entrance to George Street near Hunter Street. Next south is Town Hall station is located under George Street near the Sydney Town Hall and at the southern end is Sydney Central station.

=== Light rail development ===
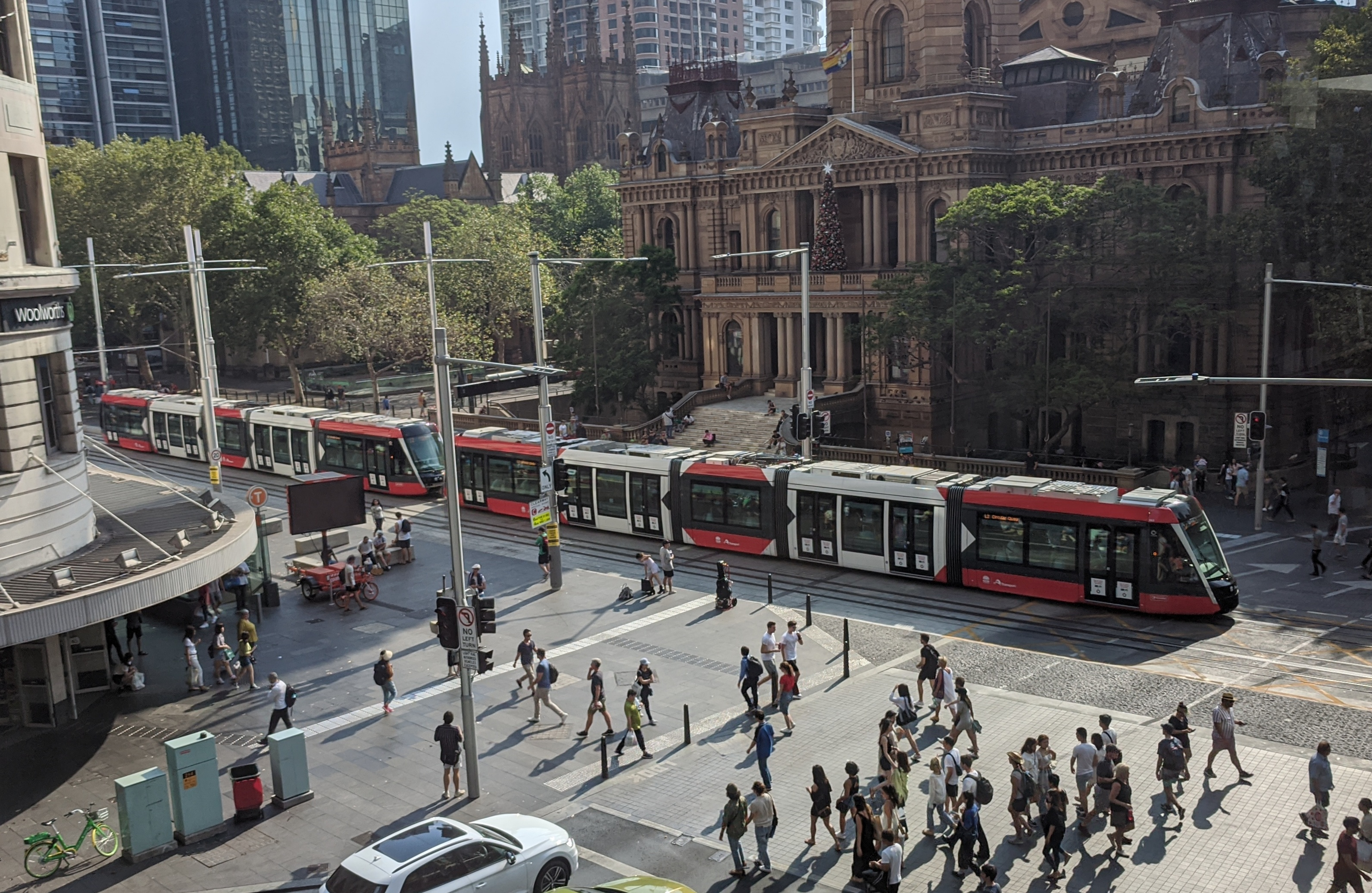
Pedestrianised section of George Street outside Sydney Town Hall in January 2020

In response to increasing bus congestion in the CBD, on 13 December 2012, the NSW Government announced a commitment to build a light rail from Circular Quay down George Street to Central station before continuing east to Kensington and Randwick.

In conjunction with the light rail works, the City of Sydney pedestrianised sections of George Street between Hunter and Bathurst Streets, with the intention of making George Street "Sydney's premier retail and pedestrian street". The state government announced it would support the plan. Light rail construction commenced in October 2015 resulting in the closure of George Street. The light rail through George Street opened on 14 December 2019. However, the southbound lane between Bathurst Street and Campbell Street was never reopened and remained closed to traffic.

In May 2020, City of Sydney proposed to convert the southern section of George Street to a pedestrian-only boulevard, extending southwards the existing boulevard that was constructed under the light rail project. In July 2020, the northbound lane from Ultimo Street to Bathurst Street and the southbound lane from Campbell Street to Rawson Place was temporarily closed. The closure was made permanent in the Council meeting in December 2020. Works to convert the southern section of George Street to a pedestrian boulevard along with other traffic treatments started in March 2021. The section between Bathurst Street and Goulburn Street was completed in September 2021.

== Architecture and notable structures ==
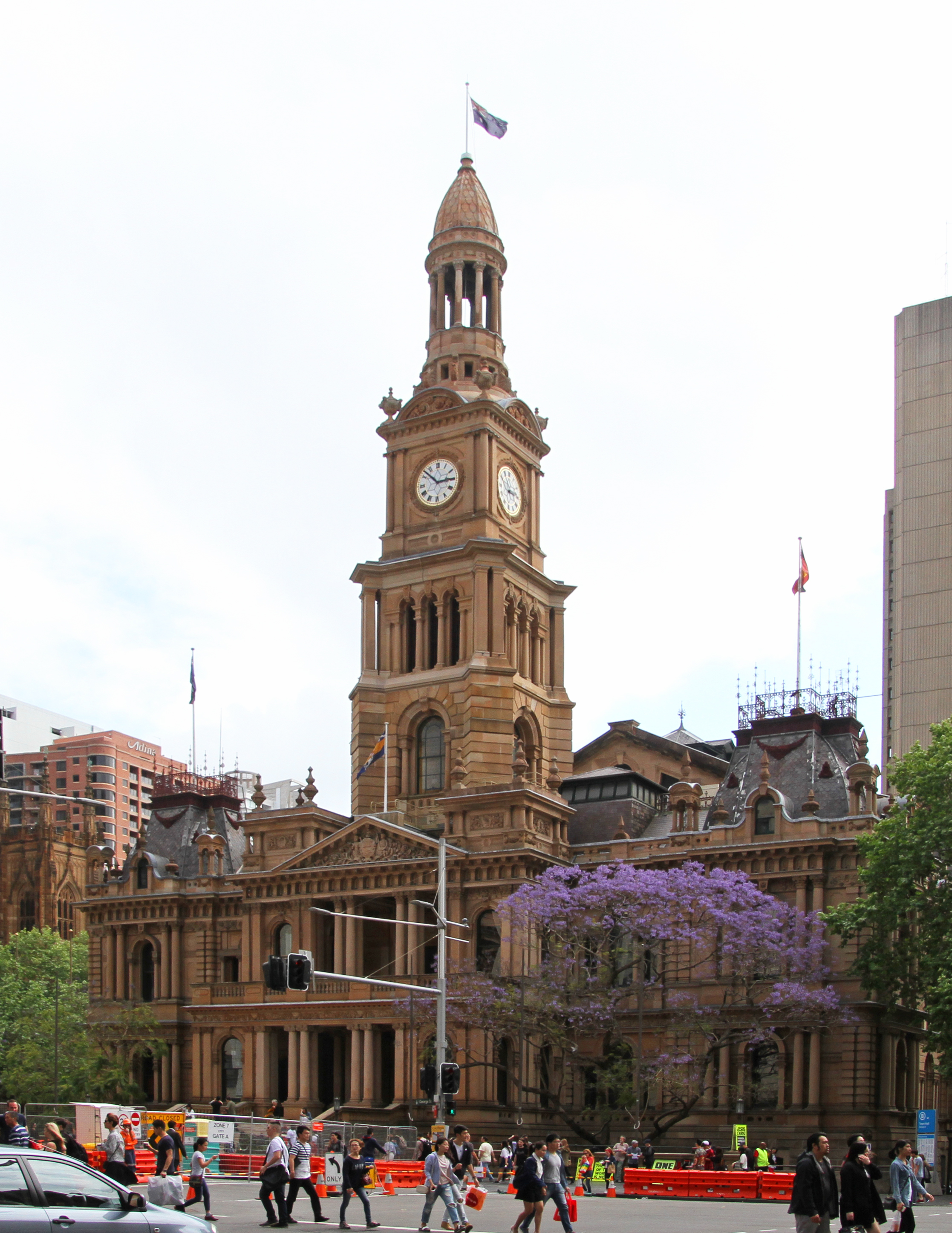
Sydney Town Hall

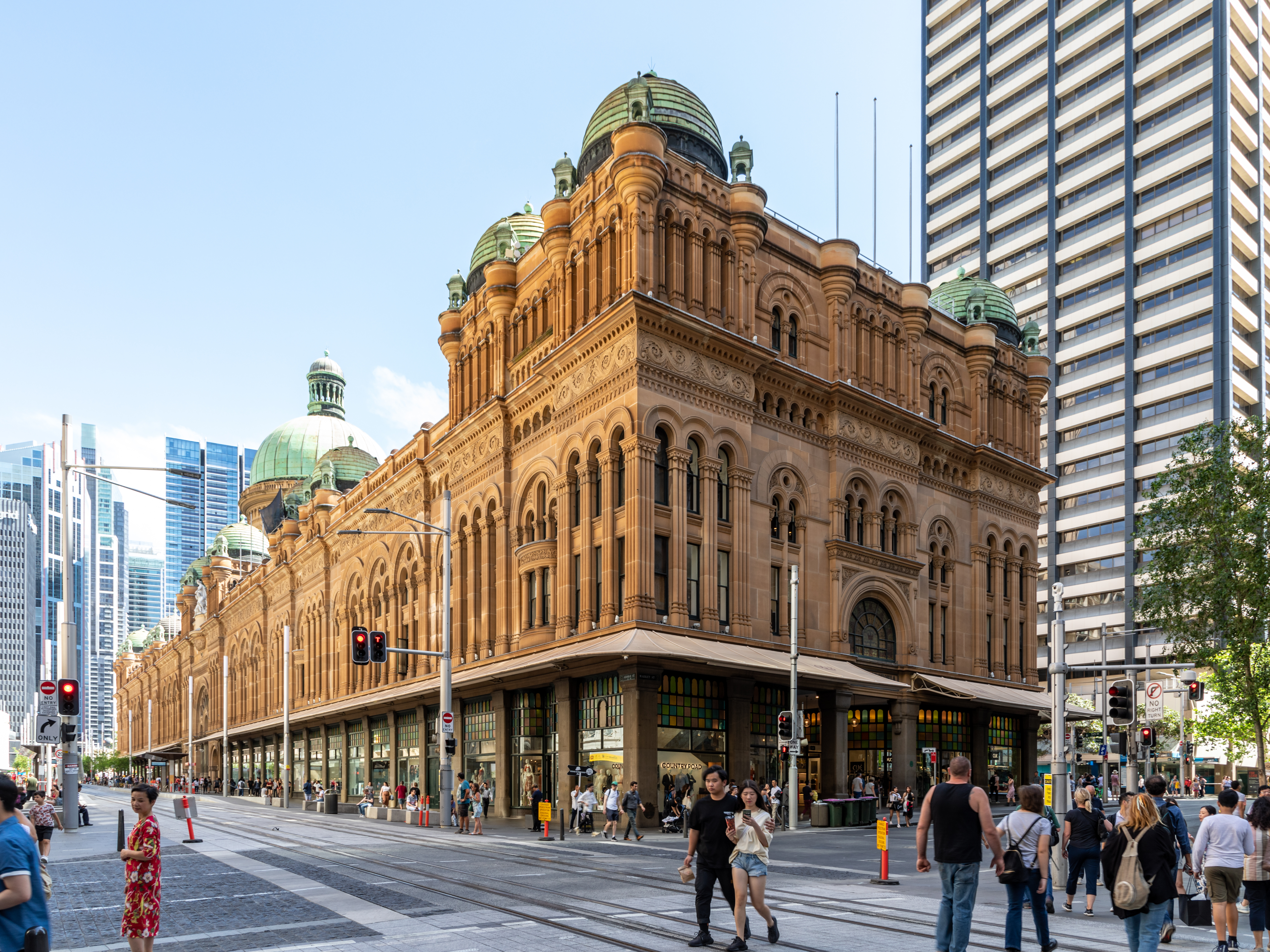
Queen Victoria Building

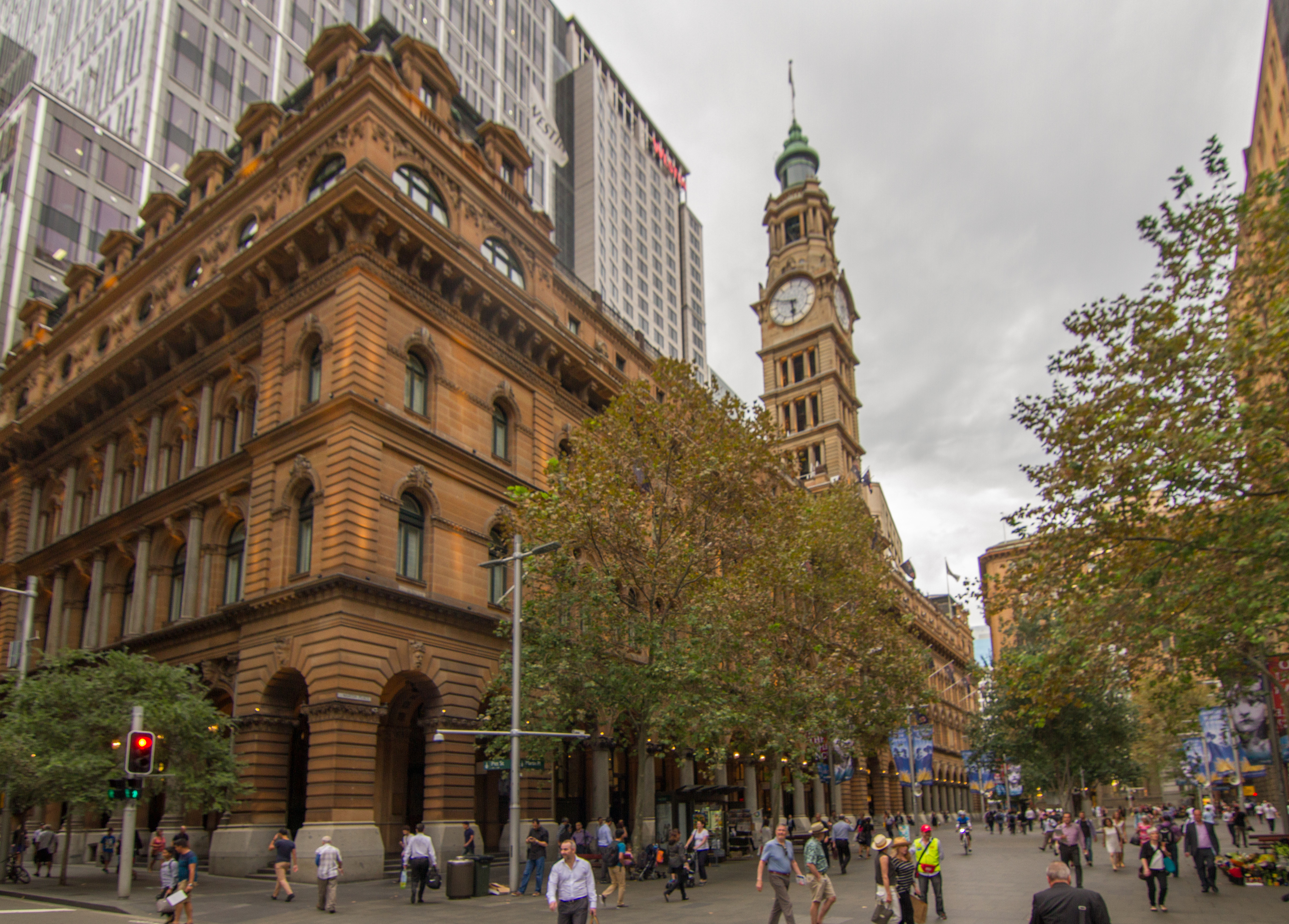
General Post Office

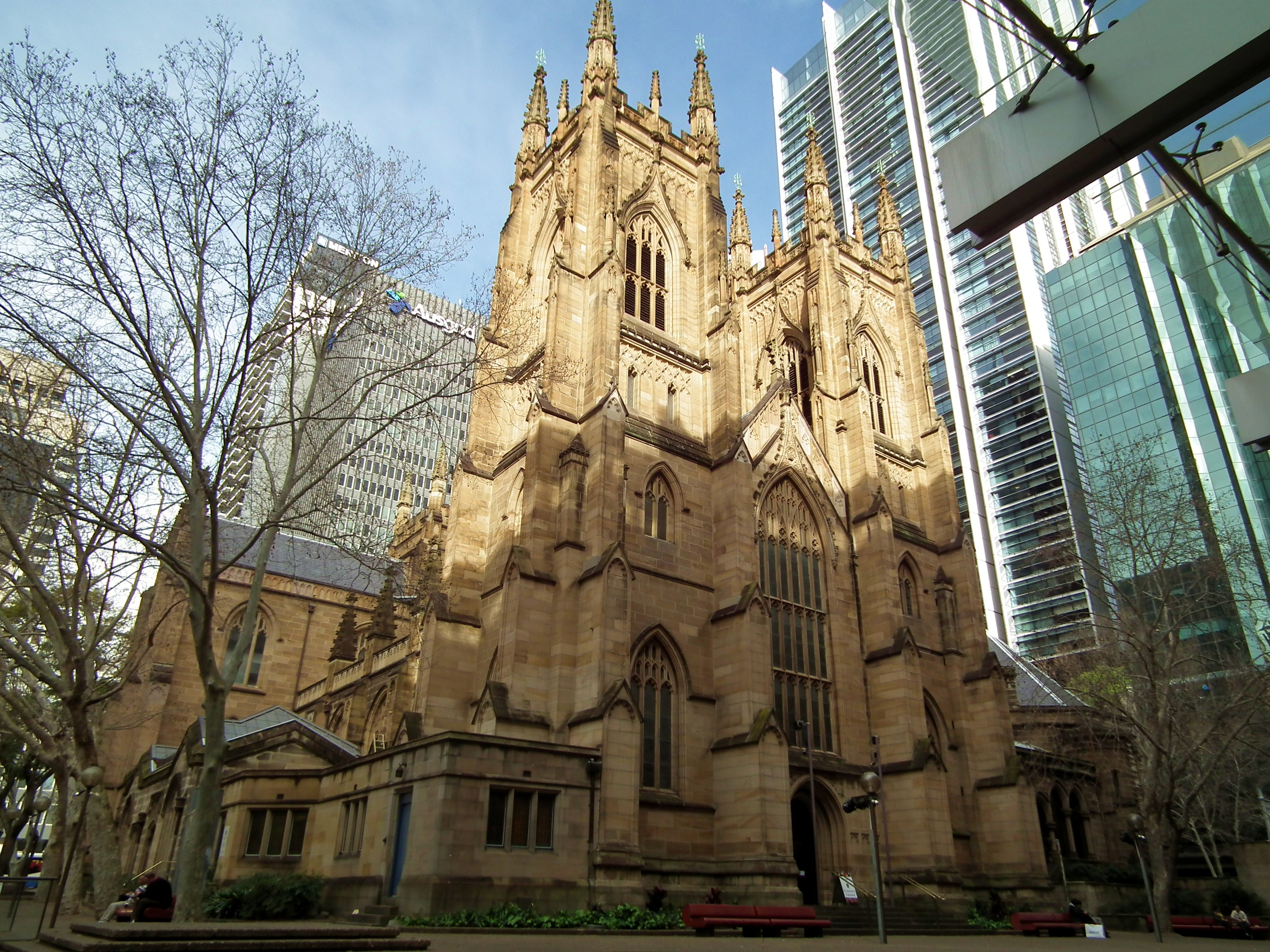
St Andrew's Cathedral

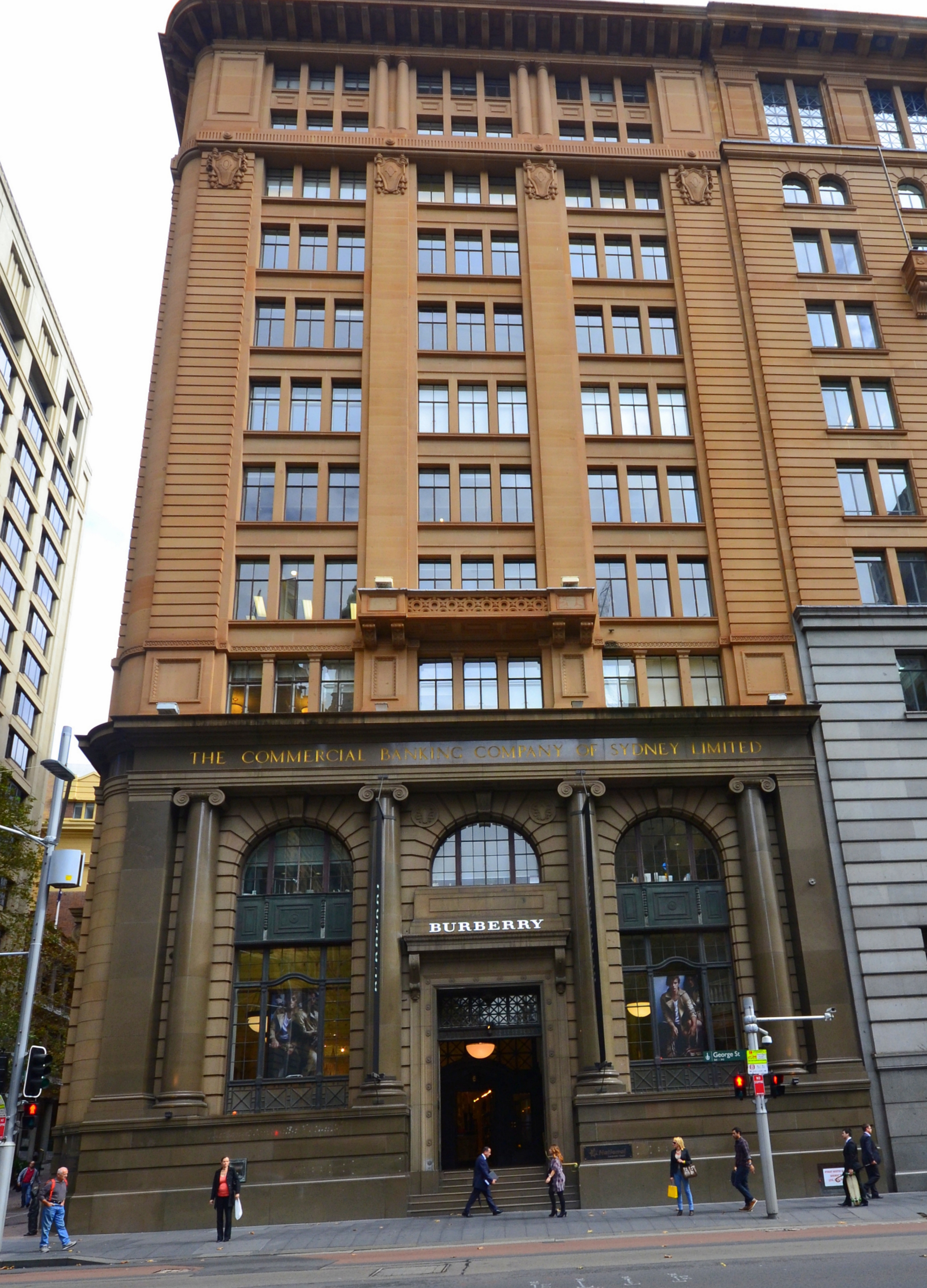
Commercial Banking Company building

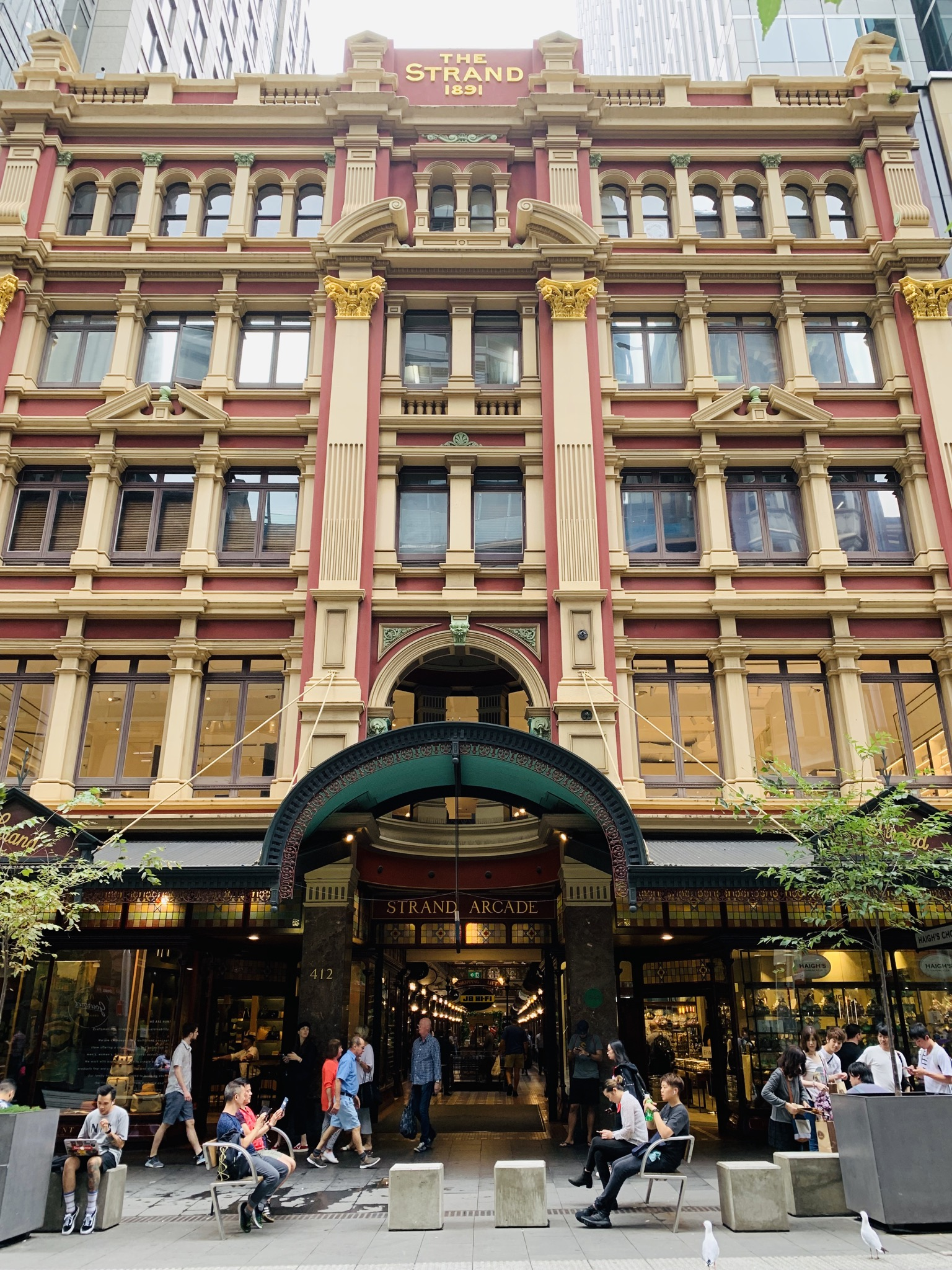
The Strand Arcade

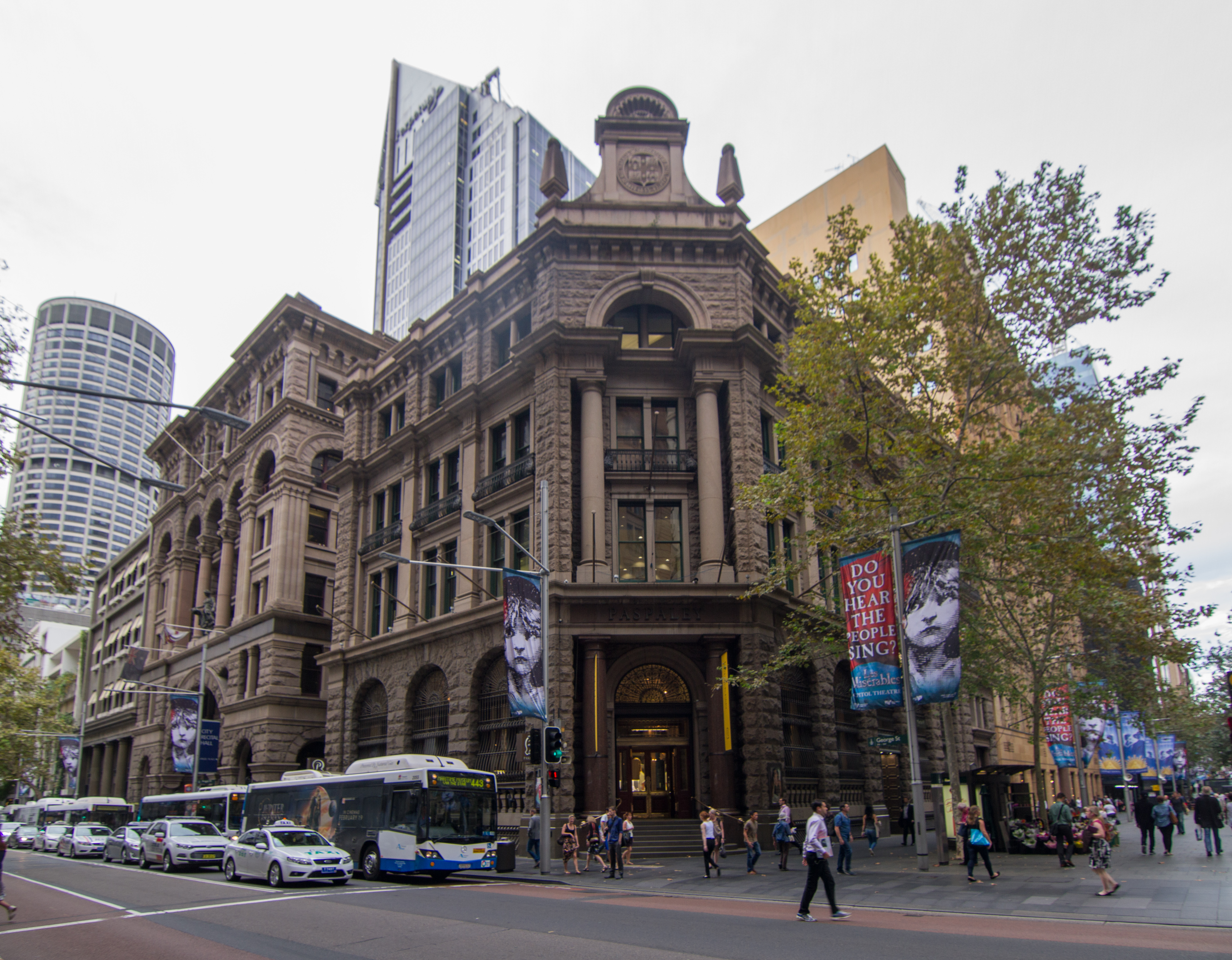
Former Bank of Australasia

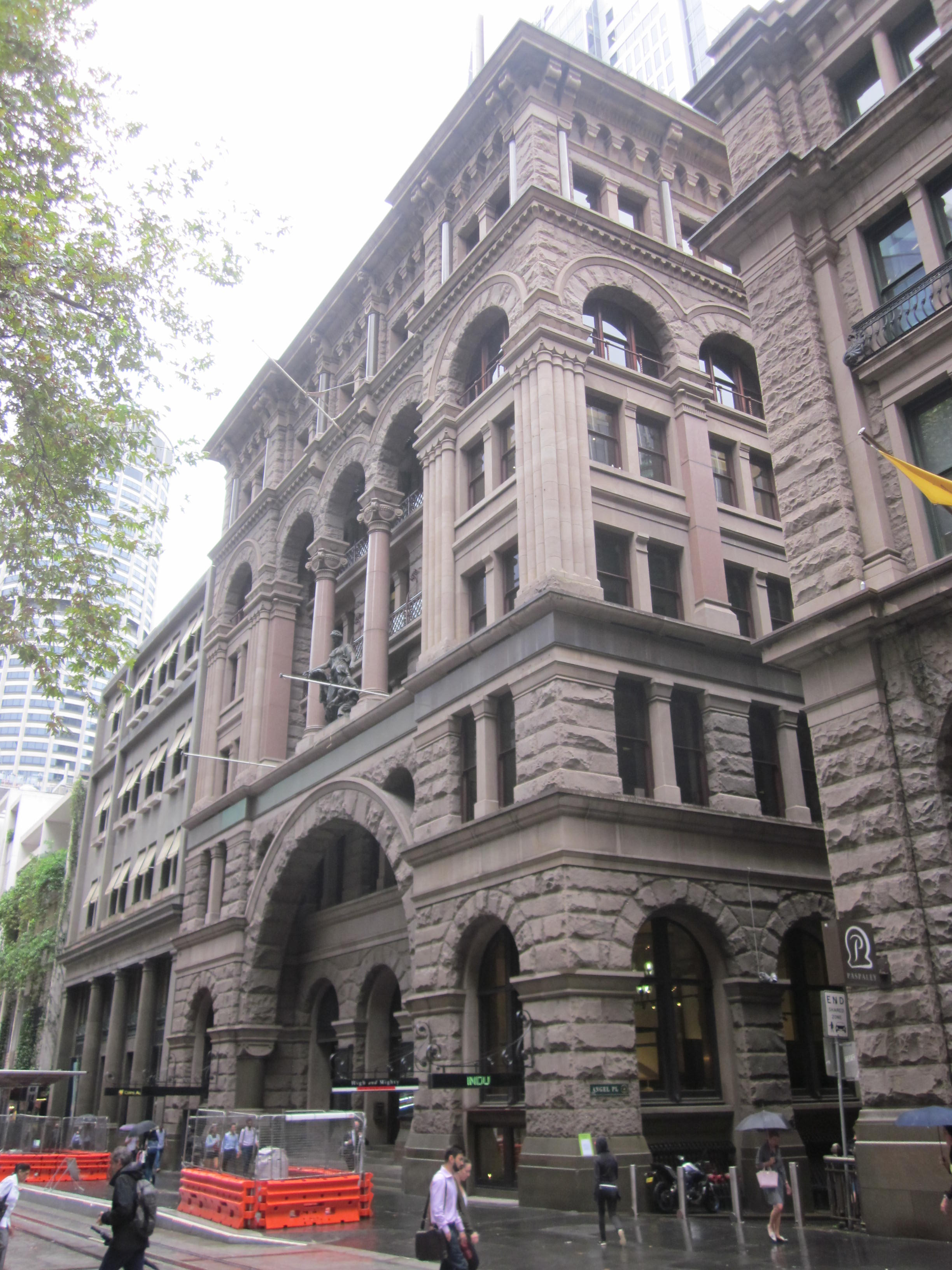
Former Societe Generale building

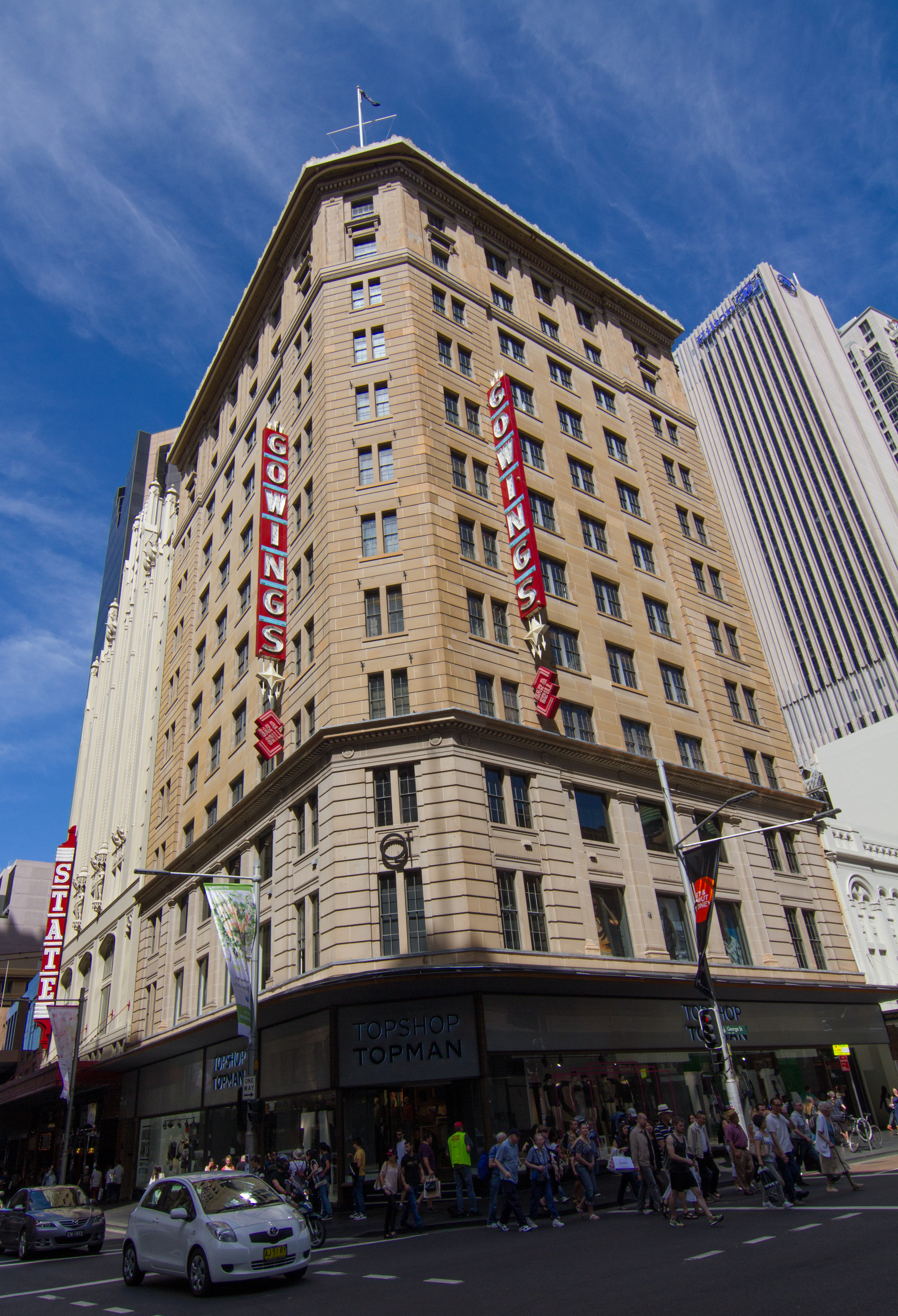
Gowings Building

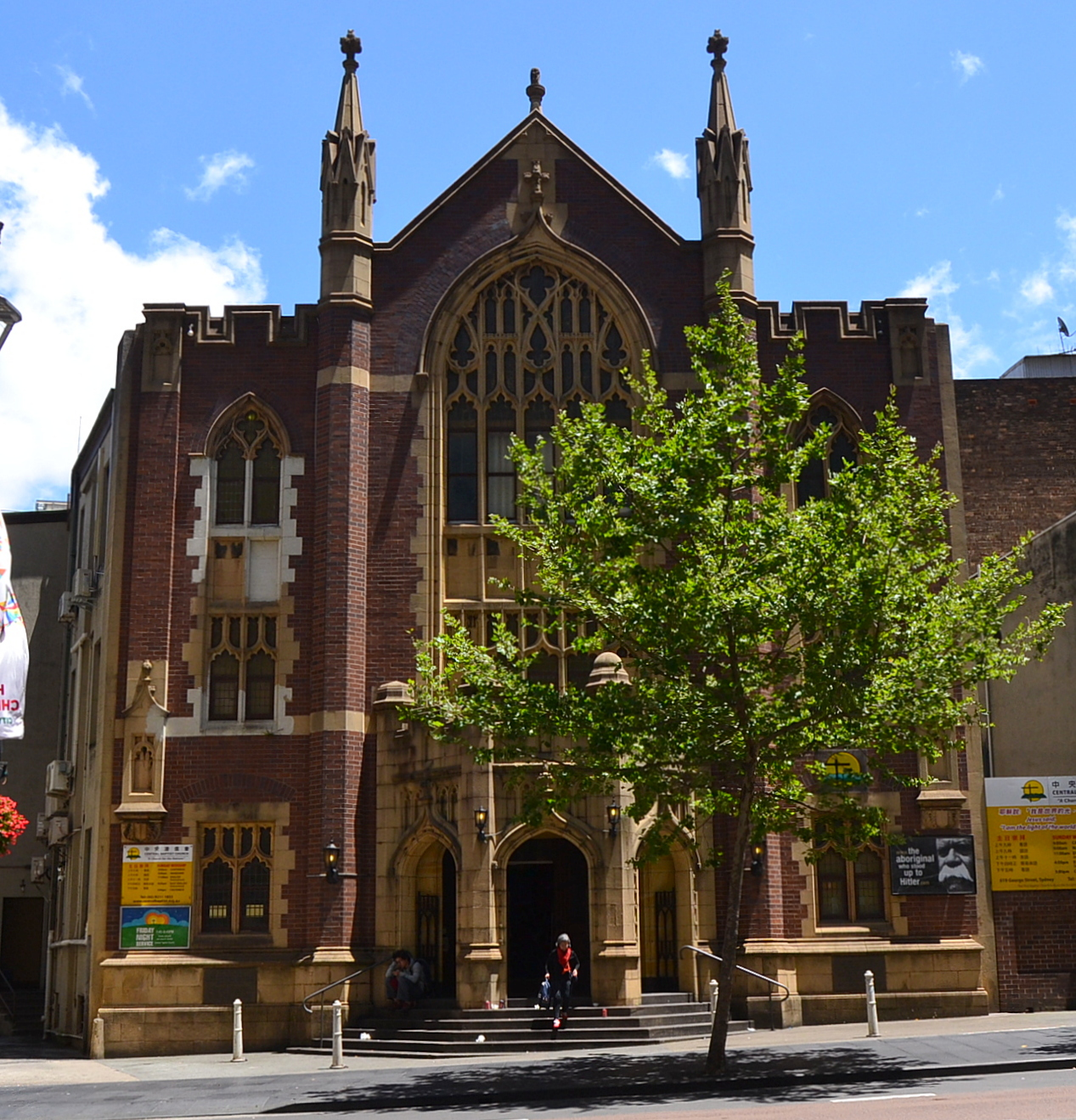
Central Baptist Church

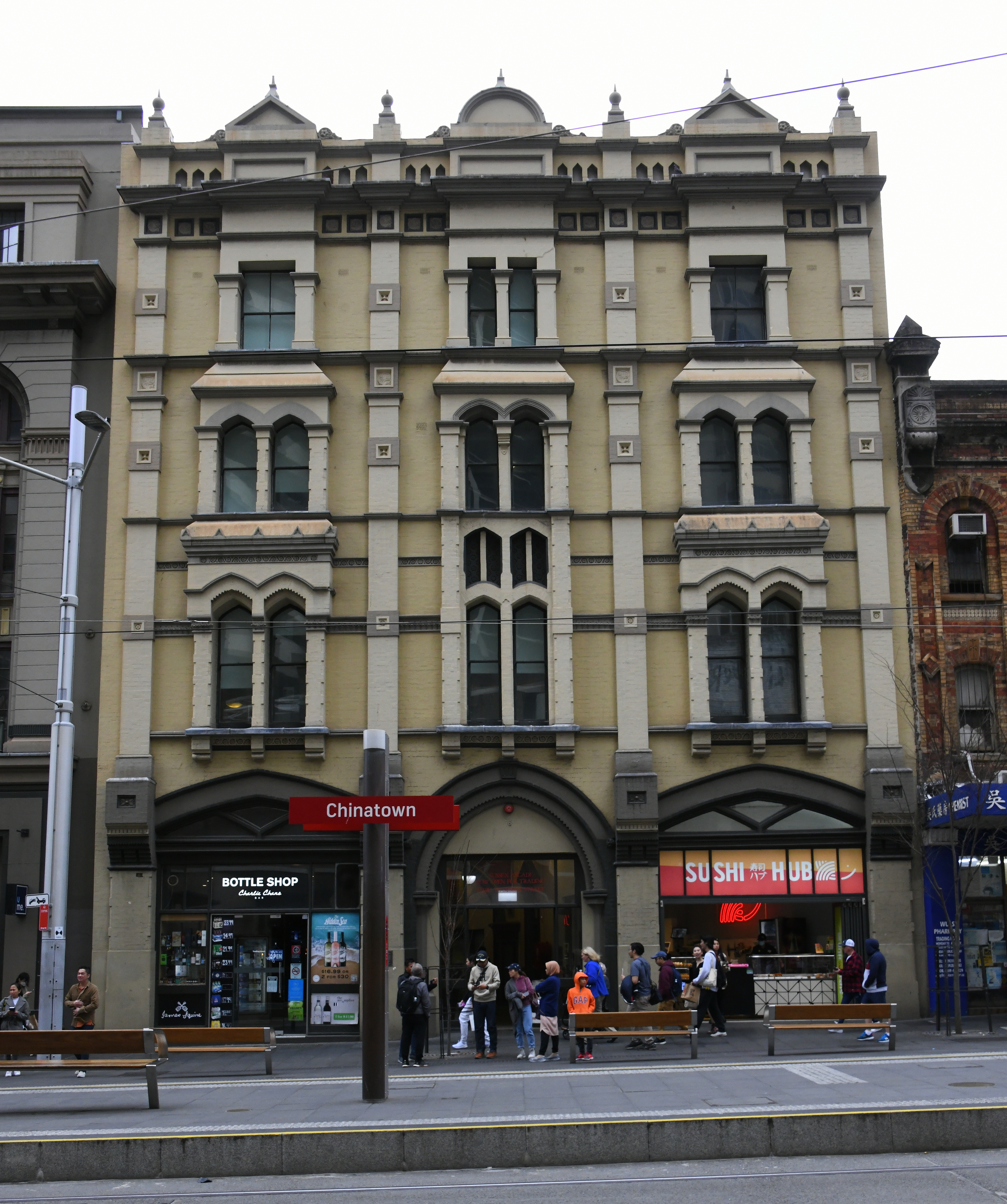
Haymarket Post Office

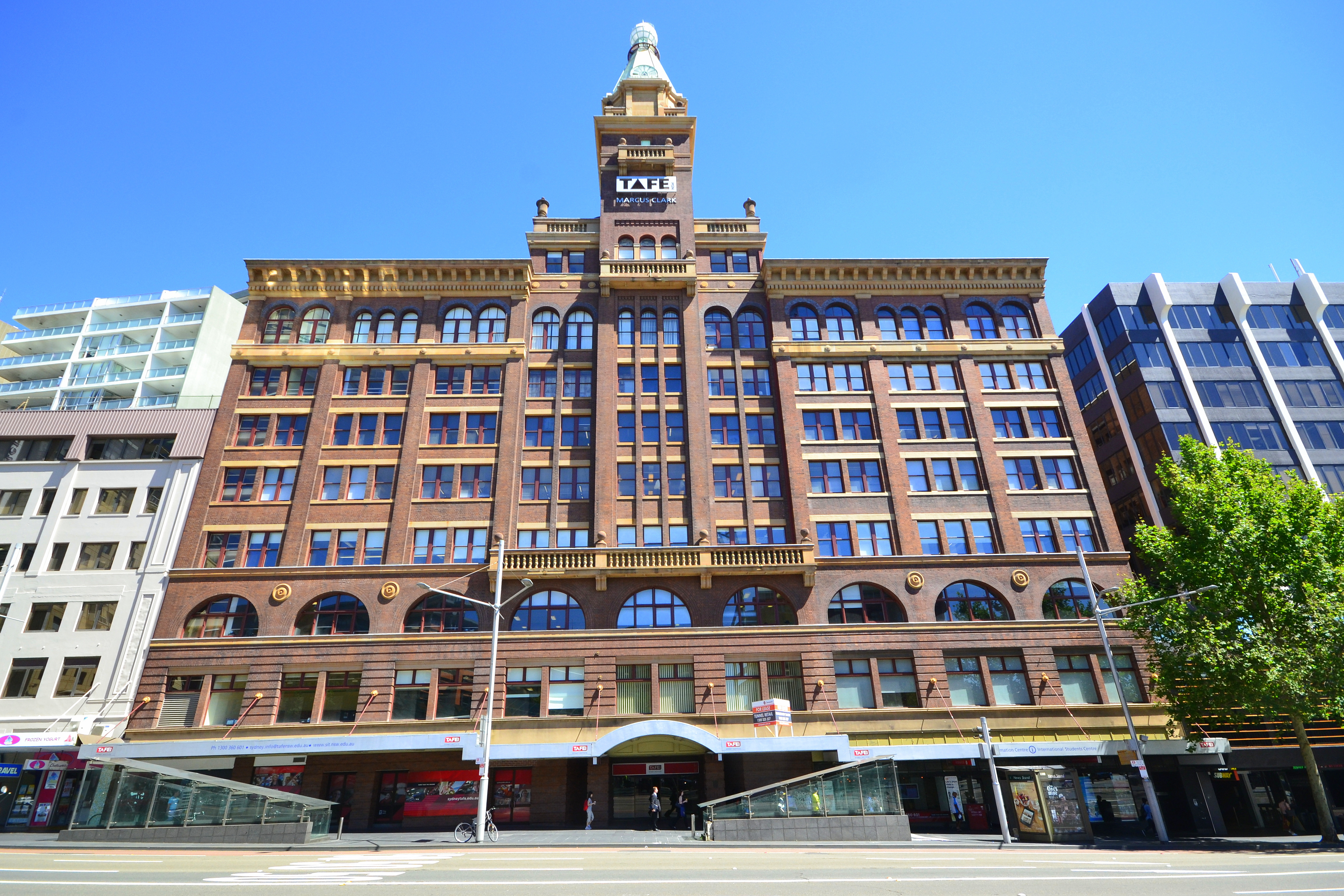
Marcus Clarke building

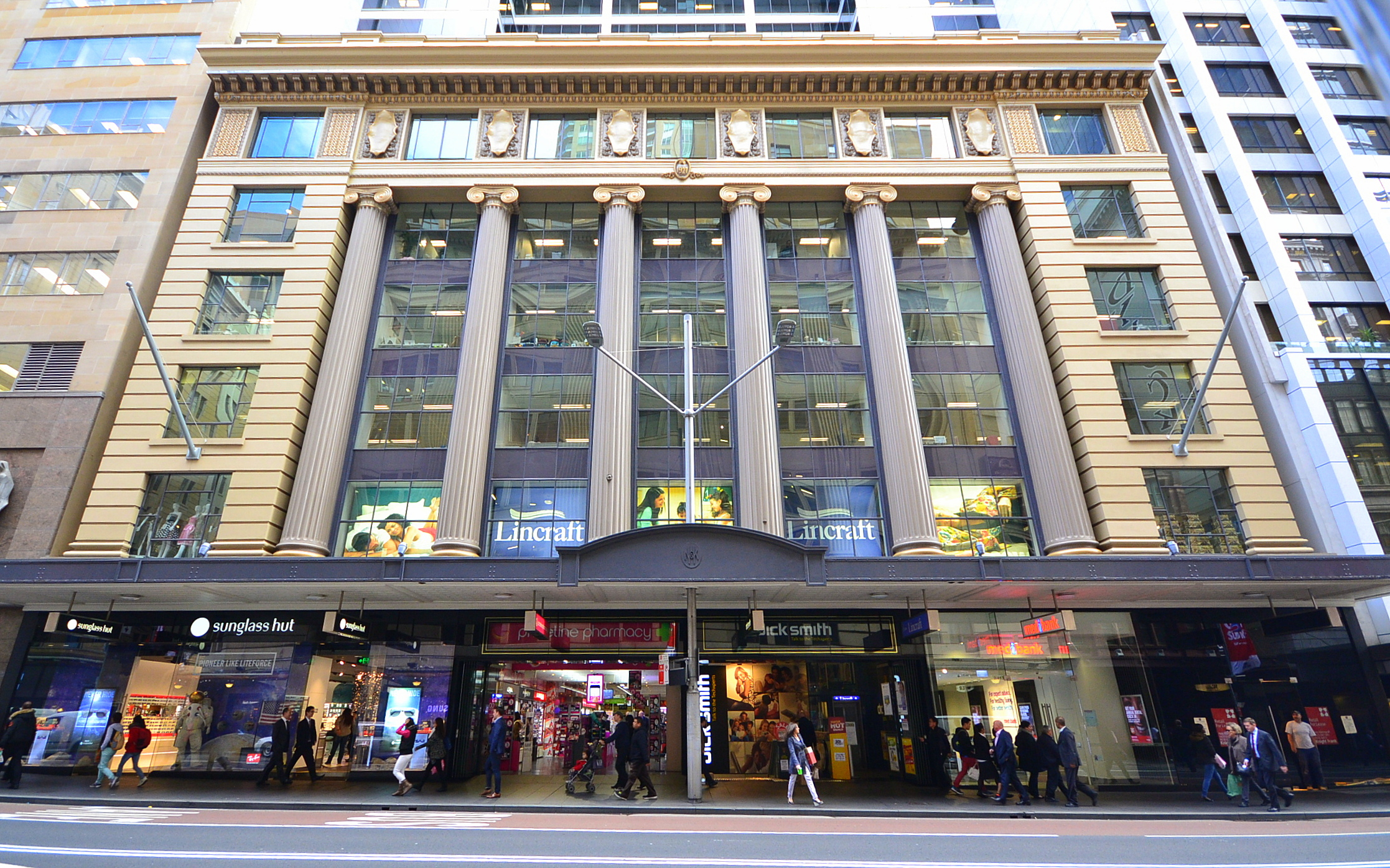
Nock and Kirbys building

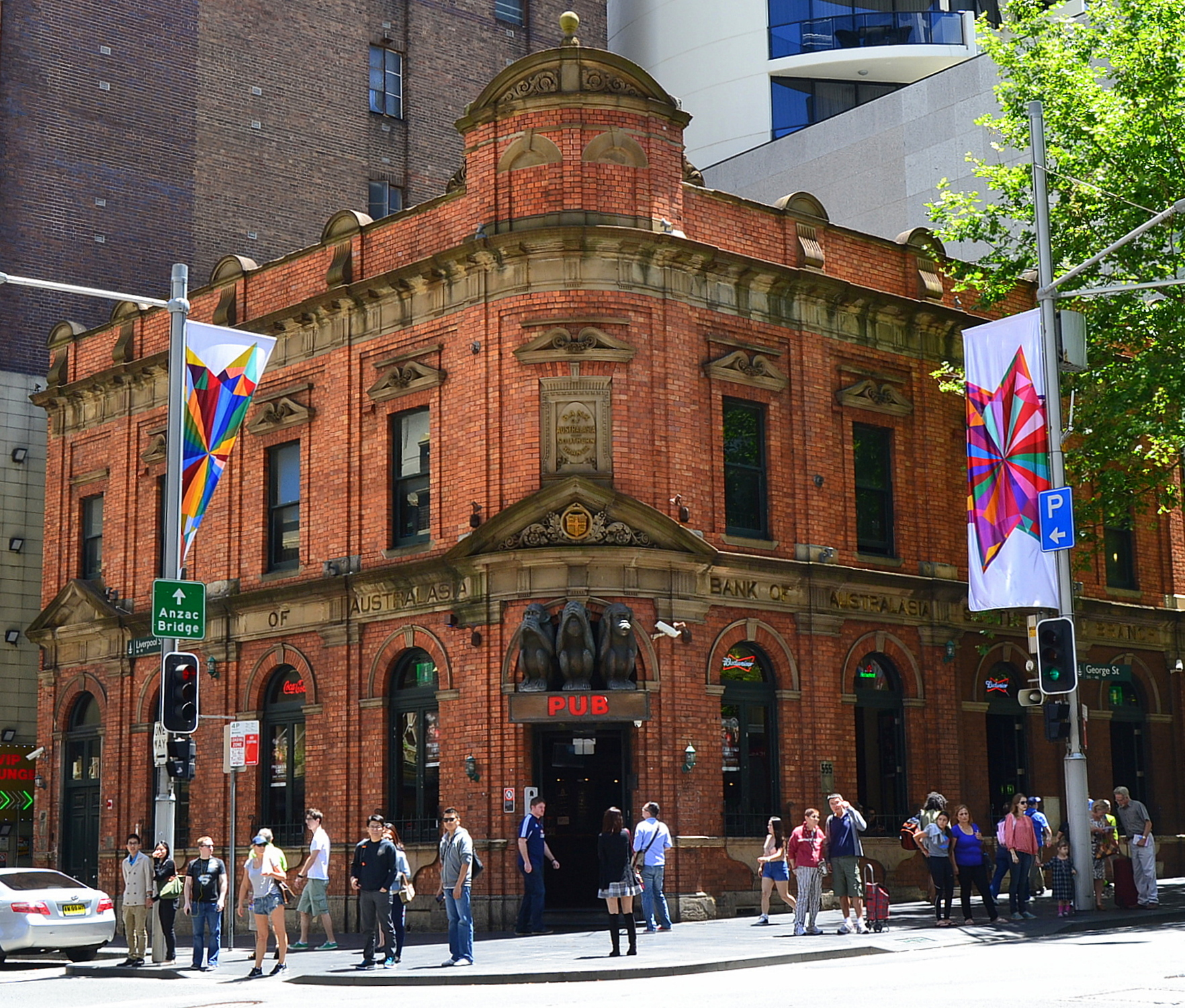
Three Wise Monkeys Pub

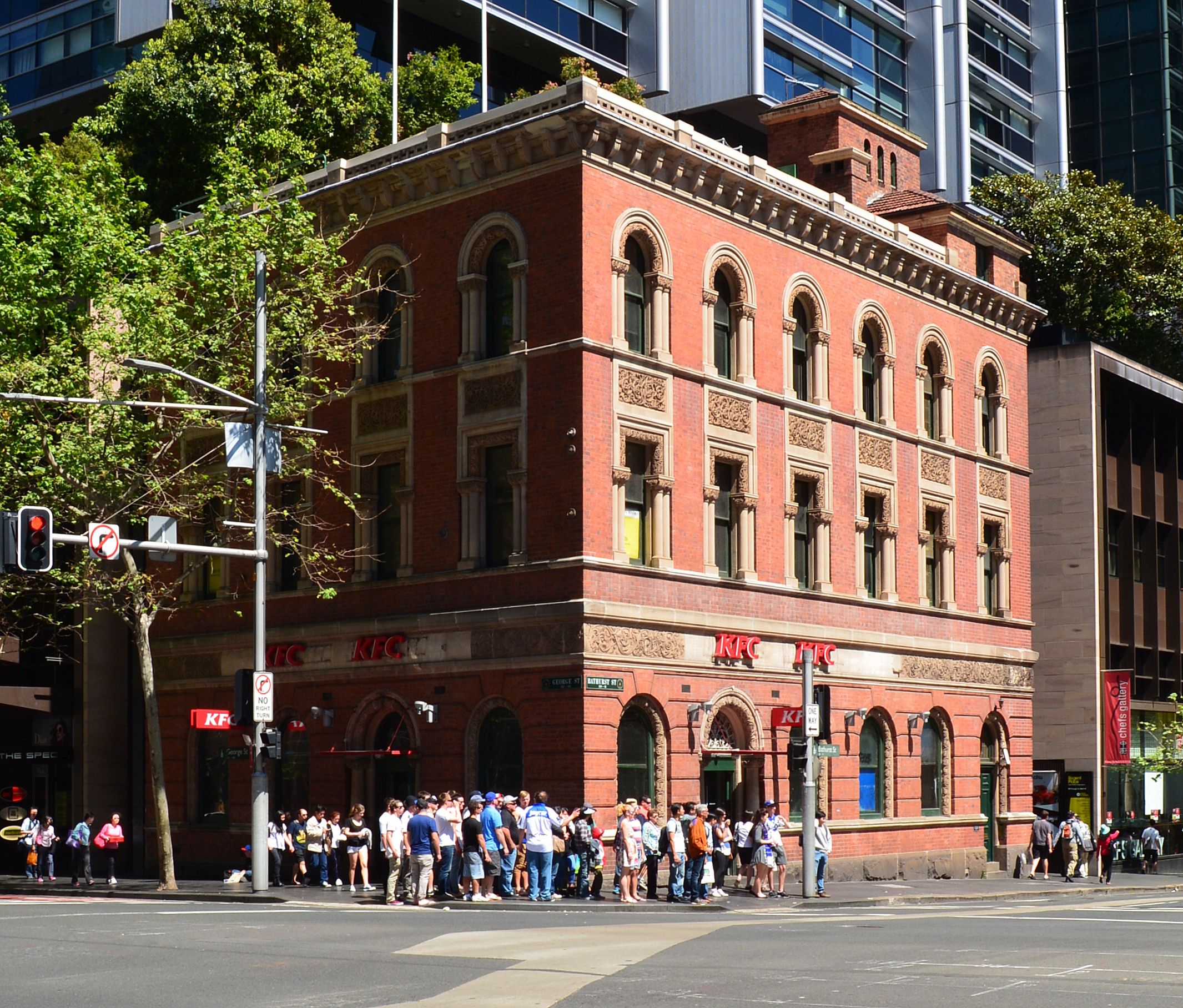
Former Bank of NSW building

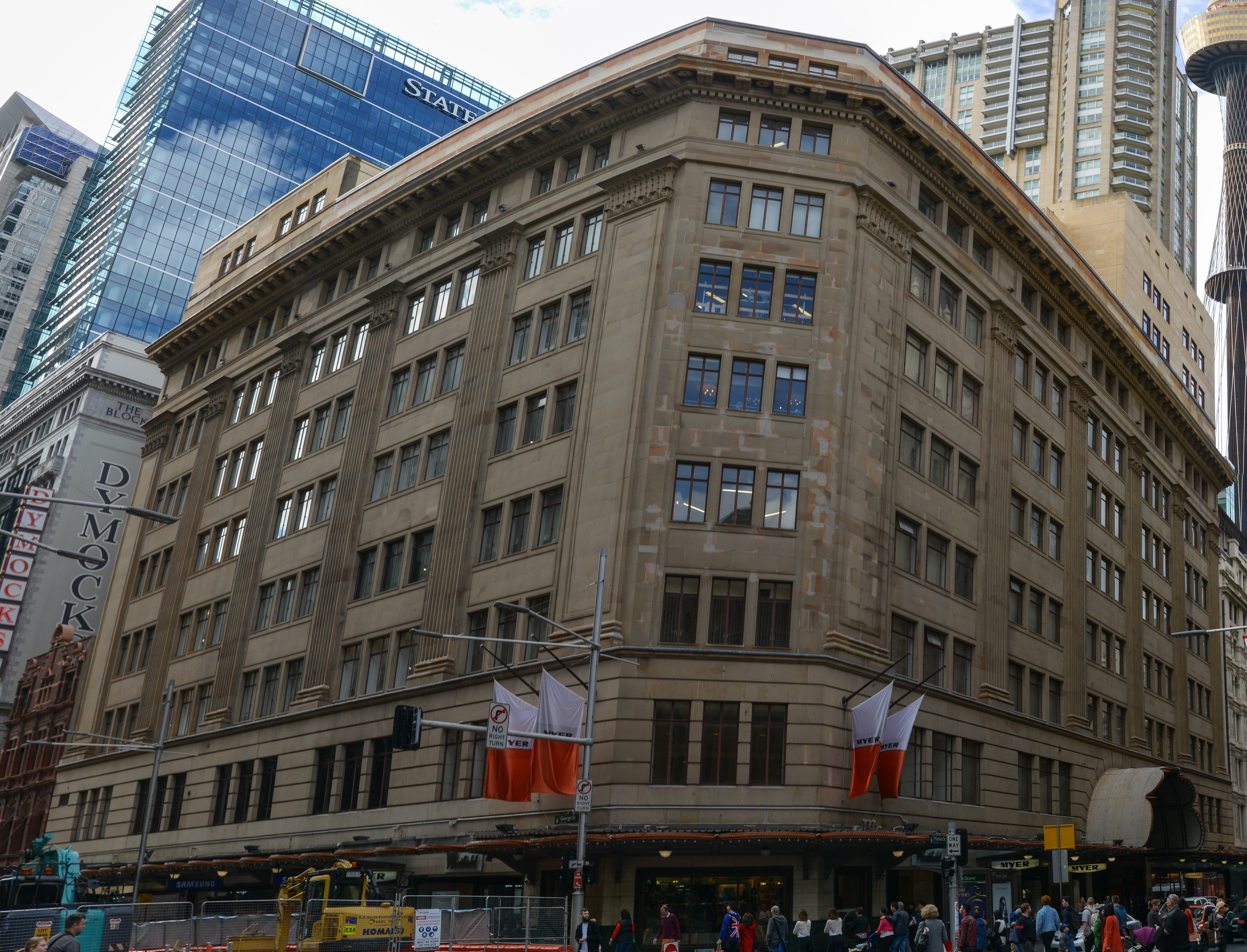
Former Farmer and Co Department Store

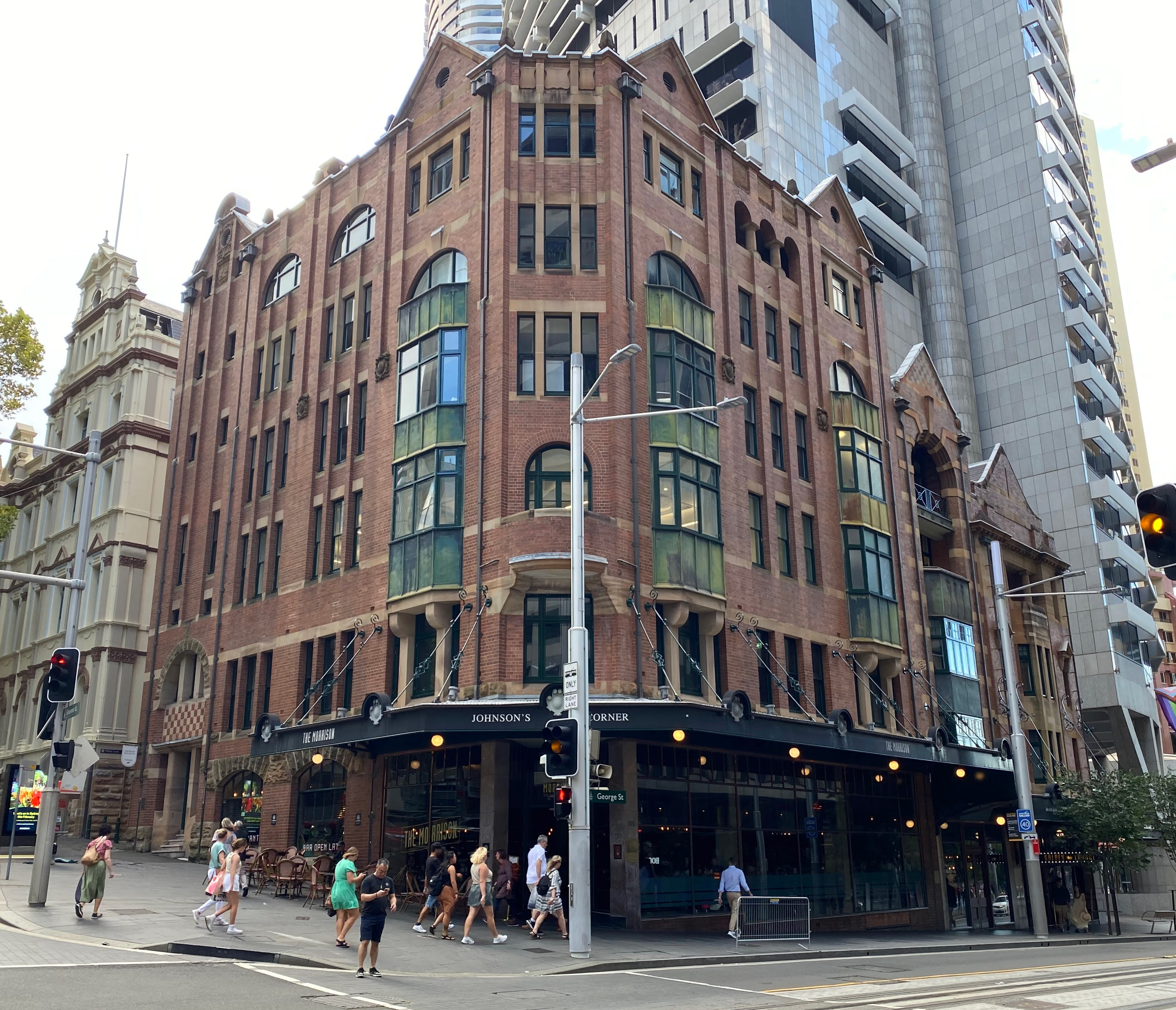
Johnsons Building

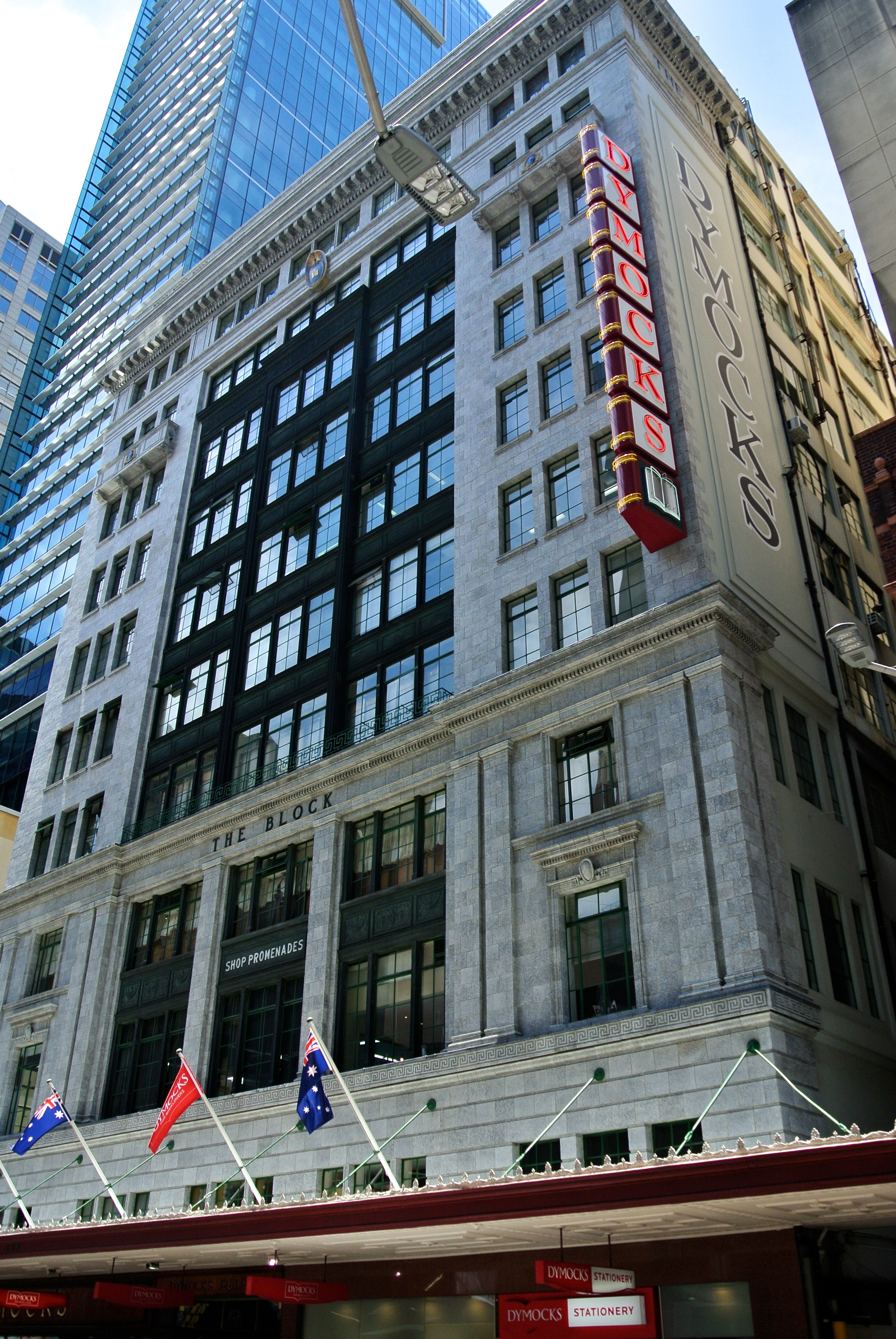
Dymocks Building

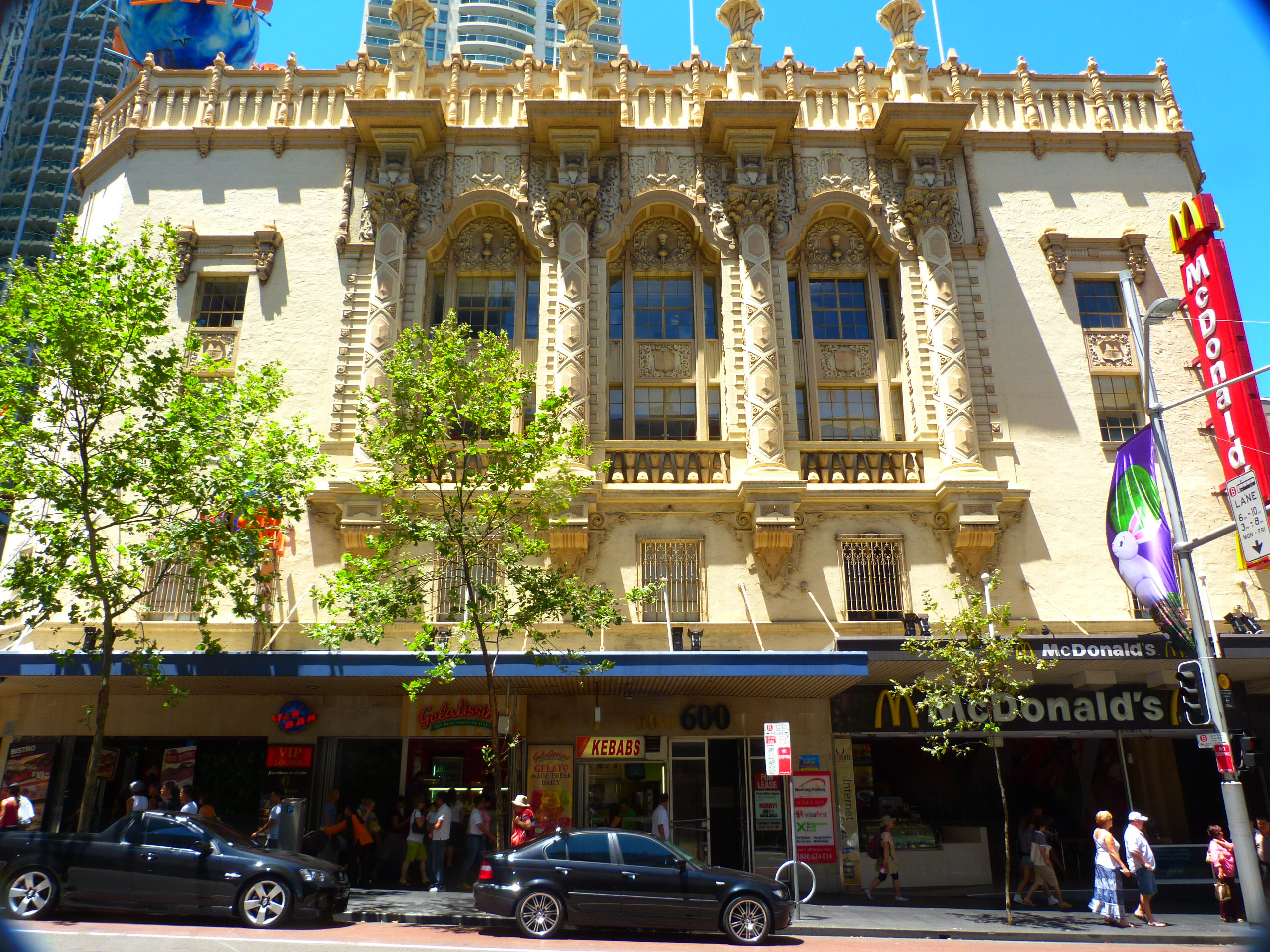
Plaza Theatre

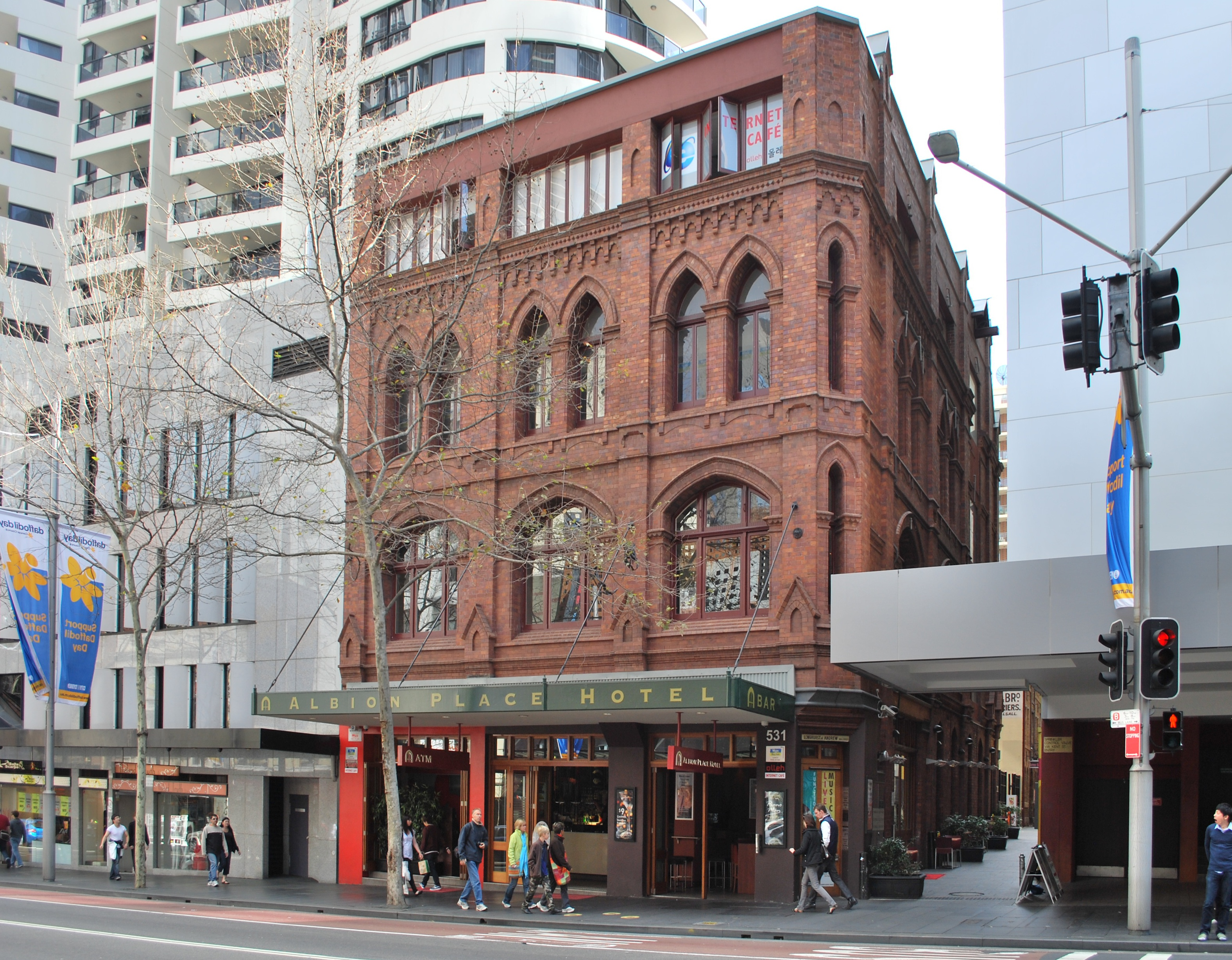
Albion Place Hotel

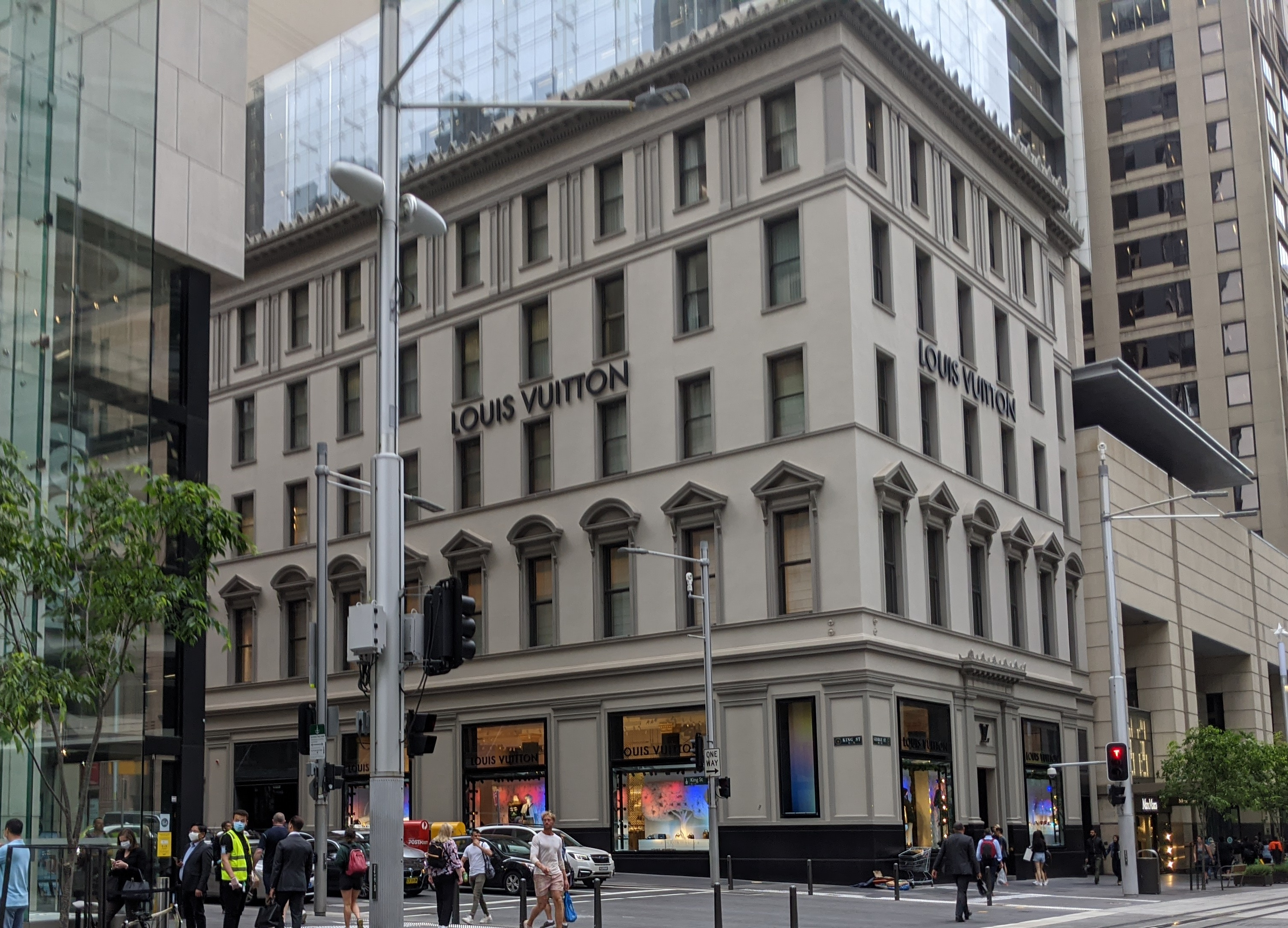
365 George Street

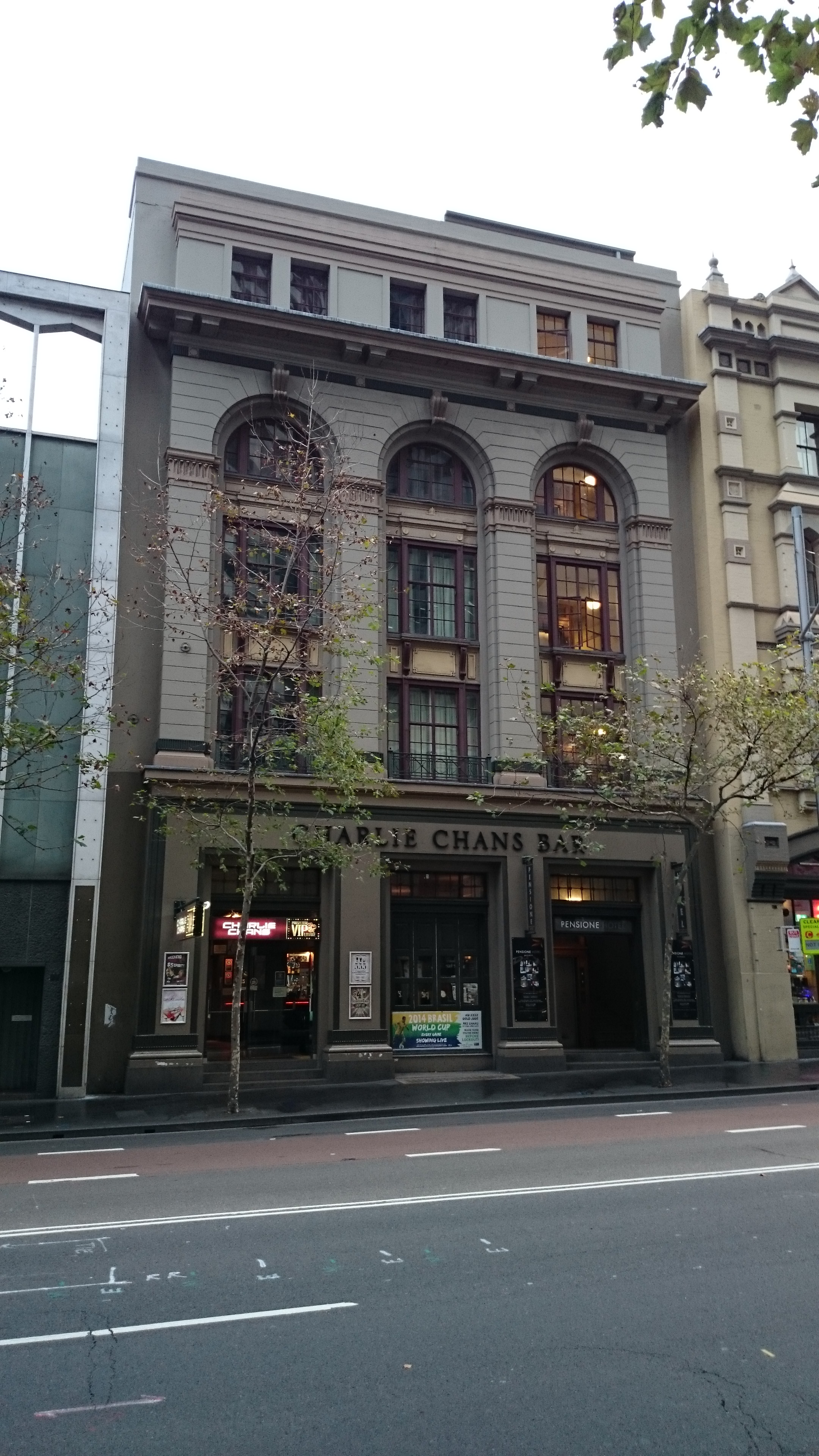
George Hotel

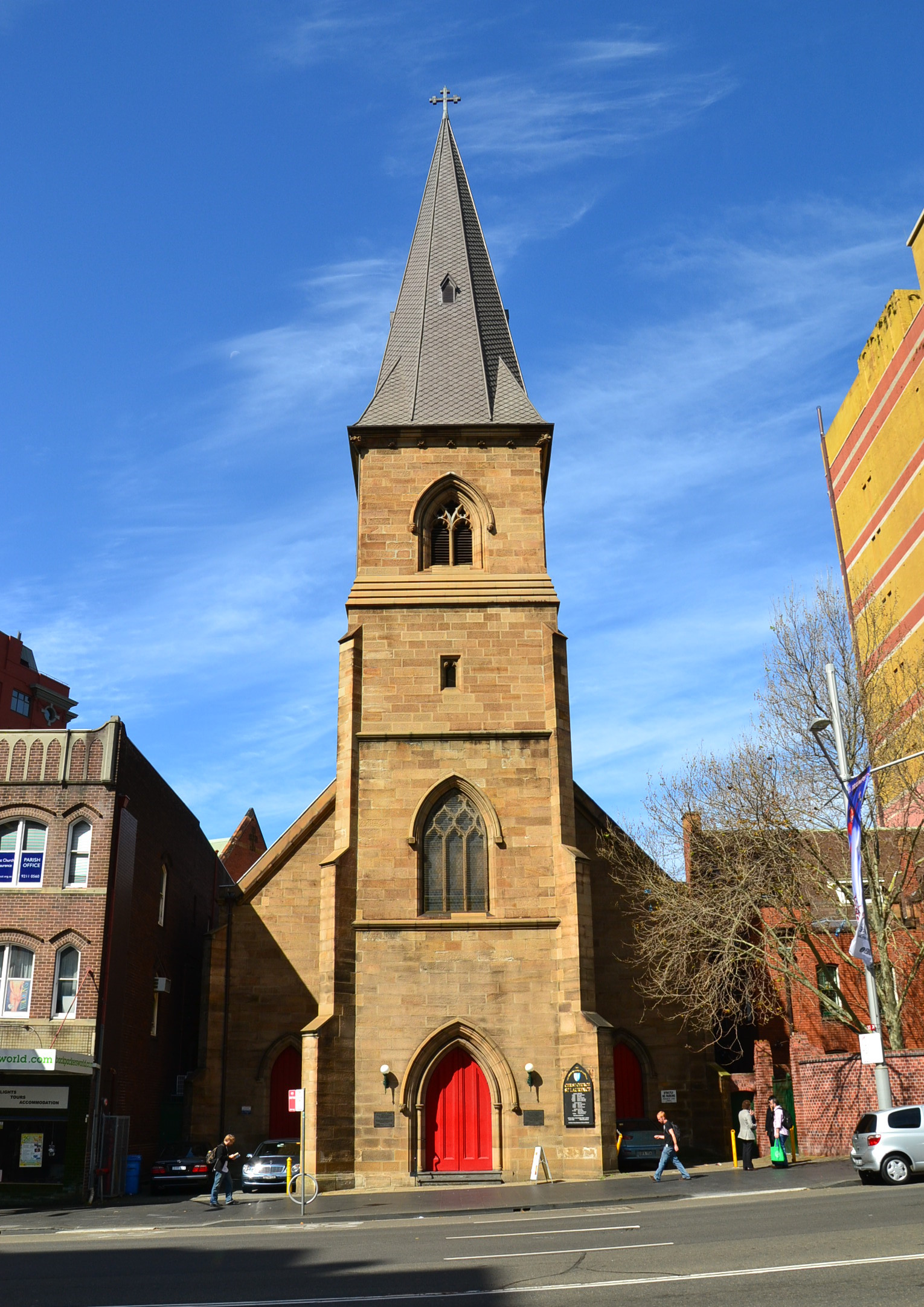
Christ Church St Laurence

== See also ==
- Geography of Sydney
- Lanes and alleyways of Sydney
