= Paspaley =

Australian pearling company (1932)

Paspaley Pearling Company
- Trade name: Paspaley
- Type: Private company
- Industry: Aquaculture; Manufacturing; Wholesale and Retailing
- Genre: Pearling
- Founded: 1932; 94 years ago
- Founder: Nicholas Paspalis
- Headquarters: Darwin, Northern Territory, Australia
- Number of locations: 7 (2019)
- Area served: Worldwide
- Key people: Nick Paspaley Jr. AC; Paspaley family
- Products: Jewellery
- Brands: Paspaley Pearls
- Total assets: A$1 billion (2012)
- Website: paspaleypearls.com

Paspaley, officially the Paspaley Pearling Company, a private company, is Australia's largest and oldest pearling company; that cultivates, farms, harvests, wholesales and retails South Sea pearls for the purposes of luxury jewellery supply and manufacture. Paspaley claims that it is a strong advocate of environmental responsibility within the pearling industry.

The Paspaley Group has a diversified portfolio of investments including a naval fleet, aircraft, a shopping mall, an office block, agricultural properties, resorts, and a vineyard. Members of the Paspaley family had an interest in Australia's largest immigration detention centre, located 35 kilometres (22 mi) south of Darwin, Northern Territory.

== Paspaley Pearls ==
According to Paspaley, its pearls are particularly known for their 'orient', which is the combination of transparent lustre and unique play of colours which is exhibited by pearls with fine quality

Paspaley operates 20 pearl farms dotted along the coastline of north-Western Australia. Paspaley claims that it maintains a ‘leave no trace’ environmental policy. In 2012, the area in which Paspaley operates was designated as a marine wilderness sanctuary. Paspaley stated that this area was still in pristine condition and is a breeding ground for humpback whales.

Paspaley Pearls appear in the collections of Tiffany & Co, Cartier, Harry Winston, Chow Tai Fook, Falconer, and more. In 1992 a single Paspaley strand of 23 pearls set a world record for cultured pearls when it was auctioned for US$2.3 million at Sotheby's, New York.

=== Retail and wholesale ===
Paspaley operate nine retail stores globally, with a strong presence in Australia – most recently in Crown – Melbourne, Australia; as well as the UAE. In addition to the retail stores, Paspaley also operates the Paspaley e-boutique.

Paspaley Pearling Company is the pearling wholesale department of the Paspaley Group of Companies. This department sells Paspaley Australian South Sea pearls to a variety of jewellery brands as well as independent retailers.

== History ==
=== Early history ===
Paspaley was established by the Paspalis family, who migrated from Kastellorizo, Greece to Australia.

The family settled in Cossack, Western Australia. At that time, the Australian north coast was the world's most important pearling area, with the towns of Broome, Western Australia, Cossack, and Darwin being the world's leading pearling ports. The Paspalis family were among the few Europeans living in the area with Aboriginal inhabitants and Asian pearl fishermen. Pearling was one of the few viable industries in the area, and Theodosis Paspalis with the help of his family, built a pearling fleet that became the basis of the family company.

Nicholas Paspaley joined the pearling trade at 14 years of age. By 1932, at the age of 19, he ran his own pearling lugger, diving for natural pearls, and for mother-of-pearl shell. When Port Hedland began to become less profitable due to exhaustion of the pearl fields, Paspaley made the decision to move to the uncharted waters of Darwin. In Darwin, Paspaley increased his pearling fleet to 5 pearling ships. It was in Darwin that Nicholas Paspalis changed the family name to Paspaley, and established the Paspaley Pearling Company.

At the outbreak of World War II, the Australian government impounded and then destroyed all pearling luggers in North Australia to keep them away from Japanese invaders.

=== Post World War II ===
After WWII the Japanese Akoya pearl industry was rebuilt in Japan, and exports of Japanese Akoya Cultured pearls boomed to international markets. Similarly, post World War II, the Australian mother-of-pearl shell industry also boomed as renewed demand ensured record prices for mother-of-pearl buttons right through to the mid-1950s.

Nicholas Paspaley had purchased four luggers which had been abandoned during the war by the Royal Australian Navy on Darwin's beaches. Once again, after rebuilding the luggers, Nicholas resumed pearling out of Darwin. However, the invention of the plastic button in the mid 1950s reduced demand for mother-of-pearl shell, virtually devastating the industry overnight, with the fleets of pearling luggers abandoned once more on the beaches.

Not to be defeated by this sudden collapse of the industry, Nicholas drew inspiration from the success of the booming Japanese Akoya cultured pearl industry, and sought to resurrect the South Sea pearl project commenced by Baron Iwasaki in 1916 – this time taking advantage of North Australia's abundant and superior beds of South Sea pearl oysters – with the dream to cultivate the world's largest and most valuable cultured pearl – the cultured South Sea pearl.

In the early 1950s Nicholas negotiated a joint venture project with the Kuribayashi family of Japan – employing the Iwasaki/Mitsubishi experts who had pioneered the project before the war. Although the Kuribayashi's had no pearl farming experience, the Kuribayashi family were the owners of the Japanese pearling fleet that travelled from Japan each year, diving for mother-of-pearl shell and pearls off the North Australian coast. Their experience in the pearling industry made them a suitable partner for the project.

The Australian Government subsequently removed the ban on pearl culture activities in Australia, and authorised the establishment of the first two pearl farms in Australia. One at Kuri Bay (named after Kuribayashi), and one at Port Essington. Initially, the Kuri Bay project was controlled by the Kuribayashi family, and the Port Essington project was controlled by Paspaley Pearling Company. Ultimately – In 1989, under the stewardship of Nick Paspaley Jnr., the two projects were merged under the Paspaley Pearling Company banner.

During the 1950s, 1960s and 1970s, the Australia pearl farms operated with virtually the same pre-WWII Iwasaki/Mitsubishi technology. Pearl production flourished and increased steadily annually. Cultured South Sea pearls became known simply as "South Sea pearls". They dominated pearl jewellery markets worldwide, and established a distinct "premier" category of cultured pearls – the "South Sea Pearl". These pearls had the effect of resurrected the existence once more of important pearl jewellery in leading jewellery houses around the world. South Sea pearl prices were hundreds of times higher than the Japanese Akoya cultured pearl prices.

Nicholas Paspaley had lived to realise his dream of creating cultured pearls of the same quality as his natural South Sea pearls – valuable "old world" pearls.

In 1982 Nicholas Paspaley was appointed Member of the Order of the British Empire for his services to the pearling industry, to business and to community service. He was also awarded a Paul Harris Fellowship for his services to the community through Rotary International. Nicholas Paspaley lived the romantic life of a true adventurer and pioneer. He dedicated his whole life to the pearling industry in the remoteness of North Australia. He died in 1984. Nicholas's wife Vivienne Lavinia Paspaley (1913–2003) worked with her husband to build the Paspaley Pearling Company and was also a significant figure in the social development of Darwin.

Nick Paspaley Jnr joined the Paspaley Pearling Company in 1969 after graduating from Sydney University as a Bachelor of Economics. Nick worked with his father eventually pioneering modern pearl cultivating techniques that enabled the realisation of his father's vision.

In 1999 Nick Paspaley Jnr was appointed Companion of the Order of Australia for his services to Australia's export industry.

Nick Paspaley Jnr was instrumental in the establishment of the South Sea Pearl Consortium – the non-profit organisation committed to promoting and protecting the reputation of the South Sea pearl. Nick is a board member of CIBJO – The World Jewelry Federation whose charter is the promotion of ethics and responsibility in the jewellery industry for the protection of consumers, and to foster confidence in the jewellery industry.

== Management and structure ==
Paspaley Pearls is a family-run and -owned business, with offices in Australia, Hong Kong, Japan, and the UAE. Paspaley operates a joint venture with its original Japanese joint venture partners. The company operates pearl retailing and wholesaling businesses. Pearl production is one business unit of the diversified Paspaley Group of Companies.

Nick Paspaley is the Chairman of the Paspaley Group of Companies. His son, James, is the Executive Director of the family-controlled group. Nick Paspaley's nephews, Peter and Michael Bracher, oversee the worldwide distribution of the company's pearls.

The following businesses operate under Paspaley Group of Companies:

- Paspaley Pearls
- Paspaley Pearling Company
- Paspaley Pearls Properties
- Aviation
- Paspaley Pastoral Group
- Bunnamagoo Wines
- Pearl Marine Engineering

== See also ==
- 354 George Street, Sydney
