= Masel Residence =

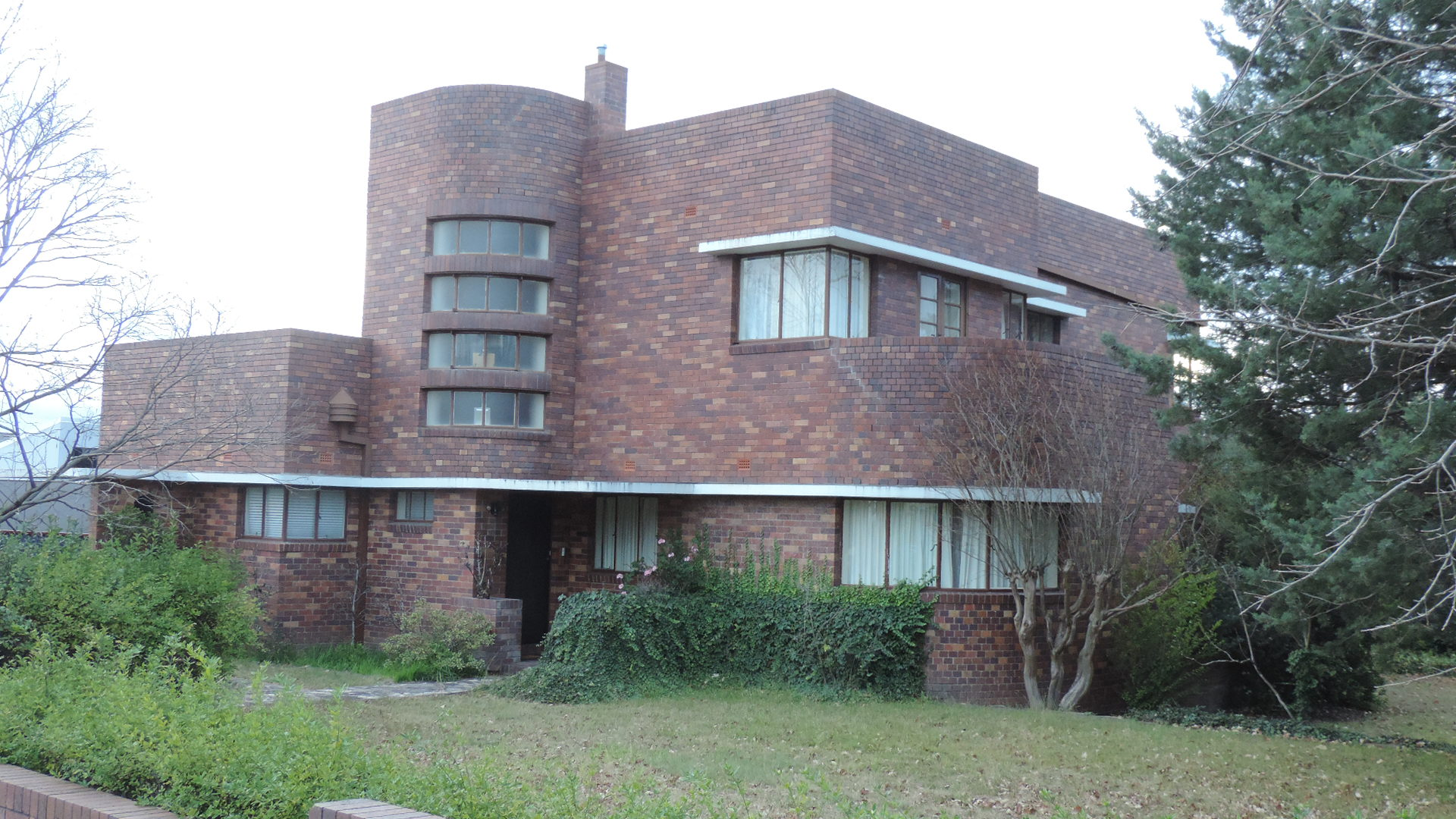
- Masel Residence, 2015

- Location within Queensland Location within Australia
- 28.6524°S 151.9384°E
- Location: 98 High Street, Stanthorpe, Southern Downs Region, Queensland, Australia

History
- Design period: 1919–1930s (interwar period)
- Built: 1937–1938
- Built for: Dr Harry and Una Masel

Site notes
- Architect: Charles William Thomas Fulton

Queensland Heritage Register
- Official name: Masel Residence (former), Diamond Residence
- Type: state heritage (built, landscape)
- Designated: 7 February 2005
- Reference no.: 601552
- Significant period: 1930s (fabric, historical)
- Significant components: pathway/walkway, trees/plantings, fence/wall – perimeter, garage, terracing, laboratory, wall/s – retaining, wall/s – garden, lawn/s, gate – entrance, wading pool, consulting rooms, furniture/fittings, garden edging/balustrades/planter boxes, driveway, residential accommodation – main house
- Builders: Kell & Rigby

Masel Residence is a heritage-listed detached house at 98 High Street, Stanthorpe, Southern Downs Region, Queensland, Australia. It was designed by Charles William Thomas Fulton and built from 1937 to 1938 by Kell & Rigby. It is also known as Diamond Residence. It was added to the Queensland Heritage Register on 7 February 2005.

== History ==
A substantial two-storeyed brick building, the former Masel Residence was erected in Stanthorpe in 1937–1938 for Dr Harry Masel and Una Masel and their family. Designed in 1936 by Charles William Thomas Fulton of Donoghue and Fulton Architects and constructed by Sydney builders Kell & Rigby, the building with its functionally zoned planning and abstract monumental facades was strongly influenced by European modernist architecture. One of the first examples of these trends in architecture in Queensland, it was the joint winner of Queensland's inaugural awards for meritorious architecture in 1938.

Settlement at Stanthorpe began around 1872 with the commencement of alluvial tin mining in the area. Originally two townships, it grew into a centre for that part of the Darling Downs. Dr Harry Masel, a general practitioner in Stanthorpe, acquired the title to a half-acre lot on High Street in 1936. Una Masel, Harry's wife, had an interest in contemporary architecture and commissioned Brisbane architect JP Donoghue to design a home for her family. The house was also to incorporate rooms for Dr Masel's general practice, including waiting area, consulting and x-ray rooms and a laboratory. It was not uncommon during the first half of the 20th century for doctors to practice from their homes. In new homes, for example at La Scala residence built in Brisbane in 1914, purpose designed facilities were sometimes incorporated. Dr Masel was particularly interested in radiology and his surgery was subsequently fitted with a large X-ray machine, more commonly found in a hospital.

JP Donoghue already had a commission in Stanthorpe that may have brought him into contact with Dr Masel. He was the architect for the main block of Stanthorpe Hospital, erected in 1936. The Masel residence was designed by Charles Fulton, then an employee of JP Donoghue. The architectural practice Donoghue and Fulton was subsequently established and the Masel Residence, completed in 1938, was one of its first commissions. Kell & Rigby, builders from Sydney who were also working in Stanthorpe on the hospital, most likely built the house.

During the 1930s the detached residence in a garden setting continued to be the most common form of housing in Australia. Houses were built in a range of styles such as Spanish Mission, Tudor Revival, Georgian Revival and various bungalow styles. A small number of houses were also built in styles inspired by European modernism. Modern architecture was the outcome of an attempt by European architects to invent new ways of building guided by rational principals of construction and associated aesthetic ideals rather than tradition. Typical features of interwar Modernist styles in Australia included parapet walls concealing low pitched or flat roofs, steel framed corner and strip windows, masonry walls devoid of decoration, rounded external corners, cantilevered concrete awnings and balconies, asymmetric composition and stairwells expressed as vertical elements contrasting with dominant horizontality. Low brick walls, hedges and extensive lawns were common in gardens.

The former Masel Residence introduced many features of this new and influential architectural vocabulary to Queensland. Unlike most Queensland houses, the Stanthorpe house was designed to suit the cold climate of the granite belt. Later buildings designed by Charles Fulton show more adaptations to the generally hot Queensland climate. The house for Dr Masel was published in national architecture journals, prior to construction in Building (1937) and after completion in Architecture (1940). Recognised as an important work of architecture at the time of its construction, the house was the winner of one of two medals awarded at the inaugural annual meritorious architecture awards of the Queensland chapter of the Royal Australian Institute of Architects in 1939. The awards were for outstanding examples of domestic architecture constructed in the previous five years. The home of Dr H Masel, Stanthorpe won the Country Division.

Charles Fulton was born in Sydney in 1906. He received his architectural training at the Sydney Technical College, was an articled pupil of FE Stowe, architect and civil engineer and subsequently worked as a draftsman for Rudder and Grout. In 1931–32 he travelled overseas working in London for B George Architects. During this period he made trips to Europe to look at buildings. He was particularly interested in the work of Dutch architect Willem Dudok, whose Hilversum Town Hall was influential in Britain and Australia in the early thirties. In 1933 he returned to Australia and settled in Brisbane where he was employed, initially by Hall and Cook and later by JP Donoghue. In 1937 he entered into partnership with JP Donoghue, an older and more established architect and became Lecturer in Charge of Architecture at the Brisbane Central Technical College. Fulton taught at the architecture school for 33 years and the Queensland University of Technology, in recognition of his contribution to architectural education, named its architecture facility the "Charles Fulton School of Architecture".

Charles Fulton was a key practitioner and teacher of modern trends in architectural design in Queensland during the late thirties and forties. The Masel residence, Nudgee Junior College at Indooroopilly (1938) and his own residence (1940) all received meritorious architecture awards in the early Royal Australian Institute of Architects Queensland Awards Programs. The practice of Donoghue and Fulton was also renowned for innovative hospital design and they were architects for the Townsville Hospital designed between 1935 and 1939 (built 1951), the Kingaroy General Hospital and Nurses' Quarters 1936–38, Goondiwindi Hospital 1939, Roma Hospital 1940, Nurses' Quarters Nambour 1941–42 (demolished 1999). After the Second World War the partnership of Donoghue and Fulton was dissolved and Fulton took a new partner JM Collin. During this period Charles Fulton designed a number of notable hospital buildings including, Barcaldine Hospital main block and Staff Quarters (1953), Clermont Hospital main block (1955), Aramac nurses quarters (1957). These later buildings were characterised by low-pitched roofs, linear planning, cross ventilation, wide eaves or awnings and the use of modern materials. The firm that he founded continues as Fulton Trotter.

The Masel family owned the house for less than 10 years. Dr Masel moved to Brisbane at the end of the Second World War to further his specialization in radiology. After moving to Brisbane they became friends with the Fultons, their neighbours in Taringa and Charles Fulton later designed another house for the Masel family at Russell Terrace, Indooroopilly. The Masels sold their Stanthorpe house to Dr DT Rushton Smith. In 1949 the property was acquired by Laurence Diamond and remains in the Diamond family.

== Description ==
Situated on the main street into Stanthorpe from the northeast, the former Masel Residence and consulting rooms is a brick and reinforced concrete building set in an established garden. Suburban houses extend along High Street to the east of the residence while institutional and commercial buildings predominate to the west. A school now adjoins the property on two sides. Other heritage buildings in High Street include the Stanthorpe Post Office, an imposing Arts and Crafts building which terminates the vista at the western end of High Street and the Central Hotel.

Solid, cubic and monumental, the house is a two-storey structure with some single-storey projections. These single storey sections include the former consulting rooms on the southern corner, a laundry and bathroom on the western corner, a garage at the rear and the eastern end of the living room, which supports a balcony above. Dominating the front facade is a centrally located curved stairwell with strip windows intersected by a continuous horizontal awning.

Exterior walls are finished in a face brick ranging in colour but predominantly red-brown. Brickwork is generally stretcher bond but incorporates header bricks where required to make sections of curved wall. English garden wall bond has been used to make the portion of parapet wall above the line of the roof and a soldier course terminates the top of the parapet. Windows are steel framed strip or corner windows. A dynamic asymmetric composition is created by the contrast between different building elements; curved corners are juxtaposed against right angles, horizontal proportions against the verticality of the staircase and carefully composed windows, emphasized by the fine horizontal planes of projecting concrete awnings, highlight the planar qualities of walls.

Low-pitched corrugated iron roofs are hidden from view behind brick parapet walls. Rainwater, collected in concealed box gutters, is discharged through the parapet walls into painted metal rainwater heads and downpipes. Metal ladders bolted to external walls provide access to the roofs.

Set behind the original low brick fence, the house faces southeast across High Street. An original metal gate in a simple geometric design opens onto a stone path that leads to the main entrance. Metal gates on the driveway match the design of the pedestrian gate but were constructed later by the Diamond family. Situated at the base of the stairwell, the main entrance opens into the residential quarters. A more modest entry further to the west, which originally provided access to the consulting rooms, has since been blocked by the construction of low brick walls. This former public entrance, now converted to a balcony, is closer to the street and is screened from the residential entry by a brick fin wall with a porthole opening. Cantilevered concrete awnings protect the entries as well as most of the doors and windows.

Located on the lower floor of the house are the former consulting rooms and the communal and utility rooms of the private residence. Bedrooms and a bathroom are located on the upper level. A double garage, with an extension used as a storeroom, is located at the rear of the house. Underground power and phone lines, the original arrangement, are connected to the house.

On entering the residence one passes under the mid-landing of a dogleg staircase with a solid timber balustrade that fills the entrance hall. A passage, which continues the entrance hall, bisects the house and leads to the rear garage. On the northeast side of the entrance hall is an L-shaped living and dining area arranged around a north-facing terrace. The living room has a brick fireplace and curved east-facing window. Steel framed French doors open from the dining and living area onto the raised terrace, which is connected to the garden by an elegant curved brick stair. The kitchen, which connects to the dining room via a pivot-hinged door, was renovated in the 1970s but retains some original cupboards. On the southwest side of the passage are a former maid's room and a small room originally designed as a bathroom but never fitted out. The laundry and a small shower and toilet are accessed externally.

A discreetly positioned door off the entrance hall connects the former consulting rooms, now used as an informal living area, with the residence. The internal walls have been removed between the waiting area, consulting and x-ray rooms. But the former laboratory remains intact.

The upper level contains three bedrooms, a nursery and a bathroom. The main bedroom, located on the eastern corner of the house, opens onto a private balcony. Positioned over the curved corner of the ground floor living room, the balcony overlooks the side garden and street. All the bedrooms have built-in wardrobes with timber veneer doors. A third level, located over the upper level bathroom and accessed via an external ladder, originally housed a header tank and hot water system.

The finish of the interior walls and ceilings is generally painted plaster but walls were originally finished with wallpaper. With the exception of wet areas, the floors are carpet over timber. The rich dark finish of the internal joinery, including timber veneered doors and timber architraves and skirtings, contrasts with the white walls. A recess in the reveals of the windows accommodates curtain tracks. A similar recess is located in the opening between the dining and living area and originally was fitted with brown velvet curtains. The original built-in heating system is no longer used but electric radiators remain in the walls of the former surgery and main bedroom. A system of electric bells located in the downstairs hallway, operates doorbells at the house and consulting room entries and connects the main bedroom to the former maids quarters. The house retains some original light fittings in the entry hall and dining room.

The planning of the house is typical of modernist designs of the period. There is an emphasis on open planning in the living and dining spaces, which flow out to the garden and occupy the most favourable orientation. Private and utility rooms are enclosed cubicles, separated from open plan areas. Corridors and vestibules are used to enhance privacy. Published plans of the house show how rooms were designed to accommodate particular furniture arrangements and indicate extensive use of built in furniture, for instance the fireplace area has a built-in sofa and bookshelves. The bookshelves remain but the sofa was never built.

The house is set in a large established garden of lawn, clipped hedges, shrubs and mature trees. Brick planter boxes associated with the terrace and entrance areas help to integrate the house into the garden. The land slopes gently towards the rear of the block. Partly terraced, it is divided by stone garden and retaining walls. The main lawn is located on the north eastern side of the house while the service yard and driveway occupy the south western part of the block. The driveway, originally gravel, is now paved. Access around the garden is via stone paths. The path to the front door has been rebuilt, using the original stones where possible. The circular path on the northern lawn was built by the current owner. Apart from the low front brick fence, the property is enclosed by a variety of non-original fences creating a secluded rear garden. The backyard originally contained a badminton court and remains of a concrete wading pool are visible near the northeast corner of the garage. Trees include a mature gum, English oak and white cedar.

== Heritage listing ==
The former Masel Residence was listed on the Queensland Heritage Register on 7 February 2005.

One of the first examples in Queensland of a house in a modernist style, the former Masel Residence is an important building in the evolution of architecture in Queensland. During the 1930s most houses in Queensland were being designed in traditional or historically derived styles. The former Masel Residence demonstrates the influence of modernist architectural ideas and practices that developed initially in Europe and became the dominant trend in architecture after World War 2. The former Masel Residence was designed in a style which although influential was not widely used and is uncommon outside of Brisbane. It is unusually intact for an interwar house, preserving in original condition both its architecture and its garden setting.

The house demonstrates, through the inclusion of a purpose-built surgery with separate entry, ways in which work and domestic environments were combined in the homes of medical practitioners during the first half of the 20th century.

The former Masel Residence uses the interwar functionalist style and incorporates typical features of the style such as asymmetrical cubic massing, expanses of undecorated brick walls, steel corner and strip windows, curved brickwork corners, flat cantilevered awnings and a concealed roof.

The aesthetic qualities of the place are heightened by contrast with the otherwise traditional character of the surrounding Queensland country town. The house in its garden setting contributes to the distinctive character of the main street into Stanthorpe.

The former Masel Residence received an inaugural award for meritorious architecture in Queensland.
