= Second Townsville General Hospital =

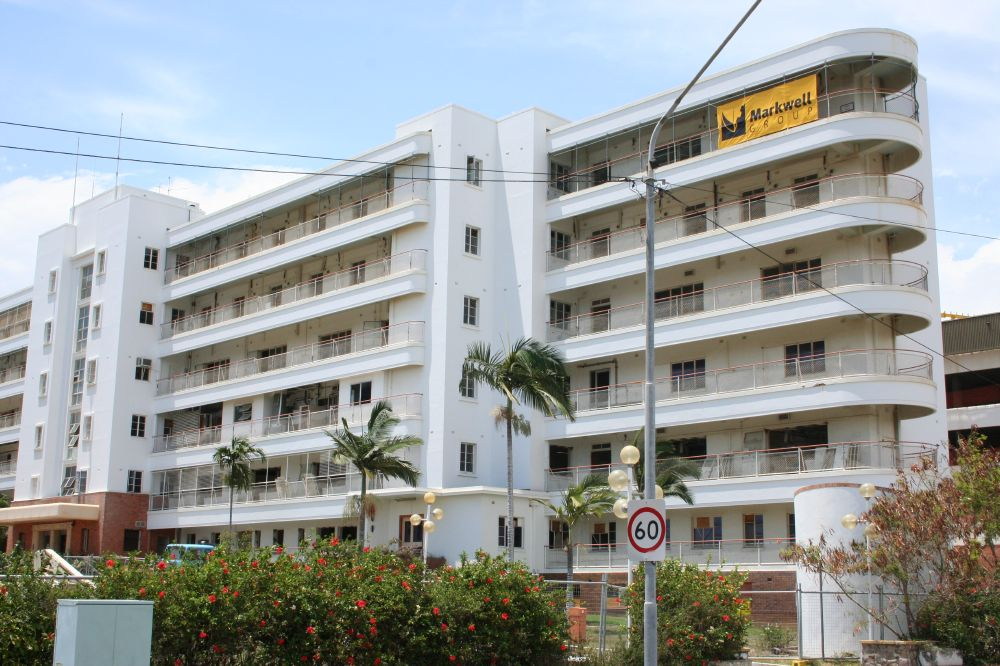
- Second Townsville General Hospital, shortly after closure, 2007

- Location within Queensland
- 19.2523°S 146.8131°E
- Location: 24 Eyre Street, North Ward, Townsville, City of Townsville, Queensland, Australia

History
- Design period: 1940s–1960s (post-World War II)
- Built: 1945–1951

Site notes
- Architect: Donoghue & Fulton
- Architectural style: Modernism

Queensland Heritage Register
- Official name: Townsville General Hospital, North Ward Hospital
- Type: state heritage (built)
- Designated: 26 April 1996
- Reference no.: 601388
- Significant period: 1945–1951 (fabric); 1930s–1950s (historical)

The Second Townsville General Hospital is a heritage-listed former hospital and now an apartment building at 24 Eyre Street, North Ward, Townsville, City of Townsville, Queensland, Australia. It was designed by Donoghue & Fulton and built from 1945 to 1951. It is also known as North Ward Hospital. It was added to the Queensland Heritage Register on 26 April 1996.

== History ==
The first hospital in Townsville was opened in a cottage on The Strand in 1866 and was known as the Burdekin and Flinders Districts Hospital. In 1881 it was relocated to the present site on Stanton Hill. A two storied building was completed in 1882 and numerous buildings were subsequently built on the site.

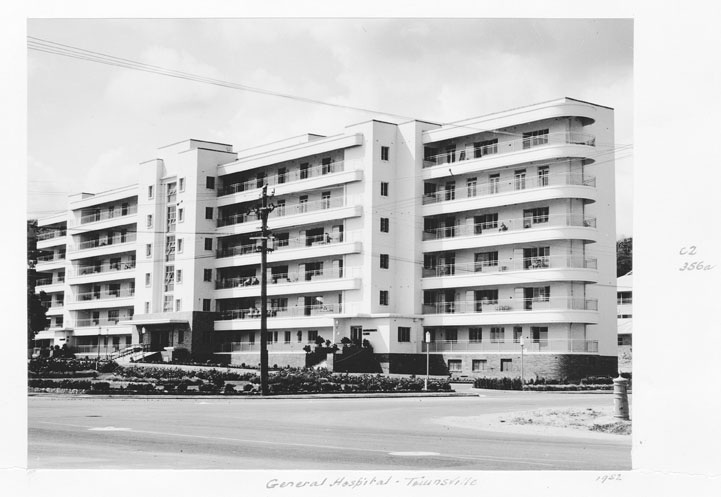
Second Townsville General Hospital, circa 1952

The Second Townsville General Hospital was designed by Donoghue and Fulton between 1935 and 1939 but construction was delayed due to the outbreak of World War II. On 11 November 1945, the foundation stone was laid by the Queensland Treasurer, Ned Hanlon. On 21 April 1951 he officially opened the hospital in his role as Queensland Premier. The new hospital was to be the largest facility of its type in Australia outside a capital city and had been built at a cost of approximately £500,000 for building and equipment. It opened with approximately 270 beds. Dr Kiernan Dorney was the medical superintendent and the hospital claimed to have the largest staff of specialists outside Brisbane.

Between 1932 and 1945 was a period of rapid development in hospitals in Queensland. This was partly due to the passing of the Hospital Act in 1923 which laid the foundations for the Queensland Government to resume responsibility for financing and administrating public hospitals which had previously been run by voluntary committees. Under the Act the state was divided into regions and regions into districts. Each region was controlled from a base hospital which coordinated other hospitals in the region. Hospital boards, dominated by government representatives and excluding members of the medical profession, were created to oversee the administration of the hospitals. The Queensland Government was to provide 60% of the running costs while the remainder was to be met by local government. The boards had the power under the act to appoint their own architects. Ned Hanlon, who was minister for Health and Home Affairs from 1935 until 1944 and premier from 1946 until 1952, was responsible for many of the projects undertaken at this time. The Free Hospital Scheme was introduced to Queensland in 1946.

Tenders were called in 1947 for new nurses quarters at Townsville designed by JP Donoghue, Cusick and Edwards. By 1964 the hospital complex also included a maternity hospital, a thoracic block, isolation and psychiatric annexes, a dental clinic, an Institute of Tropical Medicine (established in 1910 and the first medical research organisation in Australia) and a Commonwealth Serum Laboratory.

Other hospital works designed by Donoghue and Fulton include general hospitals at Kingaroy (1936–38), Ayr (1941) and Roma, the Nurses' Quarters at Nambour Hospital (1937–38) and maternity hospitals at Goondiwindi, Rockhampton, Warwick and Nambour. Later works include the Barcaldine General Hospital by Fulton and Collins built in 1957 and the Thoracic Block at the Toowoomba Hospital by Donoghue, Cusick and Edwards in 1958.

The Second Townsville General Hospital demonstrates the emergence of the Australia-wide trend for a progressive image, inspired by European modernist architecture, for highrise hospital design. The high rise plan, in which various functions could be concentrated in vertically stacked spaces, replaced the earlier pavilion planning principles, in which detached buildings containing single wards were widely separated. Developments in medical theory meant that ventilation and isolation were no longer considered as important to the health of the patient. New priorities based on more efficient use of space, staff, circulation between different parts of the hospital and reduced heating costs led to the popularity of the much more compact highrise type of hospital. Block 3 at the Brisbane General Hospital, designed in 1930, was the first hospital building in Queensland to fully incorporate the principles of the highrise plan. It was designed in the Spanish Mission style to coordinate with the earlier Blocks 1 and 2. The design for the Second Townsville General Hospital was probably the first in Queensland to combine highrise planning principles with a progressive modern image.

First introduced into Australia in the 1930s the highrise plan soon dominated new hospital construction. Melbourne architects Stephensen and Meldrum, later Stephensen and Turner, and Leighton Irwin were noted specialists in this increasingly complex field of architectural design. The development of modernist architecture in Australia is often associated with hospitals designed by these firms in the 1930s and 1940s.

Charles Fulton is recognised as a key practitioner to have designed in the modern style in Queensland before the Second World War. Fulton was born in Sydney in 1906 and undertook his architectural training there. He worked in London for B George, Architects in 1931 and 1932. In 1933 he was employed by Hall and Cook in Brisbane and he established his practice with Donoghue in 1937. Fulton received acknowledgment for his skilled execution of this style for the Masel residence at Stanthorpe through a meritorious architecture award in the first Queensland awards programme in 1938 and again in 1940 for his own residence at Indooroopilly. In 1937 Fulton was appointed Lecturer in Charge of Architecture at the Central Technical College.

Eventually the Second Townsville General Hospital could not expand any further due to its urban location and was regularly reaching absolute capacity. The third and current Townsville Hospital at Douglas began construction in 1998 and opened in 2001, co-located with James Cook University. However the heritage-listed buildings of the second hospital, with their landmark white Art Deco appearance, enviable location, and water views, have been retained and were turned into exclusive apartments.

== Description ==
The Second Townsville General Hospital is a six-storied concrete and brick building with a flat roof concealed behind parapet walls. It is situated near the northern corner of the hospital reserve and overlooks Cleveland Bay and Magnetic Island. The external walls, which are rendered and painted white, sit on a base of exposed brickwork. The building has a narrow plan with the long north eastern elevation forming the dominant front facade.

This symmetrical facade is divided into five distinct bays where the building steps back from the centre to the edges. The central bay is a tower-like structure which provides the main entrance on the ground level. The entrance is further emphasised through the use of exposed brickwork and a cantilevered awning. Steel framed windows form a vertical strip in the centre of the entrance tower above the awning.

On the flanking bays each level is expressed through projecting balconies which run along the north eastern elevation. The balconies have light weight metal balustrades. At the edge of the balconies, underneath the balustrades, are deep horizontal bands or valances which provide sunshading for the windows below.

Built in a modernist style the surfaces of the building are undecorated. The composition of the building contrasts horizontal with vertical elements, and sheer surfaces with carefully controlled openings and deep shadowed recesses. The vertically proportioned elements are the central entrance tower and stepped corners. The wards, with long open balconies curved and cantilevered at the ends, form the horizontals.

== Heritage listing ==
The Second Townsville General Hospital was listed on the Queensland Heritage Register on 26 April 1996 having satisfied the following criteria.

The place is important in demonstrating the evolution or pattern of Queensland's history.

The hospital is one of the most prominent examples of the extensive hospital building program undertaken by Labour Governments in the 1930s and 1940s throughout Queensland as part of its commitment to government sponsored public health.

The first hospital in Townsville was opened in a cottage on the Strand in 1866 and was known as the Burdekin and Flinders Districts Hospital. In 1881 it was relocated to the present site on Stanton Hill. A two storied building was completed in 1882 and numerous buildings were subsequently built on the site.

The place is important in demonstrating the principal characteristics of a particular class of cultural places.

The Second Townsville General Hospital, designed in the late 1930s, is significant as an early example in Queensland of a highrise hospital influenced by European modernist architecture. This style of architecture developed in the 1930s and 1940s in Australia, with new hospitals providing many of the most prominent examples. Through its simple geometry of horizontal and vertical elements, wide cantilevered balconies with rounded corners, flat roof concealed behind parapets and its plain surfaces, Townsville General Hospital is a good example of a hospital built in this idiom.

The place has a special association with the life or work of a particular person, group or organisation of importance in Queensland's history.

The Second Townsville General Hospital is significant as an institutional building designed by the important architectural firm Donoghue and Fulton which combined the latest ideas in hospital planning with recent developments in architectural design. Charles Fulton, who designed the building, was a key practitioner and teacher of the modern trends in architectural design in Queensland. Fulton was acknowledged for his work in this style. Both the Masel residence at Stanthorpe (1938) and his own residence in Indooroopilly (1940), received a meritorious architecture award in the early Queensland Awards Programmes.
