= Charles William Thomas Fulton =

Australian architect

Charles William Thomas Fulton (1906–1988) was an Australian architect practising in Brisbane, Queensland. A number of his works are listed on the Queensland Heritage Register.

== Early life ==
Charles Fulton was born in Sydney in 1906 and received his architectural training as an articled pupil of FE Stowe, architect and civil engineer. In 1931–32 he worked in London as a draftsman for Rudder and Grout and then B George Architects. During this period he travelled in Europe and made pilgrimages looking at buildings. He was particularly interested in the work of Dutch architect Willem Dudok, whose Hilversum Town Hall was influential in Britain in the early thirties.

== Career ==
In 1933 Charles Fulton returned to Australia and settled in Brisbane where he was employed by Hall and Cook. In 1937 he entered into partnership with John Patrick Donoghue. In the same year he also became lecturer in charge of Architecture at the Brisbane Central Technical College and he taught in the architecture school for 33 years. He made a large contribution to architectural education throughout his whole career and the Queensland University of Technology named its architecture facility the "Charles Fulton School of Architecture" in his honour.

Charles Fulton was a key practitioner and teacher of the modern trends in architectural design in Queensland during the late thirties and forties. The Masel Residence at Stanthorpe (1938), Nudgee Junior College Indooroopilly (1938) and his own residence all received meritorious architecture awards in the early Royal Australian Institute of Architects Queensland Awards Programs. Aside from their domestic work the practice of Donoghue and Fulton was renowned as hospital architects who combined the latest ideas in hospital planning with recent developments in architectural design. The Townsville General Hospital designed between 1935 and 39 (built 1951), the Kingaroy General Hospital and Nurses' Quarters (1936–38), Goondiwindi Hospital 1939, Roma Hospital 1940, Nurses' Quarters Nambour 1941–42 (demolished 1999) were all buildings designed in this period.

After the Second World War the partnership of Donoghue and Fulton was dissolved and Fulton took a new partner James Musgrave Collin. During this period Charles Fulton designed a number of notable hospital buildings including, Barcaldine Hospital main block and Staff Quarters (1953), Clermont Hospital main block (1955), Aramac nurses quarters (1957). All these later buildings were characterised by low pitched roofs, linear planning, cross ventilation, wide eaves or awnings and the use of modern materials. The firm that he founded continues as Fulton Trotter.

== Later life ==
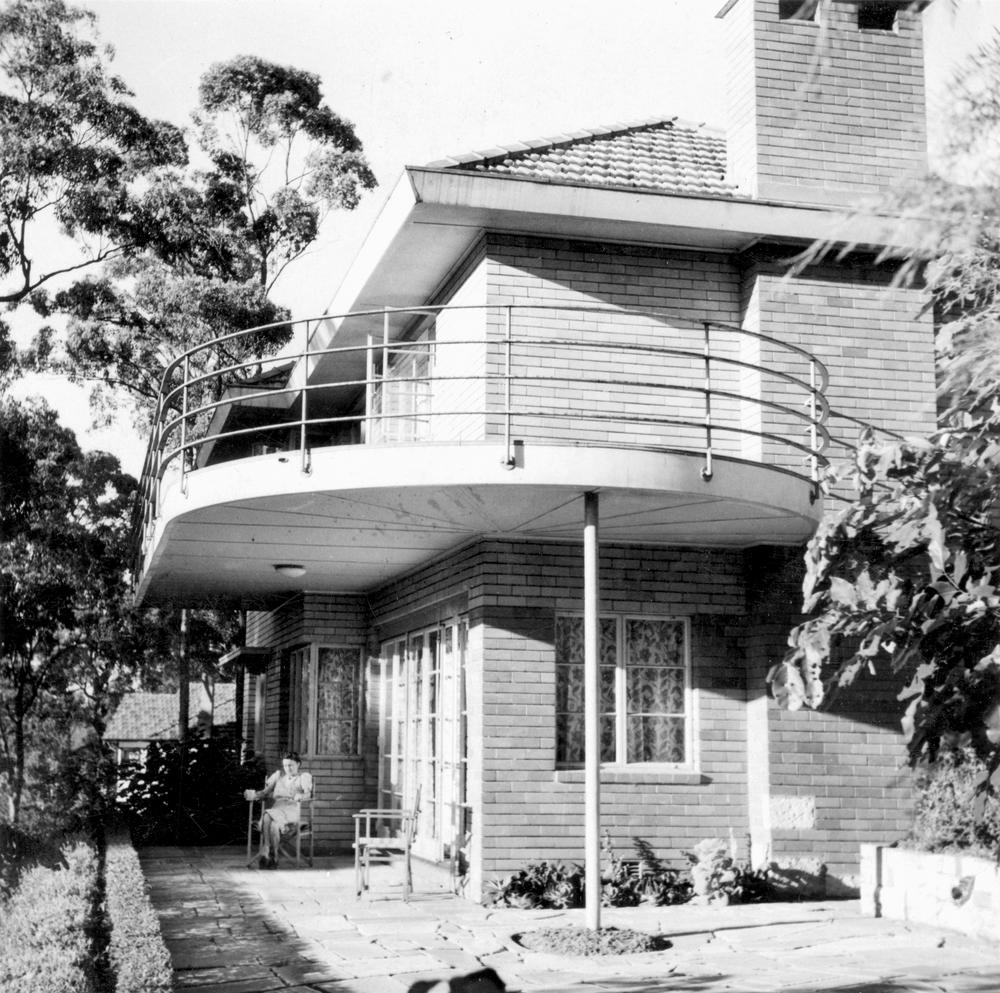
Charles Fulton's residence, 1944

The Fulton family occupied the Fulton Residence for nearly 60 years with Charles Fulton dying in 1988 and his wife Violet Edna Fulton in 1999. Both Mr and Mrs Fulton were very attached to the house and garden and it remained virtually unaltered from when it was completed in 1940.
