= Fulton Residence =

Residence, Taringa

Fulton residence, Taringa
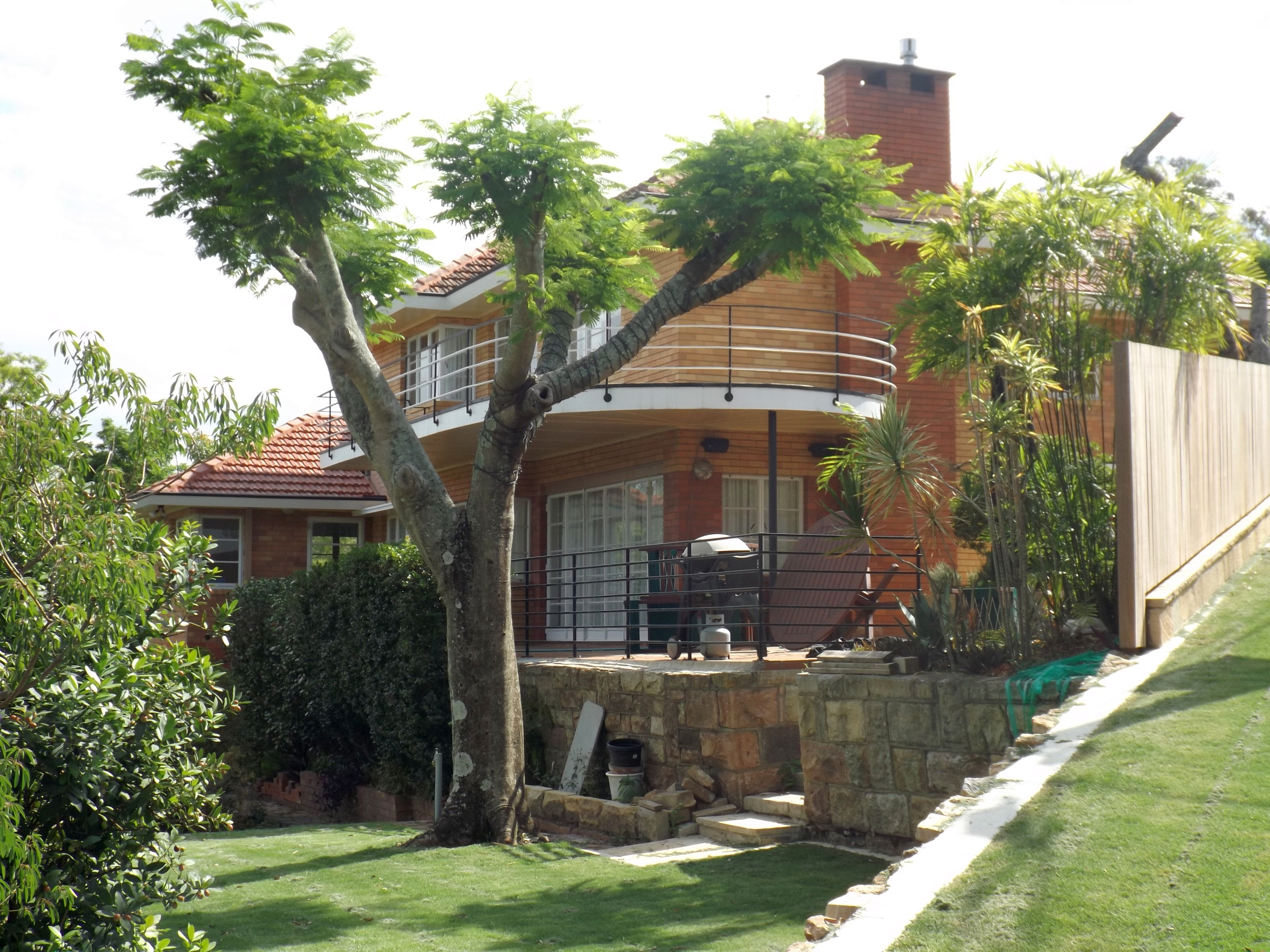
- 2014

- Location within Queensland Location within Australia
- 27.5011°S 152.991°E
- Location: 209 Indooroopilly Road, Taringa, City of Brisbane, Queensland, Australia

History
- Design period: 1939–1945 (World War II)
- Built: 1940

Site notes
- Architect: Charles William Thomas Fulton
- Architectural style: Modernism

Queensland Heritage Register
- Official name: Fulton Residence
- Type: state heritage (landscape, built)
- Designated: 27 October 2000
- Reference no.: 602208
- Significant period: 1940 (fabric, historical)
- Significant components: residential accommodation – main house, wall/s, terracing, garden/grounds

The Fulton Residence is a heritage-listed detached house at 209 Indooroopilly Road, Taringa, City of Brisbane, Queensland, Australia. It was designed by Charles William Thomas Fulton for his own use and was built in 1940. It was added to the Queensland Heritage Register on 27 October 2000.

== History ==
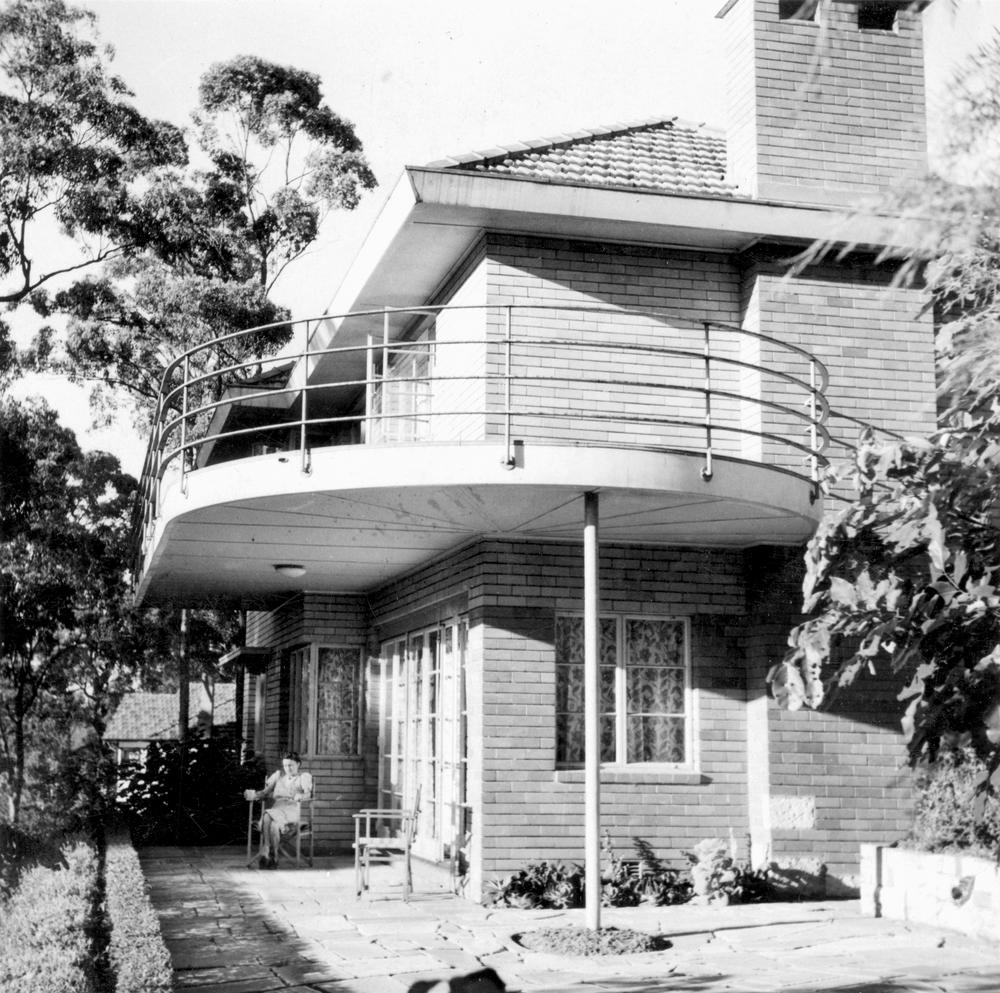
Charles Fulton's residence, 1944

The Fulton Residence was designed in 1940 by Charles Fulton as his own home. The house was designed in a modified international style and won the 1948 Queensland Royal Australian Institute of Architects award for meritorious architecture.

Charles Fulton choose to build his home at a time when the inner western suburbs of St Lucia and Taringa were being opened up for development. This development was stimulated by the move of the University of Queensland to St Lucia. Architects were particularly attracted to these suburbs because of the topography and vegetation and the area developed a reputation for innovative and experimental domestic design. In the post-war period a number of architects settled in the St Lucia area, including of Karl Langer, Edwin James Hayes, Campbell Royston Scott and Vitaly Gzell.

Charles Fulton was born in Sydney in 1906 and received his architectural training as an articled pupil of Francis Ernest Stowe, architect and civil engineer. In 1931–1932 he worked in London as a draftsman for Rudder and Grout and then B George Architects. During this period he travelled in Europe and made pilgrimages looking at buildings. He was particularly interested in the work of Dutch architect Willem Dudok, whose Hilverusm Town Hall was influential in Britain in the early thirties. In 1933 he returned to Australia and settled in Brisbane where he was employed by Hall and Cook. In 1937 he entered into a partnership with John Patrick Donoghue. In the same year, he also became a lecturer in charge of Architecture at the Brisbane Central Technical College and he taught in the architecture school for 33 years. He made a large contribution to architectural education throughout his whole career and the Queensland University of Technology named its architecture facility the "Charles Fulton School of Architecture" in his honour.

Charles Fulton was a key practitioner and teacher of the modern trends in architectural design in Queensland during the late thirties and forties. The Masel Residence at Stanthorpe (1938), Nudgee Junior College Indooroopilly (1938) and his own residence all received meritorious architecture awards in the early Royal Australian Institute of Architects Queensland Awards Programs. Aside from their domestic work, the practice of Donoghue and Fulton was renowned as hospital architects who combined the latest ideas in hospital planning with recent developments in architectural design. The Townsville General Hospital designed between 1935–39 (built 1951), the Kingaroy General Hospital and Nurses' Quarters (1936–38), Goondiwindi Hospital 1939, Roma Hospital 1940, Nurses' Quarters Nambour 1941–42 (demolished 1999) were all buildings designed in this period.

After the Second World War the partnership of Donoghue and Fulton was dissolved and Fulton took a new partner James Musgrave Collin. During this period Charles Fulton designed a number of notable hospital buildings including, Barcaldine Hospital main block and Staff Quarters (1953), Clermont Hospital main block (1955), Aramac nurses quarters (1957). All these later buildings were characterised by low pitched roofs, linear planning, cross ventilation, wide eaves or awnings and the use of modern materials. The firm that he founded continues as Fulton Trotter.

The Fulton family occupied the Fulton Residence for nearly 60 years with Charles Fulton dying in 1988 and his wife Violet Edna Fulton in 1999. Both Mr and Mrs Fulton were very attached to the house and garden and it remained virtually unaltered from when it was completed in 1940.

== Description ==
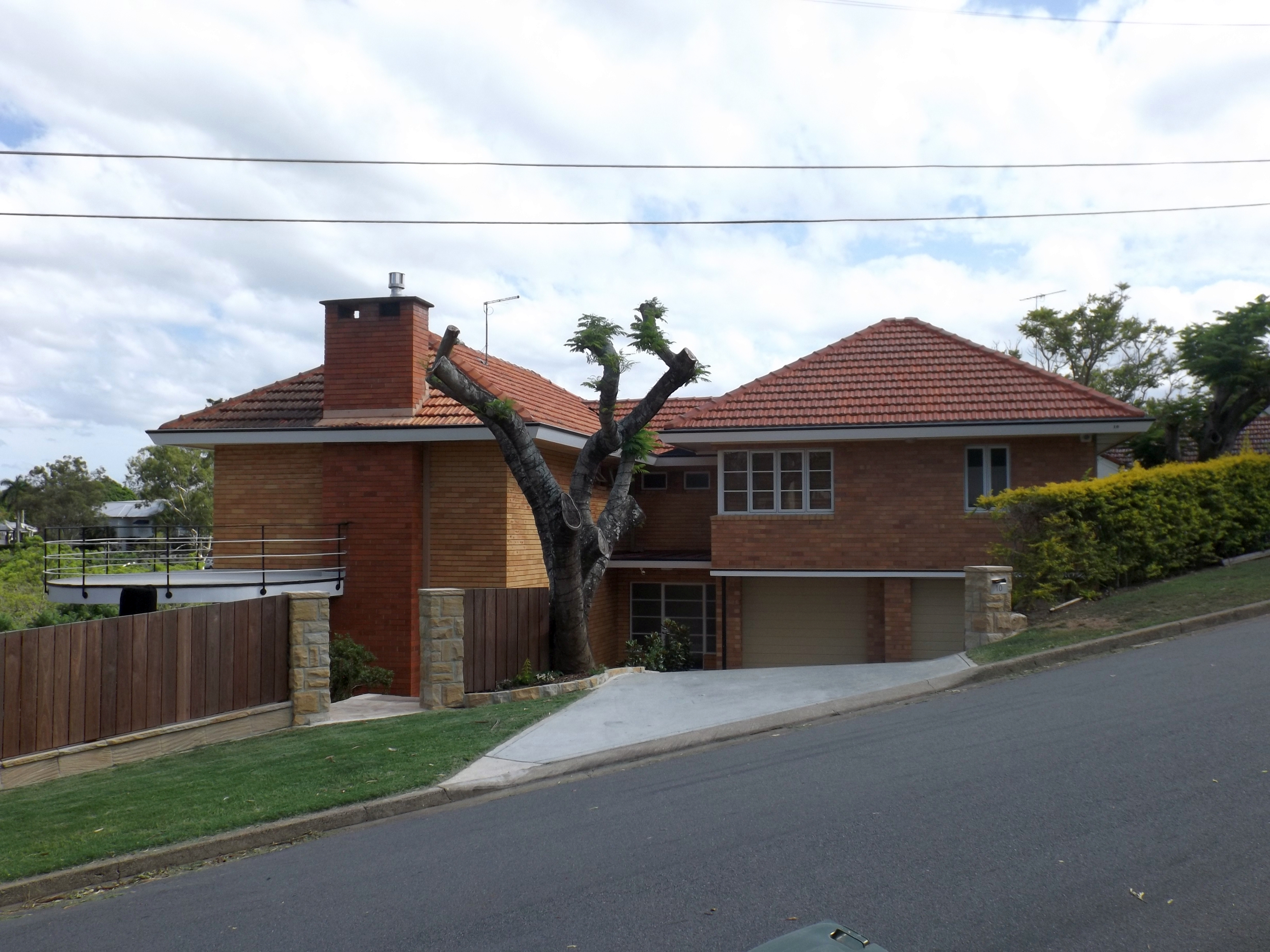
Driveway in McCaul Street, 2014

The Fulton House is a modified example of the International style in the materials, detailing and asymmetrical massing. It is a two-storey buff-coloured brick house with contrasting red brick to the lower levels and a terra cotta tiled roof. A large box gutter is concealed behind a deep fascia board and this combined with the horizontal raked joints and the concrete balcony and steel balustrade serves to emphasise the horizontal lines. The chimney is built in a red brick emphasising the vertical line.

Internally the house is designed on three levels with an entrance stair hall leading down to an open planned living dining room opening onto a small kitchen. The open stairwell leads to the upper level which contains two bedrooms, a study and a bathroom The main bedroom and study open onto the balcony. Internally the house is without decoration and is flooded with light from the large windows. The house is very intact and has many of the original light fittings and "modern" features such as built-in cupboards in the kitchen and bedrooms. Bookshelves in the living room and bed head units in the bedrooms were designed and built by Charles Fulton.

The house is set back on the site overlooking Indooroopilly Road with a large mature garden in front of the house. The garden has a stone flagged terrace, stone retaining walls and stepped garden terraces all of which were constructed by Charles Fulton and his family.

== Heritage listing ==
Fulton Residence was listed on the Queensland Heritage Register on 27 October 2000 having satisfied the following criteria.

The place is important in demonstrating the evolution or pattern of Queensland's history.

The house demonstrates how, in the interwar period, European architectural ideas were transferred to Australia and modified to local conditions. The Fulton Residence is an important building in the evolution of domestic architecture in Queensland. In the immediate post war period the western Brisbane suburbs of St Lucia, Taringa and Indooroopilly were the location of many experiments with modern domestic architecture and the Fulton Residence is part of this tradition.

The place is important in demonstrating the principal characteristics of a particular class of cultural places.

The Fulton Residence is an excellent intact Queensland example of the international style of architecture, with its use of modern materials, and the asymmetrical balance of horizontal and vertical elements.

The place is important because of its aesthetic significance.

The design of the building with its interplay of horizontal and vertical elements and curved balcony has aesthetic value. Sited on a slope the house is enhanced by a large mature garden which contributes to the ambience of the surrounding suburb.

The place has a special association with the life or work of a particular person, group or organisation of importance in Queensland's history.

The Fulton Residence is intimately associated with the architect Charles Fulton as the house he designed for his family. It displays many of the characteristics of his work including the use of face brickwork, the use of modern materials such as steel windows and stainless, corner windows, the eschewing of internal decoration and an interest in designing for a sub tropical climate.

Charles Fulton is an important figure in the development of architecture in Queensland both as an educator and a practitioner. He played an important role at the Brisbane Central Technical College (now the Queensland University of Technology) for over thirty years. He was one of the main architects responsible for introducing the international style to Queensland. He experimented with this style combining it with an interest in climatic design. Aside from his own home his key buildings include the Masel residence at Stanthorpe, Nudgee Junior College Indooroopilly, Kingaroy General Hospital, Barcaldine Hospital and Townsville Hospital.
