= Pilot Officer Geoffrey Lloyd Wells Memorial Seat =

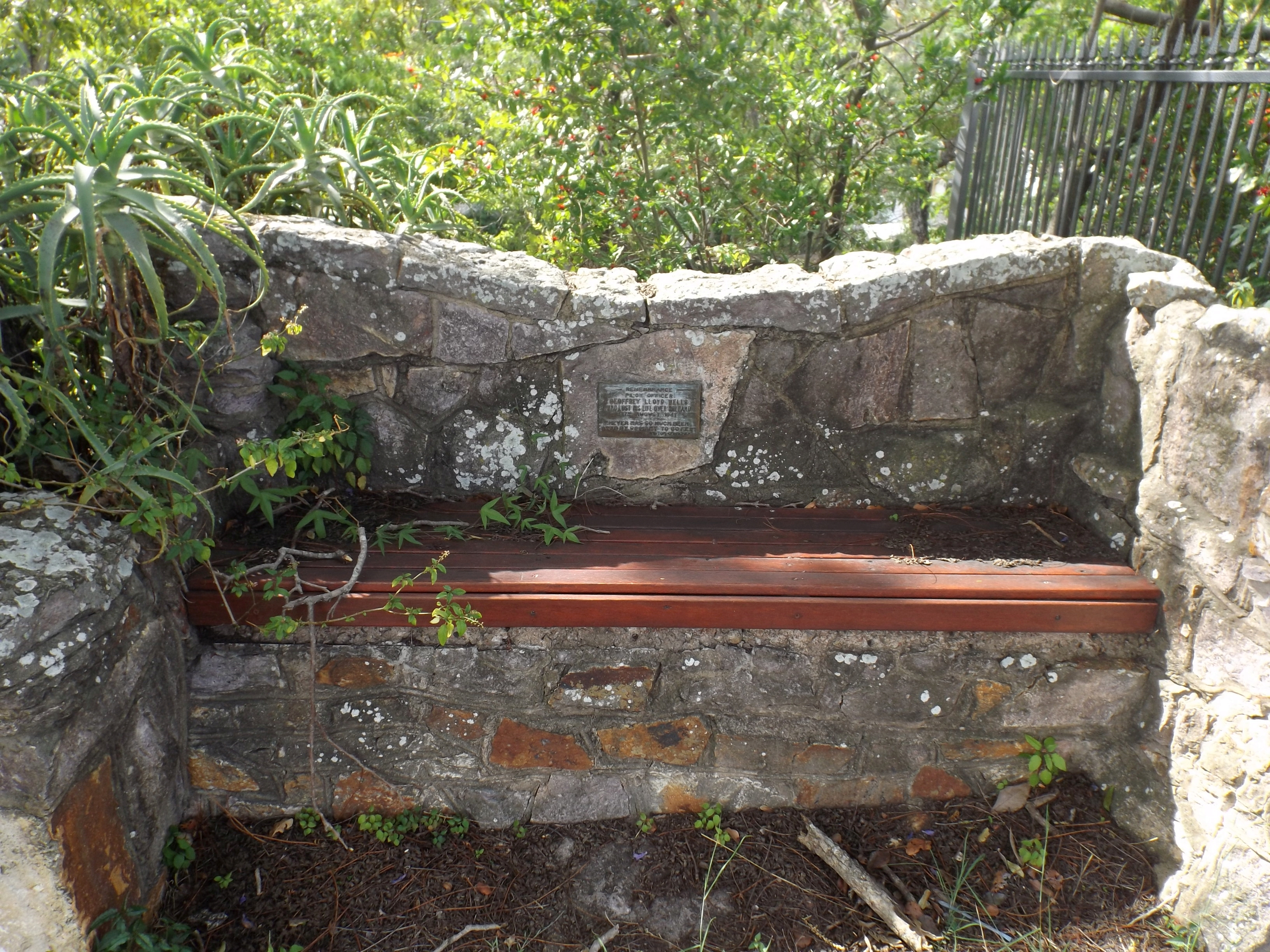
- The seat in 2014

- Location within Queensland Location within Australia
- 27.4892°S 152.9803°E
- Location: 103 Stanley Terrace, Taringa, City of Brisbane, Queensland, Australia

History
- Design period: 1940s–1960s (post-World War II)
- Built: post August 1941

Site notes
- Architect: Wells Family

Queensland Heritage Register
- Official name: Pilot Officer Geoffrey Lloyd Wells Memorial Seat
- Type: state heritage (built)
- Designated: 21 October 1992
- Reference no.: 600338
- Significant period: Post-World War II recovery (1940s–1960s) (historical, fabric)
- Significant components: seating
- Builders: Wells Family

Pilot Officer Geoffrey Lloyd Wells Memorial Seat is a heritage-listed memorial at 103 Stanley Terrace, Taringa, City of Brisbane, Queensland, Australia. It was designed by the Wells Family in honour of their son Pilot Officer Geoffrey Lloyd Wells. It was built some time after August 1941 by Wells Family. It was added to the Queensland Heritage Register on 21 October 1992.

== History ==
Geoffrey Lloyd Wells was born on 26 June 1915 at Wallingford, Taringa, the son of Henry Charles Wells and his wife Elsie Irene (née Lloyd).

During World War II he enlisted in Brisbane in the Royal Australian Air Force. Pilot Officer Geoffrey Lloyd Wells was shot down over in a Wellington X9700 over Roggel, the Netherlands on 17 August 1941 during active service. He was buried in the Jonkerbos War Cemetery near the town of Nijmegen located in a woodland area known as Jonkers Bosch.

This stone seat, which is set into a stone fence along Stanley Terrace, was constructed by his family as a memorial to him. The seat was erected by his family in the corner of their property, as a memorial and for public use.

== Description ==
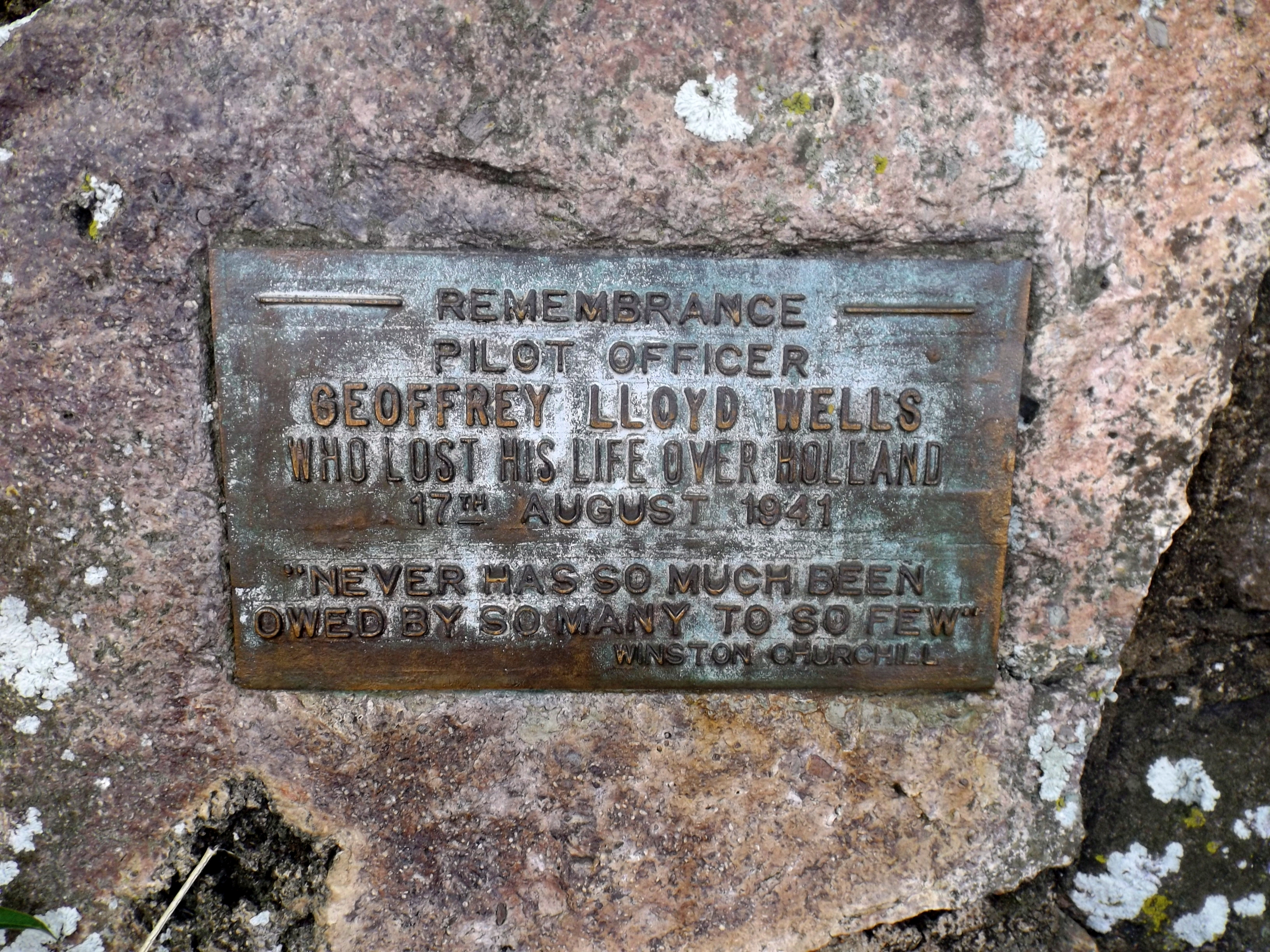
Seat plaque, 2014

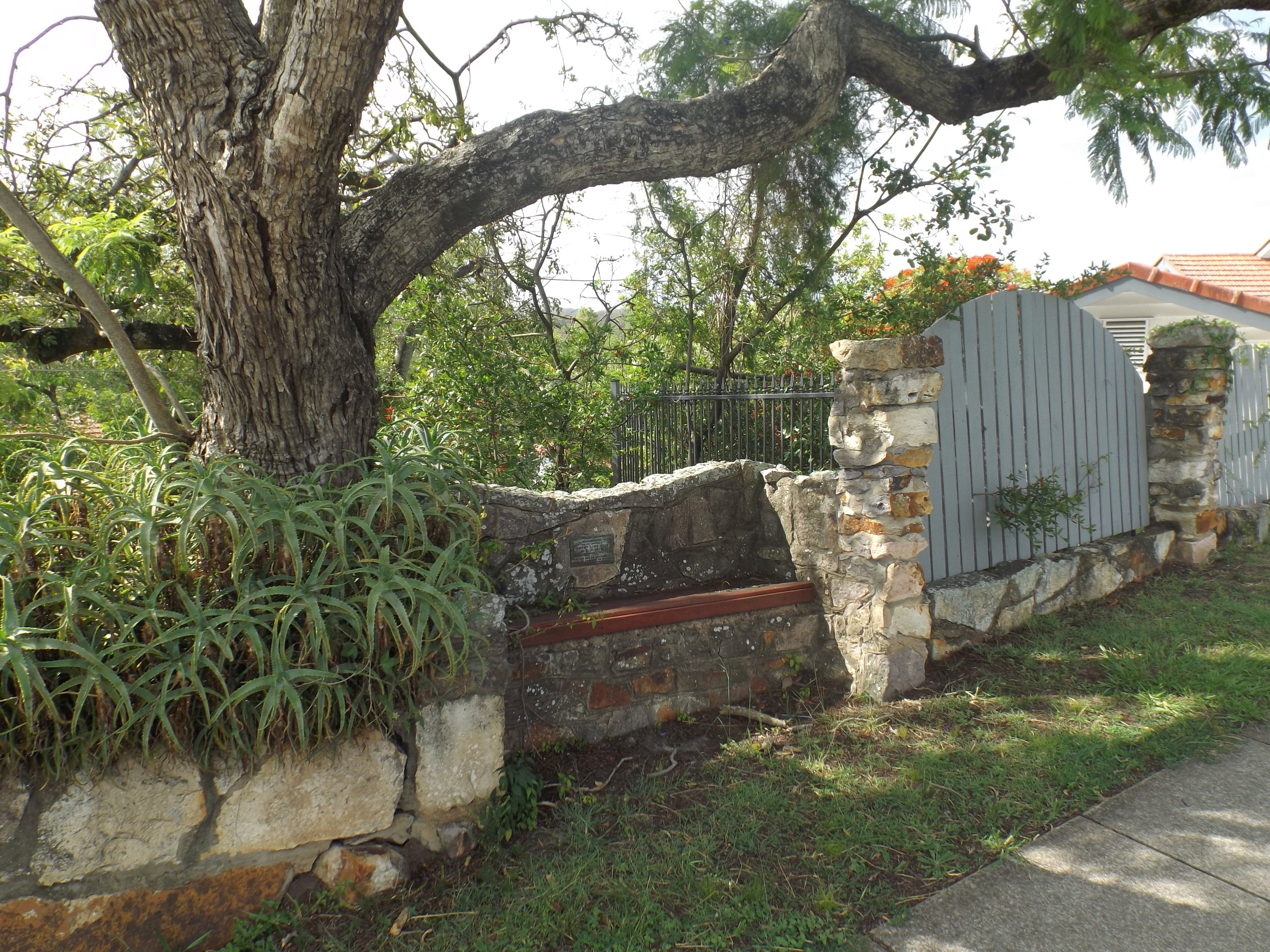
The seat and Stanley Terrace footpath

The seat is of rustic design, constructed of slabs of Brisbane tuff. It is set into the front garden wall, also of tuff, fronting Stanley Terrace.

The back of the seat is butterfly-shaped and has a centrally placed metal plaque. In addition to the details of Wells' death, the plaque bears the quote from Winston Churchill: "never has so much been owed by so many to so few".

Timber slats forming the seat have been reconstructed. The style of the fence above the surrounding wall has changed since the seat's construction. However, together with the adjacent shady jacaranda tree, the fence and seat combine to create a picturesque resting spot for passing pedestrians.

== Heritage listing ==
Pilot Officer Geoffrey Lloyd Wells Memorial Seat was listed on the Queensland Heritage Register on 21 October 1992 having satisfied the following criteria.

The place is important in demonstrating the evolution or pattern of Queensland's history.

It is illustrative of the sustained tradition of memorialising the war dead, which had been established in Queensland at the turn of the 20th century with the South African War of 1899–1902, and popularised during and immediately following the First World War (1914–1918).

The place demonstrates rare, uncommon or endangered aspects of Queensland's cultural heritage.

The Pilot Officer Geoffrey Lloyd Wells Memorial Seat at Taringa is a rare private memorial erected for public benefit.

The place is important in demonstrating the principal characteristics of a particular class of cultural places.

It is illustrative of the sustained tradition of memorialising the war dead, which had been established in Queensland at the turn of the 20th century with the South African War of 1899–1902, and popularised during and immediately following the First World War (1914–1918).

The place is important because of its aesthetic significance.

It makes an original and attractive contribution to the streetscape, and is significant as an unusual form of war memorial.
