= Abraham Preyer =

Dutch art dealer

- Born: Abraham Preijer; 7 August 1862; Amsterdam, Netherlands
- Died: 27 May 1927 (aged 64); Brussels, Belgium
- Occupations: Art dealer and collector

Abraham Preyer (7 August 1862 – 27 May 1927) was a Dutch art dealer and collector, active in Amsterdam and The Hague, and who had firms, Preyer & Co, and Kunsthandel A. Preyer.

He was born Abraham Preijer in Amsterdam on 7 August 1862, the son of Christoffel Jan Preijer and Helena Maria Westenberg.

Preyer's collection of Dutch Old Masters was considered "one of the finest in Europe".

He sold works to fellow dealer Jacques Goudstikker, including Jan Steen's Sacrifice of Iphigenia in 1926.

In 1926, Preyer made a large donation to build the Collège néerlandais in Paris in memory of his son Arthur Preyer, a lieutenant in the American Air Force who died in Italy on 18 August 1918.

He married Wilhelmina Keij (1867–1944) on 23 April 1891 in Baarn, Netherlands. They had four daughters and one son, William Arthur Preyer, born in Chicago on 4 July 1893.

He died in Brussels, Belgium on 27 May 1927.
