= Collège néerlandais =

Coordinates: 48.8217°N 2.3306°E

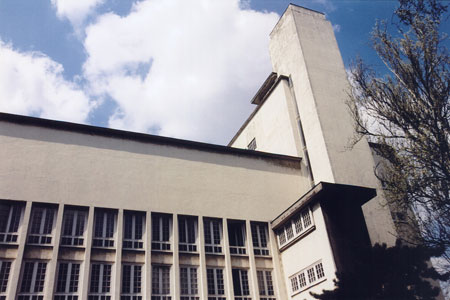
- Interactive map of the Collège néerlandais area

General information
- Location: France
- Construction started: 1929
- Construction stopped: 1938

The Collège néerlandais is a residence in the Cité internationale universitaire de Paris. It is the only building built by Willem Marinus Dudok in France.

== History ==
Built between 1929 and 1938, it was inaugurated on December 2, 1938. President Albert Lebrun and the Minister of Education Jean Zay both attended the opening. The Dutch Princess Juliana did not attend but was represented by the baron of Burmania Rengers.

Abraham Preyer, collector and art dealer, donated a large sum in 1926 for the construction of the building in memory of his son Arthur Preyer, a lieutenant in the American Air Force who died in Italy on the 18 August 1918 during World War I. The founding committee was chaired by Jonkheer John Loudon.

In line with Dutch modernist architecture, Dudok designed a functional and airy building, lit by large strip windows and horizontal bays on the facades of the east wing. The building is made up of four main wings. Originally, the north wing was intended for housing boys, the west wing for housing girls, and the east wing for a community hall, a Dutch studies center, and workshops for artists. The south wing was intended for staff accommodation.

However, due to a lack of sufficient funds, the program was modified during construction. The building remains unfinished and the Dutch Studies Center does not exist. After the inauguration, three additional projects were undertaken: the completion of the fifth, sixth, and seventh floors in 1939, the transformation of the spaces planned for the study center into housing for students in 1945, and the transformation of a terrace of the south wing in rooms in the early 1950s.

Juliana of the Netherlands visited the Dutch College twice: on June 25, 1931, as Crown Princess, and on May 25, 1950, as sovereign.

The building was listed in the supplementary inventory of historic monuments in 1998 and then classified as a Historic Monument in 2005. It underwent a total renovation between 2011 and 2016, led by the Chief Architect of Historic Monuments Hervé Baptiste and the heritage architects Radu Médréa and Marc Férauge.

== Notable residents ==
- Farah Pahlavi
- Michèle Cotta
- Fouad Laroui
- Patrice Zagré, a collaborator of Thomas Sankara, who was killed at his side on October 15, 1987.
- Michel Sanouillet and his wife Anne Sanouillet.
- Jan-Willem Duyvendak
- Erőss Gábor János
- Joke J. Hermsen
- Hubert Pernot
