= Taringa, Queensland =

Taringa
- Suburb
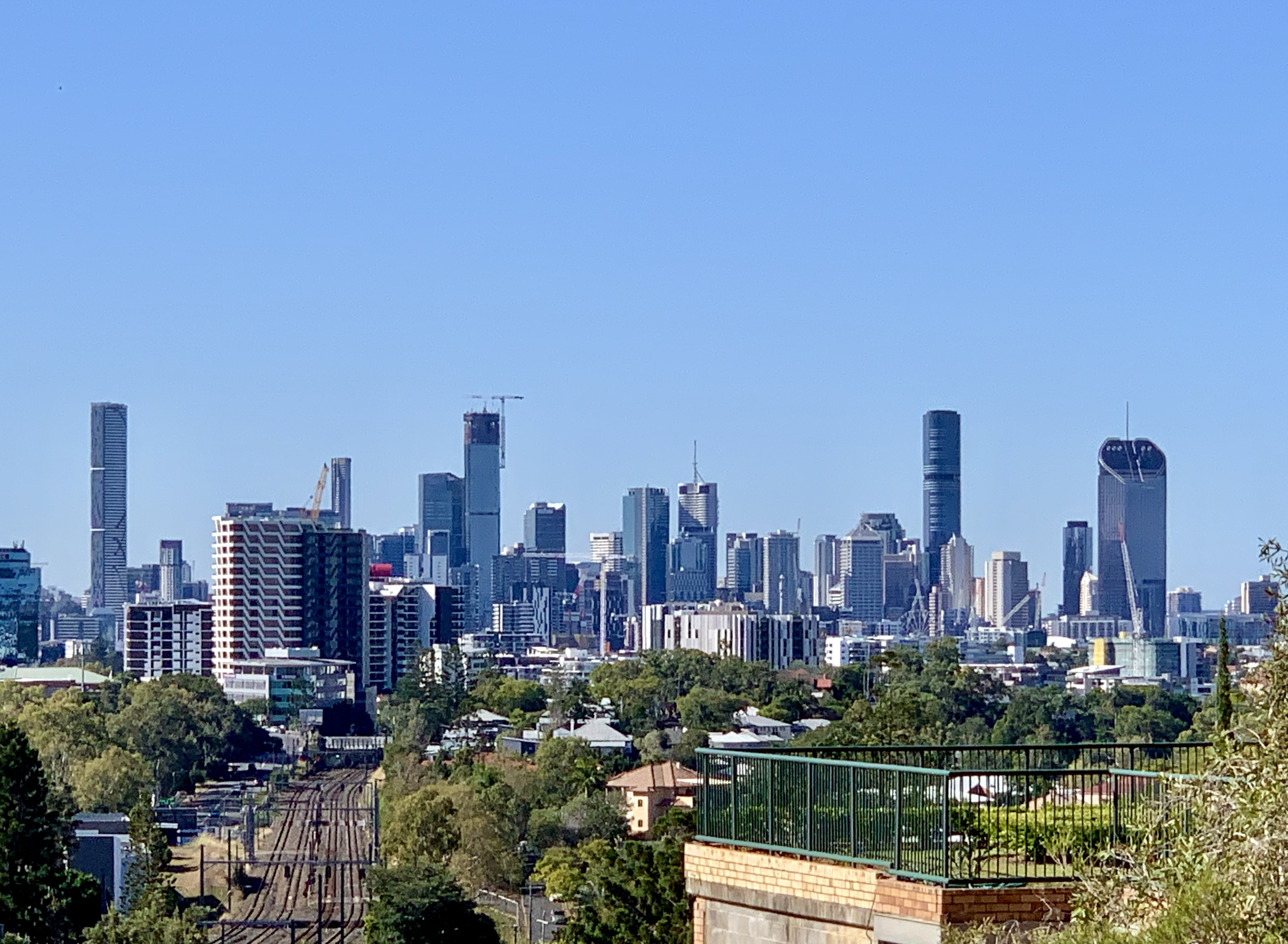
- Brisbane skyline seen from Taringa, Queensland.

- Interactive map of Taringa
- Coordinates: 27.4927°S 152.9844°E
- Country: Australia
- State: Queensland
- City: Brisbane
- LGA: City of Brisbane (Walter Taylor Ward)
- Location: 6.8 km (4.2 mi) SW of Brisbane CBD

Government
  - State electorate: Maiwar
  - Federal division: Ryan

Area
  - Total: 2.1 km^{2} (0.81 sq mi)

Population
  - Total: 8,732 (2021 census)
  - Density: 4,160/km^{2} (10,770/sq mi)
- Time zone: UTC+10:00 (AEST)
- Postcode: 4068
Suburbs around Taringa
Toowong	Toowong	Toowong
Mount Coot-tha	Taringa	St Lucia
Indooroopilly	Indooroopilly	St Lucia

Taringa is a western suburb in the City of Brisbane, Queensland, Australia. In the 2021 census, Taringa had a population of 8,732 people.

== Geography ==
Taringa is 6.8 kilometres (4.2 mi) by road south-west of the Brisbane CBD.

The suburb of Taringa borders Brisbane's Mt Coot-Tha, Toowong, Indooroopilly and St Lucia, and is dominated by a ridge that runs the length of Swann Road, with steep slopes on either side of the ridge.

Taringa is mostly residential, except for a small number of commercial buildings mostly clustered along Moggill Road. It is a popular neighbourhood among the students of the University of Queensland and the Queensland University of Technology because of its proximity to the universities and to Brisbane CBD.

== History ==
The name Taringa is a combination of two Aboriginal words: tarau (stones) and nga (made up of). Together, they mean "place of stones".

The Main Line railway from Roma Street railway station to Indooroopilly railway station opened on 14 June 1875 with the area being served by West Milton railway station (as it was initially known) before being renamed Taringa later that year.

On 15 December 1883, auctioneer John W. Todd offered 176 suburban lots, mostly of 25.3 perches (640 m^{2}) in the Abbotsford Estate, bounded by Stanley Terrace to the north, Mt Cootha Road (now Moorak Street) to the east, Moggill Road to the south-east, Waverley Road to the south, and Sarah Street (now Manchester Terrace) and Woodstock Avenue to the west.

On 16 August 1884, auctioneer John W. Todd offered 173 suburban sites, mostly between 16 and 20 perches (400 and 510 m^{2}) in the South Toowong Estate, which is bounded by Wilson Street (now Whitmore Street) to the west, Alpha Street to the north, Indooroopilly Road to the north and east and the southern side of Oxford Street, including Ellerslie Crescent and Bellevue Parade. The sale include the house Ellerslie on 1 acre (0.40 ha) of land.

On 14 February 1885, auctioneer John W. Todd offered 79 suburban sites in the Taringa Township, immediately north of the Taringa railway station. 58 of the lots were sold for a total of £1012/15/0.

In August 1886, auctioneer John W. Todd offered 32 buildings sites (all 0.75-acre (0.30 ha) or larger) in the Belgrave and Riverview Estate in "South Toowong". The estate was bounded by Swan Road to the north, Indooroopilly Road to the east, Todd Street to the south, and Kobada Street to the west.

On 19 March 1887, auctioneer R.J. Cottell offered suburban lots in the Taringa Township, which was along Harrys Road between Stanley Terrace and present-day Moggill Road. The lots ranged from 16.15 to 27.8 perches (408 to 703 m^{2}).

In 1891, a Baptist church opened in Taringa.

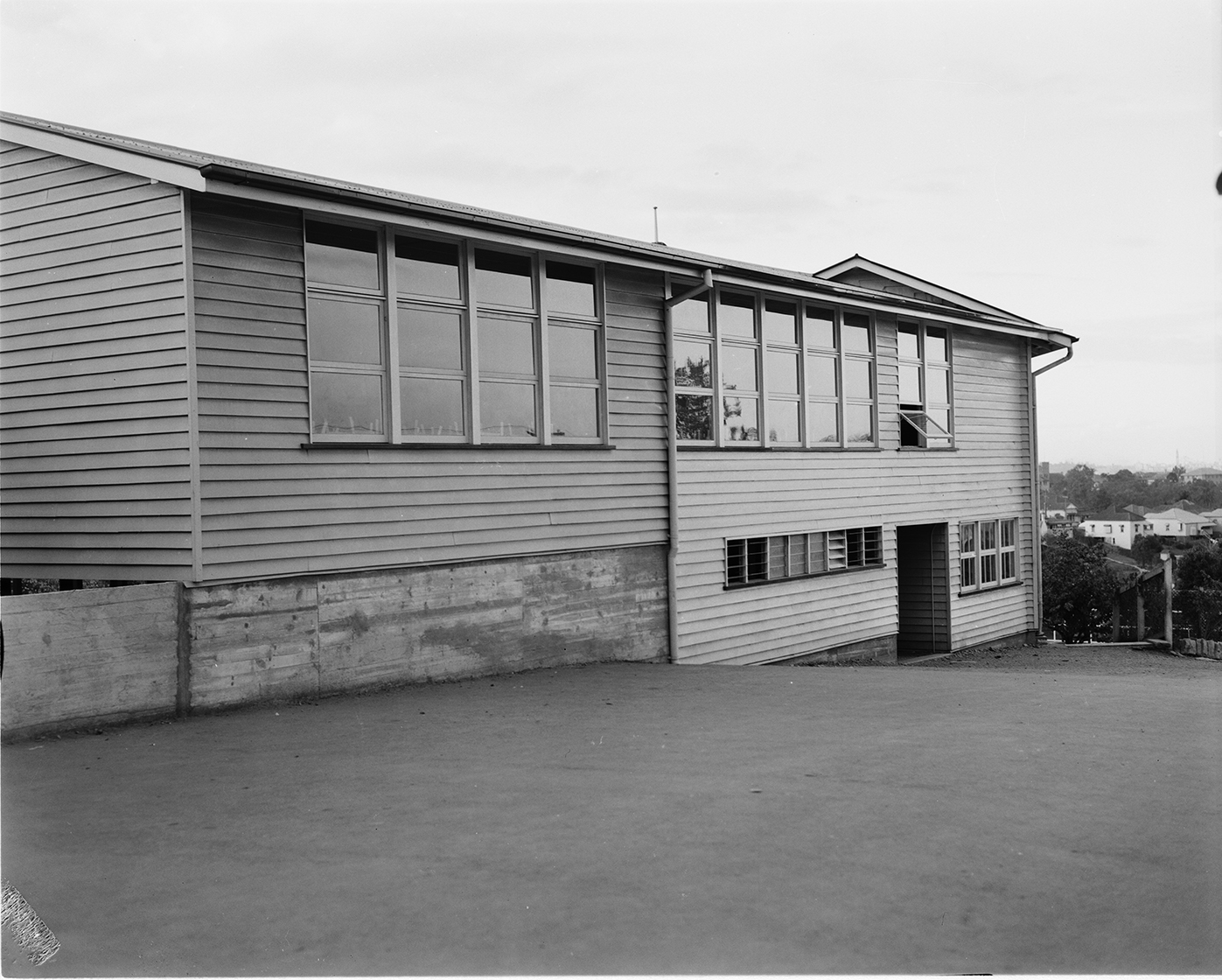
Taringa State School, 1957

Taringa State School opened on 8 October 1900 and closed on 14 December 1996. The school was located between Moggill Road and Morrow Street (27.4921°S 152.9810°E).

On Saturday 20 June 1908, Venerable H.F Le Fanu, Anglican Archdeacon of Brisbane laid the foundation stone and performed a stump capping ceremony for St Paul's Anglican Church. It was at 165 (approx) Moggill Road (on the present site of Taringa Central complex, 27.4924°S 152.9803°E). It closed circa 1982-1986 and was removed.

On 30 April 1921, auctioneer Cameron Bros offered 27 suburban allotments ranging from 20 to 33 perches (510 to 830 m^{2}) in the Coomoola Park Estate on the north side of Stanley Terrace near the junction with Hillsdon Road.

The Lionel Brand of Worcestershire sauce was manufactured in Taringa.

On 3 December 1933, the Montrose Home for Crippled opened in Montrose, the home of Presbyterian philanthropist George Marchant which he donated for the purpose. The house was on a 5-acre (2.0 ha) site at 180-200 Swann Road, extending back to Seven Oaks Street (27.4975°S 152.9862°E). When the home needed larger premises, in 1937, Marchant purchased Ardeyne, a 10-acre (4.0 ha) site in Corinda for the long-term operation of the home under the management of the Queensland Society for Crippled Children. The home closed in 2001 as the organisation transitioned away from institutional care towards community and in-home support services. The home had its own school. The Montrose Home School for Crippled Children opened in January 1934 in Taringa. In March 1934 it was renamed Montrose Special School. It relocated with the home to Coarinda. The school closed on 2 June 2006. The home and school were at 54 Consort Street in Corinda.

Gailey Road is named after Richard Gailey an Irish-Australian architect.

== Demographics ==
In the 2011 census, the population of Taringa was 7,176, 50.4% female and 49.6% male. The median age of the Taringa population was 29 years, 8 years below the Australian median. 63.8% of people living in Taringa were born in Australia, compared to the national average of 69.8%; the next most common countries of birth were England 3.8%, China 3%, New Zealand 2.4%, Malaysia 2.1%, India 2%. 75.9% of people spoke only English at home; the next most common languages were 3.6% Mandarin, 1.6% Cantonese, 1.3% Malay, 1.1% Spanish, 0.9% Persian (excluding Dari).

In the 2016 census, Taringa had a population of 8,376 people.

In the 2021 census, Taringa had a population of 8,732 people.

== Heritage listings ==
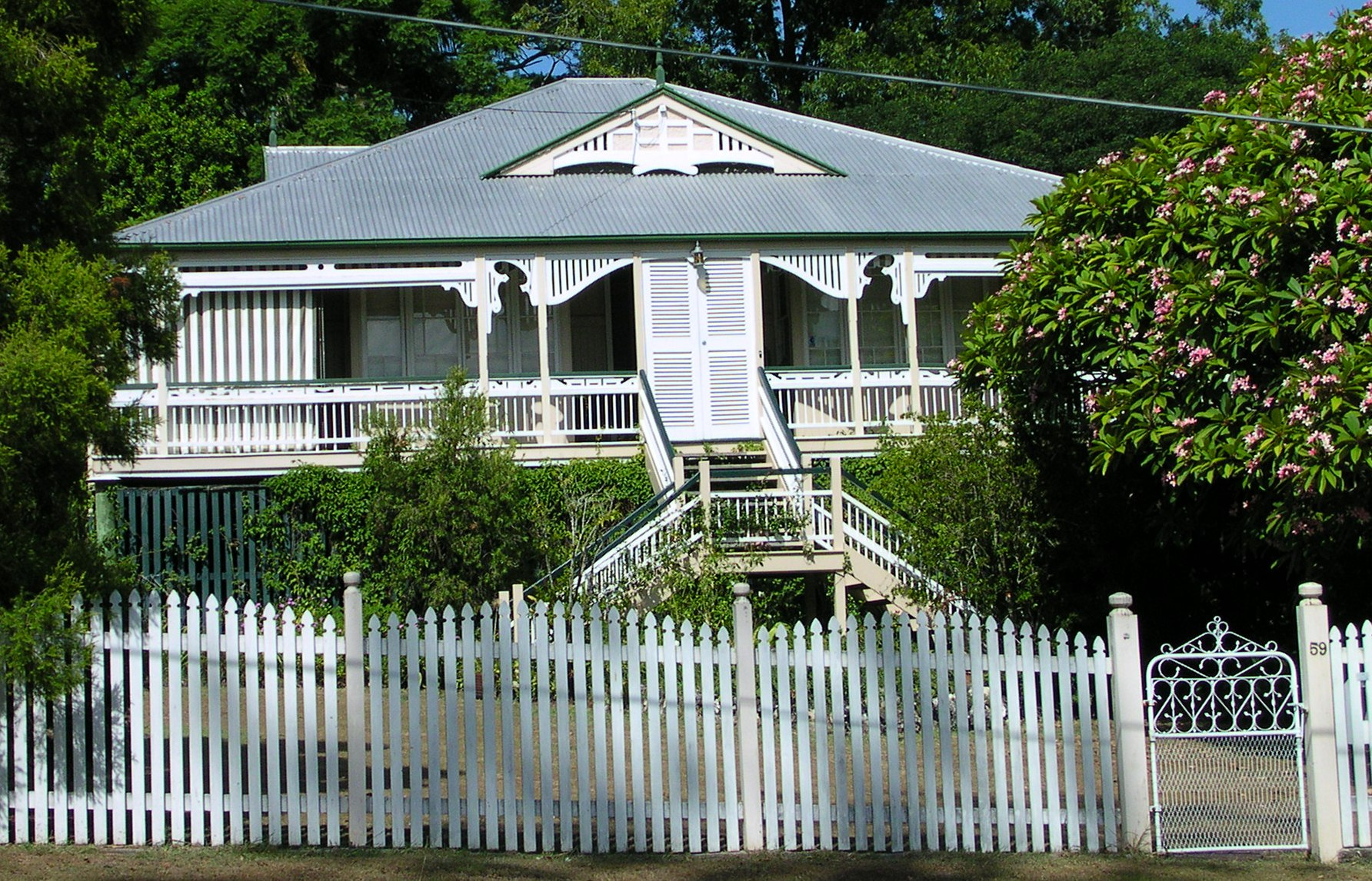
Taringa has many detached homes in the Queenslander architecture style.

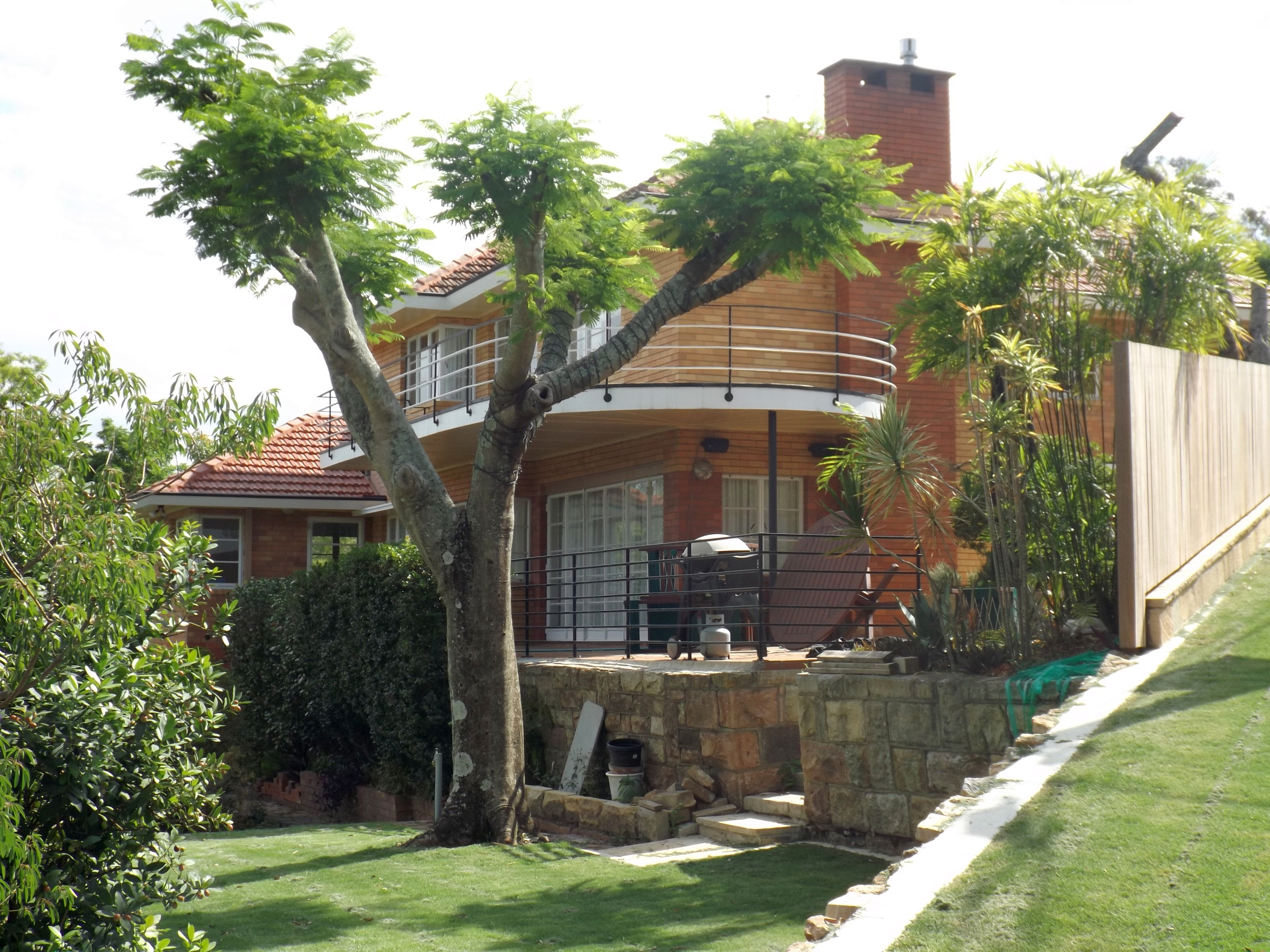
The heritage listed Fulton Residence

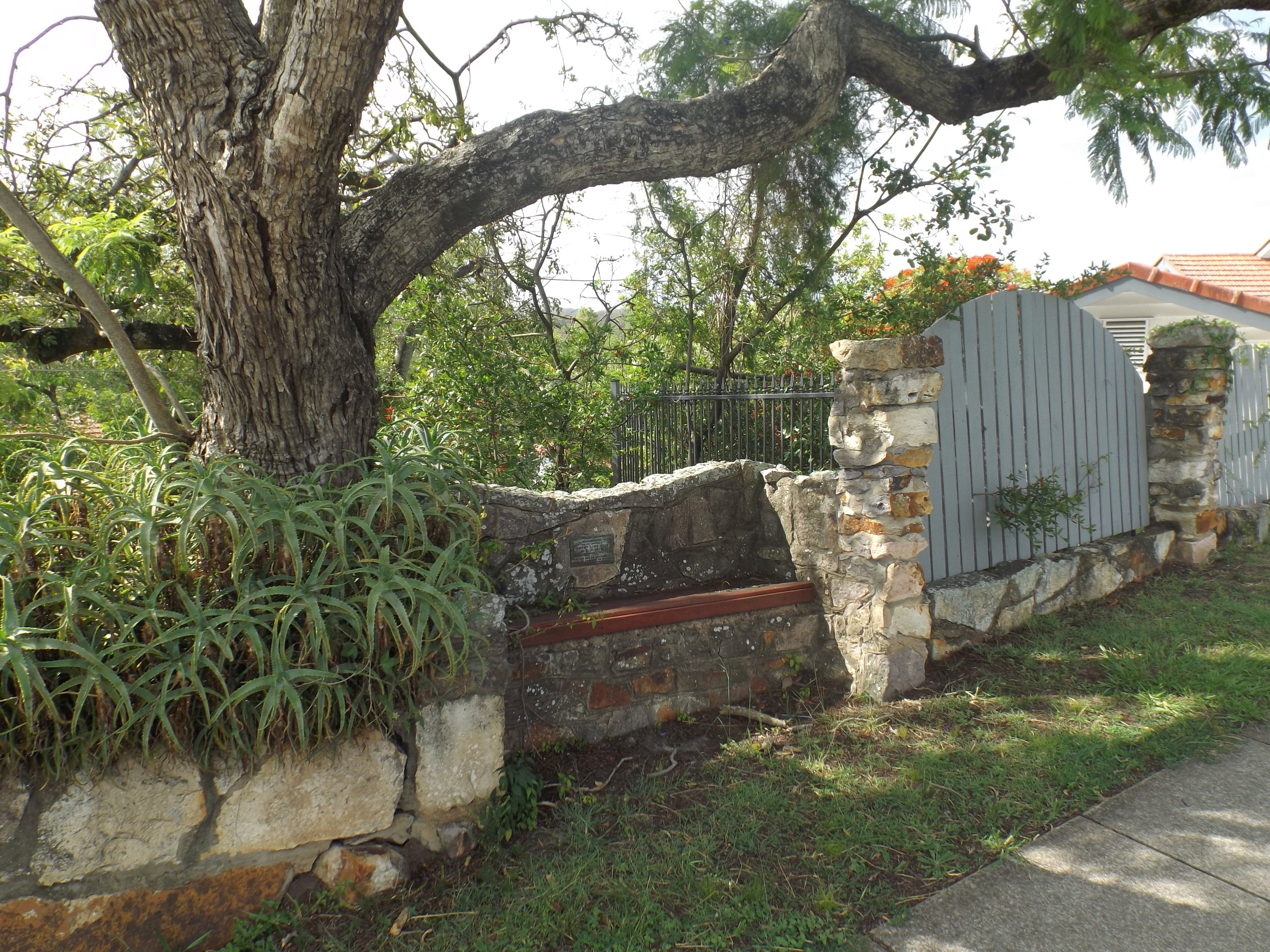
The Pilot Officer Geoffrey Lloyd Wells Memorial Seat was added to the Queensland Heritage Register in 1992

Taringa has a number of heritage-listed sites, including:

- Edge Hills (Federation-era house), 17 Darvall Street
- Au-Argentum (California Bungalow style house), 26 Darvall Street
- Laurel Bank (also known as St. Pauls' Court), 29 Ellerslie Crescent
- Taringa Masonic Hall, 4 Frederick Street (27.491600°S 152.980350°E)
- Daheim (Federation-era house), 69 Hillsdon Road
- Hillsdon Road Kindergarten, 79 Hillsdon Road
- Fulton Residence, 209 Indooroopilly Road (27.5011°S 152.991°E)
- Interwar Old English house, 20 Morrow Street
- Victorian-era cottage, 42 Oxford Terrace
- Pilot Officer Geoffrey Lloyd Wells Memorial Seat, 103 Stanley Terrace (27.4892°S 152.9803°E)
- Federation-era house, 178 Stanley Terrace
- Rothley (Arts and Crafts style house), 163 Swann Road

== Education ==
There are no government schools in Taringa. The nearest government primary schools are Toowong State School in neighbouring Toowong to the north, Ironside State School in neighbouring St Lucia to the east, and Indooroopilly State School in neighbouring Indooroopilly to the south-west. The nearest government secondary school is Indooroopilly State High School, also in Indooroopilly.

The Japanese Language Supplementary School of Queensland Japanese School of Brisbane (ブリスベン校 Burisuben Kō), a weekend Japanese school, maintains its school office in Taringa. It holds its classes at Indooroopilly State High School in Indooroopilly.

== Community groups ==
The Taringa Scout Den is the home of the Taringa-Milton-Toowong Scout Group. It is also used as a GoJu Karate training facility and for Yoga.

== Sport ==
Taringa is the home of the Taringa Rovers Soccer Football Club, who play in the Brisbane Premier League.

== Transport ==
By Train, Taringa railway station (27.4931°S 152.9822°E) is part of the Queensland Rail network, on the Ipswich, Rosewood and Springfield railway lines providing travel to the Brisbane central business district, Ipswich, Rosewood and Springfield.

By Bus, Taringa is serviced by Transport for Brisbane buses to the Brisbane central business district, University of Queensland bus station, Indooroopilly, Long Pocket, Chapel Hill and Kenmore.

By Road, Taringa's main thoroughfares are Swann Road and Moggill Road.

== Notable people ==
- Alfred Cecil Chave, tennis player, administrator, journalist and broadcaster.
- Gwen Harwood, poet, was born in Taringa.
- Dorothy Hill, geologist and palaeontologist, the first female professor at an Australian university, and the first female president of the Australian Academy of Science was born in Taringa in 1907.
- Frank William Moorhouse, born in Taringa, Chief Inspector of the Fisheries and Game Department of South Australia from 1936 to 1959.
- Clement Lindley Wragge, meteorologist, lived in Taringa in a house named Capemba in the 1890s.
