= Hilversum Town Hall =

Town hall in the Netherlands famous for its modernist design

Coordinates: 52.2293°N 5.1695°E

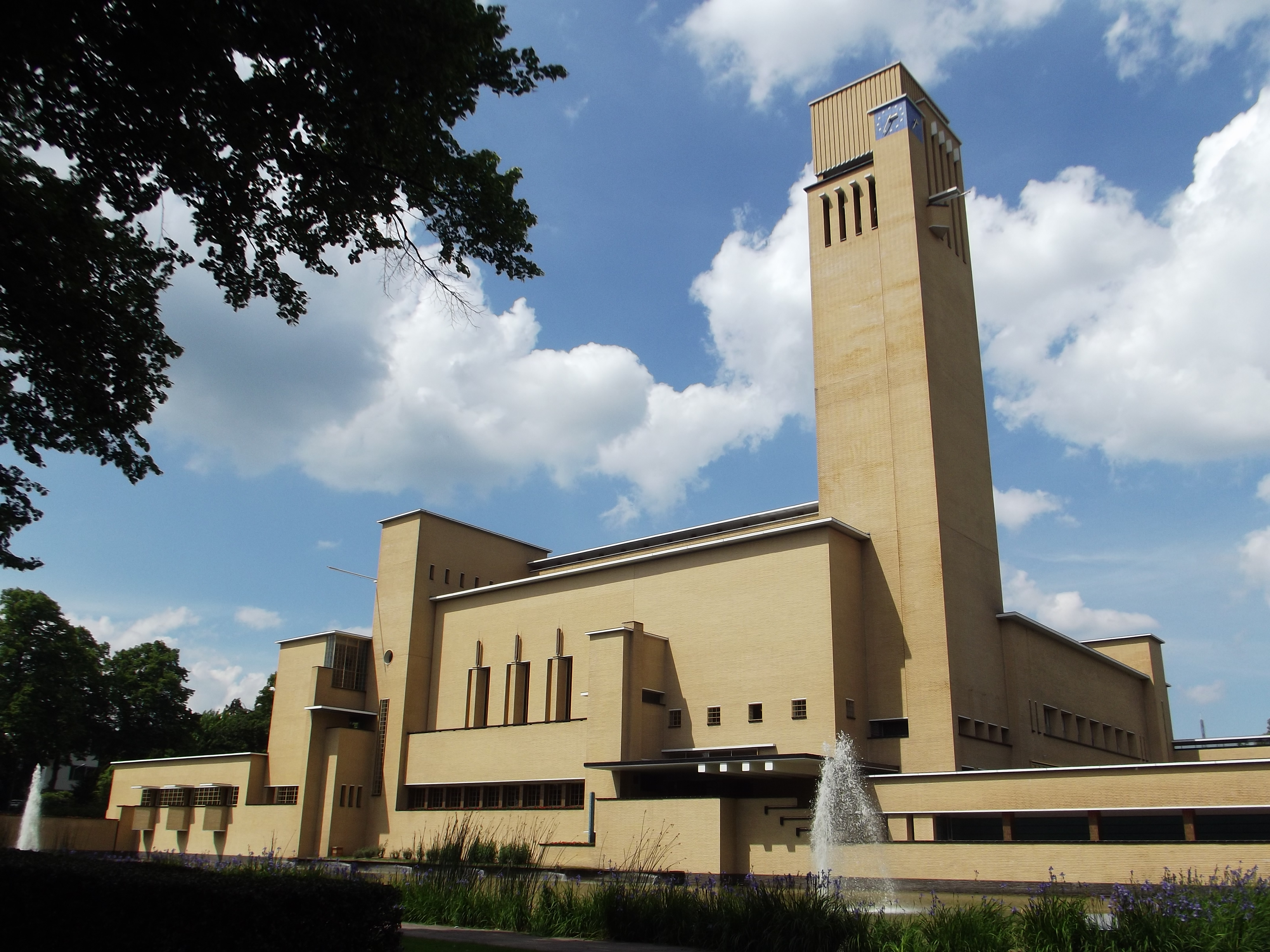
Hilversum Town Hall by architect Willem Marinus Dudok

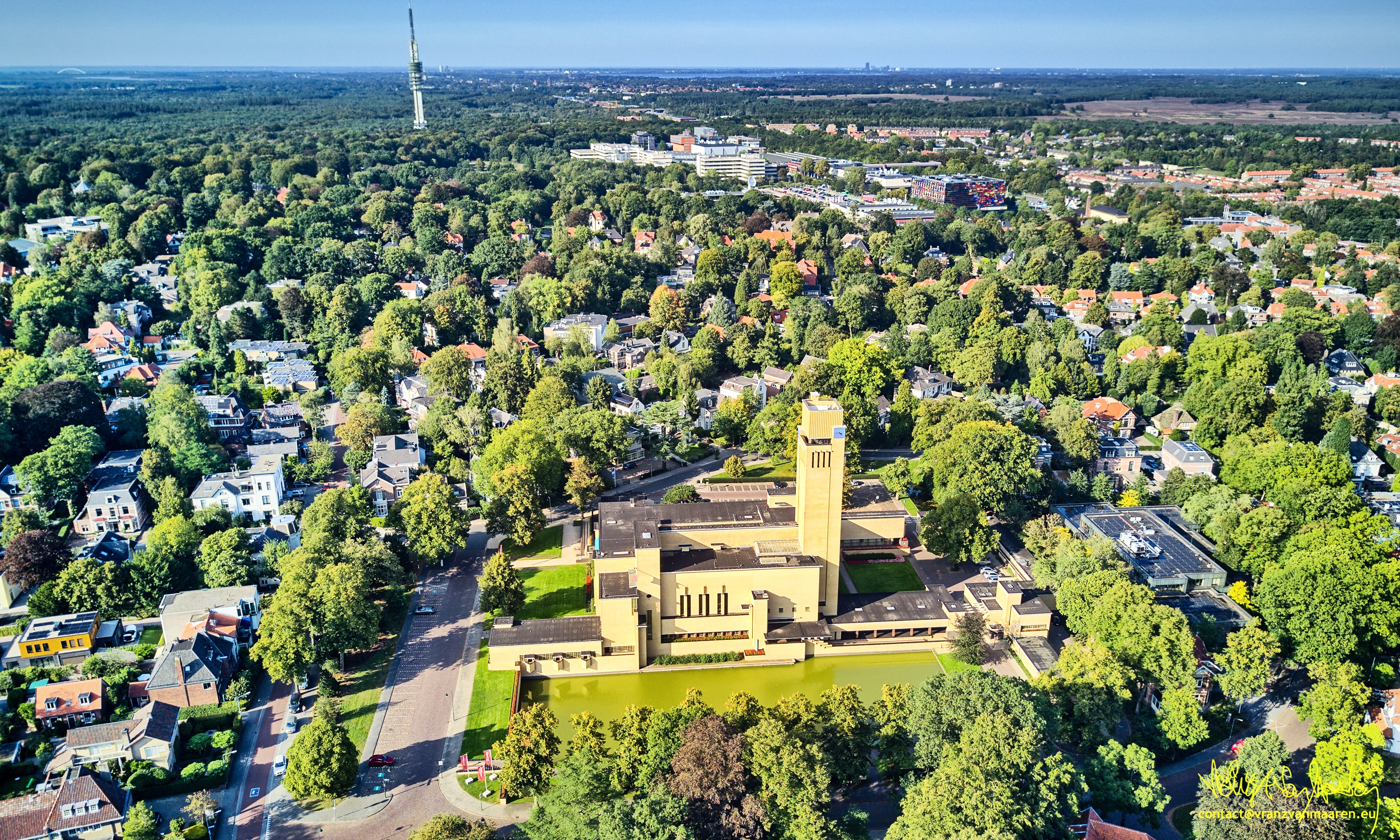
2020-09-19 Drone Shot Raadhuis and Media Park, Hilversum

The Hilversum Town Hall (Dutch: Raadhuis Hilversum) was designed by Willem Marinus Dudok to serve as seat of the municipal council of Hilversum in the Netherlands. Construction was completed in 1931. It is a much-admired building that is considered the finest example of Dudok's work and internationally recognized as one of the most influential buildings of its time.

== Planning stage ==
Dudok became Director of Public Works of Hilversum in 1915. Initially, he designed a traditional building intended to fit into the town's downtown area. However, due to World War I and lack of funds this was not constructed. Dudok presented the first sketches for a new design in 1924, for which he was able to use an elevated location on the former Den Witten Hull estate, which had been purchased by the municipality in 1923 to the northwest of the town centre. This location, which did not constrain the building with composition or height restrictions, gave Dudok the freedom to express his considerable capabilities. It is surrounded by a park and the light-coloured building rises from water, highlighting the garden city character that Hilversum wanted to achieve.

== The building ==
Somewhat reminiscent of the early designs of Frank Lloyd Wright, the Town Hall building consists of two squares; an inner courtyard surrounded by offices and a second courtyard surrounded by low spaces and traversed by a service road. The structure was completed in 1931, by which time Dudok was Hilversum's Municipal Architect, and was enthusiastically embraced by the people of Hilversum for its balance between form and function, fine workmanship and high quality finishes and materials used. Some critics, however, accused Dudok of diluting modernist designs and being halfway modernist, lacking a specific style. However, the result is considered by many to be a testament to the consistent harmonic form, function, art and human need. Hilversum Town Hall is one of the most successful buildings in the history of the modernist movement.

== Subsequent history ==
During World War II the building was used as headquarters of the German Wehrmacht, for which it was necessary to camouflage the prominent tower. The sound of its bell was broadcast live every hour on public radio stations until the 1960s, reflecting the town's role as the principal media centre for the Netherlands. The building was restored between 1989 and 1995. Almost all of the original bricks, which had been baked too softly and were porous, had sustained frost damage. These had to be largely replaced during the restoration.Restoration costs caused some dispute, as it was for a time proposed to sell a painting by Mondrian, who came from nearby Amersfoort, to pay for the restoration.
