= Box gutter =

Type of rain gutter on a roof

A box gutter, internal gutter, parallel gutter, or trough gutter is a rain gutter on a roof usually rectangular in shape; it may be lined with EPDM rubber, metal, asphalt, or roofing felt, and may be concealed behind a parapet or the eaves, or in a roof valley.

Box gutters are essentially placed between parallel surfaces, as in a valley between parallel roofs or at the junction of a roof and a parapet wall. They should not be confused with so-called valley gutters or valley flashings which occur at the non-parallel intersection of roof surfaces, typically at right angled internal corners of pitched roofs. Provision is made in the design of the gutter to have a rain flow to the outlet with a maximum slope of 1:200 and a minimum of 1:400.

== Gallery of sketches ==
Note! The sketches in this section reference terminology commonly used in the UK and Australia.

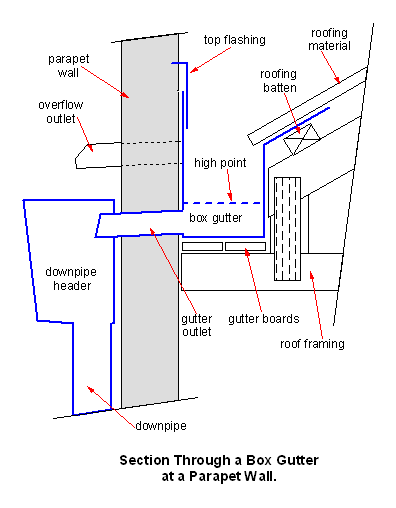
A section through a box gutter at the intersection of the bottom of a sloping roof and a parapet wall.

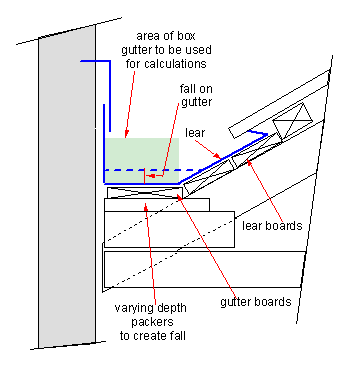
A simpler box gutter arrangement at a parapet wall that give a bare minimum of compliance to the Building Code of Australia (BCA)

A box gutter between two parallel roof surfaces.

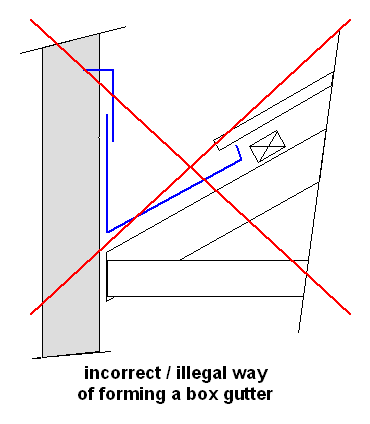
A sketch of a now illegal gutter construction under the BCA. A design to be avoided.
