= Townsville University Hospital =

Coordinates: 19.3203°S 146.7612°E

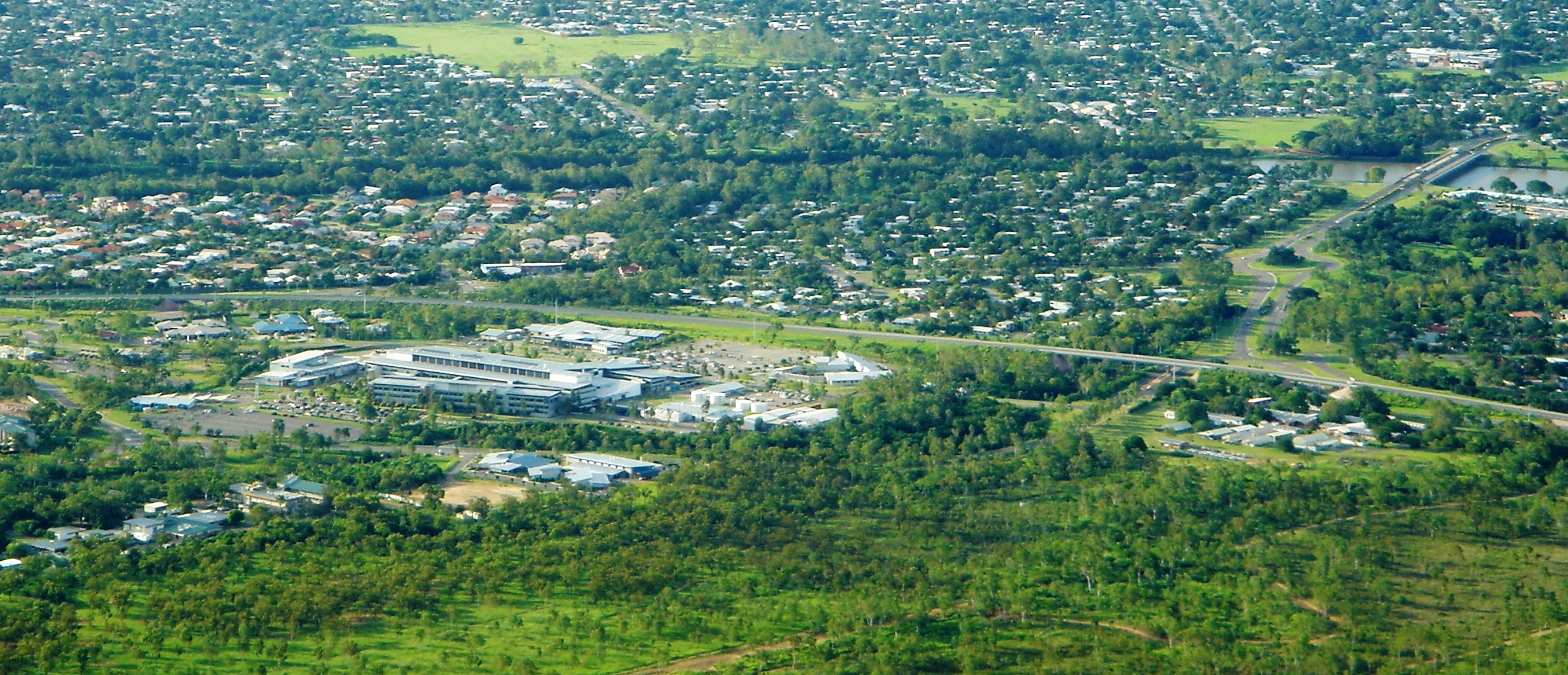
- Townsville University Hospital, with Ross River bridge and the (previously) Davies Laboratory CSIRO visible to the right and JCU entrance on the left

Geography
- Location: Angus Smirth Drive, Douglas, Townsville, Queensland, Australia

History
- Opened: 1951

Links
- Lists: Hospitals in Australia

Townsville University Hospital (TUH), formerly The Townsville Hospital (TTH), is a public tertiary care hospital on Angus Smith Drive, Douglas, Townsville, Queensland, Australia. It is the largest facility within the Townsville Hospital and Health Service (HHS) geographic area. TUH is the major trauma centre for northern Queensland and all medical and surgical specialties are represented. It provides healthcare across the entire North Queensland region, with patients from as far as Mount Isa and Cape York being airlifted or transported to the hospital on a daily basis. This is the third general hospital to be built in Townsville with construction completed in 2001. The next main tertiary referral hospital is the Royal Brisbane and Women's Hospital in Herston, Brisbane, some 1,375 kilometres (854 mi) distant.

== Activity ==
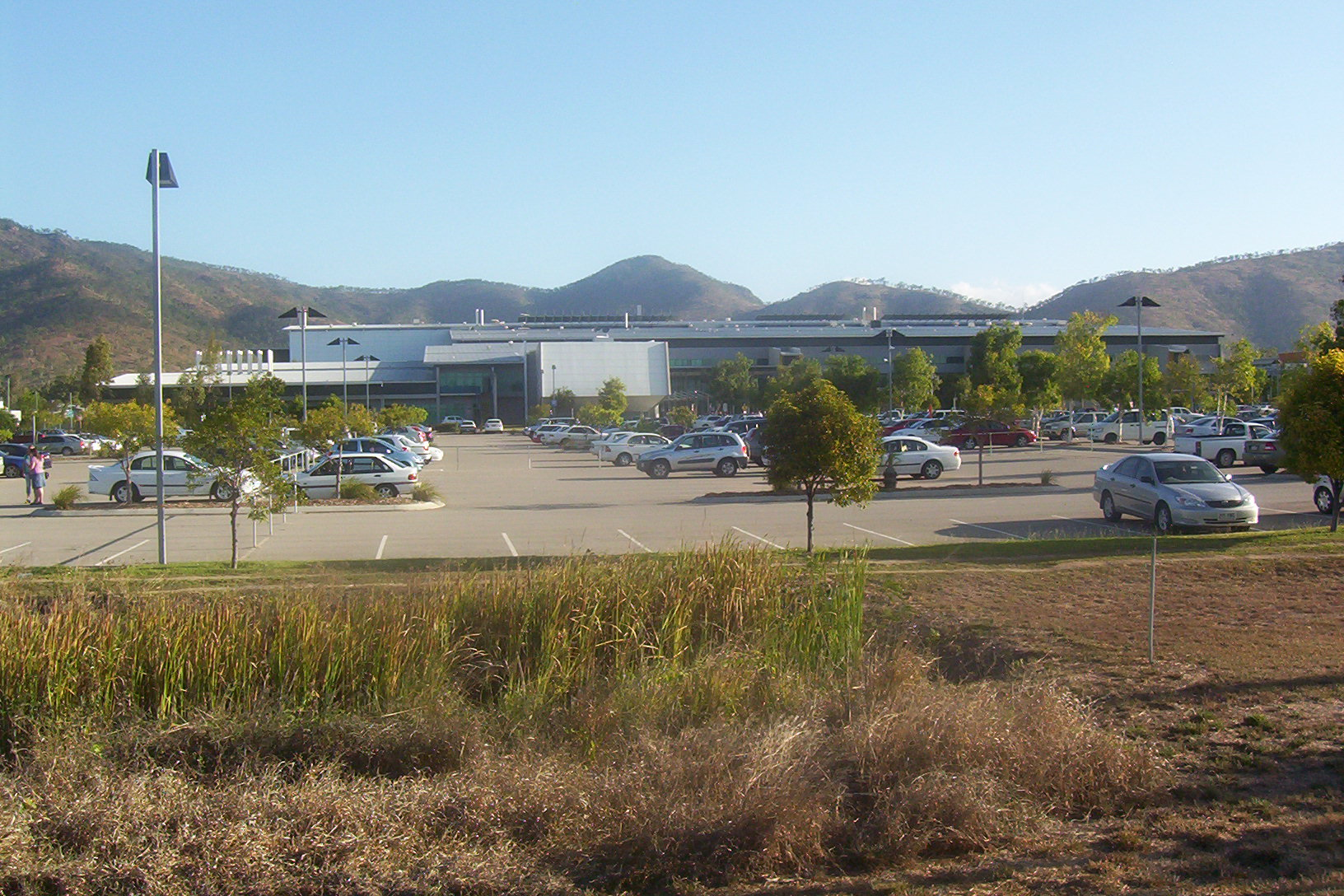
Townsville University Hospital from the Douglas Arterial Road

The Townsville University Hospital is the largest facility in the Townsville HHS, and is the only tertiary referral hospital in northern Australia. Townsville HHS provides public healthcare services across an extensive range of specialties in acute, community and outreach settings.

The Townsville HHS covers a geographic expanse extending north to Cardwell, west to Richmond, south to Home Hill, and east to Magnetic and Palm Islands. As northern Australia's only tertiary hospital and health service, the HHS services an extensive catchment stretching from Mackay in the south, north to the Torres Strait Islands, and west to the Northern Territory border. The catchment population is more than 695,000 people.

The HHS has a geographic footprint of 148,000 square kilometres and is home to a resident population of 238,614 or around 4.8 per cent of Queensland's overall population.

The HHS is a major economic driver for the region with approximately one in 17 people in paid work employed by the HHS. The Townsville HHS employs 6,248 clinical and non-clinical staff who deliver person-centred care defined by quality, safety and compassion to diverse communities across North Queensland.

The Townsville University Hospital currently has 775 beds. The Townsville University Hospital is the major teaching hospital of the James Cook University School of Medicine. The current Chief Executive of the Townsville HHS, which includes the Townsville University Hospital, is Kieran Keyes and the current board chair is Mr Tony Mooney AM.

The Townsville HHS comprises 20 facilities across its catchment. These are:

- Ayr Health Service
- Cambridge Street Health Campus, Vincent
- Cardwell Community Clinic
- Charters Towers Health Service
- Charters Towers Rehabilitation Unit
- Eventide Residential Aged Care Facility (Charters Towers)
- Home Hill Health Service
- Hughenden Multi-Purpose Health Service
- Ingham Health Service
- Josephine Sailor Adolescent Inpatient Unit and Day Service (Kirwan)
- Joyce Palmer Health Service (Palm Island)
- Palm Island Primary Health Care Centre
- Kirwan Community Health Campus
- Magnetic Island Community Clinic
- North Ward Health Campus
- Palmerston Street Health Campus (Vincent)
- Parklands Residential Aged Care Facility (Kirwan)
- Richmond Health Service
- Townsville University Hospital (Douglas)
- Townsville Public Health Unit

In 2017–2018, the Townsville HHS achieved level one performance status; one of only two HHSs to achieve this rating. Performance levels are determined by the Department of Health against key components described in the ‘Delivering a High Performing Health System for Queenslanders: Performance Framework’.

The HHS is accredited against the Australian Commission on Healthcare Standards and in 2017–2018 demonstrated achievement against prescribed measures in the HHS Strategic Plan 2014–2018 (2017 Update). These included a decrease in the Aboriginal and Torres Strait Islander rate of discharge against medical advice, improved treat and seen-in-time rates, an increase in followers on social media and a budget surplus.

== History ==
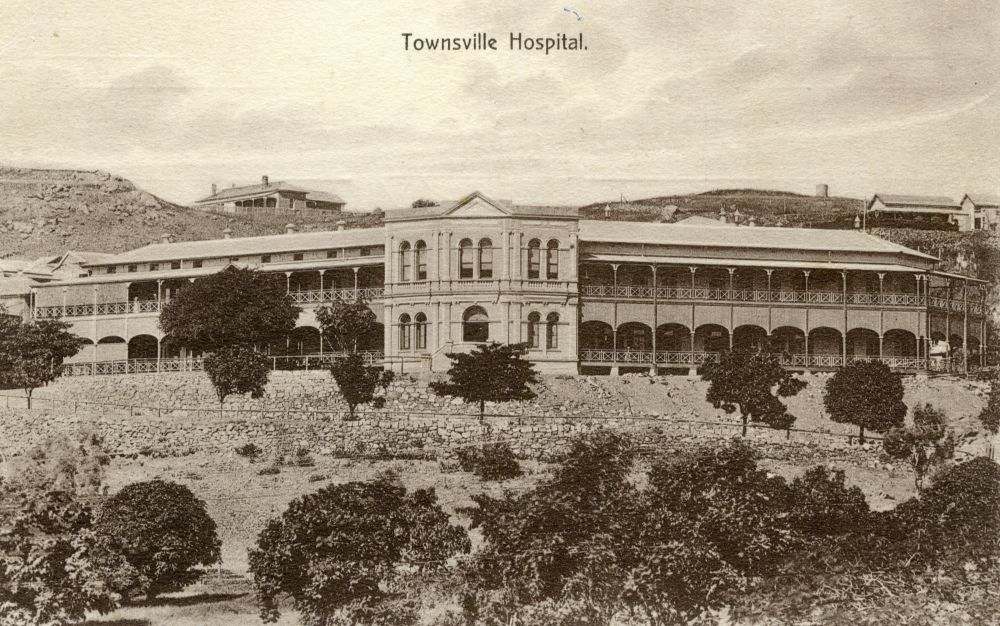
Townsville Hospital, c. 1906.

There have been three general hospitals in Townsville over the city's 150-year history. The First Townsville Hospital was established in 1882 in North Ward. The two story brick building accommodated 70 patients. When Cyclone Leonta struck Townsville in May 1903, it caused extensive local damage and the hospital partially collapsed. The Second Townsville General Hospital opened in North Ward on 21 April 1951. The old Townsville General Hospital psychiatric service was the focus of intense scrutiny in the 1980s after it was revealed 65 people had died in the psychiatric ward. The deaths and subsequent inquest gave rise to the Burden Inquiry, Report of the National Inquiry into the Human Rights of People with Mental Illness 1990. The North Ward hospital could not expand any further due to its urban location and was regularly reaching absolute capacity. However the heritage-listed hospital buildings, with their landmark white art deco appearance, enviable location, and water views, were retained and were turned into exclusive apartments.

The third and current Townsville hospital at Douglas began construction in 1998 and opened in 2001. It is co-located with the James Cook University.
