= Willem Marinus Dudok =

Dutch architect (1884–1974)

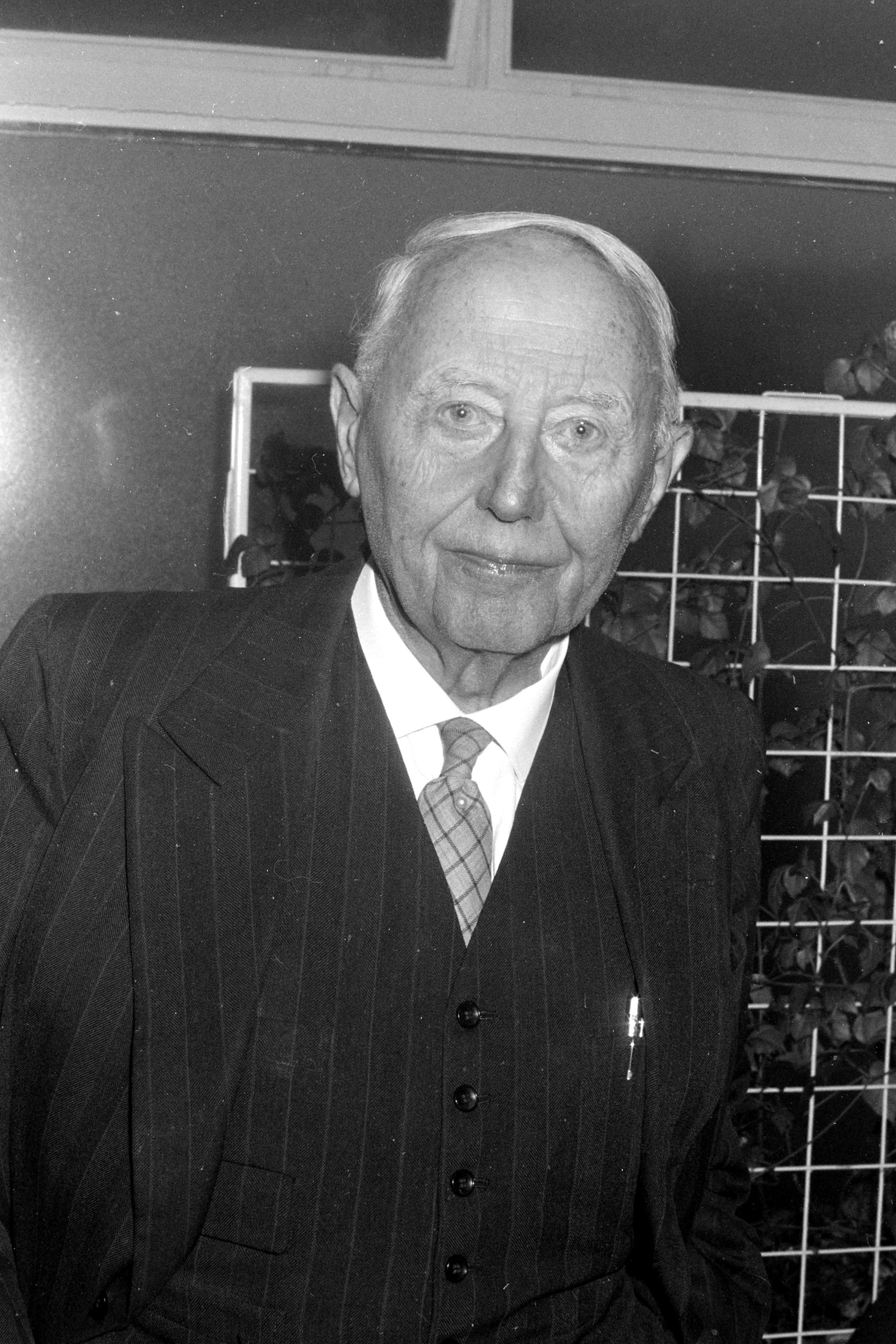
- Architect W.M. Dudok, 1962
- Born: 6 July 1884; Amsterdam, Netherlands
- Died: 6 April 1974 (aged 89); Hilversum, Netherlands
- Occupation: Architect
- Awards: Royal Gold Medal (1935); AIA Gold Medal (1955)
- Buildings: Hilversum Town Hall

Willem Marinus Dudok (6 July 1884 – 6 April 1974) was a famous Dutch modernist architect. He was born in Amsterdam. He became City Architect for the town of Hilversum in 1928 where he was best known for the brick Hilversum Town Hall, completed in 1931. Not only did he design the building, but also the interior including the carpets, furniture and even the mayor's meeting hammer. He also designed and built about 75 houses, public buildings and entire neighborhoods.

== Career ==
Dudok initially chose to pursue a military career. At the military academy of Breda he studied civil engineering and was allowed to assist in designing military buildings. Influenced by other Dutch architects, such as H. P. Berlage, he rapidly proved able to adapt his own ideas. He was appointed assistant director of Public Works in Leiden in 1913 and Director of Public Works in Hilversum in 1915. He was appointed Hilversum's Municipal Architect in 1928. The same year he was assigned the task of expanding the city, which involved designing housing estates, schools, swimming pools and parks and gardens. While his early style in Hilversum grew out of the Amsterdam School, the dramatic massing, asymmetry, the overhanging eaves and other elements of his landmark Hilversum City Hall were clearly influenced by Frank Lloyd Wright and the Chicago Prairie School. The City Hall is regarded as his masterpiece and manages to merge the requirements of being both a symbol of the city and an efficient administrative building. It is indicative of the garden-city character of Hilversum. Indeed, Dudok was clearly influenced by Ebenezer Howard and Raymond Unwin, pioneers of the Garden City Movement in the United Kingdom. Dudok continued to produce progressive, Dutch modernist structures in Hilversum for decades, through the 1960s, and had international influence. Amongst school designers in the Netherlands, his schools in Hilversum became particularly celebrated.

Dudok was also the architect of the branch of the De Bijenkorf department store in Rotterdam, a spectacular piece of commercial architecture clearly influenced by the Bauhaus, de Stijl, and the streamlining that was popular in both Art Deco and Art Moderne modernist design of the 1920s and 1930s. When it opened in 1930, some 70,000 people attended the event. While it was partly destroyed in the German bombing of Rotterdam in May 1940 during the Nazi invasion of the Netherlands, numerous photographs, plans and other material documenting the structure's design and the structure have survived and recently aided in the production of a Dutch documentary on Dudok's department store.

Dudok received the RIBA Gold Medal in 1935 and the AIA Gold Medal in 1955. He also designed the Collège néerlandais in the Cité Universitaire in Paris, a cultural centre in Baghdad and a cinema in Calcutta. One of the buildings he designed in Rotterdam now houses a cafe-restaurant named after him. He drew up plans for the rebuilding of The Hague after WW2. This involved a new district for 150,000 people in the southwest of the city. He died, aged 89, in Hilversum.

== Works (selection) ==
- City Hall, Hilversum, 1928–1931
- De Bijenkorf department store, Rotterdam, 1930 (destroyed during World War II)
- Monument on Afsluitdijk, The Netherlands, 1933
- Lighthouse Cinema, Kolkata, India, 1936
- Cité Universitaire, Collège néerlandais Paris, France, 1939
- Utrecht City Theatre, Utrecht, 1941
- Exxon Gas stations, The Netherlands, 1953
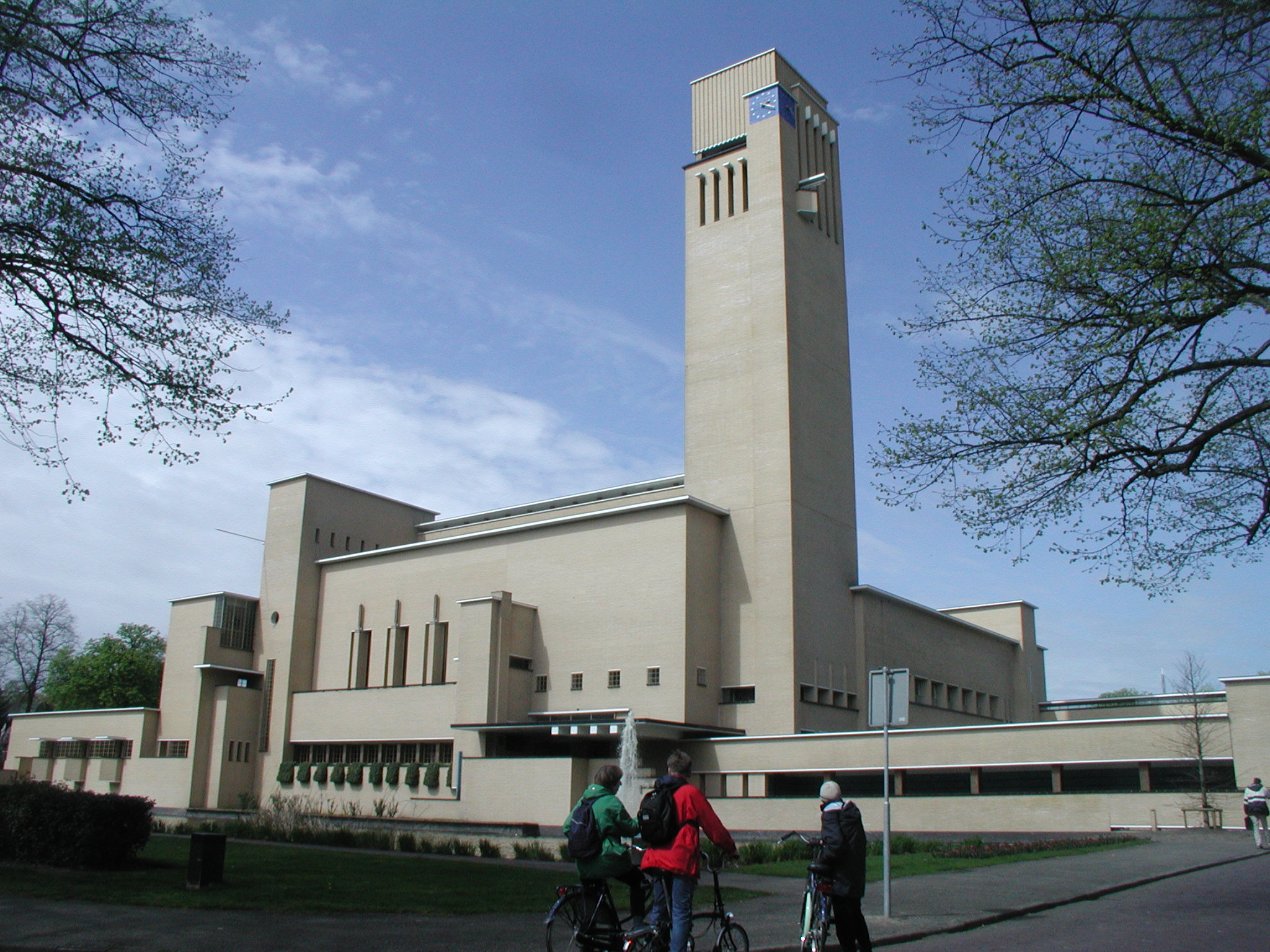
Hilversum City Hall, 1928–1931

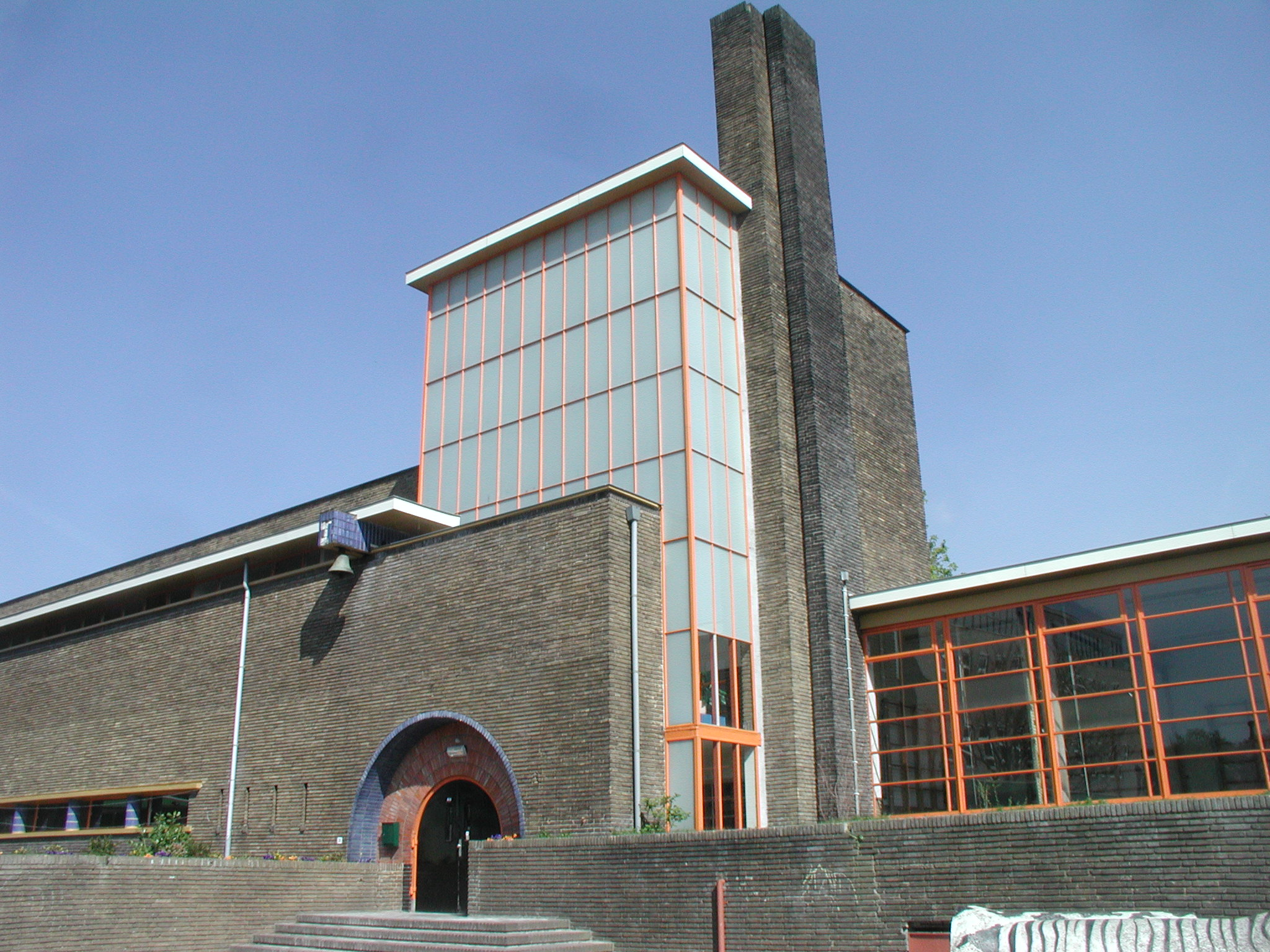
One of several Hilversum schools designed by Dudok

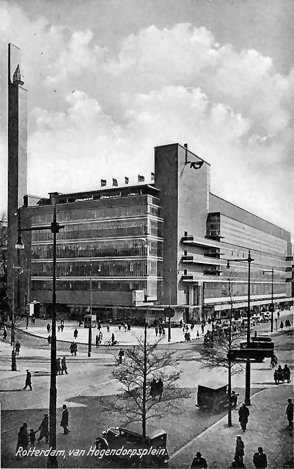
De Bijenkorf department store, Rotterdam, 1930

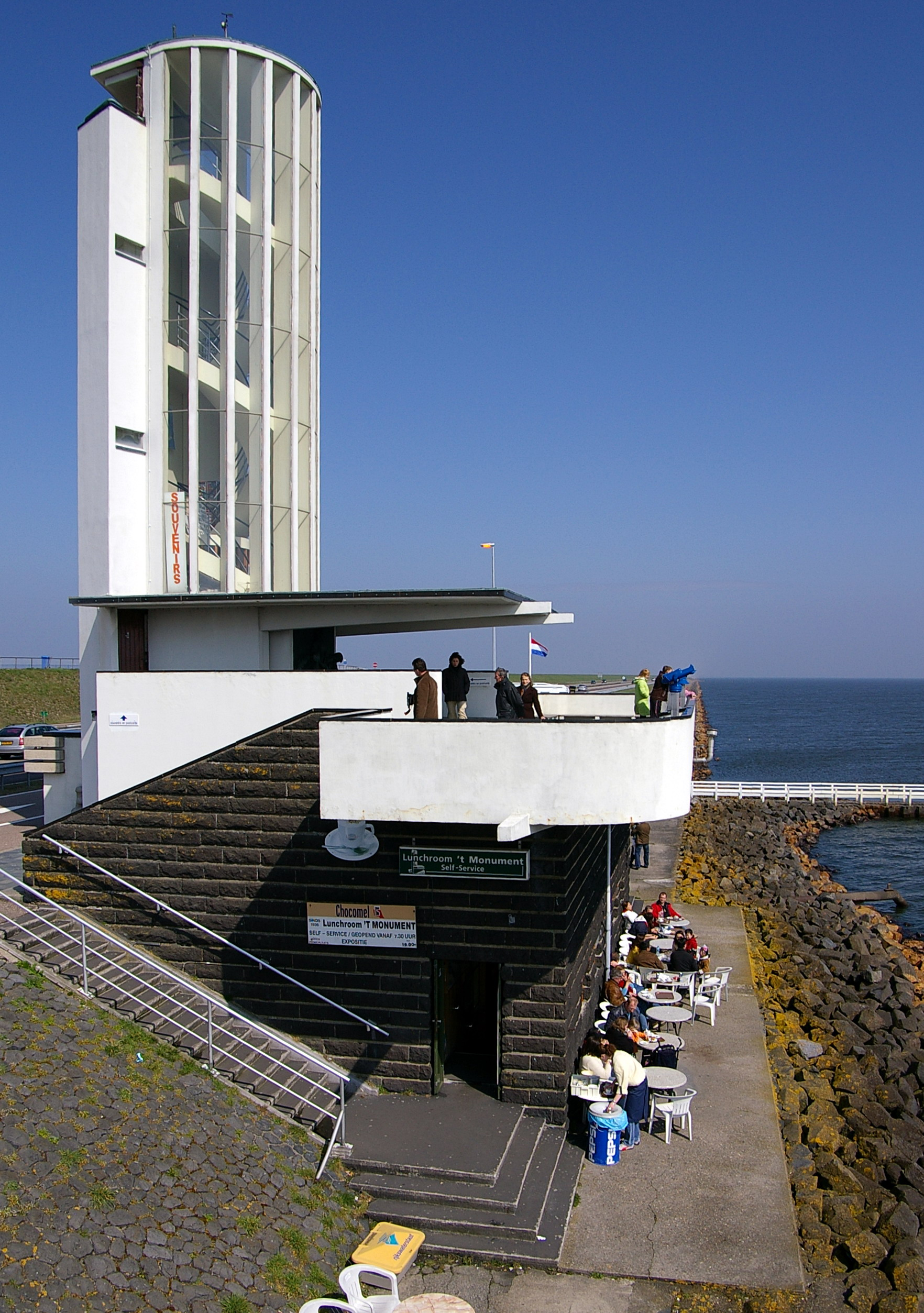
Monument on Afsluitdijk, 1933
