= Challis House =

Historic building in Sydney, Australia

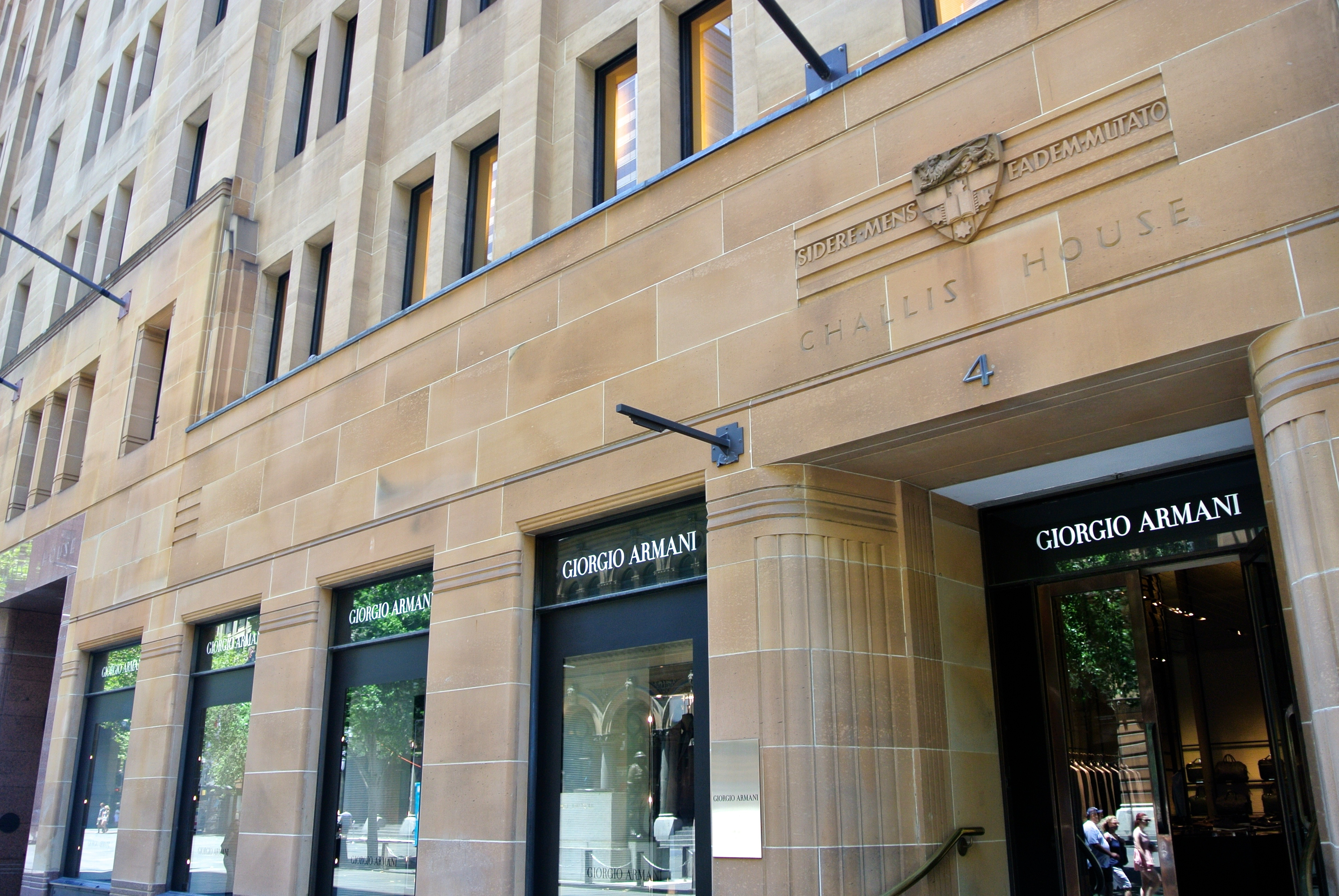
- Challis House, pictured in 2014

- Location within Sydney Location within Australia
- 33.8673°S 151.2078°E
- Location: 4–10 Martin Place, Sydney central business district, City of Sydney, New South Wales, Australia

History
- Built: 1906–1907, 1936, 1973
- Built for: The University of Sydney

Site notes
- Architects: Robertson and Marks with Walter Liberty Vernon (1906–1907); Hennessey and Hennessey (1936); Edmund-Dykes, Coward and Chaplin (1973)
- Architectural style: Art Deco

New South Wales Heritage Register
- Official name: Challis House
- Type: State heritage (built)
- Designated: 2 April 1999
- Reference no.: 666
- Type: Commercial Office/Building
- Category: Commercial

Challis House is a heritage-listed commercial building located at 4–10 Martin Place in the Sydney central business district, in the City of Sydney local government area of New South Wales, Australia. The property was added to the New South Wales State Heritage Register on 2 April 1999.

== History ==
Challis House is located on land resumed by the Government in 1889 from W. H. Paling and the estates of Thomas Perkins and Thomas Holt as part of the scheme to establish an important public street to the north of the GPO, from Pitt to George Streets between Hunter and King Streets. Holt's land, to the east of the Tank Stream, had originally been granted to John Connell, a free settler in 1837. Connell had leased the land prior to the grant. Perkins' and Palings' land was located to the west of the Tank Stream. In 1807 the major portion of this area was under lease to William Jameson with the remainder vacant. By 1834 this area was owned by James Chisholm and Hugh MacDonald. By the 1870s the land was owned by Thomas Perkins.

The original building was constructed by Sydney University in 1906-7 under the supervision of Messers. Robertson and Marks with Walter Liberty Vernon, the NSW Government Architect, using funds from the Challis Bequest.

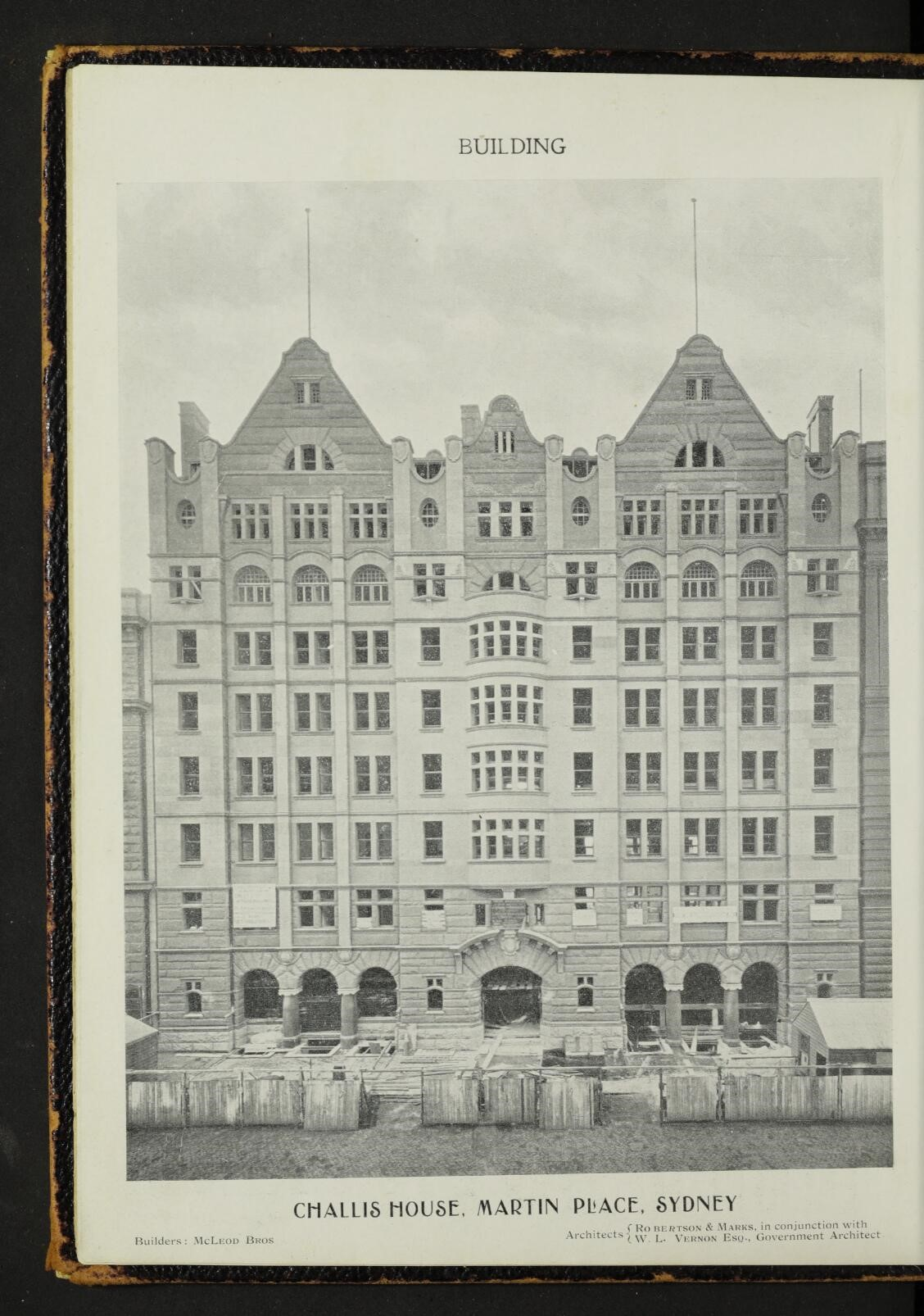
Challis house 1907- under construction

John Henry Challis (1806–1880), an English born merchant and philanthropist left a bequest of £276,000 to The University of Sydney. Upon construction, the building immediately assumed the function of a commercial city building that was closely linked with tourism due to the occupants of the lower floors being the Railways Ticketing Office and Government Tourist Bureau. In 1912, an additional room was constructed for the caretaker. The place was virtually reconstructed in 1936, with Hennessey and Hennessey appointed as architects, resulting a completely different facade, repaired in 1963 and refurbished in 1973, when the place underwent major redevelopment under the supervision of Edmund-Dykes, Coward and Chaplin. The building was internally gutted except for the elevators and fire stairs. Air conditioning was installed and a shopping arcade established in the former railway ticket offices fronting the plaza with a restaurant below the arcade.

== Description ==
Challis House is a 12/13 storey reinforced concrete framed structure with 1930s Art Deco style sandstone facades above a polished red granite base to Martin Place and Angel Place with, a bronze coloured mansard roof behind a parapet, and a loft tower to the eastern end. There are symmetrical, slightly recessed bays for floors 1–9 with large shopfront windows with bronze panels below to the ground floor. Windows to the upper floors are bronze coloured anodized aluminium framed.

The building is predominantly used for office space above ground floor level with retail travel offices and shops on the ground floor and a cocktail bar/nightclub in the basement. The building has the appearance of a 1990s interior refurbishment with some areas exhibiting even more recent fit outs. The original Challis House had a lower ground floor (below pavement level) in the eastern half of the building with a sub-basement below. The west side of the building had only a basement area (untenanted) below pavement level. When the building was reconstructed in 1936 it was increased in height, the structural framework was completely removed and replaced and the appearance of the building was totally altered. The present building exterior and structure essentially dates from 1937 although there are some elements that date from 1907. The 1974 internal refurbishment has removed all visible traces of the 1937 reconstruction. Since 1937, the most obvious external change to the building has been the addition of the mansard roof, although removal of the awning to the central entrance at ground level (to Martin Place), removal of original doors and window spandrels and the addition of new entrance steps.

As of December 2018 Giorgio Armani was a ground-floor tenant in the building.

== Heritage listing ==
As at 7 February 2005, Challis House has historic and aesthetic significance at a State level.

The facades of Challis House are good examples of restrained 1930s architectural Art Deco design. The elevation to Martin Place in particular has exceptional significance by virtue of the contribution it makes to this important "civic" precinct in terms of its sensitive scale, sympathetic sandstone, granite and bronze materials and complementary fenestration to the other nearby 19th Century and early 20th Century buildings. The 1937 rebuilding of Challis House signifies a major reconstruction period of many buildings in the Martin Place precinct. The skilful incorporation of a major part of the original 1907 Challis House facades into the present building is probably unique in New South Wales; technologically it was a significant achievement for its day. The height of the masonry facade reflects the 1938 prevailing building height limit of 45 metres (148 ft); Challis House was then aligned with the adjacent City Mutual Life Assurance Building, the nearby Bank of New South Wales and Commercial Banking Company former bank head office buildings in George Street. Since 1907 the name Challis House has referred to a building on this site that has been synonymous with Overseas, Australian and New South Wales travel activities. The building and its name has an important association with John Henry Challis and Sydney University; Challis House commemorates the bequest of that body. In its previous and present form the building has served as a backdrop for many important celebrations and has often been accordingly decorated. Since the establishment of the Sydney Cenotaph in 1928 has provided a suitable setting for the national ceremonies conducted immediately in front.

Challis House was listed on the New South Wales State Heritage Register on 2 April 1999.

== See also ==
- Australian non-residential architectural styles
- List of Art Deco buildings in Sydney
- University of Sydney
