= Australian Legion of Ex-Servicemen and Women =

The Australian Legion of Ex-Servicemen and Women is an ex-service association. Formed in December 1944 from a number of existing organisations, membership of the legion is open to all ex-service personnel, including British Commonwealth and Allied personnel, and former members of the peacetime Australian regular and reserve forces. The legion has branches in each state, and sub-branches in major cities and towns, with its national headquarters located in Melbourne. The National Council meets annually and makes submissions to government on matters affecting the ex-service community, while other activities include welfare and social events, as well as assisting with compensation and benefit claims.

== History ==
=== Early decades ===
Formed in 1926, the Association of Returned Sailors and Soldiers' Clubs of New South Wales, later that year the Association of Returned Sailors and Soldiers' Clubs (though still a NSW organization), as a peak body to represent the hundreds of ex-servicemen's clubs scattered throughout the State. It was primarily concerned with matters affecting the lives of veterans of The Great War, such as pensions, employment, health care and housing. One of its first, and most enduring, innovations was the installation of a "Lamp of Remembrance" in each club to commemorate fallen soldiers.

Office holders in 1926 were B. L. Smith, president; J. H. Cask, hon. secretary; H. E. Lording, treasurer; vice-president Willingham, and councillors Hart and Rushbrooke. Ernest Alfred Rushbrooke (c. 1897 – September 1952) was hon. secretary 1927–1935. In 1927 W. Kennedy was elected president, D. Willingham and J. Morris vice-presidents, J. H. Cask hon. secretary and E. Rushbrooke his assistant; R. Lording hon. treasurer; and councillors W. McInnes and J. Paterson. A later reference had that year's officers G. W. Patterson as president; E. A. Rushbrooke secretary; and J. S. Davidson treasurer.

In 1927 the association organised the dedication ceremony for the newly erected Cenotaph in Martin Place, Sydney

On 25 April 1928 at 4:30 a.m. a representative group from the Association laid a wreath on the Cenotaph, commemorating the time and date of the First Australian Imperial Force landing at Gallipoli, long recognised as Anzac Day. From this act of remembrance the Anzac Day "Dawn Pilgrimage", later Dawn Service, evolved.

In 1929 the Association became The Australian Legion of Ex-Servicemen's Clubs, following the titles of similar organizations in Britain, France and America, and initiated the Anzac Day Dawn Service (as "Dawn Pilgrimage") in Sydney at the cenotaph. The assembly of Units and procession to The Domain was organised quite separately by the Returned & Services League of Australia.

In 1932 it decided to affiliate with the League of Nations Union and protested the cut in War Service pensions.

In 1933 the Legion introduced hymns into the service, and for the first time a public address system was employed.

=== Later history ===
The Board of Returned & Services League of Australia (RSL) New South Wales approved the merger of the Australian Legion of Ex-Servicemen & Women and RSL NSW with effect from 27 September 2022 and welcomed all members of the Australian Legion to the RSL. The Coogee, Cootamundra, Eastern Suburbs, Orange, Riverwood, and Willoughby Legion sub-branches became chapters of the RSL's Coogee-Randwick-Clovelly, Cootamundra, Bondi Junction-Waverley, City of Orange, Penshurst and Willoughby sub-branches. The merger of the Legion was in keeping with RSL NSW's approach when other ex-service organisations were unable to maintain their membership.

- Dennis, Peter; Grey, Jeffrey; Morris, Ewan; Prior, Robin; Bou, Jean (2008). The Oxford Companion to Australian Military History (Second ed.). Melbourne, Victoria: Oxford University Press. ISBN 9780195517842.
