= 341 George Street, Sydney =

Heritage-listed building in Sydney, Australia

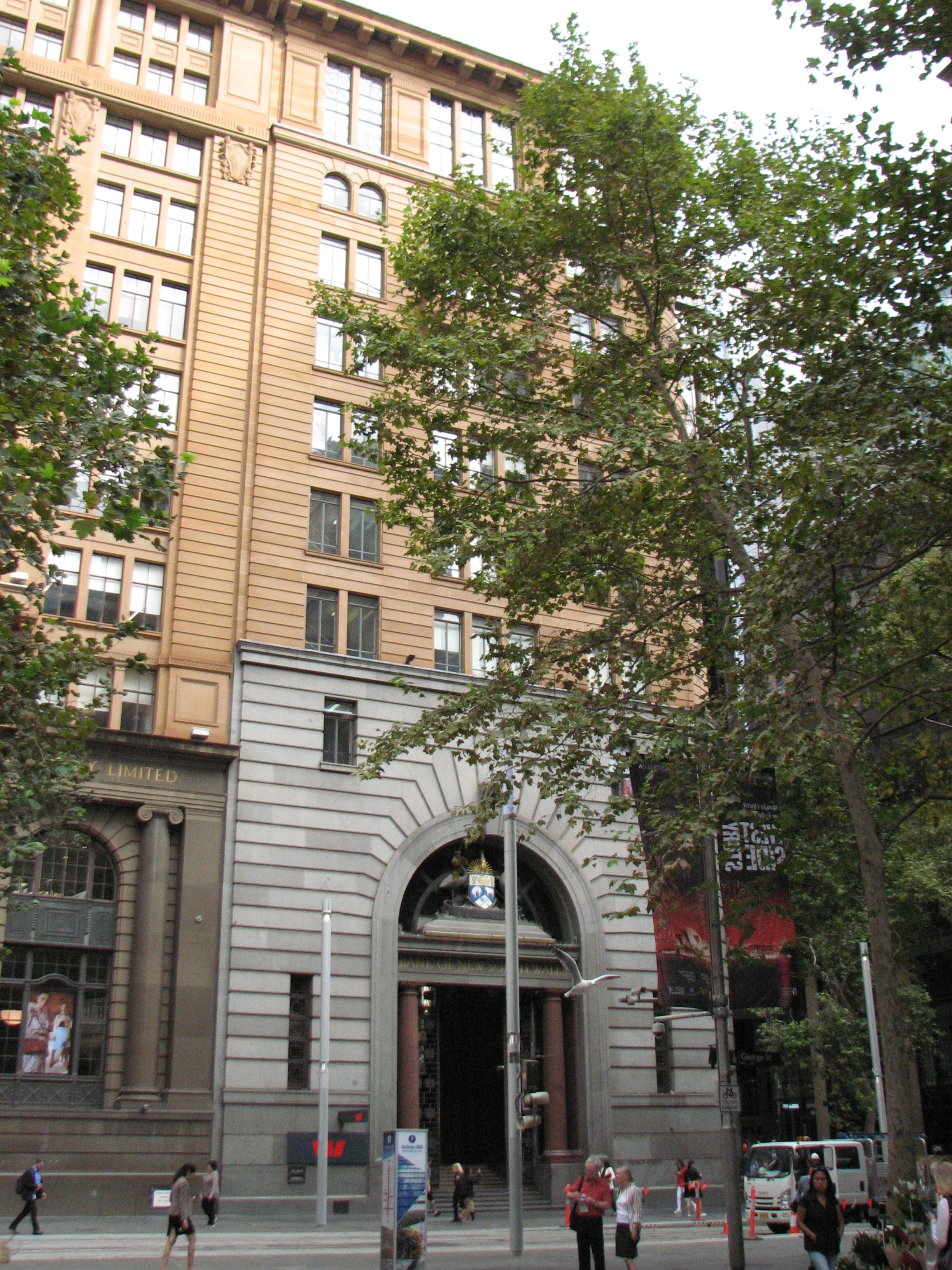
- Westpac Bank, 341 George Street Sydney

- Location within Sydney Location within Australia
- 33.8673°S 151.2066°E
- Location: 341 George Street, Sydney central business district, City of Sydney, New South Wales, Australia

History
- Built: 1927–1932

Site notes
- Architect(s): Robertson & Marks

New South Wales Heritage Register
- Official name: Westpac Bank; Bank of NSW
- Type: State heritage (built)
- Designated: 2 April 1999
- Reference no.: 664
- Type: Bank
- Category: Commercial
- Builders: Howie Moffat and Co. Ltd

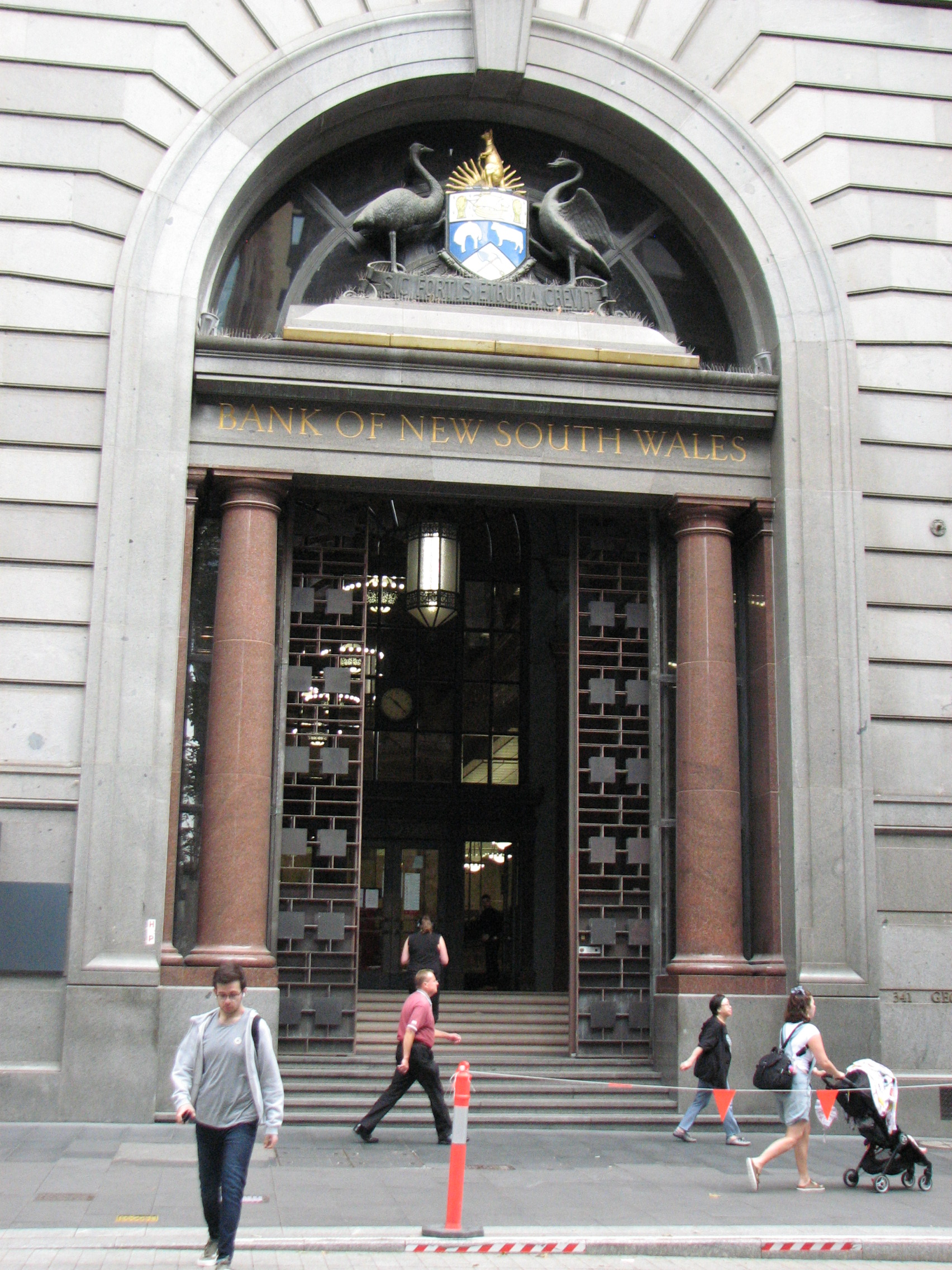
Entrance to 341 George Street Sydney

341 George Street, Sydney is a heritage-listed bank building located at 341 George Street, in the Sydney central business district, in the City of Sydney local government area of New South Wales, Australia. It was built from 1927 to 1932 and housed the headquarters of the Bank of New South Wales, and later Westpac. It is also known as Westpac Bank building and Bank of NSW building. Westpac sold the building in 2002, but continues to lease the lower floors for use as banking chambers. The upper floors are leased by other tenants.

It was added to the New South Wales State Heritage Register on 2 April 1999. The building served as the Head Office for the Bank of New South Wales until relocated to 60 Martin Place in 1970.

== History ==
The land containing the subject site was originally part of the military barracks and parade ground, which occupied fifteen acres of land in this part of the city until the late 1840s. The barrack blocks stood back from George Street between York and Clarence streets. There were gates on the four sides of the walls, the main gate, with guardhouse, was in George Street. The pubs, eating houses and brothels were close at hand in nearby streets. The wives of the soldiers lived just behind the barracks in rows of wooden huts in what is now Clarence Street.

The Imperial Regiment occupied the site until 1847, when the troops marched out of the George Street Barracks for the last time to their newly built military barracks in Paddington. The old buildings were demolished and materials of the dismantled barracks sold at a public auction in 1851. The land was subdivided and the present network of streets laid out extending York Street to Margaret Street and beyond. Between 1850 and 1853 the valuable land was sold at between forty and eighty pounds a square foot. For decades the barracks constrained the development of the area for general commercial purposes. Rapidly leading merchants and private capitalists established first-class boarding-houses, warehouses and a number of "expensively-constructed and highly-ornamental business places" were built. The area became an area of considerable mercantile importance.

On 13 July 1850 two allotments (6 and 7 perches) of the old barracks site were purchased at the corner Wynyard and George Streets in preparation for the building of a new Head Office for the Bank of New South Wales.

=== Bank of New South Wales ===
The Bank of New South Wales was founded in 1817, under Royal Charter, aided by a number of principal commercial men of that time, who had come to the conclusion that a local financial institution was necessary to facilitate the transactions of the ever-growing trade of the young colony. It later became Australia's first company in 1856.

=== Development of the site ===
The first Bank of New South Wales building on the site was occupied in February 1853; the building was at that stage still only partially completed. By 1860 more space was required. Between the Bank and the rival Commercial Banking Company of Sydney at 343 George Street were two shops belonging to A. Moses. After long negotiation in 1862 the Bank finally purchased one of these shops for £10,500. Later the Commercial Banking Company purchased the other shop, making them neighbours occupying the whole block on George Street. The Bank of NSW was then extended giving an additional 7 metres (24 ft) exposure on this frontage. The enlarged premises sufficed for about ten years. The further growth of the Bank's business due to the gold rushes in Victoria and New South Wales necessitated still further space. In 1876 adjoining premises in Wynyard Street (known as lots 7, 8 & 9 with three storey commercial building located on them) were purchased for a total of £25,000.

By the late 1880s there had been many other developments in the vicinity of the Bank such as the construction of the new GPO and the erection of David Jones' new four-storey building (no longer standing) and the expansion of the CBC Bank adjacent on George Street. Business continued to expand and just before World War I, the Bank's premises once again began to feel cramped.

According to Board minutes, in 1913 the Board was considering the erection of a new high-rise building on the George Street site to exploit its prominent position and to take advantage of the newly increased 150 feet construction height limit. The Bank purchased three adjoining sites on Wynyard Street (lots 10, 11 & 12, occupied by three-storey commercial buildings). However matters such as further extension were forgotten in the events of 1914–1918. In the course of the War no fewer than 40% of the Bank's make staff were enlisted in the services. Further development was also delayed by the problems of the post-war years. The purchased buildings were used by various Red Cross shops and depots until the mid 1920s.

==== Construction of the New Building 1927–1932 ====
Board Minutes, held by the Westpac Archives, provides ample information about the erection of the Head Office premises at 341 George Street. In May 1925 the Board resolved that a new Head Office should be built. The Commercial Banking Company (CBC) of Sydney had then reached the final stages of its own Head Office, and the Bank of NSW Board resolved that the new building should be of the same height as its neighbour and the floors should be on the same level. In July 1925 architects Robertson & Marks were engaged to supply sketch plans. Over the course of the design and construction the architects were asked to investigate the possibility of reducing the number of necessary columns in the main Banking Chamber. Robertson & Marks developed an unusual proposal of storey-height girder trusses at first floor level and at the sixth floor to carry the weight of the building over the main public spaces. As a result of this alteration, approved on 16 August 1927, only two groups of four columns were necessary for the entire ground floor area.

The building was erected in two stages to allow banking operations to continue. Demolition of the western section of the old premises commenced on 27 August 1927. In January 1930 the rear portion of the building was sufficiently completed to allow occupation.

When the building was nearing completion, it received criticism from architects on the grounds that it clashed with the adjacent CBC building. An article in the Sunday Guardian on 14 June 1931 quoted critical comments of leading authorities such as Professor Leslie Wilkinson of the Architecture Faculty of the University of Sydney. Wilkinson described the combinations as "one of the most clashing things [I have] ever seen". It was suggested that the Bank of New South Wales had "an idea of making its entrance look like the entrance to both buildings". Many other commentators also criticised the mismatching elevations.

In March 1932 the new premises were fully occupied, only a few minor matters remained to be adjusted. The official opening was held on Saturday 19 March 1932 – the same day as the Sydney Harbour Bridge opened. In 1934 the Bank purchased more and land fronting Wynyard and York Streets but did not build on the area.

==== The architects ====
The association of the firm of Robertson & Marks with the Bank of NSW and its Head Office at 341 George Street commenced in 1904 when the firm's architects designed and supervised the alterations and additions to the old building. This date marked the beginning of a long association with the site for the architectural firm. With the exception of work undertaken by the Bank's own Premises Department, the majority of partitioning, alteration and renovation work has continued to be done by Robertson & Marks Pty Ltd until the present day. Robertson & Marks is one of the oldest architectural firm's continuous practices in Sydney.

The partnership of George Birell Robertson and Theodore John Marks was formed in 1892. In the following decades the firm became one of the most prestigious architectural offices in Sydney. Robertson & Marks become known as one of the best exponents of Richardson's American Romanesque in Sydney and played a dominant part in the evolution of the Federation Warehouse style. Robertson was president of the Institution of Architects until his early death in 1913. His son, Stuart Robertson had followed his father into the practice of architecture and by the 1910s has established himself in the partnership and the practice continued.

The design of the Head Office of the Bank of NSW seems to have been a challenging project. Apparently, the Bank preferred an external image of restraint and responsibility with the grandeur and richness confined to the inside of building. The office building was also a business proposition, and the owners looked for a fair return on their investment. The upper levels were designed for tenancies and a high yield of "letting areas" in relation to general service areas such as light wells and toilets. The building was highly regarded when completed and attracted many high-profile prestigious tenants including the United States Consulate.

==== The builders ====
The building firm of Howie Moffat and Co. Ltd were the successful tenderers. The firm had been established around the early 1880s by Archibald Howie, a stonemason, born in Glasgow, Scotland, soon after his arrival to Sydney. Archibald junior joined his father's business at 16, in 1895. By 1918 the company, Howie, Moffat & Co. Ltd won many prestigious and lucrative contracts. Among the buildings erected by the firm are the Mitchell Library, the Art Gallery, the Long Bay penitentiary and the fortification at Middle and South Head.

On the death of his father in 1932 Archibald Howie became chairman of the company and director of numerous companies connected with the building industry. In 1927 he was elected president of the Master Builders' Association of NSW.

The building firm of Howie Moffat and Co. Ltd. had a long association with the architectural firm of Robertson & Marks having had some important joint projects such as the Farmer and Company/Grace Brothers building in George Street (erected in two stages, the first in 1929–1930, and the second in 1956).

=== Recent developments ===
Originally the Bank occupied only the lower floors and the 9th floor which was used for staff facilities. The upper office floors were occupied by a series of tenants. The building was designed to accommodate tenants by providing two entrances outside the main banking chamber. Tenants in the early years included Peddle Thorp & Walker, architects, Stephen Jacques & Stephen, lawyers, Australian Portland Cement, Australian Security Ltd, The Trade Commissioner of France and the Metal Trades Employers Association. The United States Consulate rented premises in the building from the 1930s to 1970. During the World War II, U.S. General Douglas Macarthur used the Board Room for staff meetings. According to notes in the Westpac Archives it was also the scene of an occasional Court Martial.

In 1949 the Bank entered a field which was previously under the monopoly of government owned institutions, Savings Bank operations. This led to an expansion in the Bank's operations and they began to fill more floors of the 341 George Street building. A series of building applications for minor internal changes to the leased floors record the progressive modification that the building underwent. These included altering the partitions and office subdivisions on many of the floors. In the 1950s the Bank's expanded operations lead to the demolition of the former caretaker's flat on the eighth floor to make way for more generic office spaces. In the 1960s improved services were introduced into the building on various levels through false ceilings of acoustic tiles.

The building remained the Head Office of the Bank of New South Wales until 1970, when the continued growth of the Bank has again made a larger head office building necessary. After 117 years on the site the operation moved to a newly erected high rise building, 60 Martin Place, on the corner of Macquarie Street. The last tenant, the U.S. Consulate, also found larger quarters elsewhere. The building was assigned as the Bank's biggest branch in the CBD, with nearly 400 staff and about 350 staff from the wider administration of the Bank.

In 2002 Westpac Banking Corp sold the site as part of its process of rationalising its property holdings. The Bank has recently sold many of its former branches and flagship sites, including the Bank's headquarters at 60 Martin Place, as it pursues a policy of leasing premises rather than owning them. Westpac will lease the 341 George Street site for a further three years before vacating the site.

== Heritage listing ==
As at 12 September 2008, 341 George Street has historic and aesthetic significance at a State level. The site of the former Bank of NSW Head office is historically significant as the location from 1853 to 1970 of the principal office of Australia's first and largest private bank. The building itself is associated with the period of commercial optimism that preceded the great Depression, and also with the prominent architectural firm of Robertson & Marks who have worked on the building since its construction. 341 George Street is aesthetically significance as a substantially intact example of the Inter-War Commercial Palazzo style. It contains a richly detailed banking Chamber, with original fittings, furniture and extensive finishes of marble, scagliola and pressed metal. Some key areas within the office floors of the building (Executive Floor, the Board Room, Stairways and Safe Deposit Area) have retained their original detailing and provide evidence of what were at the time of construction, state of the art office interiors.

The site is significant for its landmark qualities and together with the adjoining former CBC bank Head Office is terminates the western vista of Martin Place and forms part of the precinct of historic public and private commercial buildings near the junction of Martin Place and George Streets. The building is also significant for forming the southern enclosure to Wynyard Street Plaza.

341 George Street, Sydney was listed on the New South Wales State Heritage Register on 2 April 1999.

== See also ==
- Australian non-residential architectural styles
