= Martin Place =

Pedestrian mall in Sydney, Australia

- 'The heart of the city' 'The hub of the city'
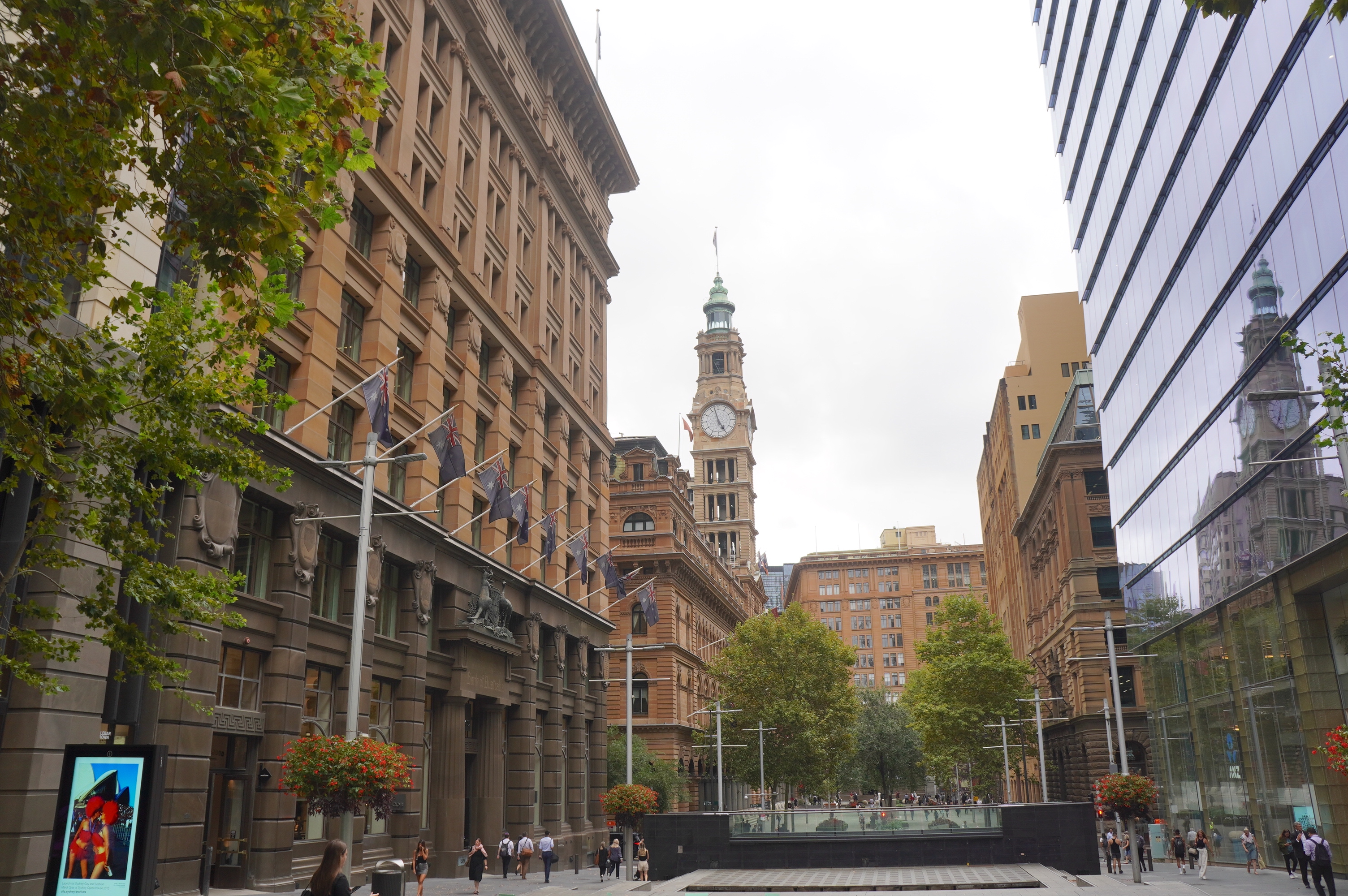
- View from Castlereagh Street
- Interactive map of Martin Place
- Former name: Moore Street
- Part of: Sydney central business district
- Namesake: Sir James Martin
- Type: Pedestrian zone
- Owner: City of Sydney
- Length: 473 m (1,552 ft)
- Location: Sydney, New South Wales, Australia
- Postal code: 2000
- Nearest metro station: Martin Place railway station Martin Place metro station
- From: Macquarie Street (east)
- Major junctions: Phillip Street; Elizabeth Street; Castlereagh Street; Pitt Street
- To: George Street (west)

Construction
- Construction start: 1890
- Completed: 1935
- Inauguration: 1892

Other
- Known for: Sydney Cenotaph; Reserve Bank of Australia; General Post Office; Lindt Cafe siege

Martin Place is a pedestrian mall in the Sydney central business district, New South Wales, Australia, which has been described as the "civic heart" of Sydney. As home to the Australian Securities Exchange, Reserve Bank of Australia, Commonwealth Bank, Macquarie Bank, Westpac, and other corporations, it is also a centre of finance and trade. Martin Place has been compared to other major financial districts such as Wall Street in New York City and the Square Mile in London. The General Post Office (GPO) is also located on Martin Place.

Martin Place has become a national Australian icon in popular culture for attracting high-end film and television productions and actors to the area. Martin Place runs between George Street and Macquarie Street, and provides entrances to the Martin Place railway station below street level. Other cross streets include Pitt Street, Castlereagh Street, Elizabeth Street and Phillip Street.

The initial "Martin Place" was the section between George Street and Pitt Street, officially opened 1892, and was named in honour of Sir James Martin, the three time Premier of New South Wales and Chief Justice of Supreme Court of New South Wales. Closed to traffic in stages from 1971, Martin Place is surrounded by many heritage buildings and features the 1927 World War I Sydney Cenotaph, water fountain, entertainment area, railway access and pedestrian seating.

== History ==
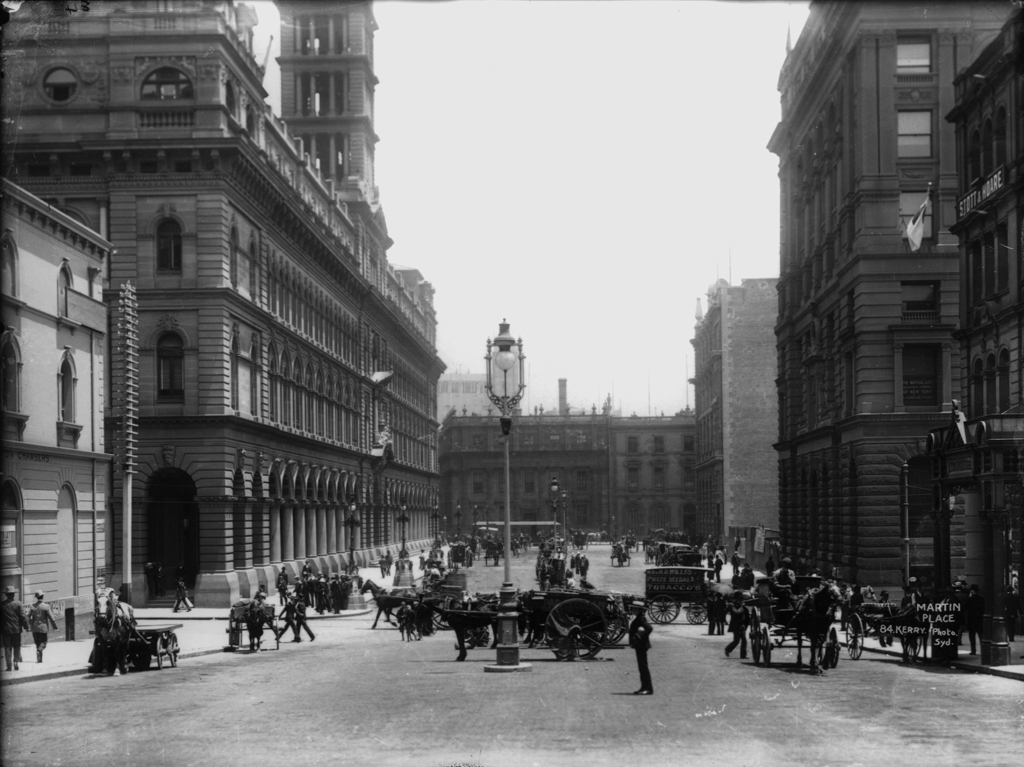
Moore Street/Martin Place circa 1900

Today's Martin Place was built in several phases. Until the late 19th century, only the section between Pitt Street and Castlereagh Street existed in anything resembling the present form, as a short street named Moore Street. Between Pitt Street and George Street there was only a small laneway (similar to nearby surviving laneways such as Angel Place or Hosking Place). In 1863, construction began on the present General Post Office Building on the south side of the laneway. The building was constructed in stages, and when the design changed to provide for a main façade on the longer north side (instead of facing George Street to the west), there were concomitant proposals to widen the existing laneway into a street connected to Moore Street. A fire which destroyed properties to the north of the laneway provided the impetus for the construction, and in 1892 (a year after the Venetian-Italianate-style General Post Office was completed) the widened street was officially opened and named "Martin Place", in honour of New South Wales premier and Chief Justice James Martin. The General Post Office occupied the entire southern frontage of the street.

Martin Place view from George Street. Resumption of Martin Place extension through to Macquarie Street, with GPO on right and fruit barrows near Cenotaph 1933

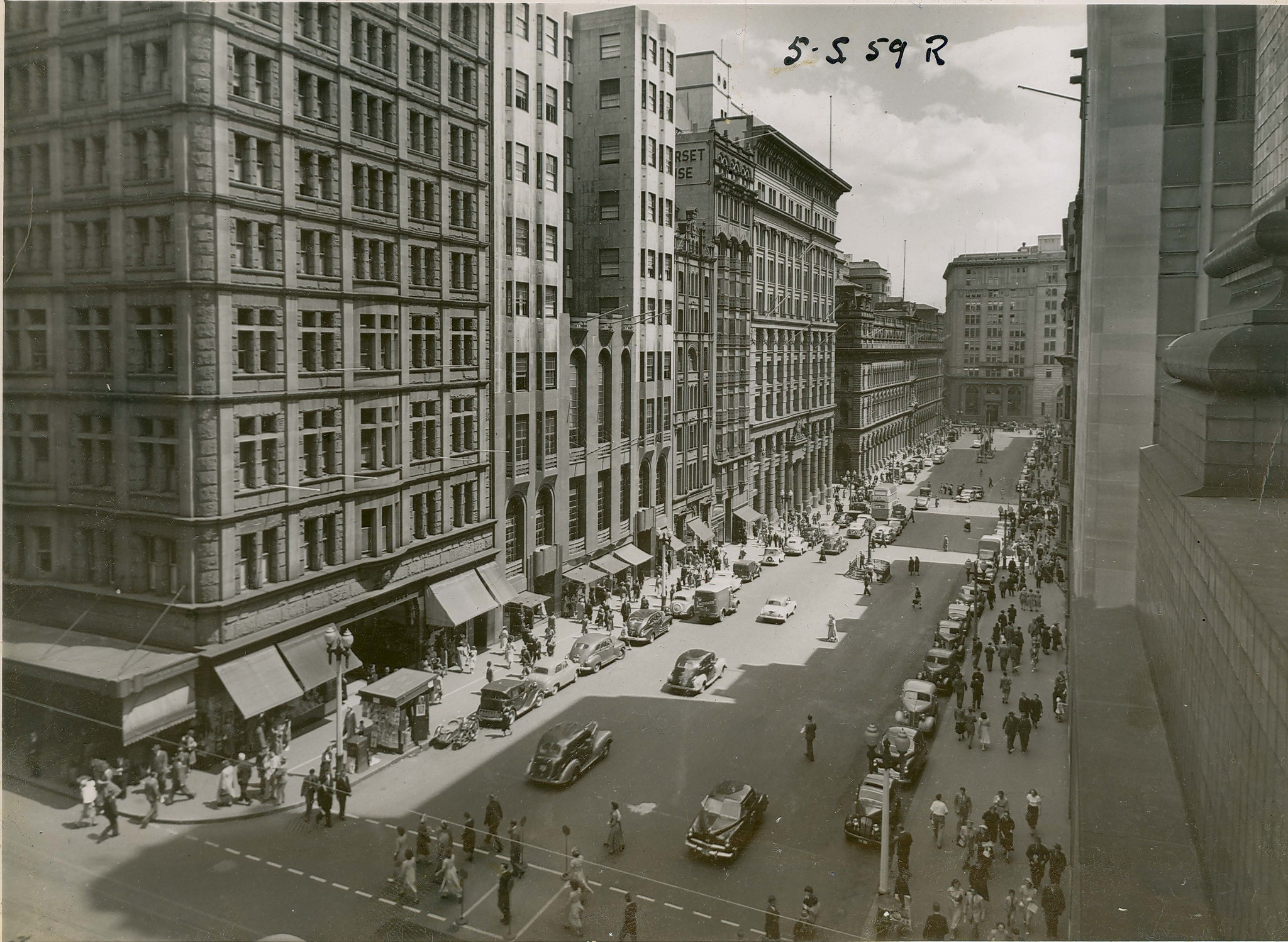
View to the west from Castlereagh Street in the 1950s showing The Australia Hotel on the left

Both Moore Street and Martin Place became prominent centres of business and finance in Sydney. In 1913, the headquarters of the Commonwealth Bank was constructed on the corner of Moore Street and Pitt Street. In later years, other banks followed with a range of impressive buildings (see "Architecture" below). In 1921, Moore Street was renamed as part of Martin Place.

Conscription rallies for World War I took place here. In 1927, a Cenotaph commemorating the WWI dead was erected. Soon after, the Sydney Municipal Council proposed to extend the street further east towards Macquarie Street. However, the plan was delayed by concerted opposition from landowners of the buildings that would have to be demolished to make way for the extension. One of the buildings demolished to make way for the extended Martin Place was St Stephen's Presbyterian Church, on the east side of Phillip Street, which was replaced by the present church on Macquarie Street in 1935. The extension was finally completed in 1935, resulting in the Martin Place stretching from George Street to Macquarie Street seen today.

=== Building demolitions ===
A number of the street's older buildings were demolished to make way for new buildings in the mid 20th Century. The most prominent of these was The Australia Hotel demolished in 1971, and replaced by the commercial office tower and retail development MLC Centre in 1977 (now known as 25 Martin Place) designed by architect Harry Seidler. In 1982 the art deco Rural Bank Building was demolished to make way for the post modern State Bank of NSW, completed in 1986.

=== Pedestrianisation ===
The increasingly important role of Martin Place as the 'heart' or 'town square' of Sydney (see "Events" below) led to calls for the street to be pedestrianised. This was undertaken progressively from 1971 until 1979, when the whole street became a pedestrian mall. During this period three properties, the ANZ bank, the National Mutual building, and the CML building, were saved from destruction after the NSW Builders Labourers Federation placed green bans to enforce National Trust preservation orders. The closure of the street to traffic was partly timed to coincide with the construction of Martin Place railway station under the eastern section of the street. Martin Place was closed between Macquarie and Phillip Streets from January 1972 to facilitate the station's construction. The station opened in 1979. Leo Port, the Lord Mayor of Sydney was an advocate of civic design, and was partly responsible for the pedestrianisation of Martin Place and Sydney Square.

== Architecture ==
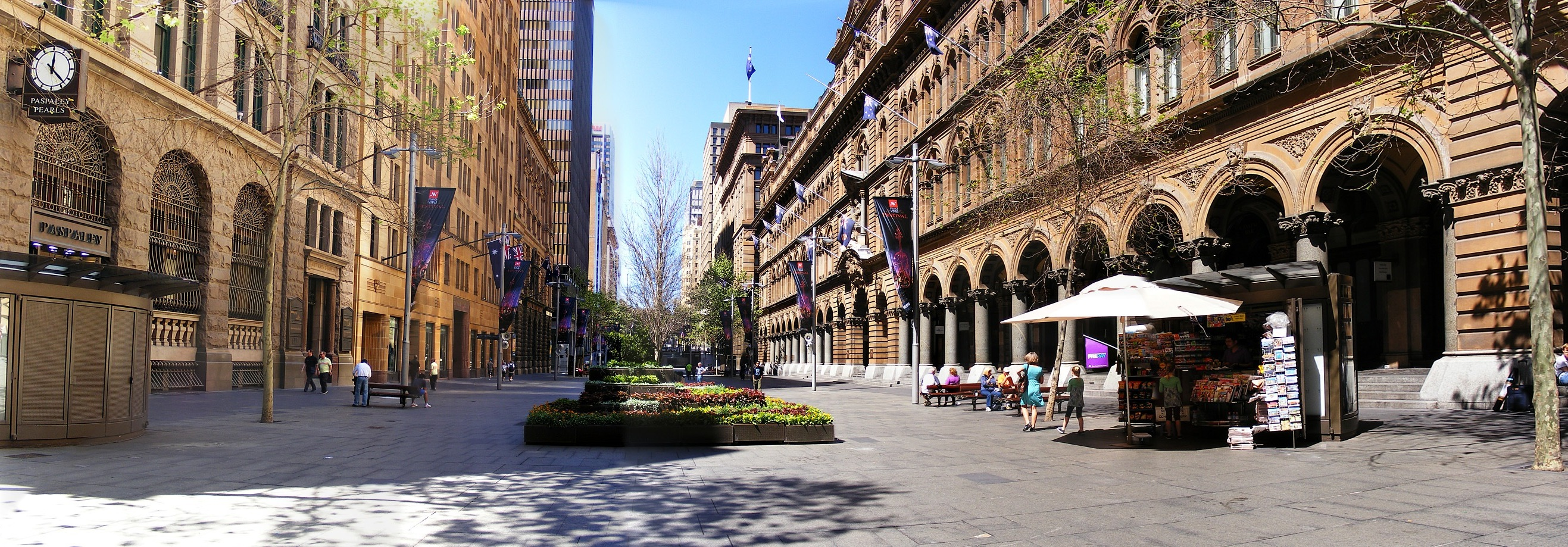
Panoramic view of the western end of Martin Place: the General Post Office (No. 1) is on the right, the Bank of Australasia Building (No. 2) and Challis House (No. 4) are on the left.

Martin Place has a large collection of buildings of various styles, from neo-classical to contemporary.

=== Notable buildings ===
Address	Building name	Image	Description	Notes
No. 1	General Post Office, Sydney		Located at the western end of Martin Place, between George and Pitt Streets. Designed by colonial architect James Barnet, this heritage-listed building was constructed in stages from 1866 to 1891. Barnet's building features a neo-classical sandstone facade, with a colonnade running around the building at street level. Above the centre of the 100-metre (330 ft) Martin Place facade is the clocktower. This building was the headquarters of the NSW postal system until 1996, when it was sold and refurbished. The building now contains shops, cafes, restaurants, and bars. The Westin hotel and Macquarie Bank office towers stand in the former courtyard, now converted into an atrium. Australia Post maintains a presence in the form of a "Post Shop" at the corner of Martin Place and George Street.	
No. 2	Bank of Australasia Building also known as 354 George Street		A heritage-listed Federation Romanesque building standing on the corner of George Street and Martin Place. The Bank of Australasia merged into ANZ in 1951. The building was saved from demolition in the early 1970s by the NSW Builders Labourers Federation who supported the National Trust by placing a green ban on it. The building has recently been refurbished and will now house retail space.	
No. 4–10	Challis House		Stands on land bought in 1906 for £500 per square foot by the University of Sydney from University endowment funds. The heritage-listed building was designed by W. L. Vernon, Government Architect and Robertson and Marks, Architects, and completed in 1907. The building was named Challis House after John Henry Challis, who in 1880 had bequeathed his estate valued at £276,000 (over $30 million in 2011) to the University. This art deco building is adorned with the Sydney University crest above the door, and forms one of the most important parts of the University's property portfolio. In 2002, the university entered a 99-year lease of the property.	
No. 5	Commonwealth Trading Bank Building (former)		Located on the corner of Martin Place and Pitt Street. Built in 1916, this 12-storey building was designed and project managed by the Sydney architectural firm, J & H.G Kirkpatrick. The building was the first, large-scale all steel-framed "skyscraper" in Australia. Known as the "Sydney Bank" within the Commonwealth Bank, it was built to be the headquarters of the Commonwealth Bank, which served at the time as Australia's central bank. It is nicknamed the "Money Box Building" due to its depiction on money boxes distributed by the Commonwealth Bank to children starting from 1922.	
No. 9	25 Martin Place (formerly MLC Centre)		Sits mainly upon the site of the Australia Hotel, demolished to make way for this 228-metre, reinforced concrete skyscraper, designed by Harry Seidler. The building is a modernist, octagonal column. At the time of its opening in (1977) it was the tallest reinforced concrete office building in the world, and was the tallest building outside North America. Construction of the building was controversial because it caused the demolition of several historic landmark buildings. Tenants include the Consulate of the United States of America.	
No. 38–46	25 Martin Place		An 11-storey art-deco heritage-listed building located on the corner of Castlereagh Street and Martin Place. It was the former headquarters of Mutual Life & Citizens Assurance Company, a large finance company taken over by the National Australia Bank in 2000. Its current principal tenant is restructuring and advisory firm, McGrathNicol. The large, red, carved letters "MLC" are still visible on the clocktower, although a clock is currently missing.	
No. 39	39 Martin Place (over Martin Place Metro Station)		Completed in 2025, 39 Martin Place is a contemporary 28-storey tower built as an over station development on the Sydney CBD Metro line and includes the southern entrances to the Martin Place Metro Station. The building was designed by Sydney based architects Tzannes with design references to the 1920s State Savings Bank Building opposite at 48 Martin Place. The building won the Australian Institute of Architects 2025 Sir Arthur G Stephenson Award for Commercial Architecture.	
No. 48–50	State Savings Bank Building		Later also owned by the Commonwealth Bank, has a distinctive terracotta and pink granite Beaux-Arts façade. It was built as the headquarters of the Government Savings Bank of NSW and opened in 1928. The interior features large scagliola columns, extensive use of marble, and a plaster and pressed metal ceiling. The building's square trading hall was originally one of the largest in the world. A stately vault is housed in the basement.	
No. 52	52 Martin Place (former State Bank Centre)		Built as the headquarters of the NSW State Bank to replace the 1936 Rural Bank Building, which was taken over by Colonial 1996 to form the Colonial State Bank, which itself was taken over in 2000 by the Commonwealth Bank. This 1986 post-modern building with its dark glass facade features a 36-storey tower atop a 2-storey atrium. The former banking chamber was home to the Seven Network's Sydney-based Seven News, Sunrise and Weekend Sunrise, mid-morning program The Morning Show as well as the other Seven News bulletins for 19 years until July 2023. Sky News Australia also has a small single camera studio facing Elizabeth Street.	
No. 53–63	Australian Provincial Assurance building		Formerly the Overseas Union Bank, this 14-storey art-deco heritage-listed building is located on the corner of Elizabeth Street and Martin Place. A former tenant was the Lindt store and café.	
No. 65	Reserve Bank of Australia Building		Located between Phillip and Macquarie Streets. This heritage-listed building houses the headquarters of the Reserve Bank of Australia, Australia's central bank, including a money museum.	
No. 60	Sixty Martin Place (former Westpac Building)		Located between Phillip Street and Macquarie Street, the building is notable for featuring cantilevered floors on the north side that extend out over the historic St Stephen's Uniting Church on Macquarie Street. The building was completed in 2019, replacing a 28-storey 1960s office block.	

=== Demolished buildings ===
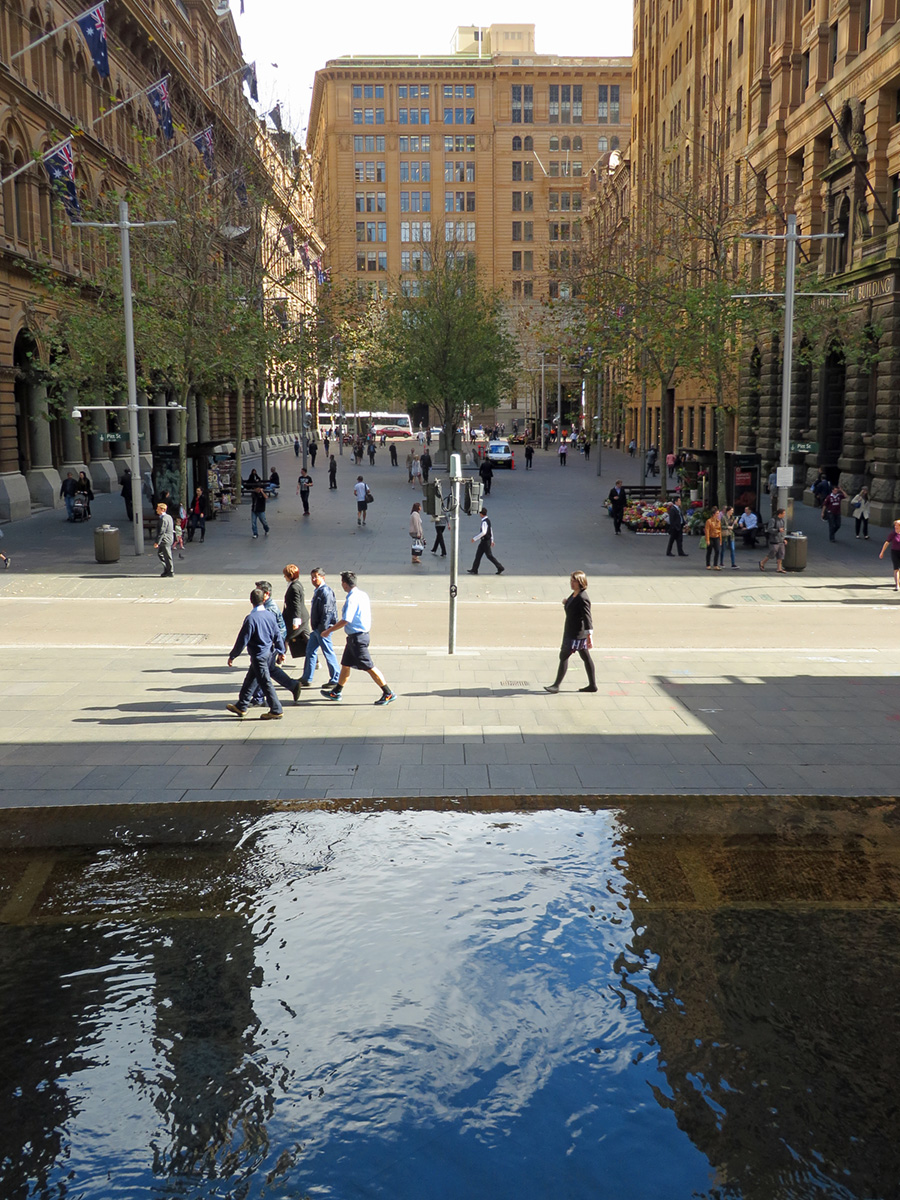
Martin Place (view west from Pitt Street towards George Street) in 2013

Several buildings located at Martin Place have been demolished:

- St. Stephen's Presbyterian Church, Phillip Street (1857—1935)
- The Australia Hotel (1891—1971)
- Commercial Travellers' Association of New South Wales building (1908—1975)
- Rural Bank Building (1936–1983)

=== Adjacent buildings ===
- At the Macquarie Street end, the Sydney Hospital.
- At the George Street end, the heritage-listed Westpac building, and the heritage-listed The Commercial Banking Company of Sydney Limited building, which currently houses a Burberry store.
- On Elizabeth Street, the Sun Building was formerly the headquarters of The Sun, an afternoon paper that ceased publication in the 1980s. This skyscraper Gothic building is one of only three buildings in Sydney in this style.
- On George Street, Société Générale House is American Romanesque in style, and originally housed the Equitable Life Assurance Society of America.

=== Other features ===
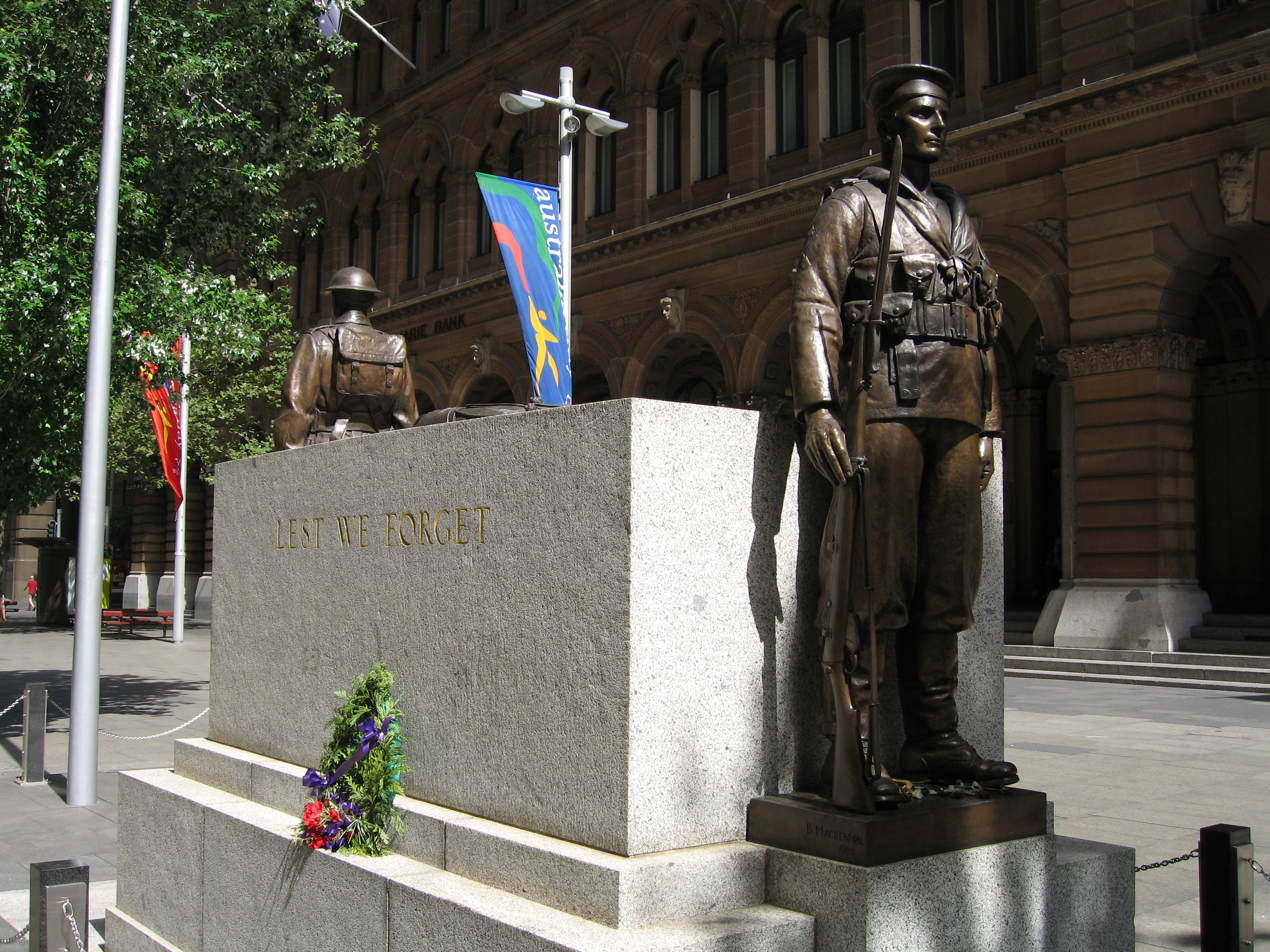
Sydney Cenotaph

Other features of Martin Place include:

- Sydney Cenotaph, located between the GPO Building and Challis House, commemorates Anzac forces who served in World War I, as well as Australians who gave their lives in subsequent conflicts. This was originally built from Moruya granite by stonemasons working on the Sydney Harbour Bridge, and dedicated on 8 August 1927.
- A water feature known as the 'Lloyd Rees Fountain' opened in December 1976 is located on the east side of Pitt Street, near the Commonwealth Bank building. Behind the fountain is an amphitheatre, which features a stage that can be mechanically raised when required for performances.
- Entrances to the underground railway station and attached plaza.
- A Commando Memorial is located in the centre of Martin Place near the eastern end. It commemorates Australian commandos who were killed during World War II.
- A statute of Sir James Martin as a boy was added on 5 November 2020 and is located in the section of Martin Place between Phillip and Macquarie Streets.

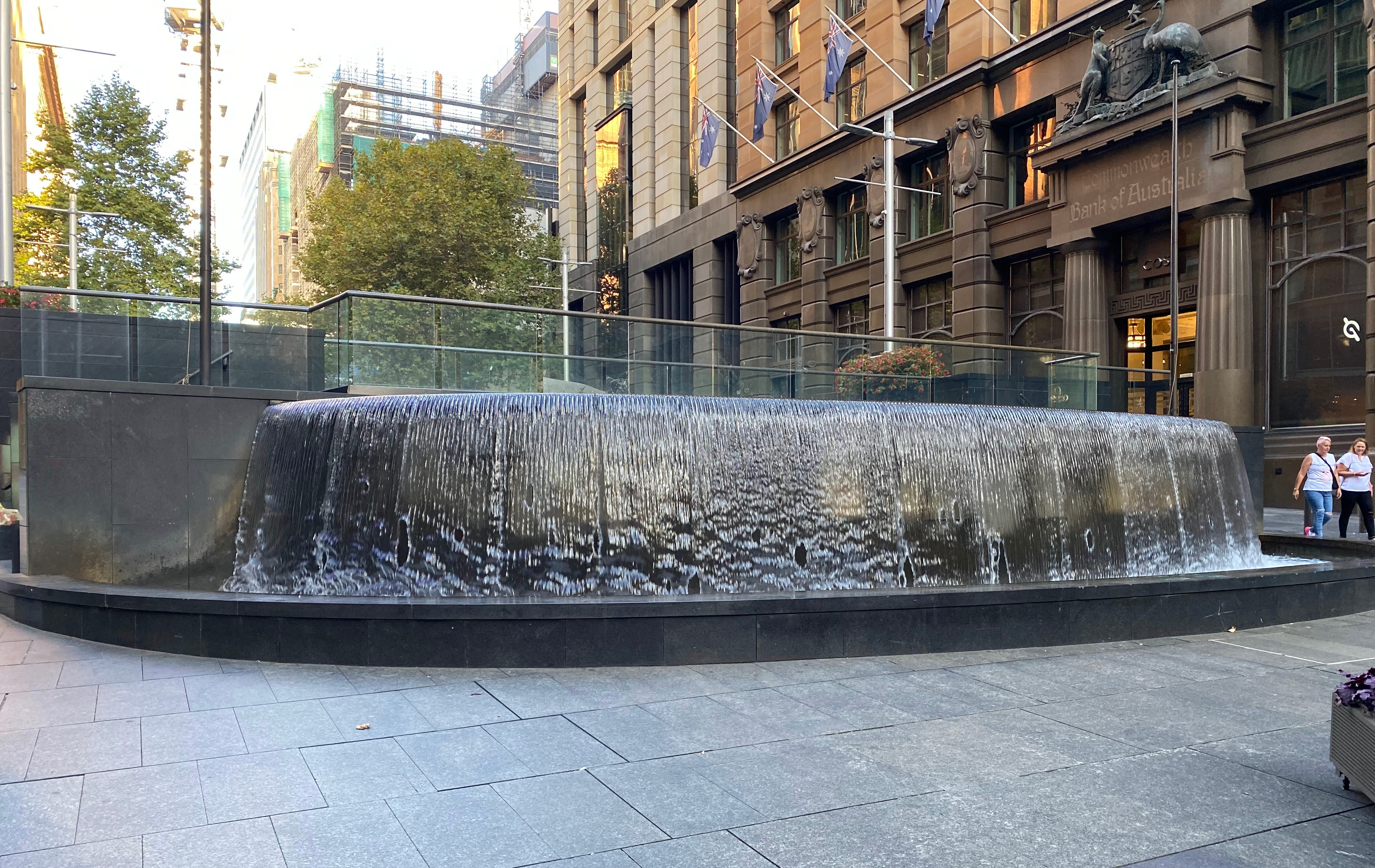
Lloyd Rees Fountain, 1976

=== Heritage listings ===
There are a number of heritage-listed buildings in Martin Place, including:

- 1 Martin Place: General Post Office, Sydney
- 4–10 Martin Place: Challis House
- 38–46 Martin Place: MLC Building
- 53–63 Martin Place: Australian Provincial Assurance Building
- 65 Martin Place: Reserve Bank of Australia Building

== Transport ==
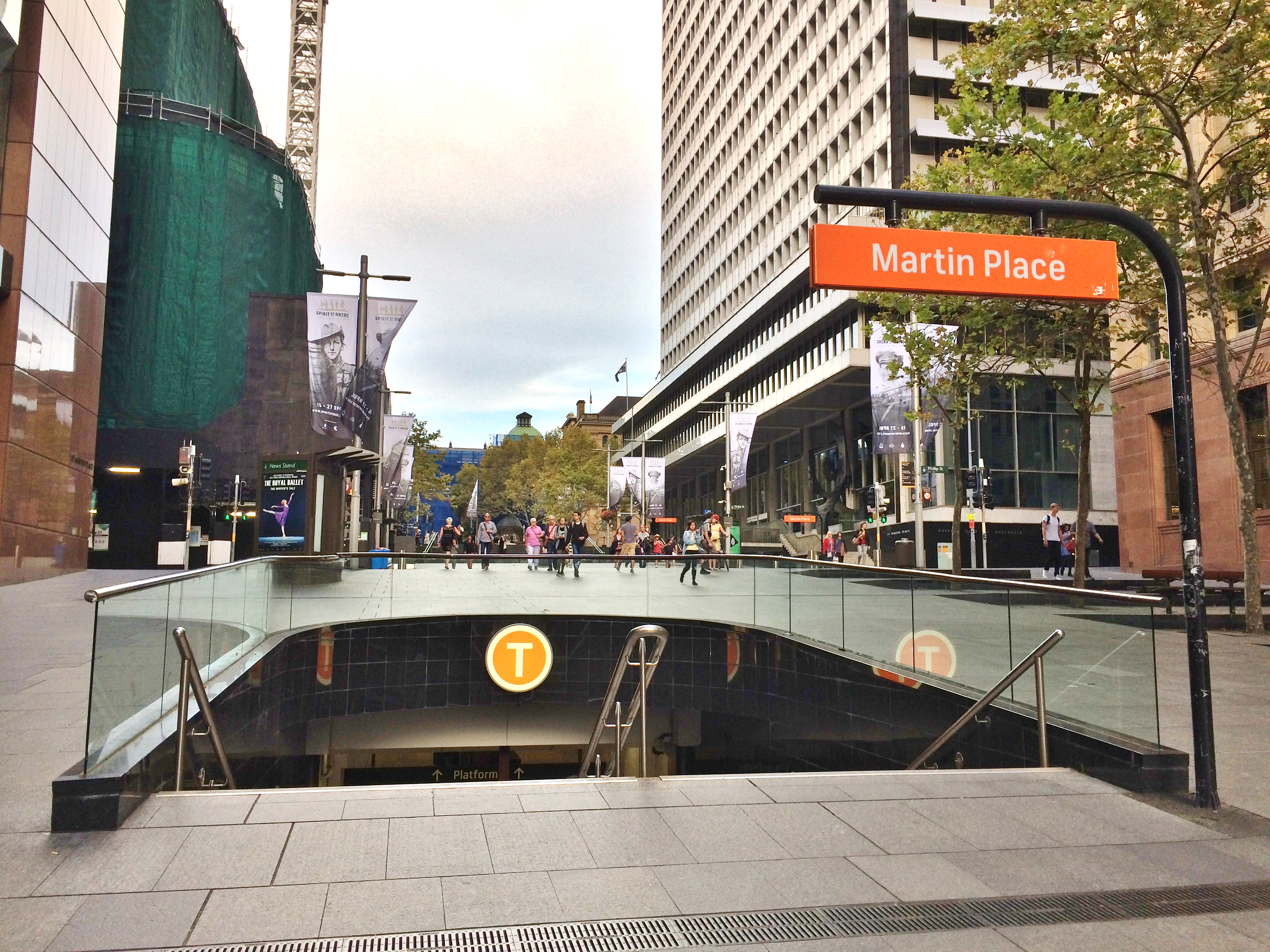
The entrance to Martin Place railway station from Elizabeth Street

George Street, Elizabeth Street, and Castlereagh Street, which cross Martin Place, are all major bus routes in Sydney's CBD. In addition, Martin Place railway station is located underground. Also nearby are St James railway station (near Macquarie Street end) and Wynyard railway station (near George Street end).

The new Sydney Metro City & Southwest line includes a Metro station located underneath the existing train station and opened in August 2024.

== Events ==
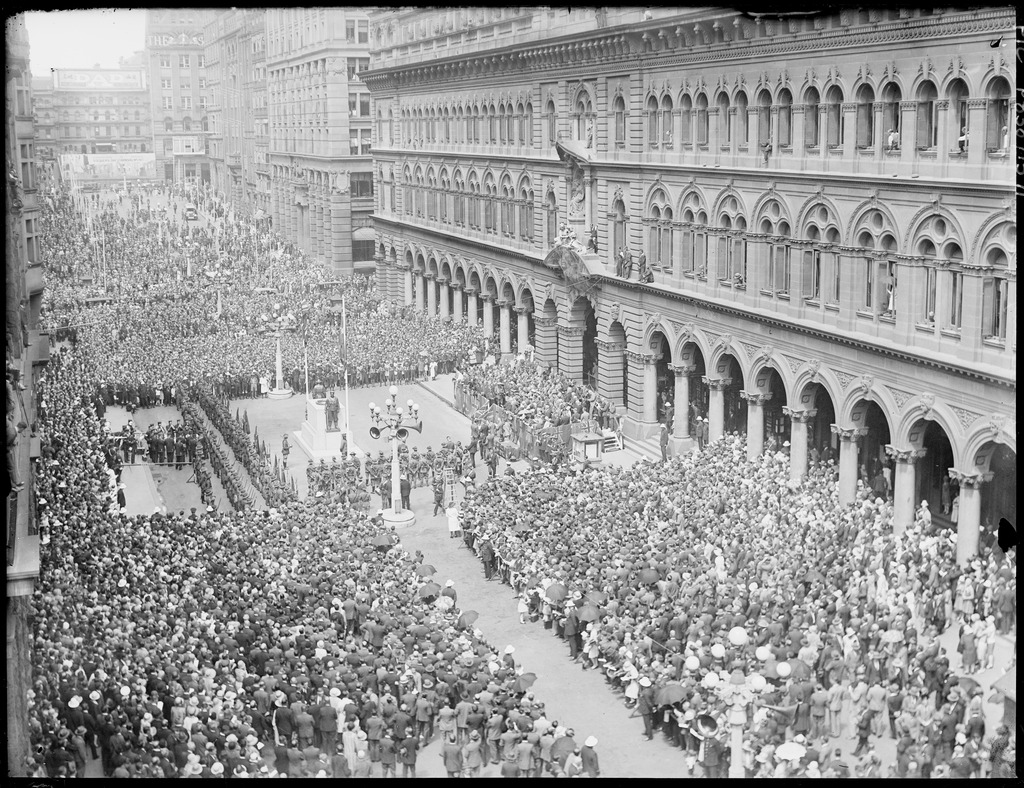
Anzac Day Parade on Martin Place in 1930

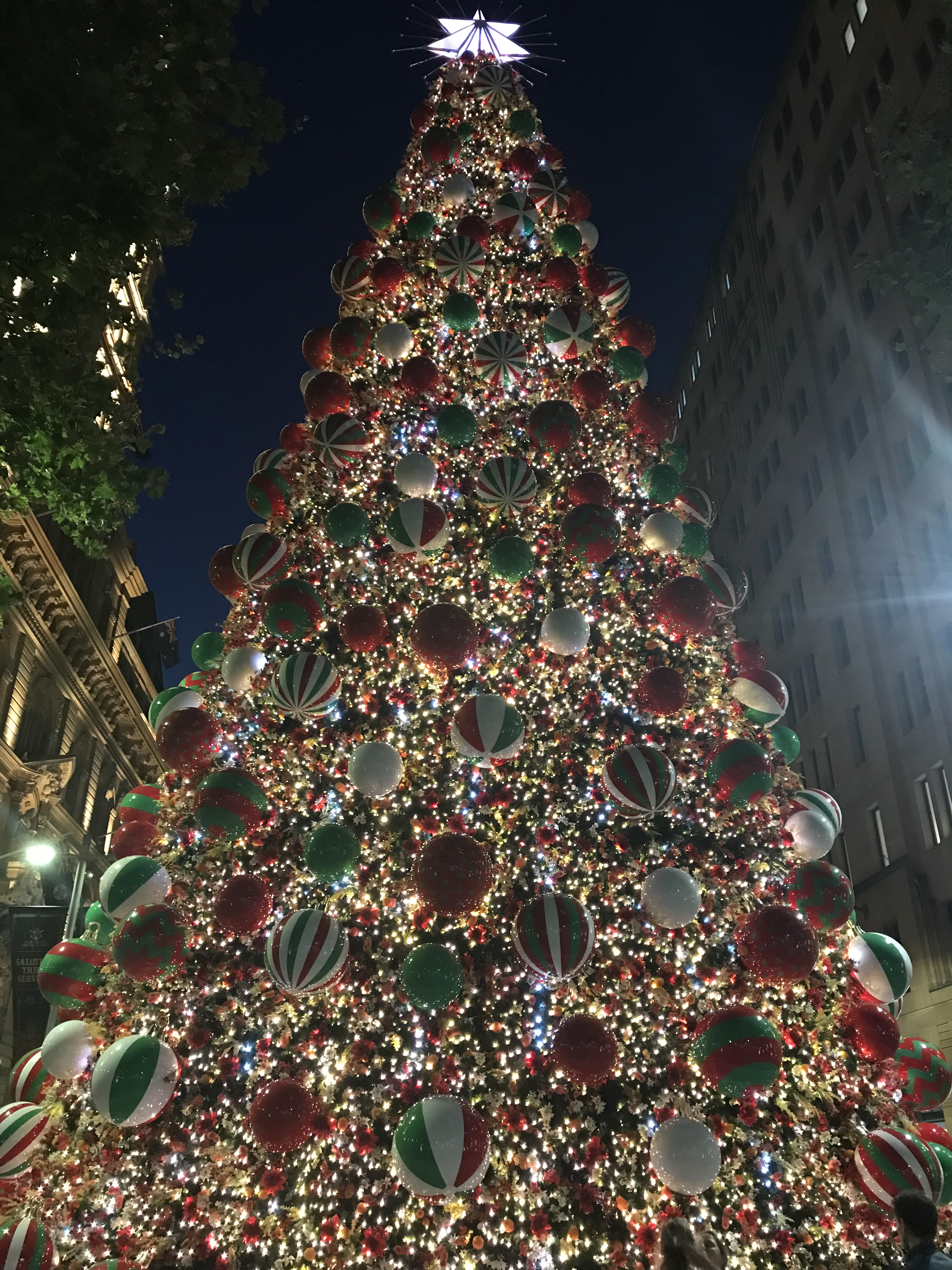
Christmas tree in Martin Place in December 2021

From its origins as a narrow laneway, Martin Place has over time become the "civic heart" of Sydney. Apart from its central location, the presence of the General Post Office and its attached telegraph office meant that this was the location where important news first arrived in the city. As a result, in earlier decades this was a focal point for gatherings to await or celebrate significant events. The cenotaph was sited on Martin Place outside the General Post Office because this was where crowds gathered in the city at the end of World War I. Martin Place is now the centre of the city's official war commemoration ceremonies. The extensions of the street gave it new significance in the civic scheme of the city, forming a broad and open connection between George Street, the original "High Street" and commercial axis, and Macquarie Street, the ceremonial avenue and governmental axis. People still gather on the plaza today to participate in significant events, for example to watch live broadcasts on a large television screen during the 2000 Summer Olympics, or the apology to the Stolen Generation in 2008. An amphitheatre built into the plaza near Pitt Street has hosted music and cultural events, as well as political protests.

Some regular civic events now held on Martin Place include:

- Martin Place was a major opening night site during the annual Sydney Festival in early January.
- An Anzac Day dawn service has been held on 25 April at the Cenotaph every year since 1927.
- Visual art displays during Vivid Sydney in late May to early June each year,
- Outdoor concerts are held in the amphitheatre throughout the year.
- Sydney's largest Christmas tree stands in Martin Place every year in front of the GPO in November and December. A Christmas concert is held in late November, when the tree is first lit by the Lord Mayor.

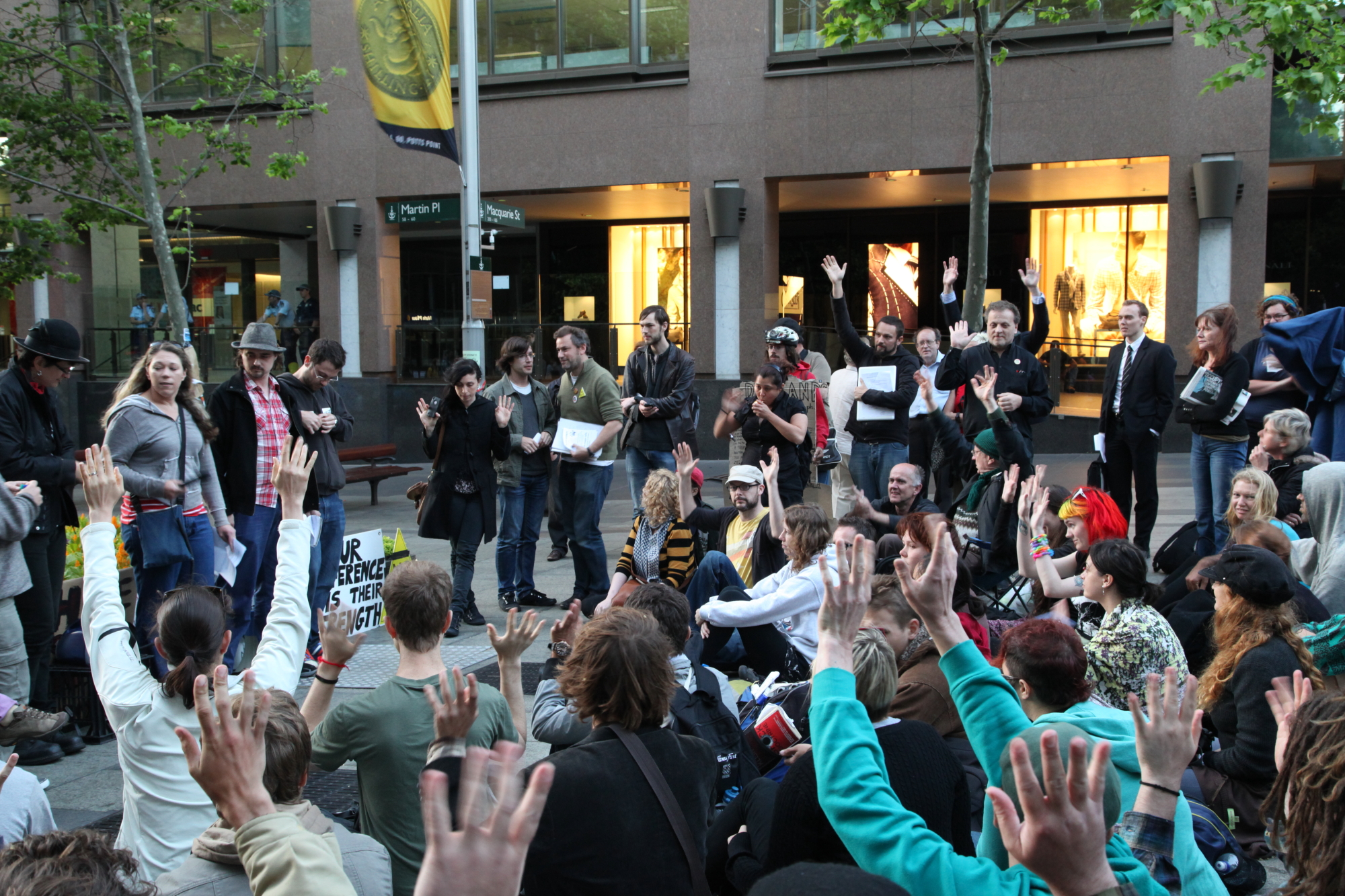
Occupy Sydney protests in Martin Place, October 2011

Some events that have occurred in Martin Place include:

- In 1901, a large temporary colonnade and Federation Arch was constructed between George Street and Pitt Street to celebrate the Federation of Australia and the visit of the first Governor General, Lord Hopetoun.
- In 1954, a motorcade, with Queen Elizabeth II and the Duke of Edinburgh, drove along Martin Place during their first visit to Australia.
- The official opening of Stage I of the pedestrianisation of Martin Place between George Street and Pitt Street took place at 1.00pm on Friday 10 September 1971, by Lord Mayor L. Emmet McDermott.
- The official opening of Stage II took place in July 1976 and Stage V in September 1977.
- The official opening of Stages III and IV of Martin Place took place at 1.00pm on Monday 7 May 1979, by Lord Mayor Nelson Meers, coinciding with the opening of the Eastern Suburbs Railway.
- Martin Place was a live outdoor venue for the Sydney 2000 Summer Olympics featuring 4.8 by 6.4 metre television screens broadcasting live coverage.
- The Occupy Sydney protest movement occupied a section of Martin Place close to the Macquarie Street end from 15 October 2011. Some protesters were removed on 23 October 2011. A series of evictions by authorities and re-establishment by protestors occurred in July 2013, ending with the final eviction of the camp on 9 July 2013.
- 2012 Sydney anti-Islam film protests – On 15 September 2012, around 300 Muslims protested in response to the anti-Islam film Innocence of Muslims in Sydney CBD, including Martin Place. The event escalated into scenes of violent confrontation between police and various protesters, particularly around the areas of Martin Place and Hyde Park.
- 2014 Sydney hostage crisis – On 15–16 December 2014, Martin Place was placed into lock-down after an incident involving an Islamic gunman at the Lindt Café, with 18 people taken hostage. The armed siege had killed three people—two victims and the perpetrator himself. After the crisis it was reported that bogus Buddhist monks appeared targeting mourners over donations.
- A group of homeless people known as Tent City camping in the upper section of the mall from December 2016, leaving in August 2017.

== Appearances in popular culture ==
Lloyd Rees fountain featured in the film The Matrix.

Film

- The Matrix trilogy: The Lloyd Rees fountain near the intersection of Martin Place and Pitt Street was featured in the film The Matrix (1999), where Neo is distracted by the Woman in the Red Dress. The fountain has been rebuilt since the film was made. Martin Place was also the location of the final fight between Neo and Agent Smith in The Matrix Revolutions.
- Superman Returns (2006), in the scenes where Superman saves Kitty Kowalski from a car accident.
- Scenes from the 2024 film The Fall Guy were shot here.

Television

- The studios of Seven's flagship programs Seven News, Sunrise and Weekend Sunrise. Non-flagship programmes filmed in that studio included Seven Early News, Seven Morning News and Seven News at 4 along with entertainment show The Morning Show were all broadcast from the Seven Network's Martin Place studios. These programs were all moved to South Eveleigh in 2023.
- Rake, an ABC television series based on a self-destructive barrister is based in Martin Place.
- Martin Place and the bar Hotel Chambers (located on the Elizabeth Street corner) were prominently featured in the Australian telemovie Go Big.
- The Mole's 2005 series of reality television series featured a live elimination round filmed in the Seven Network studios in Martin Place. The final round in which the Mole and the winner were revealed was also filmed here; one notable past contestant outside the studio that night was Bob Young, winner of the Weakest Link special in season 3.
- The Amazing Race: Martin Place was featured during a Roadblock task in second season of the reality television series The Amazing Race.

== See also ==
- Sydney central business district
- George Street, Sydney
- Macquarie Street, Sydney
