= 343 George Street, Sydney =

Heritage-listed building in Sydney, Australia

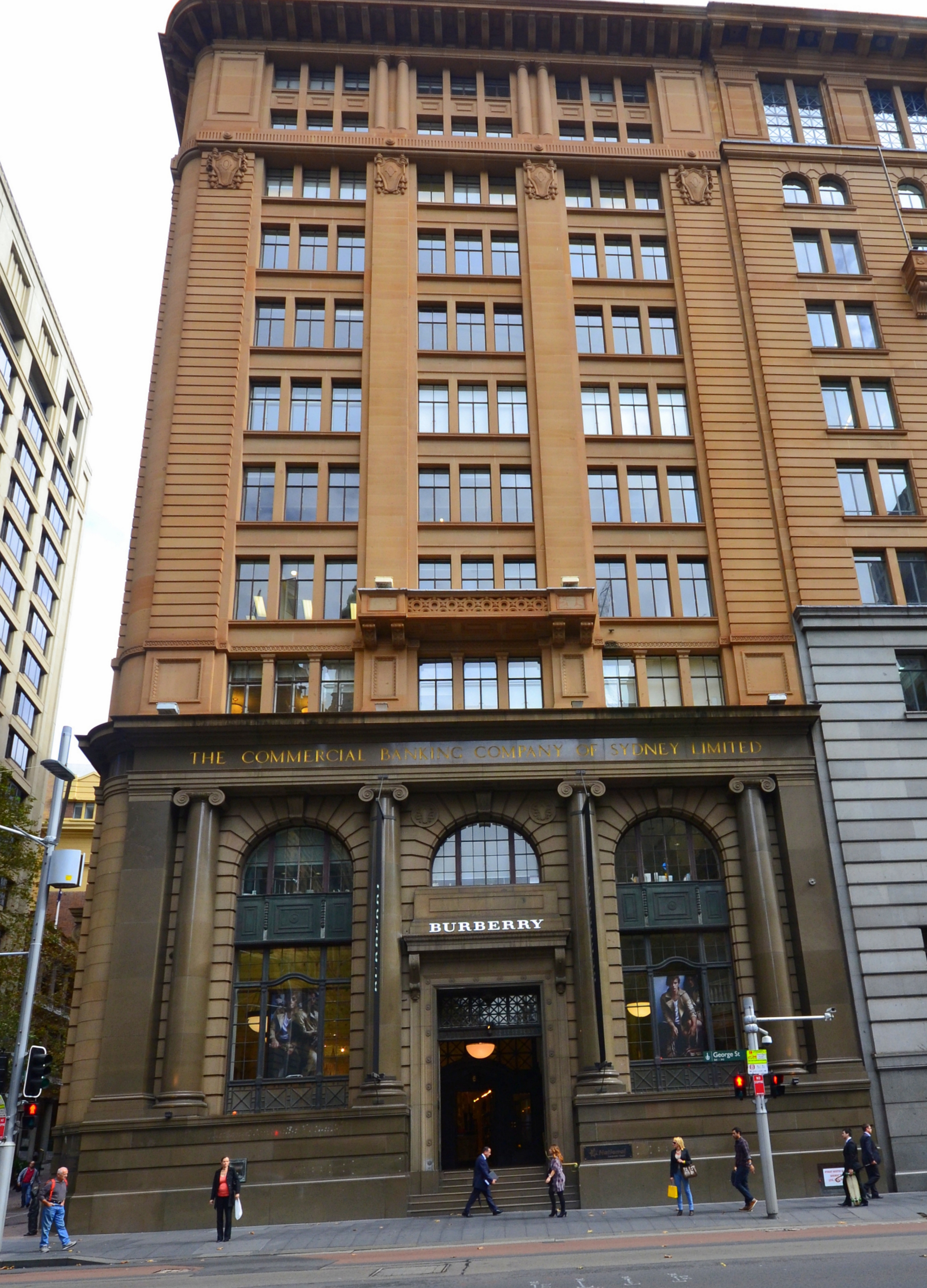
- the former CBC bank building, pictured in 2014

- Location within Sydney Location within Australia
- 33.8675°S 151.2067°E
- Location: 343 George Street Sydney central business district, City of Sydney, New South Wales, Australia

History
- Built: 1921–1925

Site notes
- Architect(s): Kent and Massie
- Architectural style: Inter-war Commercial Palazzo
- Owner: SAS Trustee Corporation

New South Wales Heritage Register
- Official name: CBC Bank (former); CBC Bank; NAB Bank; Barrack House
- Type: State heritage (built)
- Designated: 2 April 1999
- Reference no.: 428
- Type: Bank
- Category: Commercial

343 George Street, Sydney is a heritage-listed former bank building and now nine-storey retail and commercial premises. It is located at 343 George Street in the Sydney central business district, in the City of Sydney local government area of New South Wales, Australia.

It was built from 1921 to 1925, and until 2008 housed banking premises of the Commercial Banking Company of Sydney (CBC) and later National Australia Bank. The building is also known as CBC Bank, NAB Bank and Barrack House. The property is now owned by the New South Wales Government-owned superannuation fund. The ground floor (former banking floor) is leased as retail premises, while the upper storeys are used as commercial office space.

It was added to the New South Wales State Heritage Register on 2 April 1999. As of December 2018 the building is occupied by Burberry.

== History ==
The building was completed in 1925 for the Commercial Banking Co of Sydney, which merged with the National Bank of Australasia in 1981 to create the National Australia Bank.

== Description ==
=== Modifications and dates ===
- 1923 – George Street portion rebuilt, designed by Kent & Massie;
- 1939 – Hydroelectric bullion lift installed, serving basement, main banking floor and first floor;
- 1939 – New bronze windows replace existing steel windows (steel had rusted);
- 1955 – Alterations to lifts and partitioning of 5th floor;
- c. 1973 – Installation of new light fittings in banking chamber (IES Award for Meritorious Lighting received);
- 1973 – Alterations to five office floors;
- 1976 – Repartitioning on 2nd and 9th floors designed by Laurie & Heath;
- 1984 – Partitions and fit-out of 1st floor;
- 1984 – Internal high windows removed from exiting 2nd floor Managing Director's Office, bricked up and a frieze installed over;
- 1984 – Refurbishment of lower ground floor;
- 1986 – Timber portion of teller counter on ground floor renovated;
- 1987 – Disused lift front opposite Barrack Street entrance on ground floor retained in original location and converted to a doorway; New sections of infill marble installed to match existing counters on ground floor; New cash counters installed behind existing marble-faced counter; New stair and partition to back lane on ground floor; and Chandeliers fitted with new opal acrylic spheres and bawon (sic.) and new gallery, maintaining rose;
- 1990 – Installation of bronze double doors on Barrack Street;
- 2000 – Signage for a temporary exhibition of Gianni Versace works.

== Heritage listing ==
As at 26 November 2002, 343 George Street, Sydney is historically significant as the former headquarters of one of the leading banks in New South Wales, the Commercial Banking Company of Sydney Ltd., which had occupied this site since the 1850s until its merger with the National Bank of Australasia in the 1980s to form the National Australia Bank.

The design and execution, scale, form and materials of this building combine to present an extremely fine expression of the qualities and aspirations of a leading, well established and respected bank from the 1920s at a time when great confidence and trust was placed in banks such as the CBC.

The building is significant as a good and early example of the Inter-war Commercial Palazzo style. The ground floor, lower ground floor safe deposit vault and area, and surviving original interiors of the executive areas are exceptionally fine and rare examples of design and craftsmanship of their period, The Banking Chamber and Safe Deposit area are the finest and most intact marble finished bank interiors from the early 20th century in Sydney, the only comparable interiors being the Westpac Bank next door at 341 George Street, and the former State Savings Bank in Martin Place, both of which depend in large part on faux marble ('scagliola') for their effect. The principle ground and lower ground floor spaces are fitted with a collection of exceptionally fine and now rare Australian marbles. The circular Chubb Safe Deposit Vault door is the earliest, as well as one of only two, doors of its type in Australia, the other also being in Sydney.

The elegant grandeur of the banking chamber space with its fine marble and bronze finishes and fittings and the play of natural and artificial light within it evoke the stature, role and functions of one of Sydney's former leading banking institutions. The building was designed by architects Kent and Massie and is arguably the finest commercial building to be produced by this partnership. It was built by the firm of Stuart Brothers. Both firms made prominent contributions to Sydney's architecture in the first half of the 20th century.

Together with its neighbour, the Westpac Bank, and other nearby significant building of the 19th and early 20th centuries, 343 George Street forms part of an imposing group which visually closes the western end of Martin Place and the north side of Barrack Street.

CBC Bank was listed on the New South Wales State Heritage Register on 2 April 1999 having satisfied the following criteria.

The place is important in demonstrating the course, or pattern, of cultural or natural history in New South Wales.

343 George Street is an extremely fine and representative example of a grand commercial banking headquarters in the Palazzo style. It contains a remarkably intact interior, its arrangements representing a fine expression of commercial and public banking operations in the inter-war years in the city of Sydney.

The place has a strong or special association with a person, or group of persons, of importance of cultural or natural history of New South Wales's history.

It was the Headquarters of one of New South Wales' most important banking companies, purpose-built to enhance the reputation of that enterprise. It is associated with architects Kent & Massie, being one of their finest buildings, and builders Stuart Brother, both prominent in commercial buildings operations in Sydney and in the early 20th century.

The place is important in demonstrating aesthetic characteristics and/or a high degree of creative or technical achievement in New South Wales.

343 George Street has the ability to demonstrate extremely fine design qualities of both structure, form, decoration, fittings, fixings and furniture. It also incorporates workmanship and design of the very highest quality in the State. The design and execution of both Australian and Carrara marble is unique in NSW. The circular Chubb vault door was the first to be imported and remains one of only two in the Southern Hemisphere, the other being in the Commonwealth Bank in Martin Place.

The place has a strong or special association with a particular community or cultural group in New South Wales for social, cultural or spiritual reasons.

As the former Headquarters of one of New South Wales' most important banks, 343 George Street may retain special associations with former clients and employees.

The place has potential to yield information that will contribute to an understanding of the cultural or natural history of New South Wales.

The design, craftsmanship and technology evident in the building, its fittings and finishes are fine and increasingly rare examples of the very high quality of construction and workmanship.

The place possesses uncommon, rare or endangered aspects of the cultural or natural history of New South Wales.

The interior public areas of this building - the main banking hall and foyer areas of the lower ground floor are of a type and scale now rare in Sydney and beyond. It is the finest marble finished banking chamber in New South Wales retaining its original furniture, fixings and finishings intact. It also contains one of only two circular Chubb vault doors of their type in the southern hemisphere.

The place is important in demonstrating the principal characteristics of a class of cultural or natural places/environments in New South Wales.

343 George Street demonstrates all the qualities and attributes of the headquarters of a major 20th century national bank. In its quality and intactness - public areas and private banking offices - it is a remarkable survivor of a class of commercial buildings, now considered irrelevant to the image of the modern commercial bank. Most other redundant banking chambers of this type have been generally altered beyond recognition due to changes in use.

== See also ==
- Australian non-residential architectural styles
