= Sydney Cenotaph =

War memorial in Martin Place, Sydney

- Australia
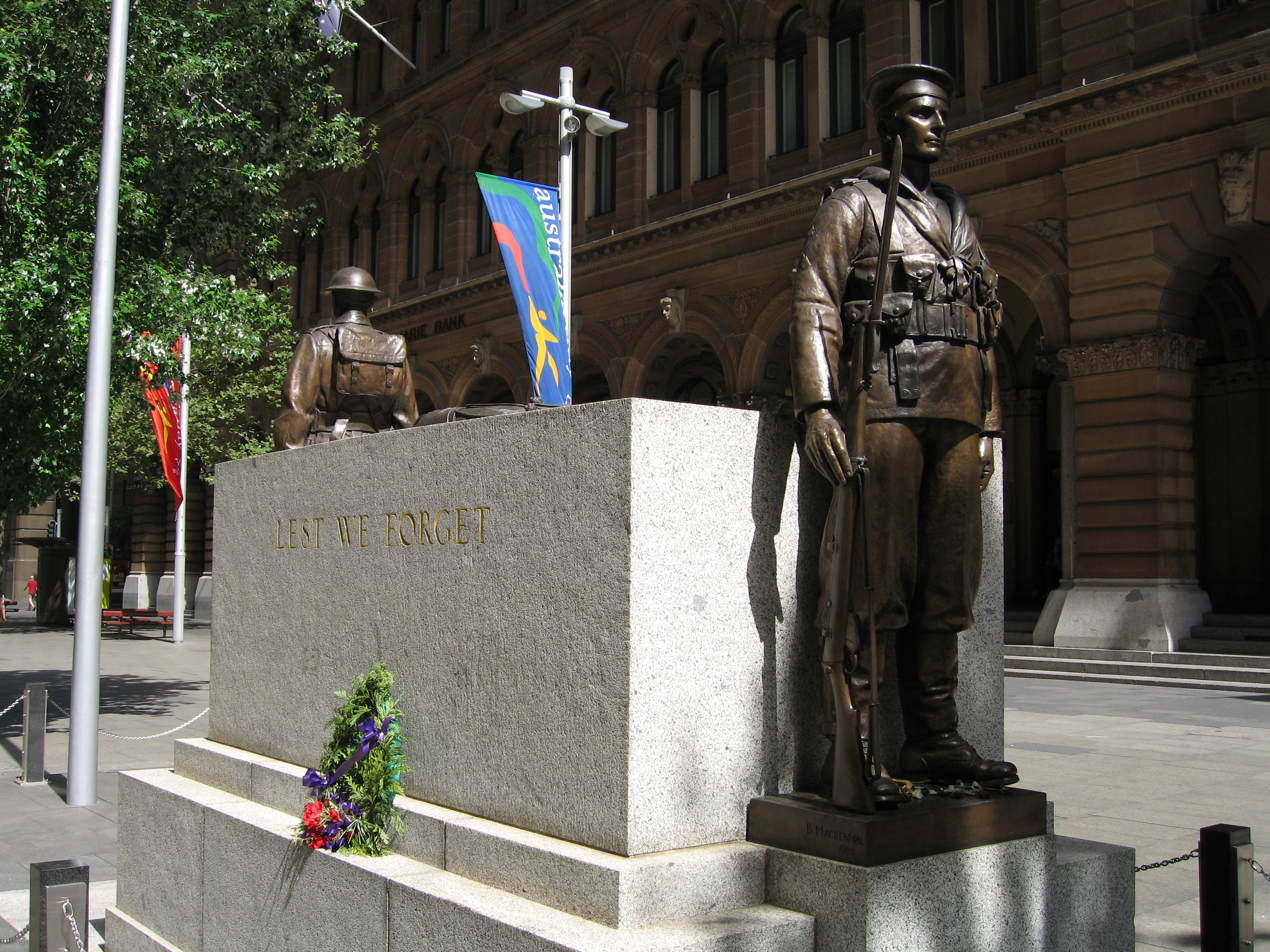
- For the war dead of New South Wales from all conflicts
- Unveiled: 25 April 1927
- Location: 33°52′03.04″S 151°12′27.93″E; Martin Place, Sydney, New South Wales, Australia
- Designed by: Sir Bertram Mackennal
- "Lest We Forget" & "To Our Glorious Dead"

New South Wales Heritage Register
- Official name: Cenotaph; Martin Place Memorial; The Cenotaph
- Type: State heritage (built)
- Designated: 11 November 2009
- Reference no.: 1799
- Type: War Memorial
- Category: Monuments and Memorials
- Builders: Dorman Long & Co

The Sydney Cenotaph is a heritage-listed monument located in Martin Place, in Sydney, New South Wales, Australia. It was designed by Bertram Mackennal and built from 1927 to 1929 by Dorman Long & Co. It is also known as Martin Place Memorial and The Cenotaph. It is one of the oldest World War I monuments in central Sydney. It was added to the New South Wales State Heritage Register on 11 November 2009.

The cenotaph takes the form of a monolithic stone block in a sepulchral shape. At its two shorter ends stand two bronze statues, a soldier and a sailor guarding the cenotaph. Words are carved into the longer faces of the cenotaph: on the southern side, facing the General Post Office, the carving reads: "To Our Glorious Dead"; on the northern side, facing Challis House, it reads: "Lest We Forget." Remembrance events are frequently held at the Cenotaph. Most importantly, it is the centre for Sydney's main Anzac and Armistice Day dawn service ceremonies, regularly drawing thousands of attendees.

== History ==
In 1914, Australia volunteered to help the United Kingdom when it declared war, and despatched troops to fight in what soon became known as the Great War. Australians fought in the Middle East and Europe. Casualties were severe. By the time of the Armistice in November 1918, of a total of 331,781 enlistments who had embarked for overseas, 215,585 service personnel, a proportion of nearly 65%, had become casualties. Many of these men had died rather than being wounded. Grief was widespread across the community.

=== Development ===
Due to a delay in the completion of the Anzac Memorial in Hyde Park, the Cenotaph was built in Martin Place to serve the needs of people who needed a focus for commemoration and mourning for the sacrifices of the Great War. In November 1924, the Sunday Times reported a plea by Fred Davison, a senior RSL member. He advocated building a memorial in Martin Place where so many appeals and recruiting rallies had been held during the war, and where so many commemorative events had been held since the end of the war. Hugh D. McIntosh, proprietor of the Sunday Times persuaded the new Premier Jack Lang in 1925 to set aside £10,000 to erect a cenotaph.

Unlike most other war memorials in Australia, the Martin Place Cenotaph, meaning "empty tomb", does not name individuals, but instead mourns and commemorates the communal sacrifice of lives lost at war. It was based an Australian reworking of a new type of memorial developed in London by Edwin Lutyens for Whitehall in 1919 as a 'tomb on pylon, inscribed only with words composed by the Prime Minister, Lloyd George, "The Glorious Dead" '. Installed temporarily to be saluted by troops of the empire during the victory march through London on 19 July 1919, the London Cenotaph spoke so powerfully to bereaved people that Lutyens had to make it again in stone'.

It was unusual for the NSW Government to fund a war memorial, since almost all memorials were organised and funded by voluntary committees rather than by government. Lang had opposed conscription during the war and was involved in anti-imperialist movements. Promoting a new image of himself and his government as 'the Soldier's Friend' was one response to the growing strength of veterans' organisations. Positioned where so many recruiting rallies and wartime events occurred, the Cenotaph was directly linked to the events of the Great War.

The "Memorial Committee" of the State Government, City Council and ex-service organisations oversaw the project. A proposed competition to design the Cenotaph did not eventuate because Lang instead approached sculptor Sir Bertram Mackennal when he was visiting Sydney from England and commissioned him to undertake the work. A contract was signed with Mackennal on 9 March 1926. Mackennal had designed the tomb of Edward VII at Windsor and the medals for the Olympic Games of 1908. He also constructed the statues of Cardinal Patrick Moran and Archbishop Michael Kelly which stand at the southern end of St Mary's Cathedral.

==== Design elements ====
For the Cenotaph in Martin Place, Mackennal designed a "chunky rectangular form guarded by a soldier and sailor". It was a more modest version of a sculpture he had designed for a cenotaph in Brisbane, which was never built. It was disliked by some critics at that time, such as Building magazine's George Taylor who charged that it was "a mere tombstone for people to put wreaths up against". The artist Margaret Preston admired the "stern simplicity" of the stone slab but objected to the realism of the servicemen. Mackennnal's depiction may have been influenced by the sculpture designed for the Royal Artillery Memorial in London by Charles Sargeant Jagger, whose figures were also realistic rather than stylised. The designs for the figures were also criticised for being "at ease" without their arms reversed - the normal mourning stance for military personnel at memorial ceremonies. Mackennal responded: "Memorial not a tomb. Figures not mourning. Guarding altar of remembrance.". In the words of Ken Inglis 'it may have been the very blankness of Mackennal's Cenotaph... that allowed so many people over the years to feel comforted in its presence'.

In March 1927, Mackennal arranged for Dorman Long & Co to erect the granite pedestal and John Bradfield (who was on the Memorial Committee) to supervise. The 23 stones in the pedestal were all carefully arranged so that any white or black markings would not be noticeable. The main block of granite came from the Moruya quarry of Dorman Long & Co, where on 9 July 1927, Bradfield oversaw the cutting of the granite. All the dressing and lettering was completed at Moruya by Bill Benzie and Mr Joe Wallace. Italian stonemason Fueravante Cadiccio came to Sydney to erect it. State Records NSW holds photographs of the granite block being prepared at Moruya. Similarly, there are photographs of the positioning of the main slab with a block and tackle using Yale Spur-geared Blocks.

The monument was designed with the images of two servicemen cast in bronze on either side of a central plinth, topped by a bronze wreath. They were modelled on two real returned servicemen. The soldier was based on Private William Pigott Darby who had served at Gallipoli while the sailor was based on Leading Signalman John William Varcoe who had served in the RAN. Darby was born on 25 April 1872 in Monasterevin, Ireland. He served in the United States Army during the Spanish–American War and in 1914 then enlisted in the Australian Imperial Force (AIF) at Toowoomba. He was actually 42 and not 38 as he stated on the form, presumably if he was over 40, he would not have been accepted into the army. He was part of the Anzac force that landed at Gallipoli on 25 April 1915, the morning of his 43rd birthday and served as a stretcher-bearer with 15 Infantry Battalion and later 4 Field Ambulance. He was part of the Anzac force that served at The Somme, where he was blown up and deafened in a shell explosion on 12 August 1916. He returned to Australia in January 1918 and was discharged as a Lance Sergeant, ending his AIF service as a medical orderly at the military hospital at Randwick. He died in Queensland at the age of 63. Leading Seaman John William Varcoe, RAN, was born at Bakers Swamp in 1897. He entered the Royal Australian Navy (RAN) on 3 June 1913 and trained in Training Ship Tingara. Varcoe was drafted to HMVS Cerberus and HMAS Pioneer before joining the destroyer HMAS Parramatta (D55) in 1917. By then a signalman, he served in Parramatta until 20 July 1919. The destroyer was one of six RAN River Class destroyers based at Brindisi, Italy. On 15 November 1917, an Italian steamer, Orione, was torpedoed while on passage from Valona to Brindisi. Parramatta took Orione in tow and, while setting up the tow, the two ships were again attacked by a submarine. Parramatta continued with the tow until relieved by a tug. Varcoe had been aboard Orione and for his efforts in maintaining communications he was awarded a Distinguished Service Medal. He was discharged from the Navy at Sydney on 8 April 1928.

==== Dedication and official opening ====
A ceremony of dedication had been held on 8 August 1927. The completed memorial was officially unveiled by NSW Premier Thomas Bavin on 21 February 1929 with a speech by Sir John Monash. Made of granite, it weighs 20 tonnes (20 long tons; 22 short tons).

=== Dawn Service origin ===
The Dawn Service arose from events during the erection of the Cenotaph. At dawn on Anzac Day, 25 April 1927, five returned men happened upon an elderly woman laying a wreath at the still incomplete Cenotaph. Impressed by the solemnity of the moment, they convinced the secretary of the Australian Legion (E. A. Rushbrook MBE) to conduct an official service at dawn at the Sydney Cenotaph on 25 April 1928. Conceived as an opportunity to lay wreaths and remember the Anzacs in silence, it began at 4.30 am, the time when the first Anzacs landed at Gallipoli. It was not advertised but attracted 150 people in its first year. Public interest encouraged the organisers to invite the president of the Returned Soldiers' Sailors' Imperial League of Australia (later renamed the Returned & Services League or RSL), Dean Talbot, to offer a prayer at the service. By 1930 a crowd of 2,000 attended and a bugler was added. The following year, the Governor's presence made the dawn service even more official. Most of these elements are retained in the Anzac Day Dawn Service at Sydney's Cenotaph, which still attracts large crowds every year. When historian Charles Bean attended the 1931 Dawn Service at Wellington, he observed that holding the service at this time was appropriate since dawn was usually the hour when the major battles of the Great War had commenced.

The Dawn Service tradition eventually spread to other Australian states. At the heart of every service is a powerful set of symbols: the rising sun representing a new day, the memory of soldiers waiting for the whistle to advance, and the iconic rising sun badge worn on AIF slouch hats. Following the first official Anzac Day ceremony at the Sydney Cenotaph in 1928, the Dawn Service rapidly became the primary focus for mourning and commemoration in New South Wales..

The Cenotaph has gained a sacrosanct place in the history of war memorial services in NSW. Furthermore, it is not only a focus for Australian mourning and memory. Visiting dignitaries often place wreaths on the Cenotaph. On 4 July 1942, for instance, US troops stationed in Australia laid wreaths on the Cenotaph on the US Independence Day, in memory of the US troops who died in the defence of the Philippines.

A proposal to add sculptures of an airman and a nurse in 1962 did not come to fruition. Many people, even former aircrew, agreed that it was more powerful as a simple symbol for all rather than as naturalistic representations of everyone who had served. Another proposal in 1954 to shift the Cenotaph came to nothing, though some chains were installed around it and the plinth was enlarged. A City Council photo of 11 August 1966 showed bollards had been installed by this date. Peace groups and feminist organisations opposed to aspects of the Anzac legend from the 1970s onward have focused their protests on the Cenotaph at Martin Place. The conversion of Martin Place into a pedestrian plaza from the 1960s onward reduced threats to the monument from traffic.

== Description ==
The Cenotaph in Martin Place is a restrained memorial designed as a granite altar with a bronze serviceman at each end. The altar stone, quarried in Moruya in 1927, is 3.05m long, 1.65m wide and 1.25m high sitting above a 970mm stepped base, which runs east to west following the street alignment of Martin Place. It is positioned directly over the Tank Stream which flows in an underground channel beneath it.

The larger than life size sculptures of servicemen at the east and west ends are by Australian expatriate sculptor Bertram Mackennal and stand on Moruya granite plinths. The eastern sculpture is of an infantryman from Gallipoli, Private William Pigot Derby, the western is a RAN signalman, John William Varcoe. Both are depicted realistically, wearing their uniforms, packs and carrying weapons. The men stand in the "at ease" position, guarding the Cenotaph. On the top of the altar is a bronze wreath. The servicemen each face a flagpole approximately 3m from the monument.

The north face of the cenotaph is inscribed on its north face, "TO OUR GLORIOUS DEAD" (similar to the words used in the London Cenotaph at Whitehall, 'the glorious dead'). On the south face are the words: "LEST WE FORGET". The Cenotaph and flagpoles is narrowly enclosed by a low fence of metal bollards linked by a metal chain. A white poplar tree was planted several metres from either end of the Cenotaph during the 1970s.

=== Condition ===
As at 20 July 2009, Excellent physical condition.

Minor modifications

=== Modifications and dates ===
Bollards and chains around cenotaph apparently added by Sydney City Council in the 1950s. Populus alba were planted on the axis of the Cenotaph at eastern and western ends 1970s.

=== Statues ===
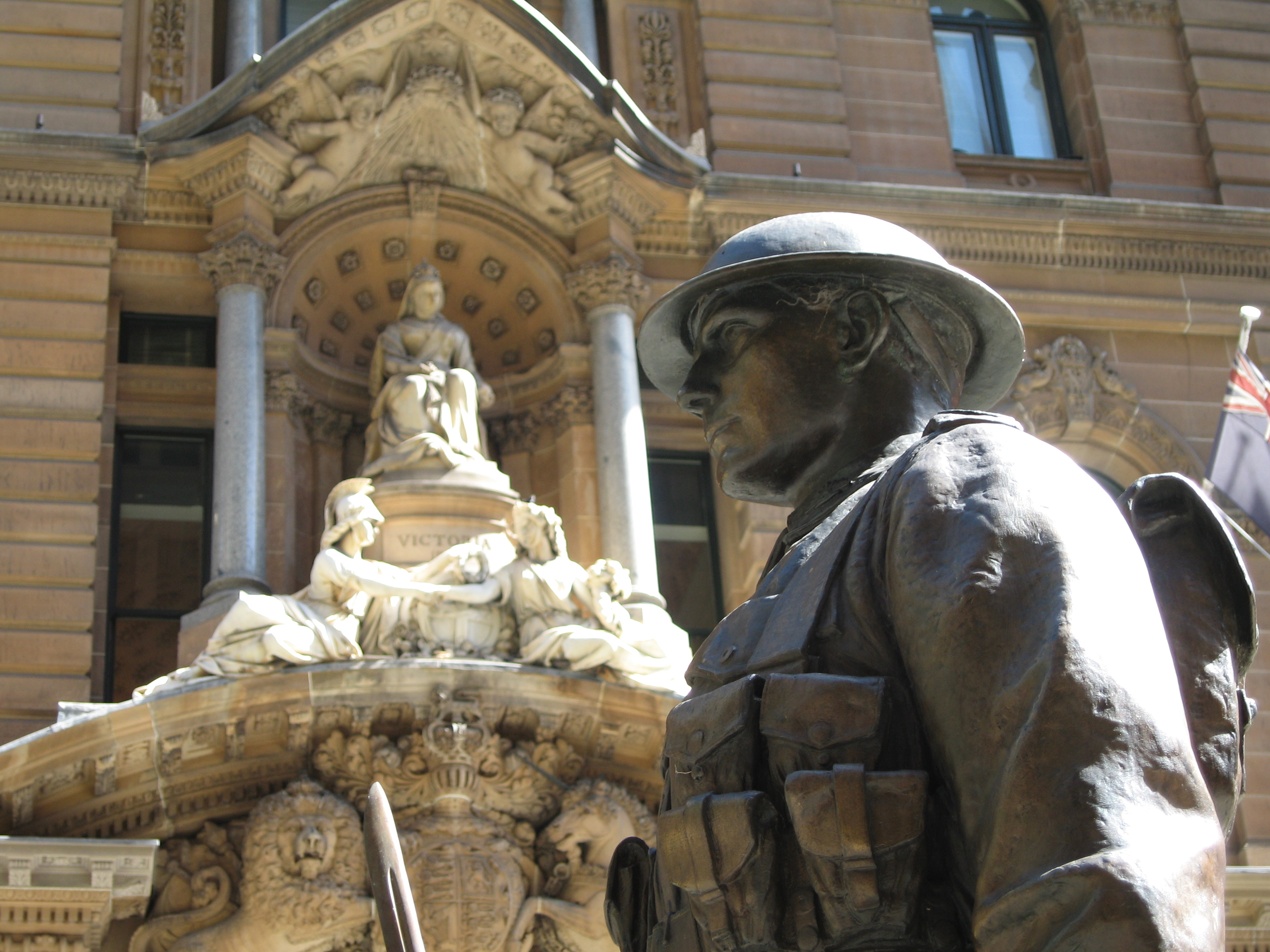
Detail of the soldier statue, with the General Post Office in the background

The model for the soldier was Private William Pigott Darby from the 15th Infantry Battalion (Gallipoli & the Western Front; wounded at Pozières) and 4th Field Ambulance AIF. A native of Monasterevin, Ireland (born 25 April 1872), he died in Brisbane on 15 November 1935.

The model for the sailor was Leading Seaman John William Varcoe. He enlisted on 3 June 1913, served on HMAS Pioneer (1914–1916) in German East Africa and on HMAS Parramatta (1917–1919). He was awarded the Commonwealth Distinguished Service Medal in 1918 (one of 60 Australians to earn this honour) and died in October 1948.

== Heritage listing ==
As at 12 November 2009, The Cenotaph is of State historical significance for its embodiment of collective grief at the loss of life by Australian servicemen in World War I. It is also of historical significance to the State for its role in inaugurating the "Dawn Service" on Anzac Day in 1929, the year it was opened, a tradition now observed on Anzac Day throughout Australia. Unlike most other war memorials in Australia, the Cenotaph, meaning "empty tomb", does not name individuals, but instead mourns and commemorates the communal sacrifice of lives lost at war. This makes it both representative and rare as a war memorial. The Cenotaph is of State significance for its historical association with those who lost their lives at war and with those who have mourned them. It is of State aesthetic significance as an Australian reworking of the British prototype cenotaph developed by Edwin Lutyens for Whitehall in 1919, and as an example of the monumental sculpture work of Bertram Mackennal. Its design shows restrained symbolism in the simple granite altar guarded by two servicemen. The Cenotaph is of State social significance as a powerful focal point for memorial services in NSW associated with all wars and conflicts.

Cenotaph was listed on the New South Wales State Heritage Register on 11 November 2009 having satisfied the following criteria.

The place is important in demonstrating the course, or pattern, of cultural or natural history in New South Wales.

The Cenotaph is of State historical significance for its embodiment of collective grief at the loss of Australian servicemen and women's lives in World War I. It provides compelling evidence of the impact of the Great War on the people of NSW. The Cenotaph is also of historical significance for its role in inaugurating the "Dawn Service" on Anzac Day in 1928, the year it was opened, a tradition now observed on Anzac Day throughout Australia and internationally (for example, at Gallipoli in Turkey). Unlike most other war memorials in Australia, the Cenotaph, meaning "empty tomb", does not name individuals, but instead mourns and commemorates the communal sacrifice of lives lost at war. Positioned in Martin Place where so many recruiting rallies and wartime events occurred, the Cenotaph is physically and symbolically linked to the Australian experience of the Great War.

The place has a strong or special association with a person, or group of persons, of importance of cultural or natural history of New South Wales's history.

The Cenotaph of State significance for its historical association with the servicemen and women whose loss of life has been commemorated in services focused on it since 1928. It is also of State significance for its association with the people and organisations that have commemorated those lives lost at war, especially the Returned Servicemen's League (RSL), which maintains a custodial role over the monument. Prominent individuals associated with the Cenotaph include its sculptor, Bertram Mackennal (the first Australian-born artist to be knighted), JJ Bradfield who supervised its erection and the NSW premier JT Lang whose government funded it.

The place is important in demonstrating aesthetic characteristics and/or a high degree of creative or technical achievement in New South Wales.

The Cenotaph is of State significance as an Australian reworking of the British prototype cenotaph developed by Edwin Lutyens for Whitehall in 1919. It is also significant as a well-known, restrained example of the monumental sculpture work of Bertram Mackennal. The design of this "altar of remembrance", as Mackennal described it, is unusual in its simplicity - a rectangular block of granite, flanked by realistic, slightly larger than life sized figures depicting a soldier and a sailor, standing guard. Although initially criticized for its simple sculptural qualities, 'it may have been the very blankness of Mackennal's Cenotaph . . . that allowed so many people over the years to feel comforted in its presence'.

The place has a strong or special association with a particular community or cultural group in New South Wales for social, cultural or spiritual reasons.

The Cenotaph is of State social significance for its long-time role as a ceremonial focus for memorial services by numerous veterans' organizations, individuals and groups representing civilians affected by war. Its role in the inauguration of the Dawn Service, a major part of every Anzac Day ceremony, enhances its association with a deeply felt strand of popular remembrance. Positioned in a pedestrian thoroughfare in Sydney's central business district it maintains a solemn reminder of the sacrifices that Australians have made at war.

The place has potential to yield information that will contribute to an understanding of the cultural or natural history of New South Wales.

It does not appear to meet this criterion of State significance.

The place possesses uncommon, rare or endangered aspects of the cultural or natural history of New South Wales.

The Cenotaph is of State significance for its rarity in NSW as a war memorial that does not name individuals, but instead mourns and commemorates the communal sacrifice of lives lost at war. It is also rare as the only war memorial to be positioned in Martin Place, where historical gatherings concerning Australian war efforts have been typically held, for example recruitment drives and victory day celebrations. It is also rare as a memorial which was commissioned by the State Government rather than by a local community. Along with the Anzac Memorial in Hyde Park, the Cenotaph is widely regarded as a principal monument in NSW to the servicemen and women who died on active service in war.

The place is important in demonstrating the principal characteristics of a class of cultural or natural places/environments in New South Wales.

The Cenotaph is of State significance for its representative role as one of the most prominent war memorials in NSW. The Cenotaph occupies a mid-way position between major State monuments (such as the Anzac Memorial in Sydney's Hyde Park or the Shrine of Remembrance in Melbourne) and the innumerable small town memorials erected by local communities across Australia. Unlike them, it does not commemorate the death of specific individuals but memorializes the sacrifices made by all who served.

== See also ==
- List of monuments and memorials in Sydney
