= List of Australian architects =

This is a list of Australian architects.

== A ==
Architect and education	Birth, immigration and death	Firms, institutions and geographical locations	Architectural style	Notable buildings and awards
George Henry Male Addison	Born Wales 23 March 1857; Died Brisbane 6 February 1922	Terry and Oakden; Oakden, Addison & Kemp; Melbourne and Brisbane		Albert Street Uniting Church; Old Museum Building, Brisbane
Lily Isabel Maude Addison	Born Melbourne 1885; Died 1968	G.H.M. Addison & Son; Brisbane		
Joseph Allen: Articled to Gordon Mackinnon	Born Cornwall 6 August 1869; Arrived Australia 1879; Died 23 May 1933 Swan River	Rhodes & Co (Civil Engineers); Henry Simon & Co (Milling Engineers); Allen & Nicholas Perth; New South Wales and Western Australia		East Fremantle Town Hall; Fremantle Trades Hall; Geraldton Flour Mills
Rodney Alsop: Articled to Hyndman & Bates	Born Kew, Victoria 22 December 1881; Died 26 October 1932	Partners: F L Klingender; Kingsley Henderson; Marcus Martin; C H Sayce; Bramwell Smith; Victoria and Western Australia	Federation Arts and Crafts; Inter-War Mediterranean; Inter-War Romanesque	Glyn, Kooyong Road, Toorak; Edrington, Berwick; St Mark's Anglican Church Camberwell; Footscray Park, Ballarat Road, Footscray; T & G Mutual Life offices in several state capitals; Hackett Memorial Buildings, 1932 University of Western Australia; Royal Institute of British Architects Bronze Medal
Ruth Alsop	Born in Kew, Victoria 1879; Died 1976	Klingender & Alsop; Melbourne and Sydney		
Sydney Ancher: Articled to E W S Wakeley; Architecture, Sydney Technical College	Born Woollahra 25 February 1904; Died Waratah 8 December 1979	Wunderlich Limited; Prevost, Synnot & Ruwald; Ross & Rowe; Emil Sodersten; Prevost & Ancher; John D Moore; Ancher Mortlock Murray & Woolley	Post-War International	Prevost House, Kambala Road, Bellevue Hill (1937); Ancher House, Killara Sulman Medal (1945); Farley House, North Curl Curl (1948); English House, St Ives (1949); Ancher House, Neutral Bay (1956); RAIA Gold Medal (1975)
Brit Andresen: Bachelor of Architecture, University of Trondheim, Norway	Born Trondheim, Norway; Arrived Australia 1977	Andresen and O'Gorman; Associate Professor, Architecture, University of Queensland		Burrell Museum, Glasgow, Scotland (1976); House, Mooloomba, Queensland 1996; House, Highgate Hill Brisbane (1997); RAIA Gold Medal (2002)
John Andrews AO: Architecture, University of Sydney; Architecture, Harvard University	Born Sydney 29 October 1933; Died Orange 24 March 2022	John Andrews International; Canada, United States and Australia	Late 20th century Brutalist; Late 20th century Late Modern	University of Canberra Student Residences, Bruce (1973); Hooker Tower, Sydney (1974); American Express Tower, King & George Streets, Sydney (1976); Cameron Offices in Canberra (1976); King George Tower in Sydney (1976); Australian National University Toad Hall Student Residences, Acton (1977); RAIA Gold Medal (1980); Callam Offices, Canberra (1981)
Harold Desbrowe Annear: Articled to William Salway; Articled to Joseph Reed	Born Bendigo 16 August 1865; Died St Kilda 22 June 1933	Victoria	Federation Academic Classical; Federation Arts and Crafts; Inter-War Free Classical	Springthorpe Memorial, Kew Cemetery (1897); Houses, 32, 34 and 38 The Eyrie Eaglemont (1903); Macgeorge House, Alphington (1910); Broceliande (also known as Troon) 224 Orrong Road, Toorak (1918, demolished); Inglesby, 97 Caroline Street, South Yarra (1919, demolished); Church Street Bridge, Richmond (1924); Cloyne, 609 Toorak Road, Toorak (1929)
David Anthony	Born Joondalup 6 September 1988	Behalf Architects; Victoria	21st century modern	
John Lee Archer: Civil Engineer and Colonial Architect, Van Diemen's Land	Born Chatham, Kent 26 April 1791; Died Stanley, Tasmania 4 December 1852	Tasmania	Old Colonial Georgian; Old Colonial Grecian	Parliament House, Hobart; Treasury and the Audit Department buildings, Hobart, Ordnance Stores in Salamanca Place, Hobart; St George's Church, Battery Point, Tasmania; St John's Anglican Church, New Town, Tasmania; Penitentiary Chapel, Hobart; St Luke's Presbyterian Church, Bothwell; St Luke's Church of England, Richmond; Campbell Street Gaol, Hobart
William Archer	Born Launceston, Tasmania 1820; Died Cressy, Tasmania 15 October 1874	Tasmania	Victorian Italianate	Hutchins School (1848–49); Wesleyan Chapel, St Leonards, Tasmania (1846); Anglican Church of St Peter, St Leonards (1846–47)

Return to top of page

== B ==
Architect and education	Birth, immigration and death	Firms, institutions and geographical locations	Architectural style	Notable buildings, awards and publications
Benjamin Backhouse	Born Ipswich, England 1829; Arrived Australia 1853; Died Sydney 29 July 1904	Geelong, Ballarat, Brisbane, Sydney, Newcastle, and Bathurst		
Walter Bagot: Apprenticed to Edward John Woods; Architecture, King's College, University of London	Born North Adelaide 17 March 1880; Died North Adelaide 27 July 1963	Woods & Bagot; Woods, Bagot, Laybourne-Smith & Irwin; South Australia	Inter-War Academic Classical	St Peter's Cathedral, Adelaide (1907–45); Chapel of the Convent of Mercy, Adelaide; St Francis Xavier's Cathedral, Adelaide, additions; Bonython Hall, University of Adelaide (1936); Barr Smith Library, University of Adelaide
Arthur Baldwinson: Architecture, Gordon Institute of Technology, Geelong	Born Kallaroo 26 February 1908; Died Royal North Shore Hospital 25 August 1969	Worked with: Raymond McGrath (London); E Maxwell Fry & Walter Gropius (London); Stephenson & Meldrum (Sydney); Partners: John Oldham; Charles Sylvester-Booth; Charles Peters; Geoffrey Twibill	Post-War International	Coomaditchy Lagoon housing project, Port Kembla (1938); Collins House, Palm Beach (1938); Kingsford Smith House, Pittwater (1939); Maritime Services Board ferry wharves, Manly and Circular Quay (1940); Foot/Haxton House, Clareville (1949); Max Dupain House, Castlecrag (1952); Baldwinson House, Greenwich (1953); Hotel Belmont, Belmont (1956) Sulman Medal
James Barnet: Apprenticed to a builder; Studied drawing and design under William Dyce; Studied architecture with Charles James Richardson	Born Arbroath, Scotland 1827; Arrived Australia December 1854; Died Sydney 16 December 1904	Clerk of Works, University of Sydney; NSW Colonial Architect (1862–90); New South Wales	Victorian Italianate; Victorian Free Classical; Victorian Mannerist	Defence works, Port Jackson, Botany Bay and Newcastle; Courthouses, lock-ups, police stations and post offices throughout New South Wales; Macquarie Lighthouse, replacement, Vaucluse; Australian Museum, College Street, Sydney; General Post Office, Sydney; Colonial Secretary's Office, Macquarie Street, Sydney; Lands Department, Bridge Street, Sydney; Customs House, Sydney; Medical School, University of Sydney; Callan Park Lunatic Asylum, Rozelle; Tarban Creek Asylum, Gladesville; Garden Palace, Royal Botanic Gardens, Sydney
Nahum Barnet: Early career as insurance clerk; Articled to Terry and Oakden	Born Swanston Street, Melbourne 16 August 1855; Died St Kilda 1 September 1931	Worked with John Harry Grainger; Victoria	Victorian Free Gothic; Federation Free Classical; Inter-War Academic Classical	Her Majesty's Theatre, Melbourne; Auditorium, Collins Street, Melbourne; Austral Building, Collins Street, Melbourne; Wertheim Piano Factory; Melbourne Synagogue, Toorak Road, South Yarra (1928)
Hillson Beasley	Born Canterbury, Kent, England 30 April 1855; Died Albany, Western Australia 7 October 1936	Principal Architect (Western Australia) 1905–17; Western Australia	Federation Romanesque; Federation Free Style; Federation Arts & Crafts	Swan Barracks, Perth (1898); Fremantle Post Office, Market Street, Fremantle (1907); Perth Modern School, West Building, Roberts Road, Subiaco (1910)
Guilford Marsh Bell: Articled to Lange L Powell; Architecture, Central Technical College; Studied under Professor Sir Albert Richardson, London	Born Brisbane 21 December 1912; Died Melbourne 9 January 1992	John A. La Gerche; Partners: Neil Clerehan; Graham Fisher; Victoria and New South Wales	Post War International; Post War Melbourne Regional; Late 20th century Stripped Classical; Late 20th century International	ANA Air Terminal, Philip Street, Sydney (1948); Hayman Island Resort, Hayman Island, Queensland (1952); Hordern House, Point Piper (1956) demolished; Santosa, Albany Road, Toorak (1963); Myer House, Yulgibar Station, Grafton (1966) restoration and alteration; Gordon House, Birkenburn Station, Bungendore (1968); Fairfax Pavilion, Retford Park, Bowral (1969)
William G. Bennett	Born 1896; Died 1977	Western Australia	Inter-War Art Deco	Regal Theatre, Subiaco; Gledden Building, Perth; Raffles Hotel, Applecross; Plaza Theatre, Perth; Beaucott Buildings, Mount Lawley; Nedlands Park Masonic Hall, Nedlands
Raymond Berg	Born 25 October 1913; Died 1989			RAIA Gold Medal (1974)
John Bibb	Born 1810; Died 1862			
James Birrell	Born 1928; Died 2019	Queensland		RAIA Gold Medal (2005)
James Blackburn	Born 1803; Died 1854		Old Colonial Grecian; Old Colonial Gothic Picturesque; Victorian Italianate; Victorian Romanesque; Victorian Rustic Gothic	Church Ruin, Port Arthur (1836); St Mark's Anglican Church, Pontville (1841); St Matthew's Presbyterian Church, Glenorchy; Congregational church, New Town (1842); Lady Franklin Museum, Lenah (1843); The Grange, Campbelltown (1840s)
Arthur Blacket	Born Sydney 1848; Died 1929	Blackett & Son; Blacket Brothers (1883–85); New South Wales	Victorian Romanesque	
Cyril Blacket	Born Sydney 1857; Died Manly 1937	Blacket & Son; Blacket Brothers (1883–85); New South Wales	Victorian Academic Gothic; Victorian Romanesque	All Saints Anglican Church, tower addition, Bodalla (1901)
Edmund Blacket	Born Surrey 25 August 1817; Arrived Australia 1842; Died Petersham 9 February 1883	NSW Colonial Architect (1849–54); Blacket & Sons; New South Wales	Victorian Academic Gothic; Victorian Free Gothic; Victorian Rustic Gothic	Great Hall University of Sydney; St Paul's College, Sydney; Anglican Churches, St Mark's Church, Darling Point, St Paul's Redfern, St Philip's Church, Sydney, St Paul's Carcoar, St Mary's West Maitland, St Paul's Burwood St Stephen's Newtown All Saints' Woollahra, St Saviour's Goulburn, St Peter's East Maitland, St Thomas' Anglican Church, North Sydney and St Stephen's Willoughby
William Blackett	Born 1873; Died 1962			
Carl Heinrich Edmund Blackmann	Born 1835; Died c. 1912			
Gorrie Blair	Born Scotland 1862	NSW Government Architect (1923–26); New South Wales		Several NSW War Memorials; Court House, Katoomba; Wards 24 and 25, Callan Park
Harold Boas	Born Adelaide 27 September 1883; Died Subiaco 17 September 1980	M. F. Cavanagh & Austin Bastow; Oldham, Boas, Ednie-Brown & Partners; Western Australia		King's Picture Theatre (1905); Nedlands Park Hotel (1907); Radio station 6WF (1924); Edith Dircksey Cowan Memorial (1934); Emu Brewery (1938); Adelphi Hotel; London Court (1937); Gledden Building (1938)
Robin Boyd	Born 1917; Died 1971	Grounds, Romberg & Boyd	Post-War Melbourne Regional	RAIA Gold Medal (1969)
Alfred Brown	Born 1893; Died 1976			
Henry Budden CBE: Articled to Harry Kent; Architecture, Sydney Technical College; Royal Academy	Born Rockley, New South Wales 11 August 1871; Died Sydney 25 December 1944	Sir Austin Webb; Kent & Budden (1899–1912); Kent Budden & Greenwell (1912–19); Budden & Greenwell (1919–22); H E Budden (1922-40); Budden & Nangle (1940–44); New South Wales	Federation Arts and Crafts; Federation Bungalow; Inter-War Stripped Classical; Inter-War Art Deco	Houses at 41 & 43 Woolwich Road, Hunters Hill (1898); Houses at 2 & 4 Prince Edward Parade, Hunters Hill (1898); Houses at 1 & 3 Prince Edward Parade, Hunters Hill (1912); Emu Creek, Emu Creek Road, Walcha (1908); Mothers and Wives Memorial to Soldiers Woolloomooloo (1922); David Jones, Elizabeth Street, Sydney (1925); Brassey House, Barton ACT (1927); Railways House, 19 York Street, Sydney (1936) Sulman Medal; Transport House, Macquarie Street, Sydney (1938); Metropolitan Water Sewerage & Drainage Board Building, Pitt Street, Sydney (1939)
Eva Buhrich	Born in Nuremberg, Germany, in 1915; Arrived in Australia in 1939; Died in March 1976	Hans Poelzig's office (Berlin); Otto Salvisberg's office (Zurich)		Buhrich House II
Hugh Buhrich	Born Hamburg, Germany 25 April 1911; Died Castlecrag, New South Wales 18 June 2004		Modernist	Buhrich House II, 375 Edinburgh Road, Castlecrag; Point Piper House, Point Piper
Walter Bunning CMG: Architecture, Sydney Technical College; Town Planning, Regent Street Polytechnic, London	Born South Brisbane 19 May 1912; Died Bondi Junction 13 October 1977	Carlyle Greenwell; Stephenson & Meldrum; H Ruskin Rowe; Bunning & Madden; New South Wales and Australian Capital Territory	Post-War & Late 20th century International; Late 20th century Stripped Classical	Bunning House, Ryrie Street, Mosman (1952); ANZAC House, College Street, Sydney (1957) RIBA Bronze Medal; Liner House, Bridge Street, Sydney (1962) Sir John Sulman Medal; Bruce Hall, Australian National University (1961); International House, University of Sydney (1967); National Library of Australia (1968); Homes in the Sun (Published 1945)
Gregory Burgess			Late 20th century Post-Modern	RAIA Gold Medal (2004)
Graeme Butler: Architecture, University of Melbourne (1972)	Born Melbourne	Yuncken Freeman Architects (YFA)	Late 20th century Post-Modern	Austin Hospital ward block fit-out (1973); Toorak Teachers College library and theatre building under YFA partner Roy Simpson; Pioneering recycling of the Henry Jones Jam Factory Chapel Street, Prahran, under McIntyre & McIntyre (opened 1975); Museum Underground railway station fit-out and MURLA graphics documentation, with Perrott Lyon Timlock & Kesa, under associate David Simpson (completed 1980)
Walter Butler: Articled to Alexander Lauder (Barnstaple)	Born Somerset, England 24 March 1864; Arrived Australia 1888; Died 1949	J D Sedding (London) Partners; Beverley Ussher; George Inskip; Ernest Bradshaw; Richard Butler (Nephew); Marcus Martin; Hugh Pettit	Federation Arts & Crafts	Residences in Victoria; Anglican Cathedral, Wangaratta (1907); Christ Church Anglican, Benalla (1910); Collins House, Melbourne (1910); Queensland Insurance Building, Melbourne (1911); Edzell, additions, St Georges Road, Toorak (1917); Coombe Cottage, lodge and gatehouse, Coldstream (1925); Bank branches for the Union Bank of Australia; Modern Architectural Design (published 1902); Healthy Homes (published 1902)
Stroma Buttrose	Born 29 October 1929; Died 26 February 2020	South Australia		

Return to top of page

== C ==
Architect and education	Birth, immigration and death	Firms, institutions and geographical locations	Architectural style	Notable buildings and awards
Michael Cavanagh: Associate, Royal Institute of British Architects (1888); Inaugural vice-president, West Australia Institute of Architects (1896)	Born Beechworth, Victoria 1860; Died Subiaco, Western Australia 29 May 1941	Cavanagh & Cavanagh; Western Australia	Federation Filigree; Federation Gothic; Romanesque Revival	Roman Catholic Archbishop's Palace, Perth; Redemptorist Monastery, North Perth; St John of God Sisters' Hospital and Convent, Subiaco; St Patrick's Basilica, Fremantle; St Mary's Cathedral, Perth; Central Fire Station, Perth; Fremantle Fire Station, Fremantle; Great Western (Brass Monkey) Hotel, Perth; Esplanade Hotel, Perth; Orient Hotel, Fremantle; P&O Hotel, Fremantle
J. Burcham Clamp: Articled to H C Kent; Architecture, Sydney Technical College; Architecture Lectures, University of Sydney	Born George Street, Sydney 30 November 1869; Died Cremorne 7 July 1931	Partners: T M Smith; Walter Burley Griffin; C H Mackellar; C H Finch; John Clamp (son)	Inter-War Old English; Inter-War Chicagoesque	Shore Chapel, North Sydney; St Matthew's Anglican Church, Manly (with Wright and Apperly); Church of England Boys' Home, Carlingford; Canberra Grammar School; Ainslie Hotel, Canberra
Ross Chisholm	Born 4 July 1931; Died Perth, Western Australia 27 September 1998	Powell Cameron & Chisholm; Cameron Chisholm Nicol (CCN Architects); Australia	Late 20th century Stripped Classical; Late 20th century Perth Regional; Late 20th century Brutalist; Late 20th century Late Modern	Reid Library, University of Western Australia, Crawley (1964); National Carillon, Canberra (1970); Allendale Square, St Georges Terrace, Perth (1976); Fire Brigades Board Headquarters, Hay Street, Perth (1986); RAIA Gold Medal (1983)
John James Clark: Prime instructor in architecture, Pritchard of Smith and Pritchard Architects	Born Liverpool, England 23 January 1838; Arrived Australia 10 March 1852; Died St Kilda, Victoria 25 June 1915	Colonial Architect's Office, Victoria (1852–78); Private practice, Collins Street, Melbourne (1880); Private practice with engineer brother, George Clark, Sydney (1881–83); Colonial Architect, Queensland (1883–85); Public Works Department. Western Australia (1896–1898); Private practice with E J Clark (son), Australia (1897–1915); Australia, New Zealand	Victorian Italianate; Victorian Academic Classical; Victorian Free Classical; Federation Gothic; Federation Free Style	Geelong Customs House (1855); Old Treasury Building, Melbourne (1857–62); Royal Mint, Melbourne (1869–72); Townsville Post Office, Queensland (1885–1888); Treasury Building, Brisbane (1889); City Baths, Melbourne (1903); Auckland Town Hall, New Zealand (1908); Melbourne Hospital (1910–1916)
Marshall Clifton	Born Wokalup, Western Australia 11 September 1903; Died Mosman Park, Western Australia 3 December 1975	Clifton Parry; Clifton Leach	Inter-War (Spanish Mission); International style	Captain Stirling Hotel, Nedlands (1935); The Clifton house, Johnston Street, Mosman Park (1937); Day House, Victoria Avenue, Claremont (1939); Faculty of Arts Building, University of Western Australia (1962)
John Collier	Born 1895; Died 1968			
Arnold Conrad CMG: Articled to Edwin Ruck; Architecture, Working Men's College, Melbourne	Born Clifton Hill 6 January 1887; Died Auchenflower 3 February 1979	Queensland Department of Public Works (1911); H W Atkinson & C McLay (1912–17); Atkinson & Conrad (1919–26); Atkinson, Powell & Conrad (1926–38); Conrad Gargett (1938–74); Queensland	Inter-War Spanish mission	Trades Hall, Brisbane; Craigston, Spring Hill (1928); Brisbane General Hospital; Brisbane General Hospital, nurses' quarters; Tristram's soft-drink factory; Greek Orthodox Church; Courier-Mail Building (1936 with Stephenson & Meldrum); St John's Cathedral, organ loft, Brisbane (1974)
George Cookney	Born England	NSW Colonial Architect 1825–26	Old Colonial Gothick Picturesque	La Perouse Memorial, Botany Bay; Stables, Vaucluse House, Vaucluse (c.1829)
Trainee architect under C. R. Cockerell; Trainee civil engineer under C. B. Vignolles	Born London 1822; Arrived Australia 1852; Died 1898	Queensland		Old Brisbane Town Hall, Brisbane
Bill Corker		Denton Corker Marshall; Australia and International		Melbourne Museum; Melbourne Convention & Exhibition Centre; Bolte Bridge; Visitors Centre, Stonehenge; Australian Embassy, Tokyo; Australian Embassy, Beijing; Governor Phillip Tower & Museum of Sydney; Australian War Memorial, Extension; RAIA Gold Medal (1996)
Peter Corrigan	Born 6 May 1941; Died 1 December 2016			RAIA Gold Medal (2003)
Keith Cottier	Born Australia 1938	Allen Jack+Cottier Architects Pty Ltd; Australia	Sydney School; Late 20th century modernist; Heritage and adaptive reuse	Penfolds Magill Estate Winery, Adelaide, South Australia; Moore Park Gardens, Sydney, New South Wales; RAIA Gold Medal (2001)
Philip Cox	Born Australia 1939	Ian McKay & Philip Cox; Philip Cox & Partners; Philip Cox, Richardson, Taylor & Associates; New South Wales and Australian Capital Territory	Late 20th century Structuralist; Late 20th century Post Modern	National Maritime Museum, Darling Harbour; Sydney Exhibition Centre, Darling Harbour; Sydney Football Stadium, Moore Park; RAIA Gold Medal (1984)
Matthew Crawford	Born Western Australia 1969	Matthew Crawford Architects		Hougoumont Hotel, Fremantle; School of Early Learning, North Perth; Warders Hotel, National Heritage, Fremantle
Hugh Ralston Crawford	Born United States 1876–1954)	Practised both as an engineer and architect in Australia and the United States in the first half of the 20th century		

Return to top of page

== D ==
Architect and education	Birth, immigration and death	Firms, institutions and geographical locations	Architectural style	Notable buildings and awards
John Dalton	1927–2007	John Dalton Architect and Associates, Brisbane	responsive designs for the subtropical climate	TAFE Hall of Residence, Kelvin Grove
Alexander Dawson		NSW Colonial Architect (1856–62); New South Wales	Victorian Tudor	Supreme Court of New South Wales Registry Office, Elizabeth Street, Sydney
Charles D'Ebro	1850–1920	Jenkins, D'Ebro and Grainger; Melbourne	Victorian Free Classical; Victorian Academic Gothic; Federation Free Style	Stonnington (1890); Winfield Building (1891); Richmond Power Station (1891); Gollin Building (1902); Scottish House (1908)
Bruce Dellit: Architecture, Sydney Technical College; Architecture Lectures, University of Sydney	Born Darlington 7 November 1898; Died Hornsby 21 August 1942	Hall & Prentice; Spain & Cosh; Bruce Dellit; Queensland and New South Wales	Inter-War Art Deco; Inter-War Mediterranean	Design Team, Brisbane City Hall; Aleuria, Fox Valley Road, Wahroonga (1928); Kyle House, Macquarie Place, Sydney (1931); Kinsella's Chapel, Bourke Street, Darlinghurst; Anzac War Memorial, Hyde Park, Sydney (1934); Delfin House, O'Connell Street, Sydney
John Denton		Denton Corker Marshall; Australia and International		Melbourne Museum; Melbourne Convention & Exhibition Centre; Bolte Bridge; Visitors Centre, Stonehenge; Australian Embassy, Tokyo; Australian Embassy, Beijing; Governor Phillip Tower & Museum of Sydney; Australian War Memorial, Extension; RAIA Gold Medal (1996)
Robin Dods: Architecture, Edinburgh Architectural Association	Born Dunedin 9 June 1868; Arrived Australia via Scotland 1879; Died Edgecliff 23 July 1920	Hay & Henderson (Edinburgh); Sir Aston Webb (London); Hall & Dods (Brisbane); Spain & Cosh (Sydney); Queensland and New South Wales	Federation Gothic; Federation Arts and Crafts; Federation Bungalow; Inter-War Georgian Revival	Webber House, Ann Street, Brisbane (1905); Archbishop's Chapel, Milton; Australian Mercantile Land & Finance building, Brisbane; St Brigid's Catholic Church, Red Hill (1914); Fenton, Albert Street, Edgecliff
Hedley Allen Dunn	Born 27 October 1865, North Adelaide; Died 5 June 1942	Adelaide, South Australia		

Return to top of page

== E ==
Architect and education	Birth, immigration and death	Firms, institutions and geographical locations	Architectural style	Notable buildings and awards
William Henry Ellerker	Died 1891	Melbourne, Victoria		
Russell Ellis	Born 20 August 1912; Died 2 February 1988		Modernist	
Sir Bernard Evans DSO	Born 13 May 1905; Died 19 February 1981	Bernard Evans & Partners; Lord Mayor of Melbourne (1961–63); Victoria and Western Australia	Inter-War Old English; Inter-War Functionalist; Post-War International	Toorak Village, Toorak Road, Toorak (1936); London Court, Hay Street, Perth (1937); Former John Batman Motor Inn, 69 Queens Road, South Melbourne; The Stamford Hotel, Rowville (1959); 505 St Kilda Road, Melbourne (1960); CRA House, 95 Collins Street, Melbourne (1960); Victoria

Return to top of page

== F ==
Architect and education	Birth, immigration and death	Firms, institutions and geographical locations	Architectural style	Notable buildings and awards
Ted Farmer		NSW Government Architect (1958–73); New South Wales		RAIA Gold Medal (1972)
Joseph Fowell: Articled to F. E. Banham (Beccles, Suffolk); Completed training with Travers & Mileham (London)	Born Albany 2 August 1891; Returned to Australia 1919; Died Bayview 3 July 1970	Gibson, Skipworth & Gordon (London); Atkinson & Alexander (London); Leslie Wilkinson; Henry Budden; Fowell and McConnel (1928–39); Fowell and Mansfield (1939–46); Fowell, Mansfield & Maclurcan (1946–62); Fowell, Mansfield, Jarvis & Maclurcan (1962–70)	Inter-War Art Deco; Inter-War Romanesque; Post-War Ecclesiastical	British Medical Association House, 135–137 Macquarie Street, Sydney (1928); St Anne's Shrine, Blair & Mitchell Streets, North Bondi (nave 1935, sanctuary 1964); St Peter's, Church of England, Proston, Queensland (1937); St Mary's, North Sydney (1939); St Canisus College, Pymble (1939); St Joseph's, Neutral Bay (1941); Orient Line Building, 2–6 Spring Street, Sydney (1943); St Augustine's Church, Yass (1956); P&O, 565 Hunter Street, Sydney (1962); Gladesville Bridge, Parramatta River (1965); Church of St Rose, Rose Street, Collaroy Plateau (1967); RAIA Gold Medal (1962)

Return to top of page

== G ==
Architect and education	Birth, immigration and death	Firms, institutions and geographical locations	Architectural style	Notable buildings and awards
Robin Gibson	Born 15 May 1930; Died 28 March 2014	Robin Gibson and Partners; Queensland	Late 20th century International	Queensland Performing Arts Centre, Brisbane (1984); RAIA Gold Medal (1989)
Romaldo Giurgola: University of Rome La Sapienza; Columbia University	Born Rome, 1920; Arrived Australia, 1980; Died Canberra, 2016	Mitchell/Giurgola Architects; Mitchell/Giurgola & Thorp; USA and Australia	Late 20th century International	United Fund Headquarters Building, Philadelphia (1971); Columbus East High School, Columbus (1972); Lang Music Building, Swarthmore College, Swarthmore (1973); Tredyffrin Public Library, Strafford (1976); Sherman Fairchild Center Columbia University (1977); Parliament House, Canberra (1988); INA Tower, Philadelphia; Swissotel, Boston (1985); Casa Thomas Jefferson, Brasília; Penn Mutual Tower, Philadelphia; AIA Gold Medal (1982); RAIA Gold Medal (1988)
John Harry Grainger	Born: Westminster, London 30 November 1854; Died: Melbourne 1917	Principal Architect (Western Australia) 1897–1905		Fremantle Town Hall; Government House ballroom; Supreme Court; Perth Museum, Library and Art Gallery; Parliament House, Perth; Perth Central Police Courts
Francis Greenway	Born Bristol 1777; Arrived Sydney 1814; Died Maitland 1837	NSW Colonial Architect 1816–22; Bristol and New South Wales	Old Colonial Georgian; Old Colonial Regency; Old Colonial Gothick Picturesque	First Macquarie Lighthouse, Vaucluse; Hyde Park Barracks, Sydney; St James Church, Sydney; Government House Stables, Sydney
Carlyle Greenwell: Architecture, Sydney Technical College; Architecture Lectures, Sydney University; BSc (Arch), Pennsylvania University	Born Windsor 16 March 1884; Died Collaroy 7 February 1961	Kent Budden & Greenwell; Budden & Greenwell; Greenwell & Shirley; New South Wales	Federation Arts and Crafts; Federation Bungalow; Inter War Mediterranean; Inter-War Gothic	Killara Congregational Church (Uniting Church); Yeulba, Strathfield; Terhyn Worthle, Killara; Norman House, Vaucluse; Harrison House (now Weis Restaurant), Toowoomba; Mothers and Wives Memorial to Soldiers, Woolloomooloo
Roy Grounds	Born 1905; Died 1981	Grounds, Romberg & Boyd; Australia	Post-War Melbourne Regional; Post-War International; Late 20th century Structuralist	Australian Academy of Science, Canberra (1959) Sir John Sulman Medal; National Gallery of Victoria; RAIA Gold Medal (1968)
Neville Gruzman	Born 1925; Died 2005		Regionalism, Sydney School, Organic Modernism	Hill's House (1966); Holland House (1962)

Return to top of page

== H ==
Architect and education	Birth, immigration and death	Firms, institutions and geographical locations	Architectural style	Notable buildings and awards
Winsome Hall Andrew	Born Woollahra, New South Wales 1905; Died 1997	Robert Atkinson's office; Stanley Livrock's office; New South Wales		Surf Pavilion, Manly
Ambrose Hallen	Born England; Arrived Australia 1827; Died en route to London 1845	NSW Colonial Architect 1832–34		Berrima Gaol
William Hardwick	Born: Rylstone, New South Wales December 1860; Died: South Perth, Western Australia 2 October 1941	Principal Architect (Western Australia) 1917–27		Wyndham Meatworks, General Post Office, Perth; Albany Senior High School; Bunbury Senior High School; Northam Senior High School; Heathcoate Hospital
Standish Harris	Born England	NSW Colonial Architect 1822–24		
Eric Heath	Born Junee 1894; Died Sydney 23 September 1952	Eric Heath; Laurie & Heath (1936–1952); New South Wales	Inter-War Spanish Mission; Inter-War Mediterranean; Inter-War Georgian Revival	Plaza Theatre, Sydney (1930); House, Gordon (1940)
Anketell Henderson: Articled to Reed & Barnes; Engineering, University of Melbourne	Born Cork 3 March 1853; Arrived Australia 1863; Died Melbourne 15 November 1922	Reed, Henderson & Smart (1883–90); Anketell Henderson (1890–1906)		
Kingsley Henderson CMG: Articled to Anketell Henderson; Combined Architecture course, University of Melbourne and Melbourne Technical College	Born Brighton, Victoria 15 December 1883; Died Portsea, Victoria 6 April 1942	Firms; Anketell and K Henderson (1906–20); Anketell and K Henderson, Alsop & Martin (1920–24); A & K Henderson (1924–42); Partners: John Freeman; R Jack Wilson; R Cedric Staughton; W H Lacey; L C Pillar; Australia and New Zealand	Inter-War Commercial Palazzo	Alcaston House, Spring Street, Melbourne (1930); Lyric House, Collins Street, Melbourne (1931) RVIA Victorian Street Architecture Medal; Shell Corner, William Street, Melbourne (1935) RVIA Victorian Street Architecture Medal; Numerous office buildings for the T & G Mutual Life Assurance Society in Australia and New Zealand in the 1920s and 1930s
Jack Hennessy	Born 1853; Died 1924			
Jack Hennessy, junior	Born 1887; Died 1955			
Kerry Hill	Born 1943; Died 26 August 2018	Kerry Hill Architects		Ogilvie House, Sunshine Beach, Queensland (2003) Robin Boyd Award; RAIA Gold Medal (2006)
John Hipwell	Born 30 November 1920; Death 16 June 2007	Hipwell, Weight & Mason; Hipwell, Weight & Ross; Department of Works		Hipwell House Research Road Warrandyte
Lieutenant General Sir Talbot Hobbs KCMG, KCB	Born London 1864; Arrived Australia 1886; Died en route to France 1938	Firm; Hobbs, Smith & Forbes; Partners; Athol Hobbs (son); Alec Winning; Western Australia	Federation Queen Anne; Federation Bungalow; Inter-War Gothic/Collegiate Tudor	Weld Club, Barrack Street, Perth (1892); War Memorial, Kings Park, Perth (1929)
John Horbury Hunt	Born Saint John October 1838; Arrived Australia January 1863; Died Darlinghurst 27 December 1904	Charles F Sleeper; Edward Clarke Cabot; Edmund Blacket (1863–69); John Horbury Hunt (1869–1904); Boston and New South Wales	Victorian Academic Gothic; Victorian Free Gothic; Federation Arts & Crafts	St Peter's Anglican Cathedral, Armidale (1871); St Matthias's Church, Denman (1871); St John's, Branxton (1873); Christ Church Anglican Cathedral, Grafton (1880); Tivoli, Rose Bay (1881); St Luke's Osborne Memorial Church, Dapto (1882); Cloncorrick, Darling Point (1884); Booloominbah, Armidale (1888); Camelot, Narellan (1888); Pibrac, Warrawee (1888); Tudor House, Moss Vale (1891); Convent of the Sacred Heart, Rose Bay (1896); Trevenna, Armidale (1898); Highlands, Wahroonga (1893)
Henry Hunter	Born Nottingham, England October 1832; Arrived Australia 1846; Died Brisbane 17 October 1892	Crawford Padas Shurman Architects; Alan Cameron Walker (apprentice); Leslie Corrie (apprentice/partner); Brisbane and Tasmania	Neo-Renaissance; Gothic-revival	Hobart Town Hall; parts of Tasmanian Museum and Art Gallery; Eagle Farm Racecourse; All Saints Anglican Church, South Hobart; AMP Building
Beatrice Hutton	Born The Folly, Lakes Creek, Queensland 16 July 1893; Died Indooroopilly, Brisbane 7 October 1990	Hockings and Palmer; Chambers and Hutton; Brisbane and Sydney		J.W.Dalzell Residence, Rockhampton; Myles House, Rockhampton; H Rudd Residence, Rockhampton; 'Ngarita', Bellevue Hill, Sydney; Brecknell Street, Rockhampton; New South Wales Masonic Club building; Sirius House, Macquarie Place

Return to top of page

== I ==
Architect and education	Birth, immigration and death	Firms, institutions and geographical locations	Architectural style	Notable buildings and awards
James Campbell Irwin	Born 23 June 1906; Died 22 June 1990			
Leighton Irwin	9 November 1892 (Eastwood, Adelaide, South Australia); 4 August 1962 (Richmond, Melbourne, Victoria)	Woods, Bagot, Laybourne-Smith & Irwin	Inter-war Functionalist	Royal Australasian College of Surgeons, Melbourne, Victoria
Iwan Iwanoff	2 July 1919 (Küsstendil (Kusestendil), Bulgaria); 2 March 1950 (Fremantle, Western Australia); 7 October 1986 (Perth, Western Australia)	Krantz and Sheldon; Studio of Iwan Iwanoff	Late 20th century Brutalist architecture	

Return to top of page

== J ==
Architect and education	Birth, immigration and death	Firms, institutions and geographical locations	Architectural style	Notable buildings and awards
Daryl Jackson AO	Born on 7 February 1937 in Clunes, Victoria, Australia; Died on 21 February 2026	Jackson Architecture 1965 – Current	Brutalist; Modernist	RAIA Gold Medal (1987); Sir Zelman Cowen Award for Public Architecture, 1981 & 1984; Victoria University Tower; Melbourne Cricket Ground (MCG) Northern and Southern Stands.; Olivia Newton-John Cancer and Wellness Centre; Docklands Stadium, Marvel Stadium (2019)
E. Jeaffreson Jackson: Fellow, Royal Institute of British Architects (1900)	Born London 1862	Colonial Architect's Office of NSW (1884) (1902–1908); partner with J. S. Edwards (1885) (Sydney)	Arts and Crafts	Hanney, Alfred Street, Cammeray (1888–1891); Hollowforth, Neutral Bay (1893); 28 Mistral Avenue, Mosman (1900); Rectory, St Thomas', North Sydney; Kelrose, North Sydney (1903); Hastings, Neutral Bay (1904 attrib)
Harry Jefferis: Articled to Harry Kent; Associate, Royal Institute of British Architects	Born Adelaide 1867; Died Albany, Western Australia 1947	Harry Kent (Sydney); Potts Sulman and Hennings (London); Thomas Edward Collcutt (London); Jefferis Henderson (Perth); Harry Jefferis; Western Australia		
Richard Roach Jewell	Born Devon 1810; Arrived Australia 1852; Died Perth 1891	Colonial Architect and Clerk of Works; Western Australia		Perth Gaol (1854); Government House, Perth (1859); Barracks Arch (1863); Perth Town Hall (1868)
Prof Peter Johnson AC: Architecture, University of Sydney	Died 2003	McConnel Smith and Johnson; Dean of Architecture, University of Sydney; New South Wales and Australian Capital Territory		Kindersley House, Bligh Street, Sydney; Water Board Building, Bathurst Street, Sydney (1962); Johnson House, Chatswood (1963) Wilkinson Award; Commonwealth State Law Courts, Queens Square, Sydney 1967; Benjamin Offices, Belconnen (1981); RAIA Gold Medal (1985)
George Sydney Jones (architect): Architecture, London; Associate, Royal Institute of British Architects (1890)	Born Sydney 1868; Died NSW 1927	George Sydney Jones 1891–1927	Arts and Crafts	Trinity Congregational Church, Strathfield (1889); Springfort, Strathfield (1894); Darenth, Strathfield (1895); Bickley, Strathfield (1894); Treghre, Strathfield (1899); Luleo, Strathfield (1912); Fellow NSW Institute 1896–1901; Editor Art & Architecture 1909–1912; President NSW Institute of Architects (1912–1914 & 1920–1921)
Howard Joseland	Born Worcestershire 14 January 1860; Arrived Australia via New Zealand 1888; Died Darlinghurst 20 July 1930	Haddon Bros (Hereford); George Trollope & Sons (London); Joseland & Vernon (1903–14); Howard Joseland (1914–19); Joseland & Gilling (1919–23); New South Wales		Westholme, 1 Water Street, Wahroonga (1894); Redleaf, Wahroonga (1899) Restoration (1996) RAIA Lachlan Macqaurie Award; Craignairn, 37 Burns Road, Wahroonga (1909); National Building, Pitt Street, Sydney (1920); Tobacco Company Administration Building, 50 Todman Avenue, Kensington (1926)

Return to top of page

== K ==
Architect and education	Birth, immigration and death	Firms, institutions and geographical locations	Architectural style	Notable buildings and awards
Peter Kaad	Born Fiji 28 February 1897; Died Gold Coast, Queensland 1967	Ross & Rowe; Hall & Prentice; Commonwealth Works Department; Lipson & Kaad	Inter-War Functionalist	Design Team, Brisbane City Hall; Rural Bank, Martin Place, Sydney (1935 – demolished 1983); Hastigs Deering Motors (now City Ford), Woolloomooloo (1938); Packard Showroom, East Sydney (1938)
Anatol Kagan	Born Saint Petersburg 4 October 1913; Died Sydney 2009	Blumin & Kagan; Department of Works & Housing; Anatol Kagan & Associates	Inter-War Functionalist; Post-War International	Mount Scopus Memorial College, Burwood, Victoria (1953–60); Sydney Opera House – unplaced competition entry (1957)
Nonda Katsalidis	Born 1951 (Athens, Greece)	Tom Kovac		Ian Potter Museum of Art (Victorian Architecture Medal, Melbourne Prize and William Wardell Award 1999; Eureka Tower
Lindsay Kelly		NSW Government Architect (1988–95); New South Wales		
Henry Hardie Kemp	Born 10 March 1859 in Broughton, Lancashire; Died 22 April 1946 in Kew, Melbourne	Ussher and Kemp	Federation Queen Anne; Federation Arts and Crafts	Queen's College, University of Melbourne; Queen's Coffee Palace, Carlton (1889, demolished); Australian Property and Investment Co. Building, corner of Elizabeth Street and Flinders Lane (1887, demolished); Workingmen's College (1888); Woodlands for Alex McCracken, North Essendon (1888); Highbury Grove manse, Kew; A pair of residences at 117 Princess Street and 1 Fellows Street, Kew; Kerang Shire Office, formerly a bank; The Priory, Gladesville (1857), with William Weaver

Return to top of page

== L ==
Architect and education	Birth, immigration and death	Firms, institutions and geographical locations	Architectural style	Notable buildings and awards
William Laurie	Born 11 August 1902 Dumfriesshire, Scotland; Arrived in Australia via Canary Islands 1911; Died 22 August 1970 Sydney	Laurie & Heath; New South Wales		RAIA Gold Medal (1966)
Robert Lawson	Born 1833 Scotland; Died 1902 New Zealand	New Zealand; Melbourne 1854–1862 and 1890–1900	Victorian Gothic	Earlsbrae Hall, Essendon, Victoria (1890); now known as Lowther Hall, it forms part of an Anglican grammar school
Louis Laybourne Smith	Born 1880 Unley, South Australia; Died 1965 Adelaide, South Australia	School of Mines, South Australia; Woods, Bagot, Jory & Laybourne Smith		National War Memorial, Adelaide; Repatriation General Hospital, Daw Park; RAIA Gold Medal (1961)
William T. Leighton	Born 1905; Died 1990	Western Australia	Art-Deco	Former State Theatre (Astor Cinema), Mount Lawley; Former Como Theatre (Cygnet Cinema), Como; Piccadilly Theatre and Arcade, Perth; Windsor Theatre, Nedlands
Richard Leplastrier	Born 1939, Melbourne, Australia	New South Wales		RAIA Gold Medal (1999)
Jiri Lev	Born 1979; Immigrated 2005	New South Wales, Tasmania	Traditional; Contextual	Tasmanian House open source housing
Mortimer Lewis	Born London 1796; Died Sydney 1879	NSW Colonial Architect 1835–49		Berrima Courthouse; Darlinghurst Courthouse
David Surrey Littlemore	Born 23 June 1910 Bundaberg, Queensland; Died 10 September 1989 Longueville, South Wales	Lovell Chen	Restoration	Royal Exhibition Building (1983–2004); State Library of Victoria (1985– 2011); Immigration Museum, Melbourne (1997– 2003); Young and Jackson Hotel (1999– 2003)
Clive Lucas	Born 1943 Australia	Clive Lucas Stapleton Partners	Restoration	

Return to top of page

== M ==
Architect and education	Birth, immigration and death	Firms, institutions and geographical locations	Architectural style	Notable buildings, awards and publications
Robert Henry Macdonald	Born Melbourne 1875; Died Canada 1942	Canada		Many landmark buildings in Canada
Raymond McGrath: English and Architecture, University of Sydney; Architecture, Clare College, Cambridge	Born Gladesville 7 March 1903; Left Australia 1926; Died Dublin 23 December 1977	Worked with Serge Chermayeff and Wells Coates; Architect, Public Works, Dublin (1940–46); Principal Architect, Public Works, Dublin (1946–68); Professor of Architecture, Royal Hibernian Academy; England and Ireland	Art Deco	Remodelling, Finella, Gonville and Caius College, Cambridge (1929); Interiors, BBC Broadcasting House, Portland Place, London (1931); St Ann's Hill House, Chertsey (1936); Land's End, Galby, Leicestershire; Various Irish Embassies abroad; Cenotaph, Leinster House, Dublin; Royal Hibernian Academy (1970); Glass in Architecture and Decoration (published 1937)
Peter McIntyre	Born 1927 Melbourne, Australia	McIntyre Partnership; Victoria	Post-War Melbourne Regional	Seahouse, Mornington (1983) Robin Boyd Award; RAIA Gold Medal (1990)
Charles McLay	Born circa 1860; Died Brisbane 1918	Queensland Government Architect's Office; Atkinson & McLay (1910–1918)		Customs House, Brisbane
George McRae	Born Edinburgh 1858; Arrived Australia 1884; Died Sydney 1923	City Architect Sydney (1886–97); Principal Assistant NSW Government Architect (1897–12); NSW Government Architect (1912–23); New South Wales	Federation Free Classical; Federation Anglo-Dutch; Federation Romanesque	Corn Exchange, 139–151 Sussex Street, Sydney (1887); Corporation Building, Hay Street, Sydney (1893); Queen Victoria Building, George Street, Sydney (1898); Department of Education Building, Sydney, New South Wales (1912); Parcels Post Office, Railway Square, Sydney (1913); Entrances and Elephant House, Taronga Zoo, Mosman; Court House, Cessnock
Colin Madigan	Born 1921; Died 2011	Edwards, Madigan, Torzillo & Briggs; New South Wales and Australian Capital Territory		High Court of Australia (1980); National Gallery of Australia (1982); RAIA Gold Medal (1981)
Barrie Marshall		Denton Corker Marshall; Australia and International		Melbourne Museum; Melbourne Convention & Exhibition Centre; Bolte Bridge; Visitors Centre, Stonehenge; Australian Embassy, Tokyo; Australian Embassy, Beijing; Governor Phillip Tower & Museum of Sydney; Australian War Memorial, Extension; RAIA Gold Medal (1996)
Marcus Martin	Born 1893; Died 1981	Partners: Rodney Alsop; Walter Butler; Kingsley Henderson; Victoria	Inter-War Spanish Mission; Inter-War Mediterranean; Inter-War Georgian Revival	Broome, 6 Glyndebourne Avenue, Toorak (1925); Maisonettes, Cnr Domain Road and Caroline Street, South Yarra (1925)
John Morphett	Born 1 August 1932; Died 25 March 2016			RAIA Gold Medal (2000)
Bryce Mortlock	Born 14 October 1921; Died 3 July 2004	Ancher Mortlock Murray & Woolley		RAIA Gold Medal (1979)
Elina Mottram	Born 1903; Died 1996		Tudor Revival	Scott Street Flats; Monkton, Corinda, Queensland (1925)
Peter Muller: B.Engineering, University of Adelaide (1948); M.Architecture, University of Philadelphia (1951)	Born Adelaide 1927; Died 2023	New South Wales; Bali	Mid 20th century Organic	Audette House, Edinburgh Road, Castlecrag (1952); Muller House, 42 Bynya Road, Whale Beach (1954); Richardson House, 949 Barrenjoey Road, Palm Beach (1956); McGrath House, 4 Dunara Gardens, Point Piper (1957); Richardson Ski Lodge, Threbo Village (1959); Hoyts Cinema Centre, Bourke Street, Melbourne (1967); Townhouses, Trelawney Street, Woollahra (1969); Dulhunty homestead, Nant Lodge, Glen Innes (1970); Bali Oberoi, Indonesia (1977–2001); Oberoi Kolva Beach resort Hotel, Goa, India (1980); Karnak Oberoi Hotel, Luxor, Egypt (1982); Oberoi Lombok, Indonesia (1997); Amandari Hotel Bali (1989)
Glenn Murcutt	Born London, 1936	New South Wales	Late 20th century Late Modern	RAIA Gold Medal, 1992; Alvar Aalto Medal, 1992; Pritzker Architecture Prize, 2002; American Institute of Architects Gold Medal, 2009; Praemium Imperiale, 2021
Nick Murcutt	Born 5 June 1964, London; Died 18 March 2011, Sydney	Neeson Murcutt	Late 20th century Late Modern	Wilkinson Award, 1997, 2007 & 2009; 2014 Sir John Sulman Medal for Public Architecture for Prince Alfred Park Pool and Park Upgrade; 2014 Lloyd Rees Award for Urban Design for Prince Alfred Park Pool and Park Upgrade

Return to top of page

== N ==
Architect and education	Birth, immigration and death	Firms, institutions and geographical locations	Architectural style	Notable buildings and awards
Peter Newell	Born 1916; Died 2010	Melbourne, Sydney, and Brisbane	Modernism	Modernist movement in the design of family homes in Queensland
Ellice Nosworthy	Born 1897; Died 1972		Early female architect in New South Wales	Kuringgai Municipal Council at Gordon
Harry Norris	Born 1888; Died 1966		Inter-war Functionalism	Burnham Beeches, Sherbrooke Road, Sherbrooke (1933); Mitchell House, Melbourne; G J Coles Building, Bourke Street, Melbourne; Nicholas Building, Melbourne

Return to top of page

== O ==
Architect and education	Birth, immigration and death	Firms, institutions and geographical locations	Architectural style	Notable buildings and awards
John Oldham OA: University of Western Australia; Melbourne University	Born Perth 1907; Died Perth 1997	Oldham, Boas and Ednie-Brown; Stephenson and Turner; WA State Government Landscape Architect		Australian Pavilion – 1939 New York World's Fair
Edwin Roy (Ted) Orchard	Born Sydney 1891; Died Sydney 1963	Sydney, New South Wales; Cairns, Queensland		Floriana (residence), Cairns North (1939), now listed on the Queensland Heritage Register; St David's Anglican Church, Mossman, now listed on the Queensland Heritage Register; Galada (residence), Cremorne
Eddie H. Oribin	Born Cairns 1927; Died 2016	In Practice with SG Barnes (1953–1959), and privately (to 1973); Far North Queensland		St Paul's Anglican Church, Proserpine (1958); Oribin house & studio (1958 & 1960); Mareeba Public Hall (1961); St Andrew's Presbyterian Memorial Church, Innisfail (constructed 1961); Oribin House, Stanthorpe (c.1980)
Sir John Overall CBE MC: Architecture, Sydney Technical College	Born Sydney 1913; Died 2001	Chief Architect, South Australian Housing Trust (1945–49); Partner, Overall and Walkley (1949–52); Chief Government Architect, Commonwealth Department of Works (1952–57); Commissioner, National Capital Development Commission (1958–72); Member, Parliament House Construction Authority (1979–85); South Australia; Australian Capital Territory		The Private Secretary's Cottage (Peppertree Cottage), Government House, Adelaide; RAIA Gold Medal (1982)

Return to top of page

== P ==
Architect and education	Birth, immigration and death	Firms, institutions and geographical locations	Architectural style	Notable buildings and awards
Cobden Parkes		NSW Government Architect (1935–58); New South Wales		RAIA Gold Medal (1964)
Varney Parkes	Born Ryde, New South Wales 4 June 1859; Died Sydney 14 May 1935	Blackmann & Parkes		
George Herbert Parry	Born 1882; Died 1947	Western Australia Public Works Department; Cavanagh & Cavanagh; Parry and Clifton; Western Australia	Inter-War Old English,	Chapel, Sister's Kate's Children's Home, Queens Park; St Mary the Virgin Church, South Perth; St Cuthbert's Anglican Church, Darlington
Barry Patten: Combined architecture course, Melbourne Technical College and University of Melbourne	Born Melbourne 1927; Died Melbourne 2003	Yuncken Freeman Brothers Griffiths & Simpson; Victoria		Sidney Myer Music Bowl; Former BHP Tower; Victorian State Offices
Susan Phillips	Born Adelaide 1958	Phillips Pilkington		Sir James Irwin President's Medal (2014)
William Pitt	Born 1855; Died 1918	Melbourne	Victorian Gothic; Victorian Second Empire	Olderfleet and Rialto Buildings Collins Street, Melbourne; Princess Theatre, Melbourne; Federal Coffee Palace, Melbourne; Empire Works, Richmond
Christopher Porter	Born 1801; Died 1874	Geelong, Ballarat, Brisbane		
Alex Popov	Born Shanghai 3 February 1942; Arrived Australia 1954	Jørn Utzon; Alex Popov and Associates	Late 20th century Modern	SCEGCGS Redlands Gym, Cremorne; Griffin House, Castlecrag
Albert Purchas	Born Chepstow, Monmouthshire, Wales 1825; Arrive Australia 1851; Died Kew 1909	Purchas & Swyer	Victorian Gothic	

Return to top of page

== R ==
Architect and education	Birth, immigration and death	Firms, institutions and geographical locations	Architectural style	Notable buildings and awards
Howard Raggatt		Ashton Raggatt McDougall	Postmodern	National Museum of Australia
Joseph Reed	Born c. 1823; Died 1890			
Bruce Rickard	Born 1929; Died 2010			
Lord Livingstone Ramsay	Born 1867; Died 1924	L L Livingstone	Federation Free Style	Dobroyde, Burwood (1913); School of Arts, Epping (1906–1916)
Frederick Romberg	Born 1913; Died 1992	Partners: Robin Boyd; Roy Grounds		
Thomas Rowe	Born Penzance, England 20 July 1829; Arrived Australia 1848; Died Darling Point 7 March 1899	Partners: W B Field; Sydney Green; Alfred Spain	Victorian	Presbyterian Church, Bathurst (1871); Great Synagogue, Elizabeth Street, Sydney (1874); Sydney Hospital, Macquarie Street, Sydney (1879); Newington College, Stanmore (1878)

Return to top of page

== S ==
Architect and education	Birth, immigration and death	Firms, institutions and geographical location	Architectural style	Notable buildings and awards
Thomas Pollard Sampson: Articled to A. E. Luttrell	Born Launceston, Tasmania 24 June 1875; Died Paddington 25 June 1961	T P Sampson; Herbert Dennis & T P Sampson; New South Wales	Federation Arts and Crafts; Federation Bungalow	Kama, Strathfield (1913); Romahapa, Centennial Park (1914); Concord Golf Club Clubhouse, Concord (1921); Western Suburbs Builders' Exchange, 353–355 Liverpool Road Ashfield (1929); Wallis Hall, Meriden School, Strathfield (1936)
Conrad Sayce	Born Hereford, England 1888; Arrived Australia 18??; Died Melbourne 1935	Alsop & Sayce; Victoria and Western Australia	Inter-War Mediterranean	Winthrop Hall, University of Western Australia
Harry Seidler	Born Vienna 25 June 1923; Arrived Australia 1948; Died Sydney 9 March 2006	Harry Seidler & Associates; Australia and International	Post-War International; Late 20th century International; Late 20th century Brutalist; Late 20th century Structuralist	Rose Seidler House, Wahroonga (1951) Sulman Medal; Blues Point Tower, Milsons Point (1961); Ski Lodge, Thredbo (1965) Wilkinson Award; Muller House Port Hacking (1966) Wilkinson Award; Australia Square Tower, George Street, Sydney (1967); Harry and Penelope Seidler House, Killara (1967) Wilkinson Award; MLC Centre, Martin Place, Sydney (1975) Sulman Medal; RAIA Gold Medal (1976); Offices, Glen Street, Milsons Point (1981) Sulman Medal; Riverside Centre, Brisbane (1986); Capita Centre, Sydney (1989); Grosvenor Place, George Street, Sydney (1991) Sulman Medal; Hamilton House, Sydney (1991); Horizon Apartments, Darlinghurst (1999) Wilkinson Award; Riparian Plaza, Brisbane (2005)
John Smedley: Articled to G. A. Mansfield	Born Sydney 4 March 1841; Died Shanghai 17 November 1903	New South Wales; Queensland	Victorian Italianate	Sydney Trades Hall, Sydney (1888); Stanmore Methodist Church, Newington College Chapel (1883, demolished 1975); Waterloo Town Hall (1880)
Ermin Smrekar	Born Trieste, Italy 1931; Arrived Australia 1956; Died 25 June 2016	Smrekar Architects; Victoria	Modernist	Lygon Lodge motel, Carlton (1967); Old Melbourne Hotel, North Melbourne (1970); Veneto Club, Bulleen (1972)
Alfred Louis Smith	Born 1830; Died 1907	Smith & Johnson		
Edwin Smith		NSW Government Architect (1929–35); New South Wales		
Douglas Snelling	Born Kent, England 1917; Died Sydney 1985		Modernist	
Emil Sodersten: Architecture, Sydney Technical College; Architecture Lectures, University of Sydney; Articled to Ross & Rowe	Born Balmain 30 August 1899; Died Manly 14 December 1961	Hall & Prentice; John P. Tate & Young; Emil Sodersteen/Emil Sodersten; Sodersten & Sodersten; Queensland and New South Wales	Inter-War Art Deco; Inter-War Functionalism & Moderne	Design Team, Brisbane City Hall (1921); Australian War Memorial, Canberra (1925); Birtley Towers, Elizabeth Bay (1935); CML Building, Sydney (1936); Nesca House, Newcastle (1939)
Colin Still	Born Sydney 13 March 1943; Died Sydney 7 August 2017	NSW Government Architects Office; Philip Cox Partners; New South Wales	Late 20th century Late Modern	City Council Library & Regional Gallery, Orange (1986) RAIA Sir John Sulman Medal; State Sports Centre, Olympic Park
Peter Stutchbury	Born 1954 Sydney	Stutchbury + Pape; New South Wales		Bay House, Sydney (2003) Robin Boyd Award
Sir John Sulman	Born Greenwich 29 August 1849; Arrived Australia 1885; Died North Sydney 18 August 1934	Blackmann & Sulman; Sulman & Power; New South Wales	Federation Free Classical	The Armidale School (1889); The Women's College, University of Sydney (1890–94); Presbyterian churches Woollahra (1889), Manly (1889–92) and Randwick (1890); Thomas Walker Convalescent Hospital, Concord

Return to top of page

== T ==
Architect and education	Birth, immigration and death	Firms, institutions and geographical locations	Architectural style	Notable buildings and awards
Enrico Taglietti	Born Italy 1926; Arrived Australia early 1960s; Died 2019	Australian Capital Territory	Late 20th century Organic	Dickson Library, Antill Street, Dickson (1964); Associated Chamber of Manufacturers, Brisbane Avenue, Barton (1967); Apostolic Nunciature, Vancouver Street, Red Hill (1977); St Anthony's Catholic Church, Agincourt Rd, Marsfield, NSW (1968)
Lloyd Tayler: Sorbonne	Born London 26 October 1830; Arrived Australia 1851; Died Brighton 17 August 1900	Partners; Lewis Vieusseux; E. W. Wright; Frederick Fitts; Alfred Dunn; Victoria	Victorian Academic Classical; Victorian Italianate; Federation Anglo-Dutch	Kamesburgh, Brighton (1872); Thyra, Brighton (1883); Leighswood, Toorak; Rosecraddock, Caulfield; Chevy Chase, Were Street, Brighton; Blair Athol, Brighton; Kilwinning, East St Kilda; St Mary's Church of England, Hotham (1860); St Philip's, Collingwood (1865); Presbyterian Church, Punt Road, South Yarra (1865); Trinity Church, Bacchus Marsh (1869); Eastern Hill Fire Station, Melbourne (1892)
Florence Mary Taylor CBE: Articled to Edmund Skelton Garton; Architecture, Sydney Technical College; Architecture Lectures, Sydney University	Born Bedminster, England 29 December 1879; Arrived Australia 1884; Died Potts Point 13 February 1969	J. Burcham Clamp		
George Temple-Poole: Inaugural president of the West Australia Institute of Architects (1896)	Born 29 May 1856 Rome, Italy; Arrived Australia 1885; Died Darlington, Western Australia 13 February 1969	Principal Architect (Western Australia) 1891–97	Free Style Arts and crafts	Perth Observatory; Perth railway station; Jubilee Building, Perth; Perth Mint
Ian Thomson		NSW Government Architect (1978–88); New South Wales		
Alexander Tzannes	Born 1950 Sydney	Tzannes Associates: New South Wales	Late 20th century Post-Modern	Federation Pavilion, Centennial Park (1987); Henwood House, Paddington (1988) Robin Boyd Award; House, Northbridge (1997) Robin Boyd Award

Return to top of page

== U ==
Architect and education	Birth, immigration and death	Firms, institutions and geographical locations	Architectural style	Notable buildings and awards
Jørn Utzon AC (honorary): Royal Danish Academy of Fine Arts	Born Denmark 1918; Lived Australia 1959–1966; Died Denmark 2008	International	Modernism	Sydney Opera House; RAIA Gold Medal (1973); Pritzker Prize (2003)

Return to top of page

== V ==
Architect and education	Birth, immigration and death	Firms, institutions and geographical locations	Architectural style	Notable buildings and awards
John Verge	Born Hampshire, England 1782; Arrived Australia 27 December 1828; Died Macleay River 9 July 1861	Worked with: John Bibb; New South Wales	Old Colonial Regency; Old Colonial Grecian	St James Anglican Church, vestries, King Street, Sydney (1833); Denham Court, Denham Court (1834); Camden Park, Elizabeth Macarthur Drive, Camden (1835); Lyndhurst, Glebe (1835); Engehurst, Ormond Street, Paddington (1835, partial remains); Rockwall, Rockwall Crescent, Potts Point (1835); Tusculum, Manning Street, Potts Point (1836); Tempe House, Princes Highway, Tempe (1836); The Vineyard (later named Subiaco), Rydalmere (1836, demolished 1961); Terrace house, 39 and 41 Lower Fort Street, The Rocks (1936); Elizabeth Bay House, Onslow Avenue, Elizabeth Bay (1837); Chapel of St Mary the Virgin, Denham Court (1838)
Lieutenant-Colonel Venables Vernon DSO: Articled to Howard Joseland	Born Hastings 20 February 1877; Arrived Australia 3 November 1883; Died Warrawee 3 July 1935	Joseland & Vernon (1903–14); New South Wales and Australian Capital Territory		
Colonel Walter Liberty Vernon VD: Royal Academy of Arts; South Kensington School of Art	Born High Wycombe, England 11 August 1846; Arrived Australia 3 November 1883; Died at Darlinghurst on 17 January 1914	Habershon & Pite London; Charles Moreing Hastings; Vernon & Wardell (1884–89); NSW Government Architect (1890–1911); New South Wales	Federation Academic Classical; Federation Anglo Dutch; Federation Gothic; Federation Free Style; Federation Arts and Crafts	Art Gallery of New South Wales, main facade (1906); Darlinghurst Fire Station (1910); Bourke Court House (1900); Pyrmont Fire Station; State Library of New South Wales, Mitchell wing; Fisher Library at the University of Sydney; Central railway station, Sydney
Major-General James Victor: Royal Military College, Duntroon	Born London 17 March 1792; Arrived Australia November 1842 and left December 1848; Died Edinburgh on 4 February 1864	Royal Engineers; Tasmanian Board of Public Works; Tasmania		Barracks Gaol, Hobart; Convict Hospital, Campbell Street, Hobart; Tasmanian Government House, out-buildings and cottages, Hobart

Return to top of page

== W ==
Architect and education	Birth, immigration and death	Firms, institutions and geographical locations	Architectural style	Notable buildings and awards
Alan Walker	Born 1864; Died 1931			
William Wardell	Born 1823; Died 1899			
B. J. Waterhouse OBE: Articled to John Spencer; Architecture, Sydney Technical College	Born Leeds, England 8 February 1876; Arrived Australia March 1885; Died Neutral Bay 21 December 1965	NSW Government Architect's Office (1900–08); Waterhouse and Lake (1908–1924); Worked in association with Leslie Wilkinson; Director, and later chairman, National Capital Planning and Development Committee (1938–58); New South Wales	Federation Arts and Crafts; Inter-War Mediterranean; Inter-War Georgian Revival	Ailsa, 33 Shellcove Road, Neutral Bay (1908); Tulkiyan, 707 Pacific Highway, Gordon (1913); Brent Knowle, 31 Shellcove Road, Neutral Bay (1914); Refectory Building, Science Road, University of Sydney (1924); Nutcote, May Gibbs's House, Neutral Bay (1925)
Charles Weatherburn		NSW Government Architect (1974–78); New South Wales		
William Weaver		NSW Colonial Architect (1854–56); New South Wales		
Charles Webb	Born 1821; Died 1898			
Peter Webber		NSW Government Architect (1973–74); New South Wales		
Seymour Wells	Born Australia 1865	Architect, NSW Department of Public Instruction; NSW Government Architect (1927–29); New South Wales		Conversion Covernment House Stables to Sydney Conservatorium of Music (1913); Dixson Wing, State Library of New South Wales; Nurses' Home, Maitland Hospital
Francis White	Born 1819; Died 1888			
Henry White	Born 1876; Died 1952			
Cuthbert Whitley	Born 1886; Died 1942			
Prof Leslie Wilkinson OBE: Royal Academy	Born New Southgate 12 October 1882; Arrived Australia 1918; Died Vaucluse 20 September 1973	Architect, University of Sydney; Dean of Architecture, University of Sydney; Diocesan Architect Anglican Church Diocese of Sydney; New South Wales	Inter-War Mediterranean; Inter-War Georgian Revival; Inter-War Gothic	Greenway, Vaucluse (1923); Chemistry Building, University of Sydney (1923); Physics Building, University of Sydney (1926); House, 6 Wiston Gardens, Double Bay (1934) Sir John Sulman Medal; Samuel Hordern House, Bellevue Hill, NSW (1936); Maiala, Warrawee (1937); Greyleaves, Burradoo (1934); Hazeldean, Cooma (1937); Silchester, Bellevue Hill (1930); St Michael's Church Complex Additions, Vaucluse (1942) Sir John Sulman Medal; RAIA Gold Medal (1960)
Henry Austin Wilshire	Born Potts Point, Sydney, 1860; Died Neutral Bay, Sydney, 1923	H.A. Wilshire and Day (1913–1923)		Grafton Gaol (Grafton Correctional Centre) (1893); Ingleneuk, Neutral Bay (1903); Dalkeith, Cremorne (1908); Bennett and Wood (Speedwell bicycles) building (1908); Warringah Hall, Neutral Bay (1910); Furlough House, Narrabeen (1918)
Ernest Willis	Born 1867; Died 1947			
Andrew Wilson	Born 1866; Died 1950	Murdock McKay Hopkins; Western Australian goldfields and Perth		
Ron Wilson	Born 1886; Died 1967			
William Hardy Wilson	Born Campbelltown 14 February 1881; Died Richmond 1955	Kent & Budden; Wilson, Neave & Berry; NSW, Tasmania & Victoria	Inter-War Georgian Revival	Eryldene Gordon; Purulia Wahroonga; Newington College War Memorial Stanmore; Ku-Ring-Gai Council Chambers Gordon; Domestic Architecture in Australia (published 1919); Old Colonial Architecture of New South Wales and Tasmania (published 1924)
Arthur Winston	Born 1908; Died 1980			
Edward John Woods	Born 1839; Died 1916	Woods Bagot		
Frank Woolacott	Born 1903; Died 1968			
Ken Woolley	Born 1933; Died 2015	Ancher Mortlock Murray & Woolley; Ancher Mortlock & Woolley		Woolley House, Paddington (1987) Robin Boyd Award; RAIA Gold Medal (1993)
Edmund Wright	Born 1824; Died 1888			
James Wright	Born London 1854; Died Perth 1917	J. W. Wright & Co.		Woodbridge House; Union Bank; York Town Hall

Return to top of page

== See also ==
- Australian architectural styles
- New South Wales Government Architect
- Principal Architect (Western Australia)
