= Robert Cochrane Kindergarten =

Heritage-listed school in Melbourne, Victoria, Australia

Location
- 2A Minima Street, Hawthorn, City of Boroondara, Melbourne, Victoria; Australia; 37°49′26″S 145°02′29″E

Information
- Type: Preschool
- Established: 22 April 1950; 76 years ago
- Website: robertcochranekindergarten.com.au

History
- Built: 1948–1950

Site notes
- Material: Timber; ship-lap timber; cement sheeting; caneite; masonite; glass
- Architect: Horace Tribe (attrib.)

Victorian Heritage Register
- Official name: Robert Cochrane Kindergarten
- Type: Registered place
- Criteria: a., b., d., h.
- Designated: 14 February 2013
- Reference no.: VHR H2309
- Heritage overlay no.: HO580
- Category: Education

The Robert Cochrane Kindergarten is a preschool located at 2A Minima Street in Hawthorn, in the City of Boroondara, in the inner eastern suburbs of Melbourne, in Victoria, Australia. Historically significant, the Robert Cochrane Kindergarten is a single-storey timber building that was constructed between 1948 and 1950 as part of the Free Kindergarten movement in Victoria.

Built on the traditional lands of the Wurundjeri people, the preschool was added to the Victorian Heritage Register on 14 February 2013 in recognition of its historical, social, and architectural significance.

== History ==
A free kindergarten was first established in Auburn in 1911, only a few years after the first kindergartens were established in inner-city Melbourne suburbs. The establishment of the Free Kindergarten Union (FKU) in 1909 resulted in an increase in pre-school facilities throughout the Melbourne metropolitan region, particularly in poor areas. Robert Cochrane, chairman of directors of Brooks Robinson Pty Ltd – a Colonial supplier of building materials – a philanthropist with a particular interest in child welfare, and prominent figure in the establishment of Congregationalism in Victoria, organised the establishment of the Auburn Free Kindergarten in the denominational school hall at the rear of the Augustine Congregational Church.

In 1934 Cochrane donated land at the rear of the church to enable construction of a purpose-built kindergarten, and after his death the following year it was decided to name the new building in his honour. Financial difficulties and World War II delayed progress, however in 1946 the architectural firm Martin and Tribe were commissioned to design the kindergarten. Marcus Martin was involved in kindergarten design, most significantly in the design of the Lady Gowrie Child Centre, in Carlton in 1938, which became a prototype for kindergarten planning at a time when new pre-school educational theories were developing. A partnership established with the younger Horace Tribe that year continued until 1949 when Tribe left to open his own office. Substantial contributions to the design of kindergartens in Victoria were made by the partnership and by Tribe in sole practice.

== Description ==
Due to financial constraints, the Robert Cochrane Kindergarten was built to a modified design attributed to Horace Tribe. It is a single storey building containing two main rectangular playrooms which are parallel and offset to allow the principal frontage of both rooms to receive favourable north-east light. These rooms flank a central circulatory spine, with amenity and administration areas located at either ends of the main playrooms. Separate steep skillion roofs over each playroom are supported on roof trusses, the top chords of which project to form unlined eaves.

External walls are clad with vertical ship-lap timber boarding and the original corrugated cement sheet roof has been replaced with metal tray decking. The north-east frontages incorporate vast areas of glazing: full height bays of multi-paned timber framed windows and rows of tripartite clerestorey windows above. Both playrooms have a pair of large glazed sliding doors to the playground. Internally, walls are lined with caneite with masonite dadoes, and the walls of the central corridor have glazed windows and sliding doors. Cathedral ceilings have exposed timber trusses with later panelled lining. Original features include a brick fireplace and row of asymmetrically placed shelves above, enamel steel troughs, low height toilet partitions, built-in cupboards with push button latches, door and window furniture, simple timber architraves and skirtings, and early external signage.

At the time of construction, this building was a progressive example of kindergarten design and early example of modern architectural thinking. It incorporated planning ideals already used in earlier designs by Martin and Tribe and the economical use of materials in a highly modern design. At the time of completion the kindergarten was acknowledged in local, interstate and international newspapers and journals as an innovative, modernist building, including comment and extensive illustrations in Architectural Record (USA) in 1952. The building became a prototype for a large number of kindergartens constructed in the 1950s and 1960s throughout Victoria, many of which were designed by Horace Tribe.

The Robert Cochrane Kindergarten continues to operate as a local kindergarten and both the exterior and interior remain substantially intact. A small addition was added to the rear of the building in 1982 and the playground was altered.

== See also ==
- Architecture of Melbourne
- List of schools in Victoria
- List of places on the Victorian Heritage Register in the City of Boroondara
