= Woolacott =

Woolacott is a surname. Notable people with the surname include:

- Frank Woolacott (1903–1968), Australian architect and structural engineer
- J. E. Woolacott (1861–1936), British journalist

== See also ==
- Wollacott, surname
- Woollacott, surname
