= Conrad Sayce =

Australian architect and writer

Conrad Harvey Sayce (1888–1966) was a British born Australian architect and writer.

Conrad Sayce was born in Hereford and educated in England before migrating to Australia. He practised architecture in Melbourne with Rodney Alsop and the firm of Alsop & Sayce won the Hackett Competition for the design of Winthrop Hall at the University of Western Australia. The commission led to a legal dispute between the partners, from which Sayce withdrew. As an author his works include poems, short stories and adventure novels which reflect his experience of outback life and landscape. He also produced literary works under the name of Jim Bushman.

== Selected works ==
- The Valley of a Thousand Deaths (c. 1920)
- Golden Buckles (1920)
- In the Musgrave Ranges (1922)
- The Golden Valley (1924)
- The Splendid Savage: A Tale of the North Coast of Australia (c. 1925)
