= Australian architectural styles =

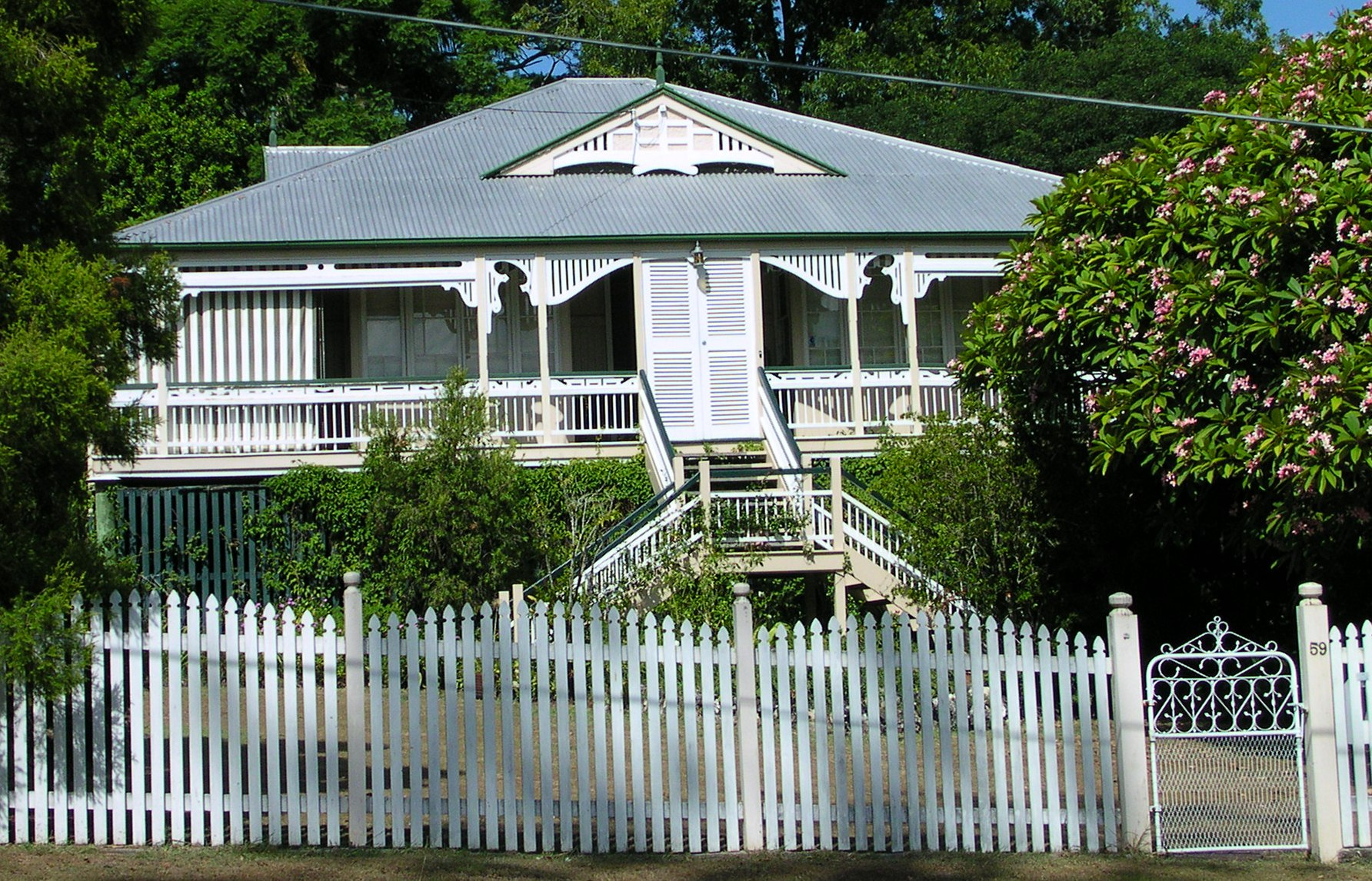
Home in the Queenslander style

Australian architectural styles, like the revivalist trends which dominated Europe for centuries, have been primarily derivative.

== Background ==
Aboriginal and Torres Strait Islander peoples lacked permanent formal architecture, constructing rudimentary temporary shelters at convenient locations.

During the nineteenth century, Australian architects were inspired by developments in England. This is in part due to a large number of architects coming from England to Australia to practice. In the twentieth century, American and International influences dominated. As Australia gradually became a multicultural nation in the late 20th century, the influences of immigrants also became evident. Imported exotic styles earlier than this can be found in a small number of historically significant Joss houses and synagogues. In more recent times, other global and South-East Asian influences have had a minor influence on Australian architectural styles.

Some architectural styles show the direct influence of local factors such as climate (directly resulting in the "Filigree", "Queenslander" and "Federation Home" styles) and local materials and skillsets. Some Australian architects were also seen at the forefront of various movements, particularly residential architects like Harry Norris, Roy Grounds, Robin Boyd, Frederick Romberg and Harry Seidler.

== Categories of styles ==
Australian Architectural Styles can be divided into two main categories: "Residential" and "Non-Residential". Residential styles are the most widespread and account for the majority of the buildings constructed in Australia, but non-residential buildings display the greater variety of styles.

Styles in detail:

- Australian residential architectural styles 30,000 BCE – present
- Australian non-residential architectural styles 1788–present

== See also ==
- Architecture of Australia
- List of architectural styles
