= Woollacott =

Woollacott is a surname. Notable people with the surname include:

- Angela Woollacott (born 1955), Australian historian
- Ernest Henry Woollacott (1888–1977), Australian Methodist minister
- Janet Woollacott (1939–2011), British-born French singer
- Marjorie Woollacott, American neuroscientist
- Martin Woollacott (1939–2021), British journalist
- Richard Woollacott (1977–2018), British horse trainer

== See also ==
- Ben Woollacott (ship)
- Wollacott, surname
- Woolacott, surname
