= Burt Memorial Hall =

Building in Perth, Western Australia

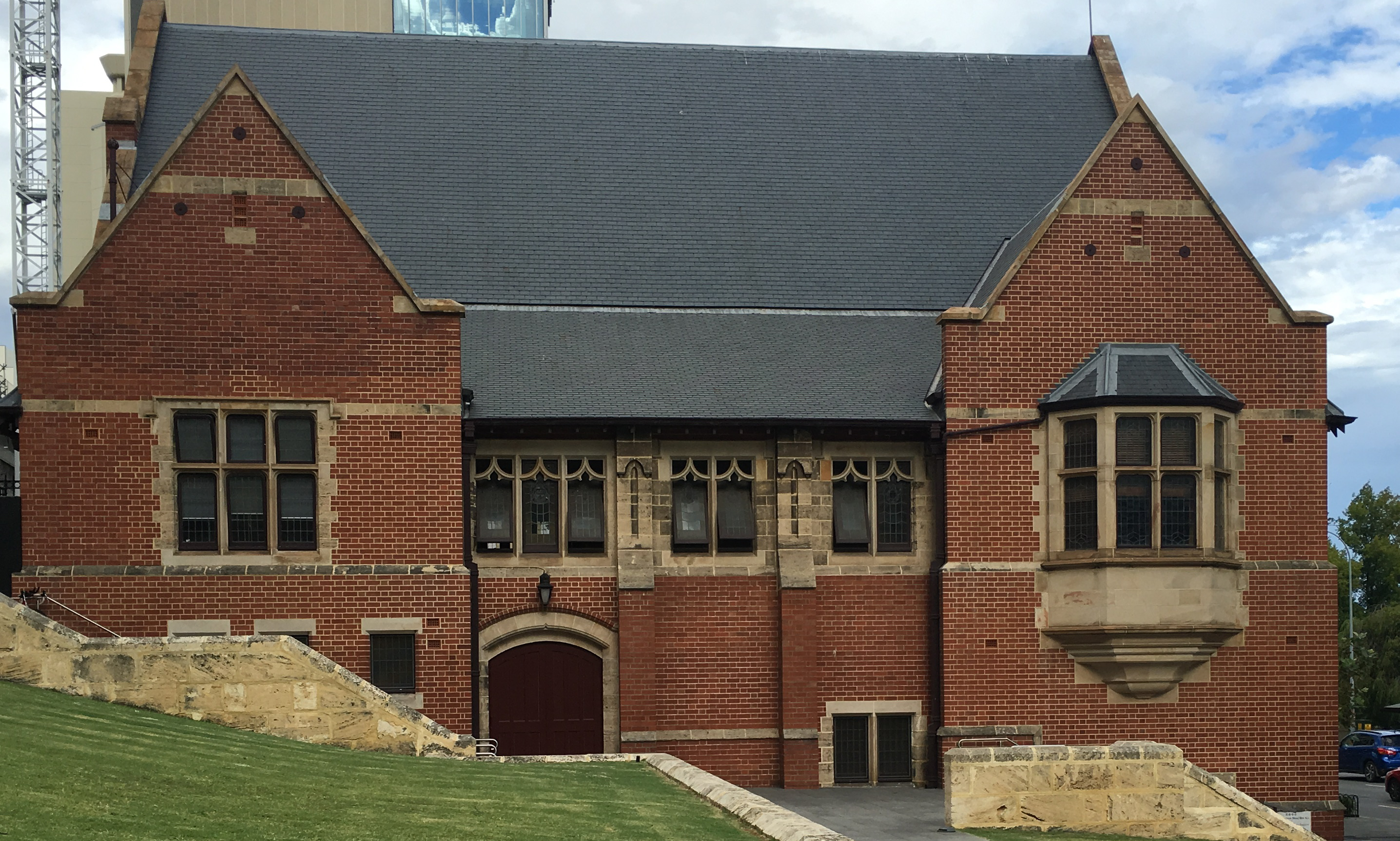
- Burt Hall from the west
- Interactive map of the Burt Memorial Hall area

General information
- Architectural style: Gothic Revival, Inter-War Period (c. 1915-1940)
- Location: 38 St Georges Terrace, Perth, W.A., Australia
- Coordinates: 31.9560°S 115.8613°E
- Construction started: 26 October 1917
- Completed: 1918
- Opened: 12 June 1918

Design and construction
- Architects: Parry, George Herbert
- Developer: Arnott, C. W.

Website
- St George’s Cathedral Chapter

Western Australia Heritage Register
- Type: State Registered Place
- Designated: 13 August 2004
- Reference no.: 2101

Burt Memorial Hall is a hall located on the southern side of Cathedral Square on St Georges Terrace, in Perth, Western Australia.

Septimus and Louisa Burt gifted it to the Anglican Church in Perth, in memory of their sons who had lost their lives in World War I, Theodore in 1917, and Francis in 1918.

The site was formerly the location of an old bungalow building used as a military officers quarters before becoming a church office.

The foundation stone was laid on 26 October 1917 by Sir John Forrest, and the hall was opened on 12 June 1918 by Lieutenant Governor Sir Edward Albert Stone. The hall was designed by George Herbert Parry and built by C. W. Arnott.

In 1922, in memory of Septimus Burt, a stained glass window was placed in the hall.

The hall was utilised for a number of activities, including proselytising for secession in the 1930s. It was also used as a venue for exhibitions and events in the 1930s, and during the Second World War.

The hall was renovated in the late 1930s, with reopening celebrated in 1939. Further renovations occurred in 2010, with a 2014 completion, including a re-roofing. The hall was reopened and rededicated at Evensong on 20 July 2014.

In 2017 two statues of soldiers and two plaques were set into the southern wall to commemorate the centenary of the building.
