= Russell Ellis =

Australian architect

Portrait of Russell Stuart Ellis, courtesy of The University of South Australia

Russell Stuart Ellis (20 August 1912 – 2 February 1988) was one of the most prominent South Australian Modernist architects.

His philosophy required that all aspects of the design be considered at the outset: functionality, roof line, siting, orientation, natural ventilation, solar control, the landscape setting and garden, selection of construction materials and techniques, furnishings and interior decoration, and colour schemes.

== Life ==
Born on 20 August 1912, Ellis completed his Architectural Draftsman's Certificate in 1934 at the South Australian School of Mines and Industries. He then went on to complete an "Associate-ship Diploma, which entitled him to become an Associate of the SAIA in 1935

As a young architect Ellis assisted Philip Claridge with the design for the Port Lincoln Town Hall (1935), designing the Art Deco style moulded plaster frieze Ellis went on from schooling to work for Claridge in his practice He stayed in Adelaide until June 1943 when he moved to Darwin, returning in April 1944 In 1945 Ellis took a job working with the Allied Works Council, Department of Public Works, Adelaide where he worked on the re-planning of Darwin

In the period following the war, from 1945 to 1946, Ellis wrote a series of articles for South Australian Homes and Gardens titled 'Thoughts on Planning the Immediate Post War House'. In these he dealt with the design of homes, discussed the philosophy behind his designs and advocated open plan layouts and large windows. 'By then his outlook was decidedly modern' Following the war, Ellis joined F.K. Milne, Dakins and Boehm, leaving in 1957 after Milne's retirement to work on his own in 1958

Following this move into sole practice in 1958 Ellis completed many religious buildings including alterations to the convent for the Daughters of Charity, Hutt Street, Adelaide (1960–1962), Seacliff Presbyterian Church (1962–1963) and St Christopher's Anglican Church, Kilburn (1962). Ellis also designed a series of project homes for the Modern Homes Planning Service in the 1960s. These could be best termed 'conventional', with solid brick, pitched roofs and functional planning. Flats designed by Ellis included those for Hugh Pozza (1959) at Glenelg North and Mecham constructions (1965) at Seacombe Gardens. These later designs featured the use of materials such as brick, fieldstone and sandstone, as well as concrete panels and cantilevered concrete projections. While he was working in Whyalla on contract to BHP between 1966 and 1970 he designed a YMCA hostel, football clubhouse and oval and an electrical substation. He moved to Whyalla on a contract with Broken Hill Proprietary and worked there between 1966 and 1970. He retired in 1971 and died on 2 February 1988.

== Notable Projects ==
During the early year of his practice, Ellis designed houses for his relatives and family friends and one of the most renowned works was the Wright House (built 1947–1953) which he designed for his friend, Charles Wright, in Springfield. Wright House was well known for its functional planning with the living areas to the north of the building and the sleeping areas to the south separated by a large hall which is also the main entry to the house. The architect-client relationship also influenced the planning and the design of the house.

Wright House, which was a composition of intersecting planes and cubic forms, all painted in white, is also known as one of the first few residential in Adelaide that was built in the Modernist Style along with Ellis House, a house he designed for himself in Springfield. Beside residential projects, Ellis also completed a number of religious buildings including the alterations to the convent for the Daughters of Charity, Hutt Street, Adelaide (1960–1962), Seacliff Presbyterian Church (1962–1963) and St Christopher's Anglican Church, Kilburn (1962).

== Awards ==
Ellis was one of the inaugural members of the Architects' Club in 1938, the goals of which were to stimulate and educate architects and the public's interest in architecture

== Firms and Partners ==
Firms and Partners	Years
Lionel G. Bruer	1928-
Norman Fisher	1928-
Philip Claridge	1928-
P.R. Claridge and Associates	1934-
Department of the Interior	1941-1944
Allied Works Council, Department of Public Works	1945-1947
F.K. Milne, Dawkins and Boehm	1947-1957
Russell S. Ellis	1958-1971

== See also ==
- List of Australian architects
