= Captain Stirling Hotel =

Hotel in Nedlands, Western Australia

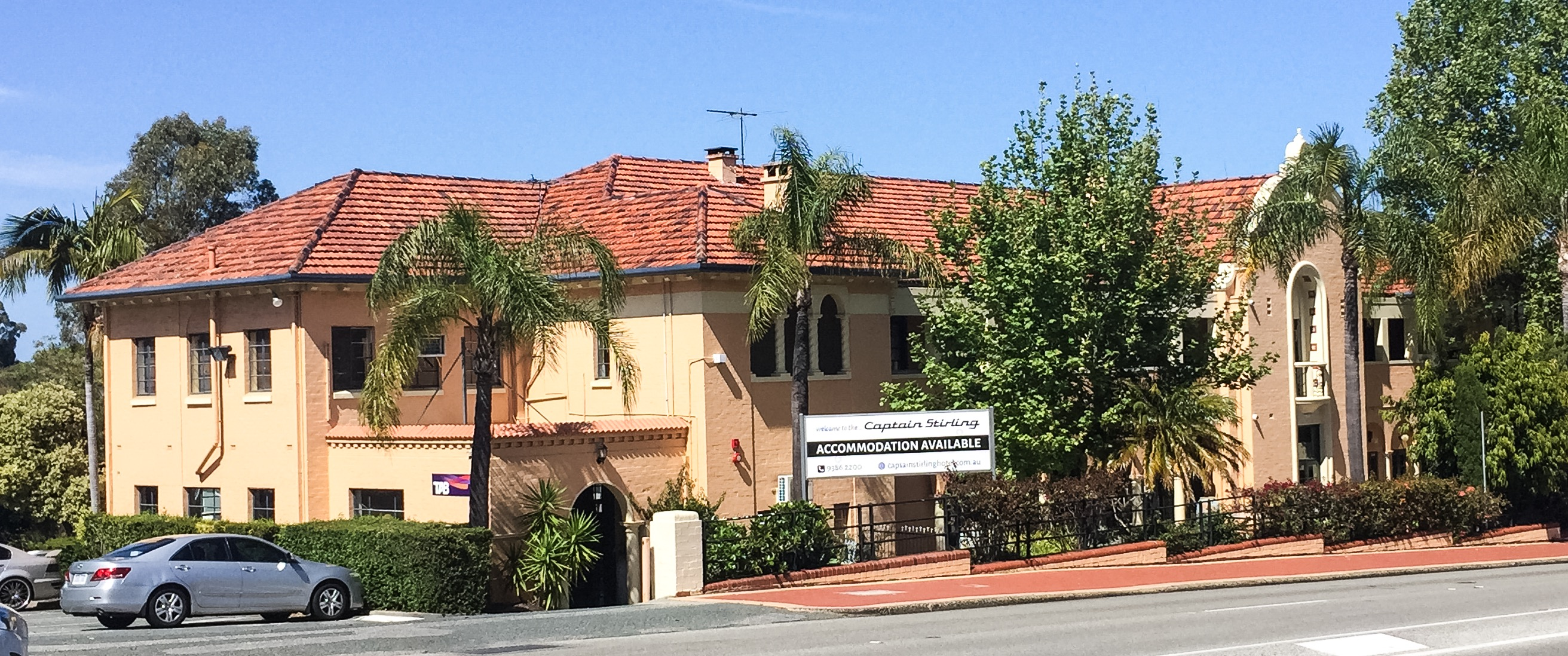
- Stirling Highway frontage of the Captain Stirling Hotel
- Interactive map of the Captain Stirling Hotel area

General information
- Type: Hotel
- Architectural style: Inter-War Mediterranean/Spanish Mission
- Location: 80 Stirling Highway Nedlands, Western Australia
- Coordinates: 31°58′45″S 115°48′15″E
- Completed: 1935
- Owner: Edward Bertram Johnston (until 1942)

Height
- Height: Two storey

Design and construction
- Architects: Marshall Clifton, George Parry
- Architecture firm: Clifton Parry
- Main contractor: H. E. Allwod

Renovating team
- Architects: Overman & Zuideveld

Website
- www.captainstirlinghotel.com.au

Western Australia Heritage Register
- Type: State Registered Place
- Designated: 30 August 2016
- Reference no.: 1832

Register of the National Estate
- Official name: Captain Stirling Hotel
- Type: Historic
- Criteria: A.4, H.1, G.1, D.2
- Designated: 26 October 1999
- Reference no.: 16692
- Place File Number: 5/11/018/0018

The Captain Stirling Hotel is a heritage-listed building located at 80 Stirling Highway, Nedlands, Western Australia. The building was designed by Marshall Clifton in 1935, and is an Inter-War Mediterranean/Spanish Mission style two-storey hotel.

== History ==
The Captain Stirling Hotel is situated on Stirling Highway between Stanley Street and Florence Road. It was constructed between April and December 1935 for Edward Bartram "Bertie" Johnston. The newspapers at the time reported that the hotel was constructed for N. B. Robinson, however Robinson was actually Johnston's solicitor (from the legal firm Abbott, Abbott, Andrews & Robinson) who made the license application on Johnston's behalf, whilst he was out of the state. It was designed by the architectural partnership of George Herbert Parry and Marshall Clifton. The Captain Stirling Hotel was the first of three Inter-War Spanish Mission style hotels designed by Parry & Clifton, the second being the Inglewood Hotel (1935) and the third was the Big Bell Hotel near Cue (1936). The hotel was constructed by E. A. Allwood for a cost of £10,000. Allwood was also responsible for constructing the Inglewood Hotel, the Capitol Theatre, New Oxford Theatre and the Plaza Theatre.

During the 1950s, the eastern end of the building was extended with an office, associated entrance area, manager's quarters and a staircase. In 1958 the owners opened the state's first drive-through bottle shop with vehicular access from Stirling Highway. It was designed with a modern butterfly roof by Bill Evans, from Marshall Clifton's architectural practice.

In 1986 Marie Wordsworth, the daughter of Bertie Johnston, commissioned architects, Overman & Ziudeveld, to undertake extensive remodelling of the building, which included landscaping works and the expansion of the ground floor space to make it larger and more viable for functions.

== Architectural character ==
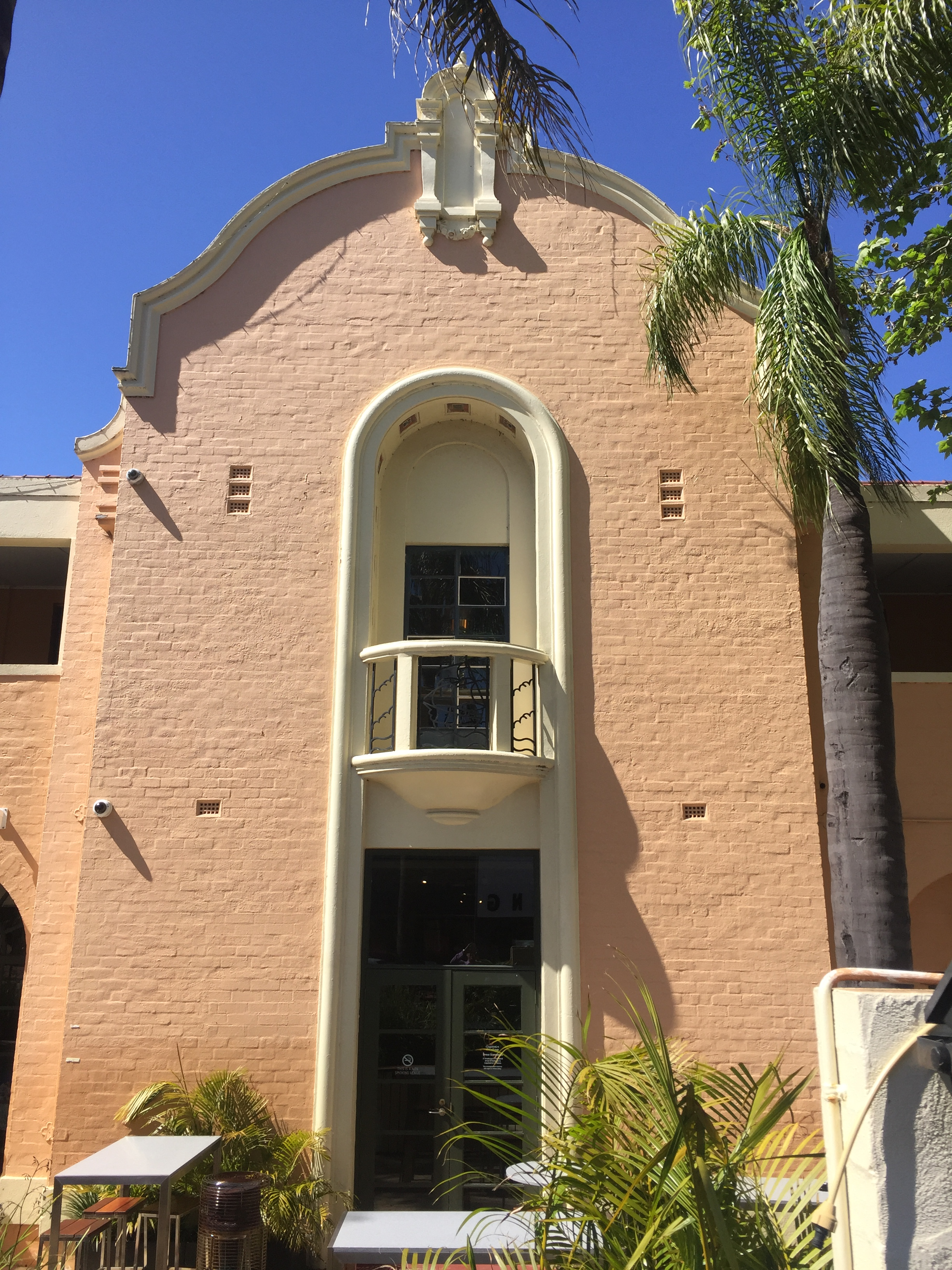
Cape Dutch influenced gable, with small juliet balcony

The Captain Stirling Hotel and drive-through bottle shop comprises a two-storey rendered masonry and tile hotel and a single-storey rendered masonry and asbestos bottle shop, adjacent to the hotel. The hotel is located close to Stirling Highway, with a courtyard below footpath level at the front of the building. The bottle shop is located in the car park, and accessed from Stirling Highway and Stanley Street. A carpark behind both buildings is accessed via Florence Road and Stanley Street.

The hotel displays characteristics of Inter-War Mediterranean/Spanish Mission style of architecture, with arched openings, supported on pre-cast concrete twisted columns, first floor balconies, a central Dutch influenced gable, steel framed windows and arched entry supported on masonry columns. A balcony in the gable has a round arched opening with concrete moulding, and a juliet balcony with wrought iron tracery between the concrete balustrades. The bottle shop has rendered and painted masonry walls, with a distinctive asbestos clad butterfly roof and steel framed windows.

== Heritage value ==
The hotel was nominated for the Register of the National Estate by the Australian Heritage Commission in November 1997 and was permanently registered on 26 October 1999. On 22 April 1998 it was classified by the National Trust of Australia (WA), with the City of Nedlands including it on their Municipal Heritage Inventory (adopted 27 April 1999). The hotel and bottle shop received interim listing on the State Register by the Heritage Council of Western Australia on 9 February 2016 and was permanently registered on 30 August 2016.
