= Wollacott =

Wollacott is a surname. Notable people with the surname include:

- Bertie Wollacott (1890–1945), Australian rules footballer
- Joe Wollacott (born 1996), English footballer

== See also ==
- Woolacott, surname
- Woollacott, surname
