= John Hipwell (architect) =

Australian architect

John Hipwell (30 November 1920 – 16 June 2007) was an Australian architect who practised and designed mainly in Warrandyte, Victoria, Australia. He worked with Fritz Janeba (former Bauhaus student and notable architect) and was the longest surviving member of Hipwell, Weight and Mason Architects. He also served in Papua New Guinea as commanding officer of radar unit 334 with the R.A.A.F. during the Second World War.

== Early life ==
John Buckland Hipwell was born in Korumburra, Victoria on 30 November 1920. He is the only child and son to Conrad Edmund Hipwell, a Presbyterian clergyman and Bessy Emily May Hipwell. His family lived in Maffra, Victoria through much of his childhood and spent most of his primary school years at Maffra primary. Hipwell attended Scotch College, Hawthorn, to complete his secondary schooling. As a boy, he had an interest in art and he had considered studying art at university however his parents wanted him to pursue a career in engineering. Therefore, a compromise was made in studying architecture at Melbourne University whilst residing at Ormond College. Hipwell was able to study architecture for 3 years after which he enlisted himself into the Australian Air Force during World War II. He spent three years in the war where he served as commanding officer in Papua New Guinea of radar unit 334, which had 30 men. After Hipwell had been discharged, he returned to Australia and continued his architectural studies at Melbourne University, graduating in 1948.

== Personal life ==
Hipwell met his wife Elizabeth "Betty" McCallum before the war in Sydney and became engaged whilst Hipwell was enlisted. The pair married in Sydney on 13 January 1945. Elizabeth had been very attracted to the Warrandyte area and suggested to John that they live there. He and Elizabeth moved to Warrandyte, Victoria soon after. Elizabeth introduced him to Fritz Janeaba starting a great friendship between Fritz and John. They had three children Alexandra Elizabeth Rosalie Hipwell (18 December 1947–), Pamela Margaret Edith Hipwell (1 July 1949–) and John Robert Crispian Hipwell (13 January 1953–).

== Career ==
As a graduate architect, Hipwell began working immediately for Martin and Tribe who specialised in high-class residencies in Toorak and South Yarra. When Horace J. Tribe resigned to open his own office, Hipwell worked with Tribe during 1949 to 195- during which time, Tribe went on to become the state's leading specialist in the design of modern pre-school centres, with examples as far afield as Swan Hill and Korumburra.

During the mid-1950s, Hipwell opened his own private practice in Russell Street, Melbourne. During this time he was working on residential projects and a number of churches.

== WWII service career ==
- Training course-O19 G (O-Officer's course and G-ground radar). This was under the Control of Professor Bailey of Sydney University, hence the graduates were known as "Bailey Boys".
- John Buckland Hipwell

RAAF Service No. 68939
Bailey Boy

- Commands: 3

1943-08-18 334RS PltOff
1944-1 2- 01 304RS FlgOff
1945-08-30 40RS FlgOff

- Rank Changes:

1943-05-22 PltOff
1943-11-22 FlgOff

334RS was formed in Canberra on 18 August 1943 and moved to Mascot on 10 September 1943, to Port Moresby on 5 October and Gusap ( on Ramu River) PNG on 5 November. P/O Hipwell was appointed as its CO from 11 August 1943 until relieved by F/O Siegle in January 1944.

304RS was formed on 20 October 1942 at Townsville and operated from 12 December 1942 at Port Moresby and from 10 January 1943 at Cape Pierson, Normanby Island, PNG; and from 12 January 1945 at Gurney Strip, Milne Baay PNG. P/O Hipwell is not listed as CO but F/O C B D Blumenthal is shown as being in command from 13 November 1943 until 4 January 1945, an unusually long sojourn in one location.

40RS was formed 6 July 1942 and from November 1942 was located and remained at Merauke, Dutch New Guinea, CO P/O F A Hull. Four other COs were listed there prior to F/O Hipwell who was posted to it on 25 August 1645.

See also WW2 Nominal Roll

This shows that J B Hipwell enlisted at Carlton in the Army as V158637 on 12 November 1940 and was discharged as a lance corporal from the 3rd Australian Survey Corps on 5 July 1942. Subsequently, he enlisted in the RAAF in Sydney on 17 August 1942 as 68939 and was discharged as a flying officer on 1 April 1946 from 2 Radio Installation and Maintenance Unit ( 2RIMU).

More information on units and personnel of the RAAF Radar units is available in the 'Pete Smith' collection at the RAAF Museum at Point Cook.

=== Residential ===
- The Nicholas residence, Koornong North Warrandyte
- The Knottenbelt residence, Warrandyte
- Mrs Ewan's residence, Koornong, Warrandyte North
- Brian & Mary Hanrahan, Kangaroo Ground Round, Warrandyte North
- The Hipwell Residence (his family home) Research Rd, Warrandyte.

=== Churches ===
- Warrandyte uniting church, working on the spire and numerous internal details. Hipwell was very displeased with a new addition made in a large mural.
- Loch uniting church, this remains very much as Hipwell had designed it.
- The Foyer of Boxhill Uniting Church.
- He had regularly hired the Master Potter Reg Preston to create ceramic tiles and plaques with religious themes

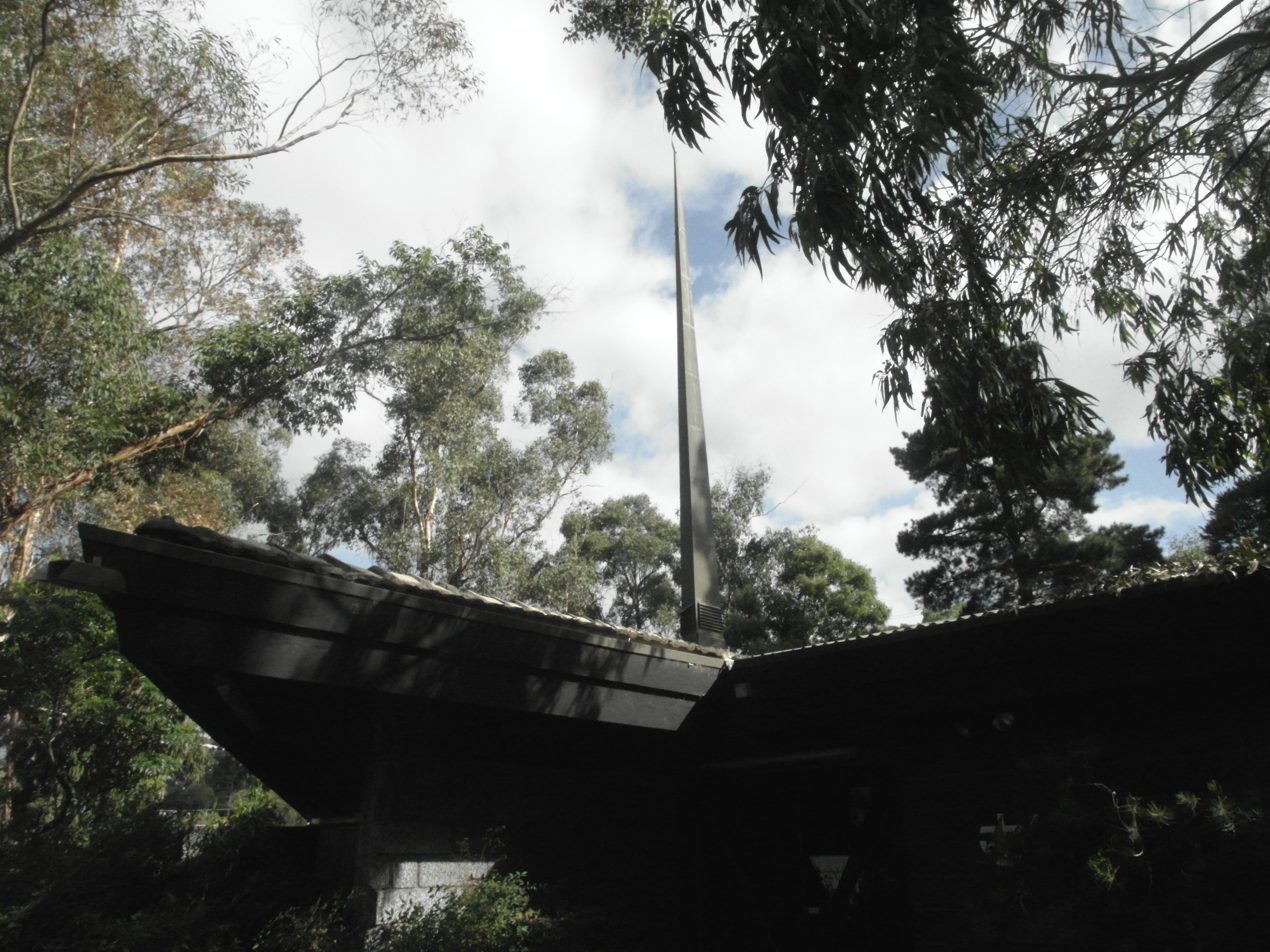
Hipwells Uniting Church Warrandyte.

Hipwell later formed a partnership with Charles Weight and Peter Mason named Hipwell, Weight & Mason in 1960. In 1963 Peter Mason was killed in a car accident ending the partnership. Hipwell and Weight began a new partnership with Albert Ross becoming Hipwell, Weight and Ross until Charles Weight died in 19- from Hodgkin's disease. From there Hipwell and Ross disbanded and Hipwell went on to work for the Department of works for the Victorian Federal Government. In this position, Hipwell worked on the Papua New Guinea Army Expansion Program, and the Bouganville Hospital; as well as the Darwin Gaol with prestigious architect Alfred Dalton. In the Late 1960s, Hipwell resigned from his position with the Department of Works.

=== Later career ===
Hipwell was the only non-potter founding member of Potters Cottage a noteworthy organisation based in Warrandyte. This experience, travel & idealism helped to lead to a new career path. They built up 'Betty Hipwell Cottage Industries' importing & wholesaling handmade goods from Developing countries. This spanned 1968–1989.

=== Hipwell Residence ===
John Hipwell designed and made his family residence off Research Road in Warrandyte. Unfortunately, the original house, which was published as the cover story in Home Beautiful (October issue 1954) burnt down in a bushfire which ran through Warrandyte and surrounding areas in 1962. The original house burnt down due largely to the entire northern façade being completely glazed and the building's structure being timber. This led Hipwell to design his new house, built in 1963, with bushfires in mind. He used non-combustible materials and an alignment which encouraged the fires to pass over the structure rather than attack and destroy the new house.

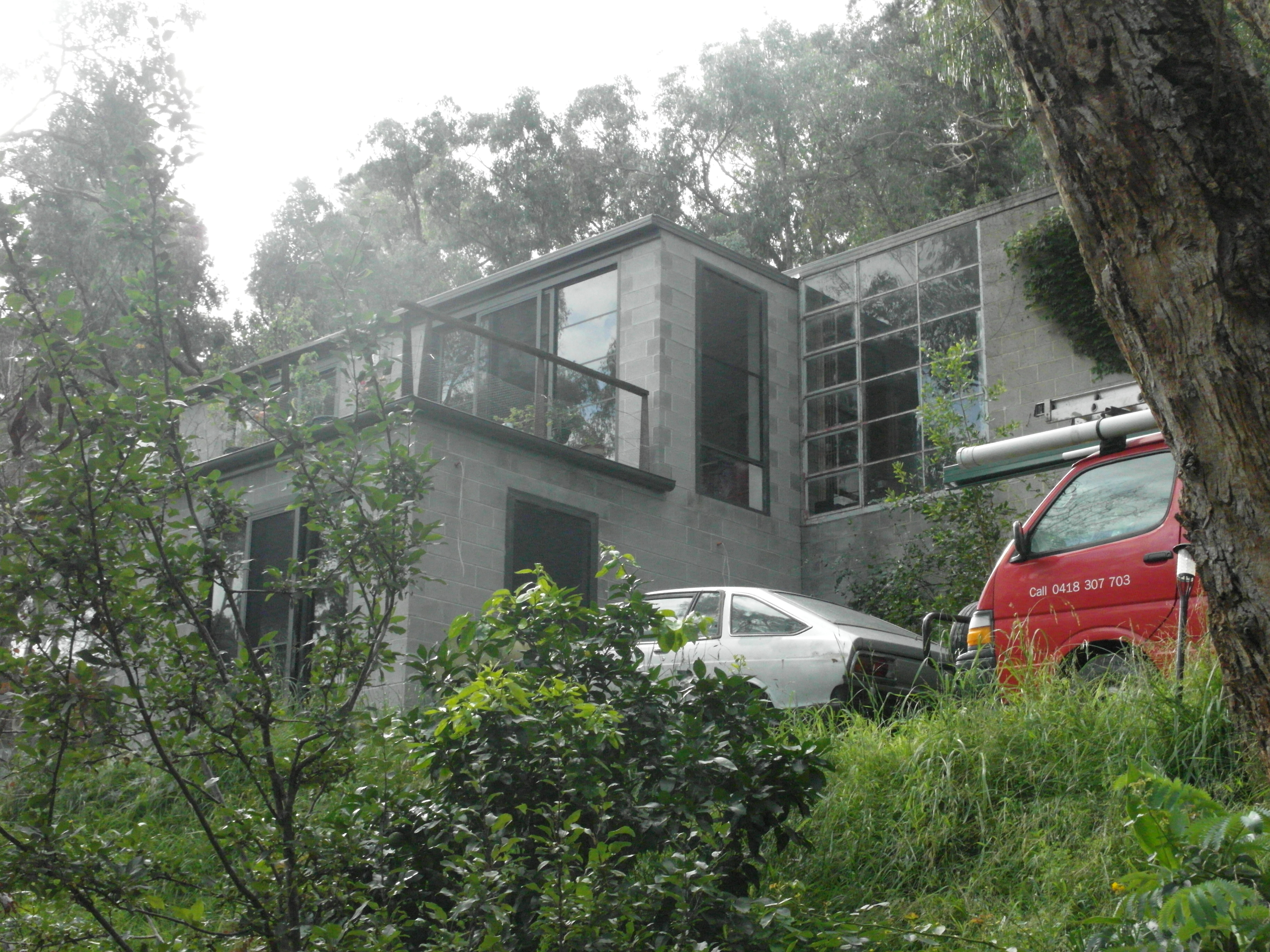
New Hipwell residence Research Rd Warrandyte.

== Later life ==
In December 1995 John and Elizabeth Hipwell moved to an apartment in Southbank, Victoria and remained there until John's death. Hipwell became very committed to helping architectural students often allowing interviews and photos. He also maintained an extensive collection of puppets which he had been interested in since childhood. Hipwell also had an interest in Electronic music, developing a number of scores and operas.

== See also ==
- List of Australian architects

== Sources ==
Biographical cuttings on John Hipwell, containing one or more cuttings from newspapers or journals
Stafford, Brian, Richard, Preston. City of Doncaster and Templestowe heritage study context publishing
