= John Oldham (architect) =

Australian landscape architect

John Bramston Russell Oldham
- Born: 19 December 1907
- Died: 1999 (aged 91–92)
- Occupation: Architect
- Spouse: Ray Oldham (nee McClintock)
- Children: Patricia; Jan

John Bramston Russell Oldham AM (1907–1999) was a landscape architect in Western Australia. Oldham, a pioneer of landscape architecture in Australia, and his journalist wife Ray were founding members of the National Trust (WA) and were prominent in the fight to save some of WA’s heritage buildings during the 1960s and 1970s.

== Biography ==
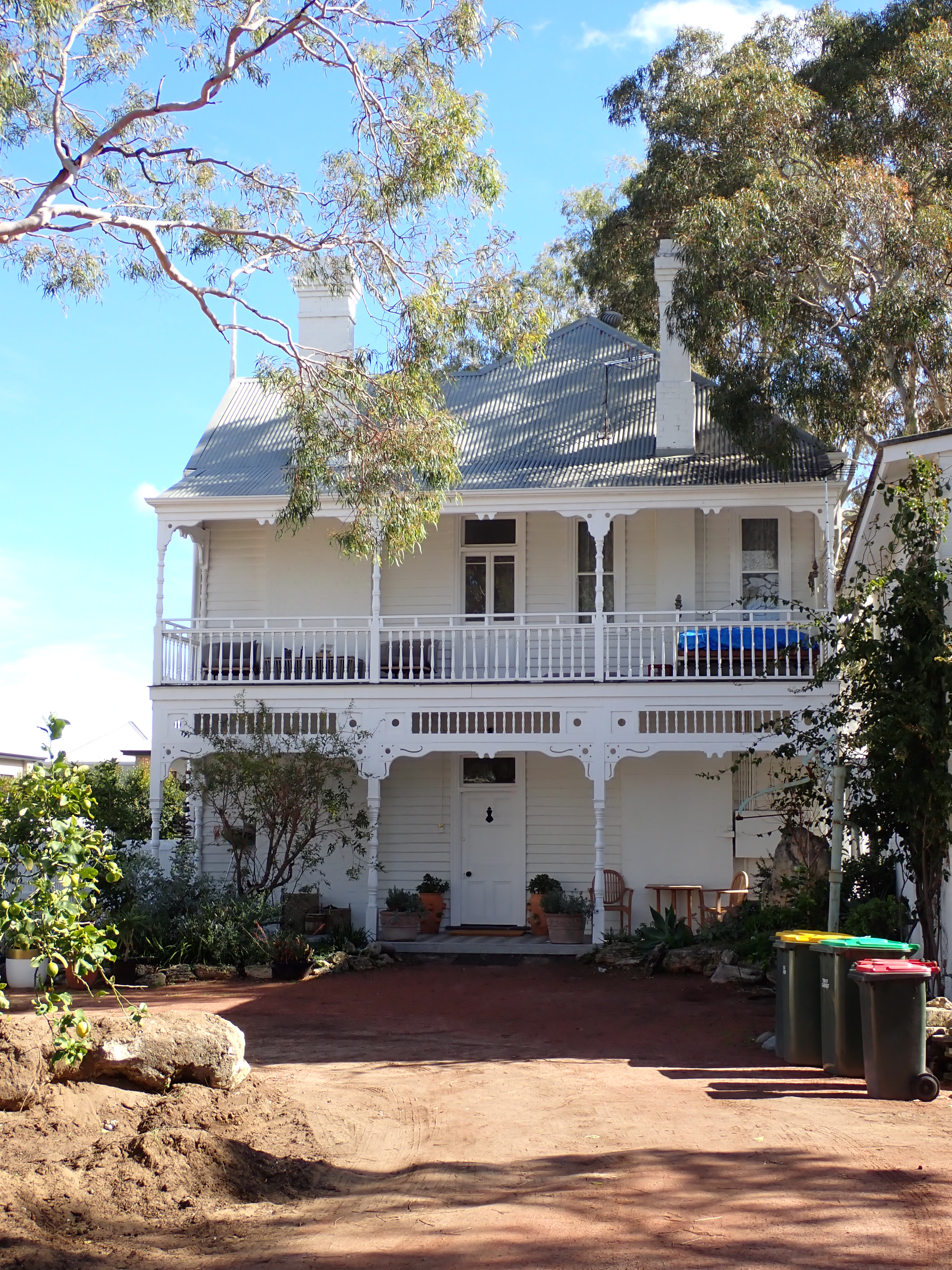
Oldham's long-term residence in Swanbourne, now state heritage listed

John Oldham was born in Perth on 19 December 1907. His father, Charles Lancelot Oldham, was a well known local architect who had designed a number of buildings in Fremantle during the 1890s, including the Fremantle Markets. His mother, Susan, was a painter. Both of Oldham's maternal grandparents were also painters, and his paternal grandfather, James Oldham, the headmaster of the Central Training School in Ballarat, established the Ballarat Art Gallery.

Oldham was educated at Christ Church Grammar School and as a boarder at Guildford Grammar School. In 1924 he served an architectural apprenticeship to the firm Oldham, Boas and Ednie-Brown, which had bought his father’s business after the death of Oldham Senior in 1919. In 1928 he joined the staff of Rodney Allsop Oldham, where he worked on designs for the University of Western Australia, he then went for a year of study at the Architecture Atelier at the University of Melbourne. Oldham returned to Perth in late 1930, and capitalised on his graphic skills to set up the ‘Poster Studio’ with Harold Krantz, where, even during the Great Depression, he was able to make a living out of producing lino-cut poster prints. In 1932, as a result of a family legacy, he moved to Sydney, where he established the Oldham Publishing Company which produced lino-cut posters and calendars. In 1934 he returned to Perth joining an architectural firm established by Krantz, as a junior partner. During 1934–37, Oldham established himself as an architectural designer, specialising in the rendering and presentation of architectural drawings. He drew heavily on his knowledge of the ideas of the Bauhaus and the International School.

In 1936 he met Ruby "Ray" McClintock, a journalist with The West Australian, who he married the following year. In the late 1930s the couple joined the Communist Party and embraced its programmes – especially the Workers’ Art Guild. Oldham contributed substantially to the design and production of posters and programmes. They moved to Sydney, where he joined the architectural firm of Stephenson and Turner and, in 1939, was given the task of designing the Australian Pavilion for the 1939 New York World's Fair.

Oldham was appointed WA’s first Government landscape architect in the 1950s. Among his many achievements were the landscaping of the Narrows Interchange, Parliament House, Sir Charles Gairdner Hospital, Serpentine and Wellington Dams, Western Australian Institute of Technology, Crestwood estate and developing a master plan for Kings Park and the Swan River foreshores.

Internationally renowned as a landscape architect, Oldham was admitted as a Member of the Order of Australia (AM) in 1990. He died in 1999.

The long-term residence of Oldham and his wife at 11 Saladin Street in Swanbourne was added to the Western Australian State Register of Heritage Places in 2010.

=== Honours ===
In 2000, John Oldham Park at the Narrows Interchange was named in his honour.
