= Eva Buhrich =

German architect and writer

- Born: Eva Bernard; 1915; Nuremberg, Bavaria, Germany
- Died: March 1976 (aged 60–61); Australia
- Occupation: Architect
- Spouse: Hugh Buhrich
- Buildings: Buhrich House II (with Hugh Buhrich)

Eva Buhrich (1915–1976) was a German architect and writer who fled Nazi Germany in the 1930s, emigrated to Australia and became a prominent architectural commentator.

== Biography ==
Born in 1915 in Nuremberg to Jewish parents, Buhrich began her architecture studies in 1933 at a university in Munich. Difficulties with the Nazi regime forced her relocation to Berlin, where she continued to study under modernist expressionist architect Hans Poelzig, and then to Zurich, where she completed her diploma in 1937 at the technical university, under Otto Salvisberg. Although she had been awarded a postgraduate scholarship to carry out research into schools, the impending threat of World War II resulted in Buhrich emigrating to Australia in 1939 with her husband, Hugh Buhrich, whom she had met in Munich while they were both architecture students and married in 1938.

Despite having studied at esteemed European universities, Buhrich's qualifications were not recognised in Australia. Professor Alfred Hook of the University of Sydney helped both Buhrich and her husband to secure work at an architecture practice run by Heather Sutherland and Malcom Moir in Canberra. In 1940, not long before the family moved to Sydney, Eva Buhrich gave birth to twins Neil and Clive. This was a period when many women encountered both subtle and direct forms of discrimination in the workforce, such as lower wages.

After periods working as an architect for the Commonwealth Experimental Building Station and in partnership with her husband, Eva Buhrich had established herself as a writer and editor by the 1950s. Between the 1940s and 1950s, her writing appeared in The Australian Women's Weekly, Woman, Walkabout and House and Garden, among other publications, at times under assumed (male) names. Notably, Buhrich penned a column in the Sydney Morning Herald from 1957 through to the late 1960s and published the book Patios and Outdoor Living Areas in 1973. With her husband, Buhrich played a key role in advocating for preventing the demolition of the Walter Burley Griffin-designed Willoughby Incinerator in 1975. Meetings to establish the Walter Burley Griffin Trust (NSW) took place at their home. Buhrich was the face of the campaign, which succeeded in mobilising support and ultimately saved the incinerator.

Eva Buhrich died in March 1976 after suffering from cancer.

== See also ==
- Buhrich House II

== Published works ==
- Patios and Outdoor Living Areas Sydney : Ure Smith, 1976
