= Canite =

Low-density fiberboard panel made from sugarcane fibers

Canite, also known as caneite, caneboard, pinboard or softboard, is a low-density fibreboard panel made from sugar cane fibres. It is easy to handle, lightweight and relatively durable in indoor use. Because of its low environmental footprint it is considered a sustainable building product.

It can be used without finish, painted, or rendered with natural lime-based products, and is commonly used for:

- interior wall and ceiling lining
- pin boards and bulletin boards
- office partitions
- protective covering boards
- sound insulation and reflected sound reduction
- hollow core door filling
- stucco base
- soundproofing under floorboards
- fire lighter (when saturated with kerosene)

In Australia, canite is commonly sold in 2400 x 1200 mm panels. They are typically 10–13 mm thick, with a density of 350 kg/m^{3}.
