= Hugh Buhrich =

German architect

- Born: Hugh August Buhrich; 25 April 1911; Germany
- Died: 18 June 2004 (aged 93); Australia
- Occupation: Architect
- Spouse: Eva Buhrich
- Buildings: Buhrich House II (with Eva Buhrich); Point Piper House in Point Piper

Hugh Buhrich (25 April 1911 – 18 June 2004) was a German architect who arrived in Australia as a refugee from Nazi Germany before World War II. Buhrich's practice, of 40 years, covered commercial and domestic projects. His projects were generally designed in a modernist style and often contained specific interior designs along with the buildings. His most notable and recognized project was the construction of his personal home, which is described by Peter Myers as "the finest modern house in Australia".

== Personal life ==
In his earlier years, Buhrich would have pursued medicine instead of architecture, however, it required Latin. Heavily influence by the Bauhaus style, Hugh wanted to enrol in a university located close to home, however his scholarship would have been rendered invalid as he was required to leave. As a result, he attended an architecture school in Munich, until he was ejected by the Nazis in retaliation for student political activity. Shortly afterward Buhrich decided to move to Berlin where he practiced under Hans Poelzig, an architect, painter and set designer. During this time he met his future wife, Eva Buhrich, who was a fellow student. Buhrich eventually moved to Zurich where he finally finished his degree in the German Free state of Danzig, which is now Gdańsk.

Hugh's wife Eva fled Germany to the Netherlands, however, he could not practice architecture there and was forced to go to London by himself. Hugh and Eva ultimately decided to settle in Australia after debating between emigrating to America, which was too competitive, or to South Africa which required a landing fee and was too expensive.

== Work life ==
After arriving in Australia, Professor A.S. Hook from the University of Sydney helped Hugh and Eva secure a (shared) architectural job in Canberra. When war broke out, the Buhrichs were dismissed from the job following the return of the original employees. During this time, Hugh joined the army and only resumed his practice upon return. Remaining unregistered in New South Wales until 16 November 1971, Hugh restricted himself mainly to furniture and interiors. However, from the 1960s to 1970s, roughly twenty buildings were designed and constructed by Hugh. Unfortunately the vast majority of his work has been demolished but his own house, largely self-built between 1968 and 1972, still stands today and is perhaps the most accomplished of his works.

== Notable projects ==
Buhrich House II was designed and built between 1968 and 1972. It is located at 375 Edinburgh Road, Castlecrag, and is a reinterpretation of a European modernist aesthetic. The structure stands atop a sandstone ledge overlooking middle harbour and was inhabited by Buhrich for over thirty years. The house was designed and built to accommodate the surrounding landscape and is therefore built at one level. It is meant to give a sense of "going downhill" towards the waterfront. This was accomplished by sloping the ceiling to the legal minimum height facing the water's edge. Almost every part of this highly inventive building was made for a specific purpose with repetitive simple parts and off-the-shelf materials. The house stands out from many other styles during the time period due to the angularity of the plan and the casual regular and irregular geometries. Described by French critic Françoise Fromonot as "a truly radical building" and by Peter Myers as "the finest modern house in Australia", the Buhrich house provides extraordinary beauty into Hugh's most intensely personal project. The house is listed on the New South Wales State Heritage Register as of State significance for its historic and aesthetic values, as well as of particular cultural/social importance amongst the architectural community.

The Point Piper House at 15 Wunulla Road, Point Piper, New South Wales, was designed by Buhrich and completed in 1961. It was extensively renovated in 2005 by Louise Nettleton Architects with the object of keeping Buhrich's original design elements intact. The renovation was given a Commendation Award by the NSW Chapter of the Australian Institute of Architects in 2005.
