= Buhrich House II =

- Location within Sydney Location within Australia
- 33°47′44″S 151°13′49″E
- Location: 375 Edinburgh Road, Castlecrag, City of Willoughby, New South Wales, Australia

History
- Built: 1972
- Built for: Hugh Buhrich; Eva Buhrich

Site notes
- Architects: Hugh Buhrich (original house); Clive Buhrich (1982 additions)
- Owner: Members of the Buhrich family

New South Wales Heritage Register
- Official name: Buhrich House II
- Type: State heritage (built)
- Designated: 25 May 2001
- Reference no.: 1513
- Type: House
- Category: Residential buildings (private)

Buhrich House II is a heritage-listed residence located at 375 Edinburgh Road, Castlecrag, New South Wales, a suburb of Sydney, Australia. It was designed by Hugh Buhrich and built during 1972. The property is privately owned by members of the Buhrich family. It was added to the New South Wales State Heritage Register on 25 May 2001.

== History ==
The Buhrich house at 375 Edinburgh Road, Castlecrag was designed and built (1968–72) by Hugh August Buhrich for himself and his wife, Eva Buhrich.

The Buhrich's first bought land at 315 Edinburgh Road, Castlecrag from Marion Mahony Griffin, and designed their first house in Castlecrag some years later, in 1939–49.

The Buhrich's bought the block of land at 375 Edinburgh Road in the 1950s. The site is part of the original Castlecrag Griffin subdivision. For many years Buhrich's assistant, Bill Chambers lived on the site in the remnants of a dwelling designed by Walter Burley Griffin in the 1920s. In 1961, Buhrich constructed a boatshed by the water at No. 375, where he subsequently built a 35-foot sloop.

In 1968–72, the Buhrich's designed and built their house. They retained the two-storey Griffin knitlock structure, demolished an adjacent lean-to, and built a new house which is attached to the Griffin building. In 1982, Buhrich's son, Clive Buhrich, also an architect, made some alterations under the house — originally intended to be a garage, terrace and tool store. The house has otherwise not been altered.

Born in Hamburg in 1911, Hugh Buhrich studied architecture in Munich, Zurich, Danzig and Berlin. One of his most influential teachers was Hans Poelzig. Fleeing the Nazis by way of London, where he worked briefly, Buhrich migrated to Australia in 1938 with his wife Eva Bernhard. The Buhrich's came to Australia on a Quaker sponsored relocation to Canberra. The Quakers provided early work contacts. Buhrich practiced architecture in Sydney from 1945 to 1991, mainly in residential design. In 1945 Hugh and Eva Buhrich established an office in Pitt Street, Sydney but were not recognized as qualified architects until the 1960s. He worked with assistant, Bill Chambers. Eva Buhrich, his wife, is also an architect however worked mostly as a journalist in Australia.

Major influences of Buhrich were Hans Poelzig and Alfred Roth. Buhrich also visited Le Corbusier's chapel at Ronchamp (1950–1954) in the 1960s.

== Description ==
The Buhrich House is set on the waterfront at Castlecrag and incorporates the remnant of a Walter Burley Griffin "Knitlock" structure (an interlocking concrete block designed by Griffin). In contrast to the so-called Sydney School houses with their predictable embrace of "natural materials", this building is deliberately counterbalanced against its locality, both to reduce the actual site "imprint" and accentuate by contrast the precarious topography.

Myers describes the difficulty perceiving the building as a whole from the outside. The house is almost invisible unless you know it's there. It is set high above the waters edge on a steep rocky escarpment amongst overgrown gardens and organically inspired landscaped stone steps and retaining walls, an integral part of the Griffin's organic philosophy.

The exterior of the building reads as a series of reinforced concrete blade walls and sandstone walls (quarried from the site) set on a concrete platform with a combination of catalogue metal framed glazed walls and sliding doors, and sculptural feature elements. On the south elevation adjacent to the entry there is a "floating" rectangular wall - a feature of perforated timber louvres which appears to float in glazed surrounds. The wall, in fact, is supported on small diameter pipe columns. The north wall is completely glazed and provides water views though the curtain of native trees. The heavy sinusoidal roof mass passes over as a visually uninterrupted form from the interior to the exterior, and appears to float above the windows on this elevation. The roof is clad in sheet copper. The deck, with no handrail, is reached by an external spiral concrete stair which cantilevers precariously above a sheer drop to the water's edge. The house is "consciously not very carefully crafted but like a Yangtse junk is intentionally slightly rough and with a mixture of off-the-shelf components and materials".

The interior of the building has a strong connection with the outside. The main living space contains an elevated kitchen and dining area, which look over the living space through the trees to the water. The kitchen is a well-crafted piece of timber "furniture" carefully designed as an insertion in the living space. Stone masonry forms a sculptural fireplace and an end wall, and a sinusoidal motif tapestry (also by Buhrich) located on the "floating" wall is the back drop to the cantilevered dining table. The fixed and free furniture has been designed and chosen to complement the space as sculptures within a sculpture. The bent-wood chairs covered with cowhide were designed by Buhrich and the dining room chairs are by Eames.

In plan, the living areas are separated from the bedrooms/study and bathroom by a glazed corridor adjacent to a garden area to the south. The 2 bedrooms (plus study) are simple spaces, painted white with modern built-in furniture. Between these rooms is the bathroom, which is a continuous and organic form whereby the bath and basin are moulded as one with the wall. The form/finish is a luminous red moulded fibreglass. There is a stunning contrast between the bathroom and the openable glazed wall to the north, the water and the canopy of trees.

The existing small two storey Griffin building adjoins the carport at the driveway (upper) level. Its construction is "knitlock" concrete blocks with a sandstone base in part. There is an external entrance to this building from inside at the junction of the modern Buhrich House.

The lower level of the Buhrich House has been recently enclosed in part to create additional living areas. It is not connected internally to the main house.

A timber walkway, similar to the upper level balcony/deck, provides access from the lower level of the house via a diagonal concrete stair to the boatshed at the foreshore.

=== Condition ===
As at 3 January 2001, the building appears to be in excellent condition. There may be some archaeological potential (Aboriginal, Griffin).

The house has a high degree of integrity, however, the addition infilling the lower level compromises the sculptural effect to some degree.

=== Modifications and dates ===
- 1920s: Griffin building
- 1961: Buhrich built boatshed
- 1972: Buhrich built main house
- 1982: Alterations to main house (underneath)

=== Further information ===
Contemporaries of Buhrich are Sydney Anchor, Harry Seidler, and Arthur Baldwinson, all of whom worked in the Modern Movement Internationist style.

It is worth noting that Walter Burley Griffin and Hugh Buhrich both studied architecture overseas, migrated to Australia, settled in Castlecrag and lived and worked in a similar environment. It is likely that of all the buildings built since the 1950s in Castlecrag that, Griffin would have seen this building as a most appropriate modern addition to his subdivision.

== Heritage listing ==
As at 22 March 2001, the Buhrich House is of State significance for its historic and aesthetic values. In addition, it is also of particular cultural/social importance amongst the architectural community. It is significant because:

Buhrich House, is considered to be one of the finest modern houses in Australia. Since its "discovery" in the 1990s, it has been published in a number of the major Architectural journals in Australia, and in the Harvard Design Magazine (1997). It is recognized for its contribution to modern architecture because of its unique combination of off-the-shelf items and materials, hand crafted features, modelling of architectural space and forms, and relationship to the site. It demonstrates a timeless merging of craft, art, architecture and relationship to site.

The house was the home of European-trained migrant architects, Hugh and Eva Buhrich. Hugh was a little recognised, but highly regarded architect who worked mainly in residential design in Australia from 1945 to 1991. Eva was well-known and highly regarded for her architectural column in The Sydney Morning Herald from the mid-1950s to late 1960s. Designed for the Buhrichs' own family, this building is an uncompromising and representative example of Buhrich's architectural work in the later phase of his active professional career.

The Buhrich house is of State aesthetic significance as a unique building which retains its original integrity as an architecturally sculptural element on the water front escarpment. The interior, including furniture, and the exterior have a strong sculptural relationship. The choice of materials, structural elements and furniture (both fixed and freestanding) create an architectural organic form of high integrity.

The house demonstrates a particular evolution of the international influences of Modernism in Australia, which Buhrich brought to Australia as a migrant in 1938. Such influences were also brought to Australia by other more recognized contemporary emigres such as Harry Seidler. The work of Buhrich is possibly as important as the residential work of Seidler, although their interpretation of Modernism varied.

The house is of historical significance at a State level for demonstrating a powerful demonstration of modernist design in the Australian / Sydney context. This style of modernism contrasts with the "Sydney School" houses being constructed contemporarily, whose architects followed a different aesthetic approach — less geometric, and more attuned to the use of natural materials (sometimes referred to as 'nuts and berries').

The Buhrich House is also of historical significance as it represents a modernist contribution by a migrant architectural couple to the harbourside suburb of Castlecrag, first subdivided by the American architectural couple Walter Burley Griffin and Marion Mahony Griffin.

Buhrich House II was listed on the New South Wales State Heritage Register on 25 May 2001 having satisfied the following criteria.

The place is important in demonstrating the course, or pattern, of cultural or natural history in New South Wales.

The building is of historic significance as it contains a number of historic layers in the context of Griffin's subdivision of Castlecrag; a remnant of a Griffin Knitlock structure (1920s), integrated with a unique twentieth-century building (1972).

The place is important in demonstrating aesthetic characteristics and/or a high degree of creative or technical achievement in New South Wales.

The house itself is of historic and aesthetic significance for its bold and original sculptural qualities. It is modern without reference to typical stylistic architectural language. It demonstrates international education of the architect, combined with experimentation with construction and materials. The building represents a departure from the contemporary Sydney School architecture (rustic "nuts and berries" aesthetic).

The place has potential to yield information that will contribute to an understanding of the cultural or natural history of New South Wales.

The house was constructed using a combination of proprietary items (such as aluminium framed sliding doors) in combination handmade, unique elements (such as the fibreglass bathroom and the undulating ceiling in the living area.)

== Awards ==
In 2015 the Burich House II won the New South Wales Enduring Architecture Award 43 years after construction. The award recognises architectural innovation and buildings of outstanding merit, which remain important as high quality works of architecture when considered in the contemporary context.

== See also ==
- Australian residential architectural styles
