= Frank Woolacott =

Australian architect and structural engineer

Francis Prosser Woolacott (11 June 1903 – 30 March 1968) was an Australian architect and structural engineer. Woolacott was born in Annandale, Sydney and died in Mosman, Sydney.

== Early life ==
Woolacott was born on 11 June 1903 in Annandale, Sydney, Australia, the eldest of three children to general agent Henry Lovel Woolacott and his second wife Jane Kate (née Wilmott). He attended Drummoyne Public School but was dissatisfied with his education there. He then studied part-time at the Sydney Technical College while working as a draughtsman at several architectural firms.

== Career ==
Woolacott formally became an associate of the Royal Australian Institute of Architects in 1932. On 15 January 1935, at St Peter's Church in Neutral Bay, Woolacott married nurse Beatrice Joan Holland. During World War II, Woolacott joined the United States Army as an engineer. Terence Hale joined Woolacott's architectural firm in 1937, which undertook numerous contracts after the war, ranging from aircraft hangars to churches.

Woolacott became a member of the Association of Consulting Structural Engineers of New South Wales in 1936. He was the vice-president of the association from 1938 to 1939 and president from 1941 to 1942. He also became a member of the Australian Institution of Engineers in 1961. Struggling with health problems in his final years, but also frequently misdiagnosed, Woolacott died of hypertensive heart disease on 30 March 1968 at his residence in Mosman.
