= Marcus Martin (architect) =

Australian architect (1893–1981)

Marcus William Martin
- Born: 1893; Launceston, Tasmania
- Died: 1981 (aged 87–88)
- Occupation: Architect
- Writing career
- Subject: Architecture
- Movements: Moderne architecture, Georgian architecture, Spanish Colonial Revival architecture

Marcus Martin (1893–1981) was an Australian architect. He was an associate of the Royal Institute of British Architects, fellow of Royal Institute of Architects, and honorary secretary to the Royal Victorian Institute of Architects.

Martin was probably the most popular architect amongst the wealthy Toorak establishment in Melbourne, Australia during the interwar period and produced many buildings that exhibited his hallmark of restrained modernism. Martin was a Lieutenant in World War I where he suffered a gun shot wound in France; Martin also enlisted in World War II.

== Early life and career ==
Martin was born in 1893 in Launceston, Tasmania. He and his family moved from Tasmania to Melbourne in 1908. Martin then attended Melbourne Grammar School before serving his articles with A & K Henderson architects. Martin completed an architectural diploma course at the University of Melbourne.

Martin was considered a 'society' architect, designing houses for people such as;

- Hollywood silent film star Claire Adams
- Oil magnate Sir Hamilton Sleigh
- Parents of Prime Minister of Australia, Malcolm Fraser
- Sir William Irvine, GCMG KC, former Lieutenant-Governor, Attorney-General, Premier of Victoria, and Chief Justice of the Supreme Court.
- Walter Murray Buntine, founder of Caulfield Grammar, see Buntine oration
- Sir Henry Gullet
- Captain Keppel Palmer, aides-de-camp to the Earl of Stradbroke and Governor of Victoria
- Major Edric Henty, from the pioneering Henty family
- Major General Harold Grimwade CMG CB
- Sir Thomas Nettlefold, businessman and Lord Mayor of Melbourne
- Lauchlan ("L.K.S.") MacKinnon, former Chairman of the Victoria Racing Club
- Colonel Sir George Stevenson CMG, ANZAC commander
- Sir Stanley Argyle, Premier of Victoria 1932–35, and Lady Argyle
- Sir Rupert Clarke, 2nd Baronet of Rupertswood
- Commodore Alvord Rosenthal OBE

Martin also completed works at Ormond College, University of Melbourne

== Studio ==
Martin had a number of business enterprises and partners, being;

- Alsop & Martin (1920-1921)
- A & K Henderson, Alsop & Martin (1921-1924)
- Marcus W Martin (1924-1926)
- W & R Butler & Martin (1926-1931)
- Marcus W Martin (1932-1938)
- Marcus Martin & Tribe (1938-1949)
- Marcus W Martin (1949-1958)

Martin was prolific as an architect, he designed no fewer than 17 houses in Domain Road, South Yarra.

=== Influences ===
While Martin had visited Egypt and France through his war service, he was introduced to Modern architecture during his 11 months in Europe in 1931, where he also represented the RVIA at the International Housing and Town Planning Congress in Berlin which was hosted by Mies van der Rohe. During this study tour, Martin was impressed by the work of Dutch modernist Willem Marinus Dudok, and the National Romantic style of Ragnar Östberg's Stockholm City Hall.

Melbourne's T-Square Club

Martin was concerned about architecture that groaned under the weight of irrelevant classic detail and was impressed by modern architecture that was free from artificiality. He believed that the welfare of mankind should be an architect's first consideration, as well as building and planning for the future.

Robin Boyd later reflected that "all the founders of modern architecture disparaged the terrible buildings that were done in the name of art and creativity throughout the nineteenth century. They had to fight the ornament, the contrived symmetry and fakery of popular buildings to clear the way for a true architecture."

Martin and his peers were also influenced by the economic privations of the time. The Great Depression in Australia lasted from 1928 to 1934, a period where building completions fell by 95%, with austerity measures prior to of WW2 further hampering economic recovery. It was not until the mid-1950s that civilian building returned to the levels seen in the 1920s.

Martin was president of the T-Square Club which included members such as Rodney Howard Alsop, Keith Cheetham, Lindsay Bernard Hall, Robert Bell Hamilton, James Stuart MacDonald, William Beckwith McInnes, and Percy Hayman Meldrum. The club met for lunch bi-monthly at the Melbourne Savage Club where most of them were Members; Martin was also a member of the Melbourne Club.

=== Style ===
Primarily a residential architect, Martin was well known for his Georgian Revival and Spanish Mission design prior to the Great Depression. However, by the early 1930s, Martin's oeuvre mostly comprised the use of a restrained Moderne approach over an essentially Georgian building form.

Martin specialised in a quietly historicist mode that achieved a compromise between the prevailing period revival styles, and a more modern architectural expression.

Martin was known for his attention to detail, external facades were white stucco with generous square windows, including wrought iron (internal & external) by the important firm Caslake, and gardens by Edna Walling, one of Australia's most influential landscape designers.

Notable examples of Martin's style include 5 Linlithgow Road, Toorak, and 2 Lascelles Avenue, Toorak, both of which are listed (with others) as being of State significance by the Victorian Heritage Register. Linlithgow Road, which included one of Melbourne's first private swimming pools, is described by Heritage Victoria as being "One of the most refined and elegant Art Deco influenced mansions in Melbourne, representing the high point of the work of Marcus Martin, and a building of obvious influence. There are few equivalent houses in Victoria that demonstrate the abundant attributes of this property."

In the late 1930s and post-war period he also became involved in institutional design, most importantly the design of some 20 kindergartens. Martin's designs ushered in a whole new range of features, such as low roofs, and materials previously unused in such buildings, such as hardwood walls and concrete floors almost level to outside areas.

=== Legacy ===
It was residential architecture in post-war Australia where international modern architecture was most eloquently and skilfully expressed, creating a central expression of Australian culture. These architects considered what Modernism might mean in an Australian setting; earlier examples in Australia of experimental and functional architecture that engaged regional concerns had a significant influence on Modernist post war houses designed for the new suburbs of Australian cities. According to Barry Humphries, Melbourne's inner suburbs are amongst the most congenial and attractive residential areas in the world and it may be that the real heroes of Australian architecture are the designers of these 'inter-war' houses.

Martin influenced the next generation of pioneer modernists such as Geoffrey Mewton and Sir Roy Grounds, leading to what Robin Boyd described as 'the Victorian type'.

By the 1950s Martin was training the next generation of Australian architects, such as Neil Clerehan, who trained under him at Martin & Tribe in 1946 and is considered one of Melbourne's great architectural figures. Clerehan and Martin worked together on the Gordon Homes project on the Nepean Highway. David Godsell also worked for Martin while still an architecture student, and later went on to design important houses such as The Godsell House, "a notable example of postwar Modern residential architecture." Godsell also worked for Guilford Bell who at one stage was in partnership with Neil Clerehan. Martin's legacy establishes a link in the Australian design vernacular from the early 20th Century through Mid-century modern to contemporary architects such as Sean Godsell, son of David Godsell.
