= George Herbert Parry =

Australian architect (1882–1951)

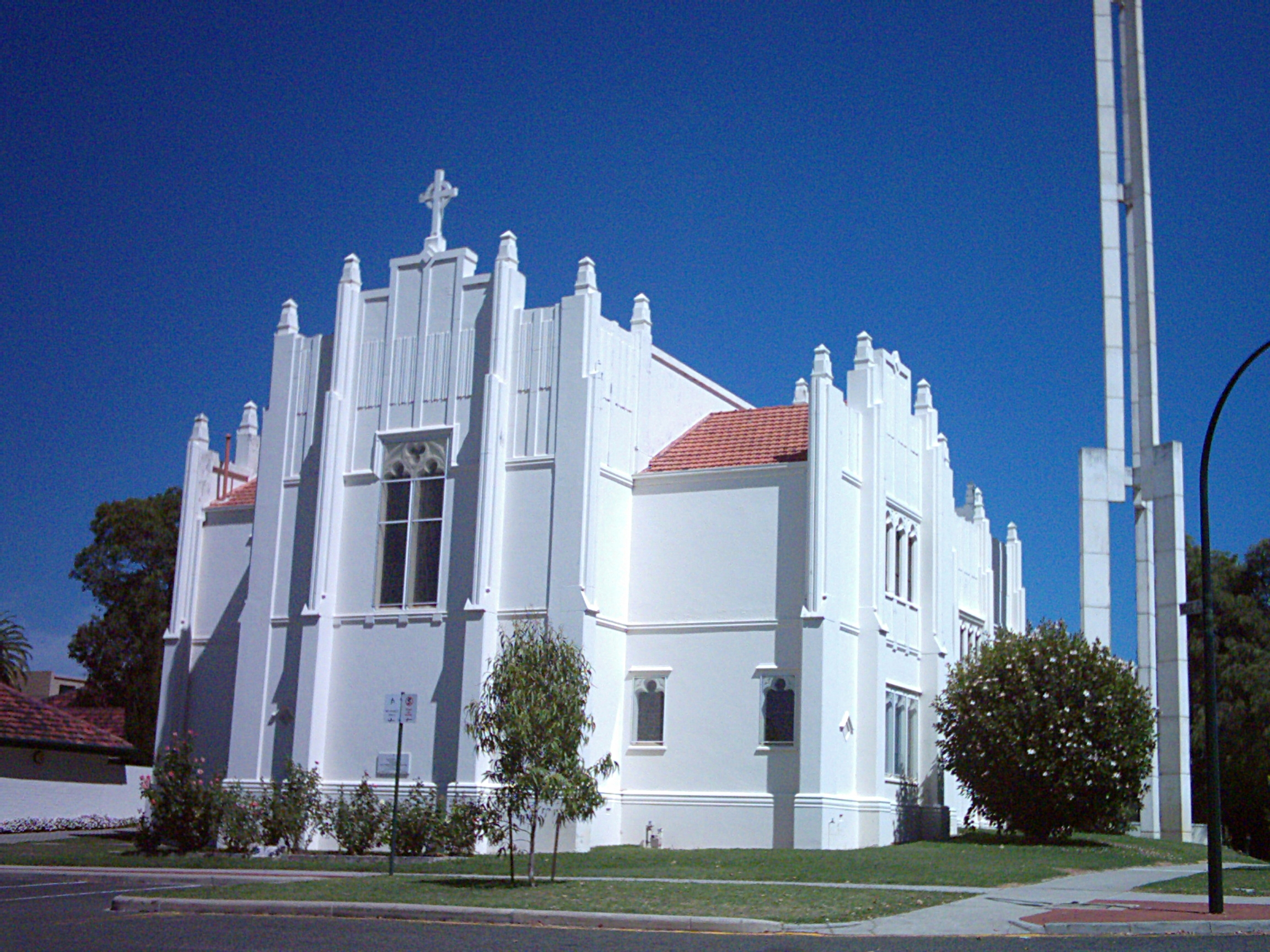
St Mary's Anglican Church, South Perth, Western Australia, designed by GH Parry

George Herbert Parry (February 1882 - 12 February 1951) was a Western Australian architect. He was born in Perth, the son of the second Anglican Bishop of Perth, Henry Hutton Parry.

Parry was educated in Perth and later at St Edmund's School in Canterbury, England. He worked in London as an architect before returning to Perth in 1907 when he joined the Public Works Department. A year later he left to join the partnership of Cavanagh and Cavanagh in Perth and in 1911 Parry established his own practice. His particular interest was in ecclesiastical work and he designed numerous churches in Western Australia. Parry was joined in practice by Marshall Clifton in 1929 and again from 1933 to 1937.

Notable buildings designed by Parry include:

- The Chapel of the Guardian Angel, built 1937, part of Sister's Kate's Children's Home, Queens Park, Perth
- St Mary's Anglican Church, South Perth, Perth
- St Cuthbert's Anglican Church, Darlington, Perth
- Burt Memorial Hall, St Georges Terrace, Perth
