= Mount St Mary Campus of the Australian Catholic University =

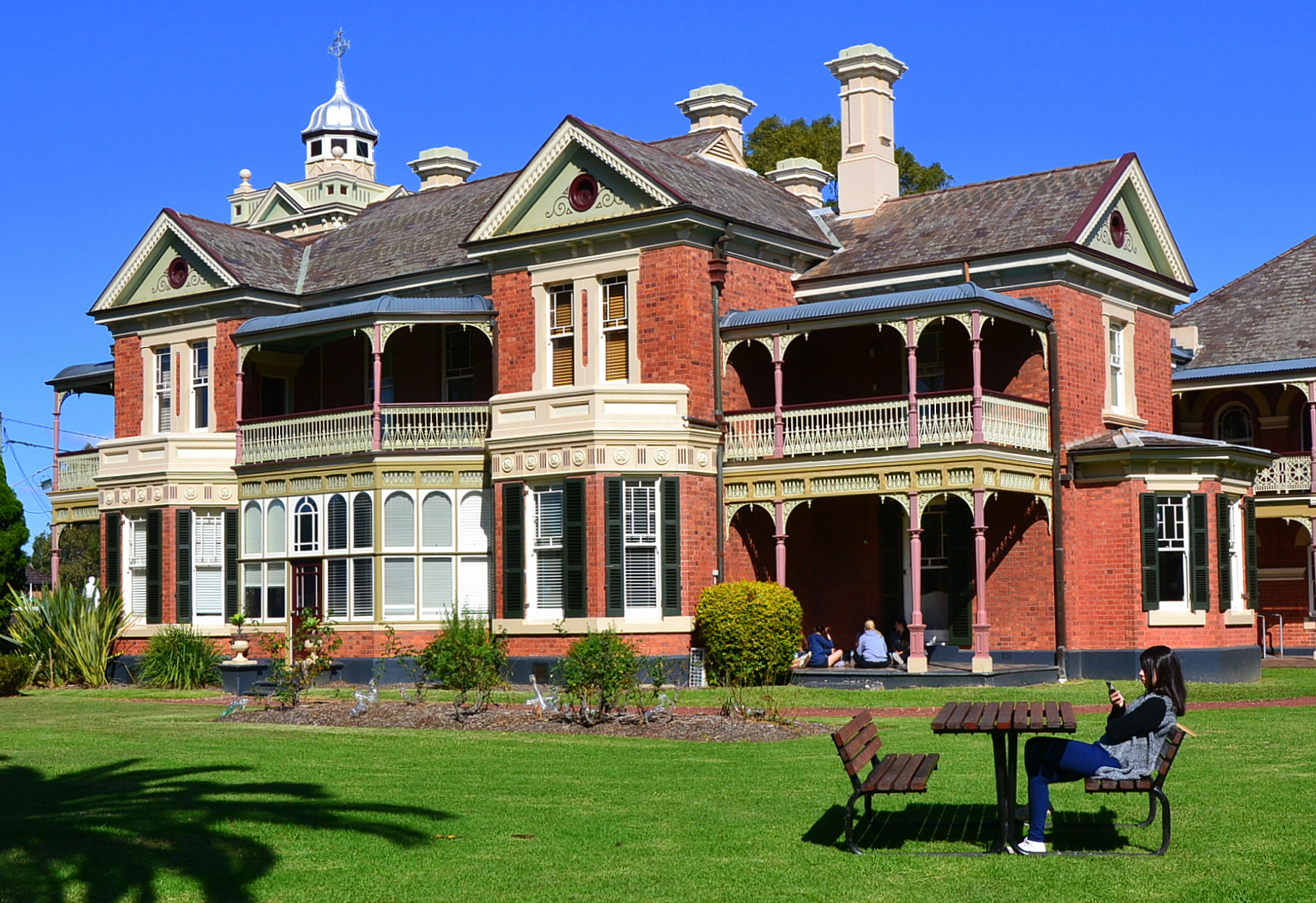
- Mount Royal, 2014

- Location within Sydney Location within Australia
- 33.8762°S 151.0764°E
- Location: 25A Barker Road, Strathfield, Sydney, Australia

History
- Built: 1887–1962

Site notes
- Architect(s): H.C. Kent; Sheerin & Hennessy; Hennessy Hennessy & Co
- Owner: Australian Catholic University; Australian Catholic University; Catholic Arch Diocese of Sydney

New South Wales Heritage Register
- Official name: Mount St Mary Campus of the Australian Catholic University; ACU; Mount St Mary Campus; Mt St Mary College; Mount Royal villa; Edmund Rice Building; Barron Chapel
- Type: state heritage (built)
- Designated: 15 April 2016
- Reference no.: 1965
- Type: University
- Category: Education

Mount St Mary Campus of the Australian Catholic University is a major campus of the Australian Catholic University, located in Strathfield, Municipality of Strathfield, Sydney, Australia.

The main building of the campus, formerly the Mount Royal villa and now called the Edmund Rice Building and Barron Chapel, is a heritage-listed former mansion, and was later used as a college and primary school. Located at 25A Barker Road in Strathfield, it was designed by H.C. Kent, Sheerin & Hennessy and Hennessy Hennessy & Co and built in 1887 (with renovations in 1962 to adapt it to university use). It was added to the New South Wales State Heritage Register on 15 April 2016.

The campus is owned by the Roman Catholic Archdiocese of Sydney.

== History ==
=== Indigenous history ===
The traditional Indigenous custodians of the area are the Wangal people of the Darug people. There is evidence that the Darug have lived in the Sydney area for over 10,000 years.

The British colonisation of Australia commenced just 15 kilometres (9.3 mi) to the east of Strathfield at Sydney Cove in 1788. By 1793 land grants were being made to Europeans in the Strathfield area. Land clearing removed the habitats of native animals and thus would have eliminated food sources for the Wangal people as well as desecrating sacred sites. There is historical evidence of hostility between the early settlers and the Aboriginal people here, but by 1804, Governor King was reporting to the British Government that "the natives in the settlements (between Parramatta and Sydney) had been very quiet and in a great measure domesticated". Although Wangal people were separated from their traditional relationship with the land, many Aboriginal people continue to live in the Strathfield locality. There are few known remnants of traditional occupation such as campsites, axe grinding grooves and scarred trees in the Strathfield district.

Perhaps the most famous Wangal man was Bennelong, who became friendly with Governor Phillip. Phillip built a brick hut for him on the present site of the Sydney Opera House and that peninsular is named after him (Bennelong Point). Bennelong became one of the first Aboriginal people to visit Europe when he travelled to England with Phillip in 1792.

=== Colonial history ===
The first grants in the present day Strathfield Municipality were made in 1793 under the hand of Lieutenant-Governor Grose. The Mount St Mary ACU campus lies on part of a 450-acre (180 ha) grant made to the Chaplain of St. James Church in 1823; however, that grant soon reverted to the Crown. In 1841, the campus was part of a 256-acre (104 ha) grant made to Joseph Hyde Potts (1793–1865), then the Secretary of the Bank of New South Wales. The grant remained in the hands of his descendants until it was subdivided in the early 1880s.

Before the 1860s, settlement in the Strathfield area was clustered around inns and other service industries scattered along Parramatta Road and Liverpool Road and near the Homebush Racecourse. The 1866 subdivision of James Wilshire's estate in Strathfield known as Redmire was marketed towards well-to-do families seeking a suburban "villa" lifestyle and attracted many prominent families in Sydney society including members of parliament, senior public servants, surgeons, solicitors and businessmen. After 1877 when Redmyre railway station opened (it was renamed Strathfield railway station in 1900), the distance between Strathfield and the city was reduced to an easy 28 minutes journey although the relative expense of the service at this time helped maintain the social exclusiveness of the area. Albert Road was first listed in John Sands' Sydney and Suburban Directories in 1886. The road was one of the most fashionable streets in Strathfield and the address of numerous grand villa estates including Mount Royal.

=== Mount Royal ===
In 1883 thirty acres (12 ha) were sold for £4500 to William Von der Heyde and George Todman, tobacco merchants. Heyde was Mayor of Strathfield 1887–89. In 1885, they sold a lot of land comprising 3 acres 29 perches (1.29 ha) to A. Thomson, F.L. Barker and John Hinchcliff, wool broker, who erected a large country mansion or "villa" on this property. This residence, called Mount Royal, was designed by architect Harry Chambers Kent for John Hinchcliff using finance provided by Hinchcliff's wife, Laura Ann. Hinchcliff was another mayor of Strathfield 1890–92. Tenders for the erection of a "first class residence and stables" were advertised in The Sydney Morning Herald on 20 November 1886. According to a former archivist of the Christian Brothers who researched the history of Mount Royal, the ballroom and billiard room were added to the original building in 1888.

Little is known about John Hinchcliff although his firm was described in 1890 as "one of the oldest firms connected with the wool trade in NSW". He appears to have been among those city wool merchants who experienced financial difficulties as a result of the severe financial depression of the 1890s. When he died at Mount Royal in 1895, he was heavily in debt. Several photographs of the interior of Mount Royal survive from the period of Hinchcliff family ownership. The original lettering "Hinchcliff" is still marked on the building and it is believed that a face pictured in one of the stained glass windows there is a portrait of John Hinchcliff.

Following Hinchcliff's death, Mount Royal was leased to schoolmaster, W. Stewart Page, who temporarily opened a college on the site in 1896, one of a number of private colleges in the area. Page placed an advertisement in The Sydney Morning Herald in January 1896 for his "high class boarding and day school... quite in the country, having open fields on three sides and at the same time is only a short distance from Strathfield Station". The school grounds included tennis courts and cricket grounds. Page's school was not a success, and by 1899, the property was again vacant.

The most notable tenant in ensuing years was Sir George Reid, Premier of New South Wales from 1894 to 1899. In 1901, Reid became a member of the Federal Parliament. Reid's occupation of Mount Royal was brief, lasting only from March 1903 until August 1904 when he became Prime Minister and moved to Melbourne.

=== The Christian Brothers and Mount St Mary ===
Mount Royal was sold to the Christian Brothers on 20 December 1907 for £7,428. The Brothers purchased the property with the intention of opening a training college for teachers. The Brothers renamed it Mount St Mary, placing it under the patronage of Mary, mother of Jesus. Mount St Mary would become the centre of the Christian Brothers congregation for the whole of Australia and New Zealand.

When the Christian Brothers purchased Mount Royal, the order was 105 years old. The Christian Brothers were founded in Waterford, Ireland by Edmund Ignatius Rice in 1802 and became closely tied to education as expressed by their motto: Facere et docere ('To Do and To Teach'). An early attempt to establish the order in Australia in the 1840s failed. The Brothers returned to Australia in 1868 and eventually Sydney where they established community houses and schools at Balmain (1887), Lewisham (1891) and Rozelle (1892). The order was one of many invited by Archbishop Moran into New South Wales at this time, primarily to support the Catholic education system after the withdrawal of state funding.

The Christian Brothers' Provincial, Brother Jerome Barron (1858–1949), had hesitated about purchasing a mansion as grand as Mount Royal, but was impressed by the size of the estate and its reasonable price compared with similar inner city properties. The Christian Brothers were not alone in acquiring such an estate at this time. The purchase of Mount Royal was part of a wider pattern that saw numerous large Victorian period mansions bought by religious orders or charities following the economic depression of the 1890s. Contemporary examples in Strathfield include the purchases of Shubra Hall by the Presbyterian Ladies' College in 1889 and Brundah by the Methodist Church in 1915, both to establish educational institutions.

Cardinal Moran blessed the Mount St Mary Training College and Novitiate on 1 December 1908 in the presence of a large gathering. At the opening, Brother Barron noted that the order in Australia had grown to 45 educational establishments and their teaching force had grown from three brothers to over 200 brothers. Training at Mount St Mary began in December 1908 when the novices and scholastics (brothers undergoing teacher training) were transferred from Lewisham. The Brothers acquired an additional 3 acres 29 perches (1.29 ha) from Mr. J.H. Potts of Hyde Brae.

The Brothers carried out alterations and addition to the original Mount Royal villa. In 1908–9, architects Sheerin & Hennessey designed a new two-storey wing to provide additional accommodation. This wing was constructed across the northern end of the building and involved the removal of the conservatory. Sheerin & Hennessey also designed a chapel in the Federation Gothic style that was constructed at the northern end of the new wing. Further additions were made in 1913. These works involved the raising of the ballroom roof to provide a first floor dormitory and a first floor extension to the billiard room on the western side of the villa. Sometime during the 1930s, an additional wing was constructed on the western side of Mount Royal, at its southernmost end. Elsewhere on campus, following the tradition of the Irish monastic orders, three handball courts and a pavilion were constructed. At an unknown date, an elaborate grotto was constructed. The pavilion and grotto are long gone.

=== Ovalau and Ardross ===
In 1917 and 1918 respectively, the Christian Brothers purchased adjoining villa estates to the northeast of Mount Royal, known as Ovalau (for £3,250) and Ardross (for £2,000), thereby expanding the boundaries of the site to 10 acres (4 ha).

Ovalau was a grand Victorian Italianate Style mansion that had been built for Robert Phillips, a South Sea planter, in 1888. The villa was initially used to accommodate teacher trainees and the Brothers who taught at the Burwood parish school. In 1922, Ovalau, since renamed St. Enda's, became a High School known as the Juniorate, providing for boys who had a possible interest in joining the Order. The mansion was demolished in the early 1960s to make way for St. Edmund's Building. Ardross had been built for the Morgan family in 1885. The mansion was purchased to provide a possible retirement place for old Brothers and renamed St. Joseph's. Growth within the college, however, meant that the mansion soon became the home of the Scholastics. It was later used as a second home for the Juniorate boys. After a period of vacancy, the building was partially destroyed by fire in 1961 and soon after demolished.

In 1925, an agreement was reached with Strathfield Municipal Council to incorporate a section of Albert Road into the college campus in exchange for land that enabled Council to connect Albert and Barker Roads. Mount Royal's gates were moved to their current location around this time. This new section of Albert Road would later be closed to create Mount Royal Reserve.

=== Baron Chapel and Mullens Building ===
With the opening of the Juniorate in the 1920s, the small Federation Gothic style chapel proved too small and in 1924 planning began for a new chapel that could accommodate 250 students and staff. The £12,400 required to construct the new chapel was raised by donation throughout Australia and New Zealand. The chapel was designed by Hennessy & Hennessey, constructed by Kell & Rigby and dedicated on 8 September 1925. The building was named the Barron Chapel in honour of Brother Jerome Barron's Golden jubilee. The design of the chapel won the Master Architect's gold medal in the Turin Exhibition of 1923.

When a new classroom and dormitory building was required to house the growing Juniorate, Hennessey & Hennessy were commissioned to designed a building to complement their design for the Barron Chapel. This building, now known as the Mullens Building, but originally known simply as the Juniorate, initially provided four classrooms on the ground floor, a dormitory, bathroom, Director's Office and several bedrooms on the first floor. The work was carried out by builder James Redmond at a cost of £8,000 and completed in 1931. Two storey brick arcades were constructed to link the Juniorate, Barron Chapel and the villa soon after.

In 1928 the St. Patrick's College Practice School opened on grounds adjoining the college to the north. This provided the student teachers with a practise school. In 1933 the Christian Brothers of Gibraltar sent to Mount St Mary's a replica of the venerated crucifix in the town of Limpias, Spain to mark the 1,900th anniversary of Christ's crucifixion. This life-size crucifix, known as the Limpias Crucifix, still stands in its concrete shrine near the Barron Chapel.

In 1959 a new residential block called the Scholasticate or Seniorate was designed by Hennessy Hennessy & Co to provide accommodation for 50 scholastics as well as space for an additional lecture room and library. This building, together with a substantial brick extension constructed in 1994, is now known as the Brother Stewart Library. Also during the 1950s a substantial addition to the original Mount Royal stable building was constructed, which continued to be an important service building carrying out ancillary functions.

From 1961 the Hennessy Hennessy & Co designed St Edmunds Building was constructed on the site of the demolished Ovalau villa to provide for a new hall, science rooms, library, common room and oratory. The building was used by the Juniorate who were renamed the Juvenate at this time.

In 1974, the first lay students were enrolled in the college. The initial intake of eight students later expanded to an intake of around 50 students. The introduction of lay students—who were not in training for the priesthood—into the previously exclusive domain of the Brothers had come about for a number of reasons including a decline in vocations leading to a need for lay teachers to staff Catholic schools. There was also an increasing recognition of the role of the laity in the mission of the Church.

The establishment of the Higher Education Board of New South Wales and changes to funding structures presented new challenges to the college. Ultimately, the college amalgamated with the Polding College, itself an amalgamation of several teaching colleges, to form the Catholic College of Education, Sydney, in 1982. The Christian Brothers offered Mount Saint Mary under licence and without charge to the newly formed College. By 1985, there were 375 full-time students on the campus and 520 evening students. As a result of increased enrolments and the transfer of staff to the campus, the residential function was slowly reduced until by 1990 there were no more boarding students. The three-year diploma courses offered by the teaching colleges became a Bachelor of Education of four years, with further studies leading to a master's degree. Mount Saint Mary offered specialisations in curriculum studies, pastoral guidance and educational leadership.

In the mid-1980s, women students were accepted into undergraduate courses. These developments required changes to buildings. In 1989, for example, Geoffrey Twibill & Associates designed alterations to the Scolasticate, and the building was renamed the Brother Stewart Building.

As the colleges of advanced education expanded and offered more senior study programmes, the boundaries between the State's universities and colleges blurred. The Minister for Education proposed that colleges that met certain criteria apply for university status. Other colleges would be required to form an association with existing universities, in effect ceasing to operate as separate entities. In 1988, the Principal together with the Council of the Catholic College of Education decided to develop Mount St Mary College to meet the requirements for consideration as a university. The main obstacle was the insufficient number of enrolments. It was finally resolved that the Catholic colleges should combine to seek university status as a single entity, a process that would require the resolution of long-standing local interests and interstate rivalries.

Three years later, in January 1991, the Australian Catholic University opened following the amalgamation of four Catholic tertiary institutions: the Catholic College of Education Sydney in New South Wales, the Institute of Catholic Education in Victoria, McAuley College of Queensland, and Signadou College of Education in the Australian Capital Territory. Each of these institutions has their own histories of education and associations with a variety of religious orders including the Christian Brothers, the Dominican Sisters, the Sisters of Charity, the De La Salle Brothers, the Marist Brothers and the Sisters of St Joseph. Histories of amalgamations, relocations and transfers etc. mean that more than twenty entities contributed to the creation of the Australian Catholic University.

In 1992, after occupying the site for 84 years, the Christian Brothers vacated Mount St Mary. A Feast Day in honour of the Blessed Virgin was held in the Barron Chapel on 15 August 1992. On 3 September, a final mass was celebrated in the Gothic chapel and on 14 September, the last Brothers left Mount St Mary. In July 1993 the Provincial of the Christian Brothers commented on Mount St Mary as an:

"institution that has shaped and set some 3,000 of us on the road to a life of education of and service to the youth of this country. Mount St Mary has become a symbol of nurture and support, of stability and fidelity for Christian Brothers and their associates who accepted the challenge of considerable involvements in Catholic Education—in this country over the last 150 years."

D.M. Stewart wrote:

"The Brothers' community and administrative offices had indeed been transferred elsewhere but there remained on site many memorials to the Christian Brothers' presence and labours. The fine Romanesque chapel is known as the Barron Chapel after the great Jerome Barron while the altar commemorates Brother Ambrose Treacy, the founder of the Australasian province. Then there are buildings or lecture rooms named after others such as the Murray Hall, the Mullen Building, the Marwell Building, the McGlade, Duffy and Hanrahan lecture rooms, while Davy is associated with the Dan Stewart Library... Brothers and former students still like to return to Mount Saint Mary, to enjoy its beauty, its peace and to savour again something of the spirit that hopefully inspires the staff and students to whom has been entrusted a rich tradition that is now part of the Australian Catholic University."

=== Australian Catholic University ===
On 7 January 1993 responsibility for the operation of Mount St Mary's campus was officially transferred from the Christian Brothers to the Diocese of Sydney, who hold the property in trust on behalf of the Australian Catholic University. The Mount Royal/ Mount St Mary villa was refurbished and reopened in July 1993 as the Edmund Rice Building.

The Australian Catholic University has six campuses Australia wide. The university continues to upgrade their Strathfield campus. Major works undertaken since 1993 include: a substantial addition to the Seniorate, now the Brother Stewart Library (architect: Twibill Quinn O'Hanlon, 1994); a substantial addition to the Mullens Building, comprising the Gleeson Auditorium and Lecture Rooms; and the construction of the Biomechanics Building. Minor works include the conversion of the former stables into an Arts Centre in 1997, the conversion of the original handball courts into storage (1997), new car parking and the creation of what is now the main entrance off Barker Road.

In 2014 the Mount St Mary ACU Campus hosted around 3,600 students, including more than 100 international students, and offered the following programmes:

- Undergraduate: Arts; Exercise Science; Marketing; Social Work; Teaching; Theology and Philosophy; Visual Arts.
- Postgraduate: Arts; Education; Educational Leadership; Religious Education; Research Degrees; Social Work; Teaching.

=== The architects ===
H.C. Kent (1852–1938), designer of Mount Royal in 1887, was born in Devonshire, England and migrated to Australia with his family as an infant. After studying at Camden College, where his father was headmaster, he undertook a Master of Arts degree at the University of Sydney in 1874. He took private drawing lessons with Thomas Sapsford, who became the Architect and Building Surveyor of the Sydney City in the 1880s. He was articled to James Barnet, the Colonial Architect, and later to John Horbury Hunt. In 1882, Kent entered private practice. He formed a partnership with Henry Budden in 1889 and in 1912, architect Carlyle Greenwell joined the partnership. Many future prominent architects were articled to Kent including William Hardy Wilson, S. A. Neave and H. H. Massie in 1911. Massie became his partner in the firm in 1919. Kent retired from active involvement in 1930. Kent's work includes hospitals private residences, commercial offices and banks, schools, extensions to Randwick Racecourse, churches and woolstores. In Strathfield, his work included Mount Royal (1887), the Dill Dill McKay Institute for Blind Women in (1891), Strathfield Town Hall (1923) and alterations (1913 and 1921–23). Kent also designed Inglenook at 17 Margaret Street for merchant George Bird in 1893 and Swanton in Victoria Street for grazier Stanley Vickery. Kent served as president of the Institute of Architects in 1906–7. He was a member and organist of the Strathfield-Homebush Congregational Church. Harry Kent served as an alderman on Strathfield Council from 1903 until 1905.

John Hennessy was a prominent architect who designed the Frazer fountain in Hyde Park (1881), the Centennial Hall extensions to the Sydney Town Hall (1883), the Hordern Brothers' Drapery Store (1886) and City Tatterstall's Club in Pitt Street (1892). However, Hennessy's most enduring works are the many Catholic buildings he designed with partnership with Joseph Sheerin (1884–1912) and with his son at Hennessy Hennessy & Co (1912–23). Hennessy was a devout Catholic and close friend of Cardinal Moran. Apart from his work for the Christian Brothers on this campus, he designed the 1894 Santa Sabina building at Strathfield, St Patrick's College at Manly, St Joseph's College at Hunters Hill and St Vincent's College at Potts Point (1886). Hennessy himself lived nearby in the suburb of Burwood for forty years, serving as an alderman (1890–1895) and mayor of Burwood (1892–93). He also designed the Burwood Council Chambers (1887). The Mount St Mary ACU campus provides a rare showcase of the development of practice and changing architectural styles by a single architectural firm between 1908 and the 1960s: the substantial additions to Mount Royal (now the Edmund Rice Building), the Barron Memorial Chapel (which is listed in the Australian Institute of Architects Twentieth Century Register of Significance), the Mullens Building, the brick arcades and the Scholasticate (now part of the Brother Stewart Library).

=== Comparisons ===
The Australian Catholic University Strathfield Campus is comparable with the main campus of the University of Sydney for the effect of its grand nineteenth century building interspersed with substantial twentieth century buildings framed by high-quality landscaping. Both campuses have been progressively modified to meet changing requirements but collectively provide a gracious educational environment. The University of Sydney differs because it is much larger, it was purpose-built as an educational institution, it dates from an earlier period (1850s), and it was always a secular educational establishment, albeit associated with religious colleges adjacent to the campus such as St John's and St Paul's.

A long association of a place with the Catholic Church is not uncommon in New South Wales. Catholic Orders did sometimes purchase large, formerly private mansion estates often in the late nineteenth century as these buildings became less desirable as private residences. An example of a site nearby is the Santa Sabina Convent located nearby on The Boulevard, which has been occupied by the Dominican Sisters since 1894. Sheerin & Hennessy also designed the main buildings there.

Australian Catholic University Strathfield Campus contains two especially fine and substantially intact examples of the Interwar Romanesque Style in the Barron Chapel and the Mullens Building. Comparable examples of the Interwar Romanesque style include: St Joseph's church in Junee attributed to Albert Edmund Bates, 1929, and St Raphael's Catholic church, Parkside, Adelaide, 1916.

Australian Catholic University Strathfield Campus demonstrates the progression of the work of one architectural practice, Sheerin & Hennessy, later Hennessey & Henessey, from the Federation period through to the mid-1960s. Comparable sites that showcase the design work of one architectural firm over a long period include the Maitland Showground, in which a numerous buildings were designed by successive generations of the Pender architectural firm.

== Description ==
The Mount St Mary Australian Catholic University (ACU) Strathfield campus is located in the inner western suburbs of Sydney, 14 km from the city centre, within the Municipality of Strathfield Council. The campus is located over at least three former Victorian estates, Mount Royal, Ovalau and Ardross. Of the three villas that once stood within the existing site boundary, only Mount Royal remains. This villa now forms part of the Edmund Rice Building, which is the focal point of the campus. It is complemented by a variety of twentieth-century buildings in a carefully landscaped setting around a main axis and includes several courtyards, playing fields, roads and parking areas. There are historic landscape features and religious statutory. The heritage listing is focused on the historic core of buildings and spaces, about one third of the main lot on which most of the campus is located (Part Lot 11 DP 869042, 179 Albert Road). The heritage-listed area is approximately 1.6 hectares (4 acres) in area, as drawn on Heritage Council Plan No. 2691.

=== Significant buildings ===
==== Edmund Rice Building (incorporating the villa known as "Mount Royal") (1887, 1908–13) ====
Now used for administration, catering and functions, the original part of this building at the southern end is the mansion designed by Harry Chambers Kent for wool merchant John Hinchcliff in 1887. Originally known as "Mount Royal" this was a fine two-storey, face-brick "villa" in the "Victorian Italianate" style. Characteristics of this style apparent in the building include: asymmetrical massing, prominent tower employing classical motifs, bracketed eaves, rounded arches, faceted bay, polychromatic brickwork and stucco wall finishes. The villa has also been described as "early, influential, example of the Queen Anne Style ... It is regarded by some as the first example of the style to be wholly designed by an Australian-born architect".

In 1908–12 after the villa was acquired by the Christian Brothers and with substantial alterations and additions to the north designed by Sheerin & Hennessy, including a fine Gothic chapel, the building became known as Mount St Mary. Significant internal spaces within the original villa include the tiled entrance hall, the original drawing room and ballroom. It is described in the LEP listing as 'probably the finest of Strathfield's Victorian mansions to survive to the present day' (LEP listing for ACU, 2005, 'Description'). It is possible to stand in front of the southern elevation and see Kent's villa in its original form. The main rooms of the original villa generally demonstrate a high degree of integrity with regard to plan and finishes, especially the entrance hall and stair. Original finishes here include the encaustic tiled floor, cedar joinery, stained glass, wall mounted gas fittings and the lantern light. The original drawing room on the eastern side of the ground floor retains the original white marble columns visible in early photographs. While of only modest integrity, the eastern elevation makes an important aesthetic contribution to the main courtyard that it helps define.

==== Gothic chapel (1908–9) ====
The chapel at the northern end of the Edmund Rice building is an elegant structure in the "Federation Gothic" style designed by Sheerin & Hennessy. It has a steeply pitched gabled roof of slate with a semi-circular apse at the western end. The side walls are divided into four bays with buttresses and each bay has a pointed arched leadlight window. There is a belltower on the eastern end (LEP listing for ACU, 2005, 'Description'). It is closely enclosed by more recent buildings which may be considered intrusive.

==== The Barron Memorial Chapel (1925) ====
Also known as the " Mount St Mary College Chapel", this is an imposing "Interwar Romanesque" styled building designed by Hennessy Hennessy & Co. It is constructed of two-tone face brick with steeply pitched, slate clad roofs and stone-coloured terracotta detailing. It is entered on the south side, through a large sandstone framed arch. The top of the arch is filled with a mosaic design, above this is a row of small arches and then a large rose window. On the southeast corner of the chapel is a four-storey tower with arched openings of different sizes marking the floors. The chapel is divided by buttresses into seven bays, each with a pair of tall arched windows. An apse is at the north end and a vestry is on the east side of the apse. Ten years after completion, the interior was painted with the golden insigna of Mary on a blue background. This work was painted over in the 1970s but has since been restored. In 1970, internal alterations were made to provide for changes in liturgy, including alterations to the marble altar and the construction of a new tabernacle stand. The Barron Memorial Chapel is considered to have a high level of integrity and is still in its original function as a place of worship.

==== The Mullens building (1931) (formerly the Junoriate) ====
Designed by Hennessy Hennessy & Co this "Interwar Romanesque"-style building complements the Barron Chapel beside it. It is also a two-storey building in two-tone-face brick with steeply pitched, slate clad roofs and stone-coloured terracotta detailing. It was originally called the Juniorate and designed to provide residential and educational accommodation for priests in training. It has long since been adapted to entirely classroom and educational uses. The original entrance is behind a large arch on the south façade. The side walls are divided into eight bays which feature multi- pane double hung windows (LEP listing for ACU, 2005, 'Description'). The interiors have undergone many changes although they retain some original details.

==== Arcades in Main Central Courtyard (c. 1931) ====
One curving two-storey arcade connects the Barron Chapel to the Edmund Rice Building, 1925. A second straight two-storey arcade runs between the Barron Memorial Chapel and the Mullen Wing, c. 1930. Both brick arcades appear designed to match the Romanesque style of the Barron Chapel and the Mullens Building and are constructed of two-tone-face brickwork. The ground floors of both arcades feature arches set within shallow engaged piers and tiled flooring. The undersides of the roof on both floors are timber lined. The arcades provide a sense of cloistering reminiscent of occupation by the religious order.

==== The St Edmunds Building (1962) ====
The St Edmunds Building (formerly called the New Junoriate, built on the site of the Victorian villa Ovalau, later known as St Endra's which was demolished c. 1961): This Modern Movement brick building with multiple wings was designed by Sheerin & Hennessy in several stages. It was originally opened on 22 July 1962 as the New Juniorate and designed to provide a new hall, science rooms, library, common room and oratory for up to 98 boys in training after the Mullens Building was considered too small for this purpose. Like the Mullens Building it has since been adapted to a variety of classroom and educational uses. The west wing is included in the heritage precinct and has three storeys with a rendered arcade at the ground floor and brick walls with square window openings above. At the south end is a flat roofed section with plain brick walls providing a backdrop to a large crucifix. The south and east wings of this building are two storeys (the south and east wings are largely excluded from the heritage listing). It is good quality, carefully detailed modernist building with low-pitched roofs and aluminium framed window. Its sympathetic proportions and finishes provide a satisfying completion to the main courtyard of the university.

==== Creative Arts Building ====
The Creative Arts Building was constructed in the late nineteenth century as the original stable block of Mount Royal. It is a two-storey U-shaped building (with the 'U' now infilled) with walls of painted brick and a steeply pitched corrugated iron roof. There is a continuous rendered band around the building, denoting the level of the loft. The original section of the building has been divided into rooms of varying sizes that do not reflect the layout of the original stables. It has a substantial twentieth-century brick addition to the north which is not included in the SHR curtilage. The form and detailing of the original component of the building is representative of a small late-nineteenth-century stable.

=== Significant landscape features ===
==== Main central courtyard (southern facing) ====
This south facing courtyard is the hub of the university. It is formed between the Edmund Rice Building, Barron Chapel and the St Edmunds Building and brick arcades linking these. The area comprises lawns with intersecting brick paths and randomly spaced, mature Canary Island date palms, some set in raised circular brick walled garden beds. There are three garden beds lying parallel to the front of the villa. Two ghost gums stand at the southern end of the courtyard.

==== North Facing Courtyards ====
One north-facing grassed courtyard is formed between the Barron Chapel and the Mullens Building with the straight the brick arcade at the south and the Limpias Crucifix at the north, beneath a large fig tree. A second north-facing grassed courtyard is formed between the Barron Chapel and the Brother Stewart Library, with the rear of the Edmund Rice Building to the south. The courtyard includes a large, non-significant tent-like shade structure.

==== Gates of Mount Royal (c. 1887) ====
The gates are symmetrical, comprising a central set of two wrought iron carriage gates and matching pedestrian gates on either side, all hung from rendered masonry piers. The gates are furthermore flanked by palisade fencing. The gates were relocated after the Christian Brothers purchased neighbouring properties of Ovalau and Andross and expanded the college grounds.

==== View corridor ====
The most significant view corridor is along the axis of the roadway flanked by trees leading from Albert Road towards the Edmund Rice Building. The brick edging on this driveway is likely contemporary with the original building of Mount Royal in the 1880s.

==== Plantings ====
The roadway from Albert Road is lined with Canary Island date palms (Phoenix canariensis) planted by the Christian Brothers. The avenue of palms is terminated by two lemon scented gums (Corymbia citriodora). Other groupings of trees on the campus provide amenity but are not of heritage significance.

Two distinct—and surviving—plantings can be readily associated with the Christian Brothers period of occupation: the cypress pines planted along the Barker Road boundary and the Canary Island date palms found around the site.

The fig tree (Ficus sp.) at the northern end of the courtyard between Barron Memorial Chapel and the Mullen Building is a visually significant planting within the courtyard. Its root system, however, is damaging the Limpias Crucifix and may cause future damage to nearby buildings.

The bunya pines (Araucaria bidwillii) near ALbert Road should be retained.

==== Limpias Crucifix (1933) ====
The Limpias Crucifix is a masonry, life-size crucifix set within a concrete shelter. The walls are cast and painted to resemble stone. The crucifix is a copy of a venerated statue in the Spanish town of Limpias which was sent to Mount St Mary's by the Christian Brothers of Gibraltar in 1933 to mark the 1,900th anniversary of Christ's crucifixion.

==== Statues ====
Three white painted masonry statues of Edmund Rice, St Joseph, Mary and Jesus are located in the main courtyard.

==== Urns ====
A number of decorative masonry urns located near the Edmund Rice building may be contemporary to the villa Mount Royal.

=== Condition ===
As at 23 April 2015, the buildings and landscaping both generally well maintained.

The campus, as it presents today is the product of three distinct phases:

- the Victorian gentlemen's villa estates
- the Christian Brother's Mount Saint Mary
- the Australian Catholic University.

All three phases are represented in historic records and, to varying degrees, in fabric. The integrity of each major phase of development and structure is outlined briefly below:

- Edmund Rice: mixed integrity
- Baron Chapel: high integrity
- Mullens Building: mixed integrity
- Brick Arcades: high integrity
- St Edmund Building: mixed integrity
- Creative Arts Building: mixed integrit

=== Modifications and dates ===
This is a complex site that was pieced together through a number of different land purchases over many years. The buildings range in date from c. 1887 to the present day. Most have undergone alteration and addition over time.

== Heritage listing ==
As at 20 August 2015, the Australian Catholic University Strathfield Campus is of state significance for its historical, associational, social, research and rarity values as part of a state-wide pattern of Catholic education since the early twentieth century.

Mount St Mary Campus of the Australian Catholic University was listed on the New South Wales State Heritage Register on 15 April 2016 having satisfied the following criteria.

The place is important in demonstrating the course, or pattern, of cultural or natural history in New South Wales.

The Australian Catholic University Strathfield Campus is of state historical significance as part of a state-wide pattern of Catholic education since the early twentieth century—first for Christian Brothers, later for lay teachers within the Catholic education system and more recently as a campus for the Australian Catholic University. It is also historically significant as the headquarters for Christian Brothers in Australia and New Zealand throughout most of the twentieth century. Many of the major elements have significance for their ability to demonstrate some continuity of use by the Christian Brothers and/or the Catholic Church. The site also has historic significance as part of the pattern of Victorian villa estates that characterised this part of suburban Sydney in the late nineteenth century. The surviving fabric of the villa Mount Royal within the Edmund Rice Building represents a distinct period when such owners and occupiers were prominent in municipal affairs. Mount Royal, although altered, is among the finest of the Victorian period mansions to survive in the Strathfield area and one of few still associated with its original outbuildings, landscaped gardens and gates. The place retains many original historic alignments, brick guttering, paths of significance and landscaping elements that complement the original "Mount Royal" section of the Edmund Rice building.

The place has a strong or special association with a person, or group of persons, of importance of cultural or natural history of New South Wales's history.

The Australian Catholic University Strathfield Campus has state level significance for its associations with the Christian Brothers which lasted from 1907 to 1992. During this period, the site was the headquarters for the order in Australia and New Zealand (until 1953), and represents a range of the brothers' activities, most significantly the training of teachers and of boys with an interest in joining the order. The Brothers' association is manifest in the historical record, in whole or parts of buildings and in individual pieces of fabric, for example, the windows of the Barron Memorial Chapel. The numerous Canary Date Palms are reminiscent of the occupation by the Brothers. The statues commemorate benefactors and associations that make reference to the order and their worldwide activities. Some buildings have been named to commemorate particular Brothers, for example, the Barron Chapel named after Brother Jerome Barron, Provincial of the Christian Brothers in 1907. The Australian Catholic University Strathfield Campus has state significant associations with the architect Harry Chamber Kent (who designed Mount Royal in the 1880s) and John Hennessy's architectural offices, which produced numerous design for the Christian Brothers here over many decades. The campus is also of state significance because the Mount Royal villa was briefly (1903–04) the home of Sir George Reid, Premier of NSW 1894–1899 and Prime Minister of Australia in 1904; however, his occupation is not demonstrated by any remaining physical fabric. The campus also has local associational significance with the owners of the Victorian estates upon which it is built, especially John Hinchcliff (the original client for Mount Royal, wool-broker and mayor).

The place is important in demonstrating aesthetic characteristics and/or a high degree of creative or technical achievement in New South Wales.

The Australian Catholic University Strathfield Campus is of state aesthetic significance for the high-quality architectural design of its key elements and for its landscaping and vistas including the avenue of Canary Island date palm trees. The Mount Royal element of the Edmund Rice building is a fine example of the "Victorian Italianate" style designed by Harry C. Kent c. 1885 and considered to be one of his best residential works. The fine finishes of the villa, such as the cast iron lace, encaustic tiling and stained glass, exemplify Victorian industry and the aspirations and way of life of the wealthy at that time. The Barron Memorial Chapel and the Mullens Building and their associated arcades are excellent examples of the Interwar Romanesque Style. The place has aesthetic significance for its collection of architectural designs by a single architectural firm over more than half a century, Sheerin & Hennessy (later Hennessy, Hennessy & Co). Three courtyards have aesthetic significance, being formed between key architectural elements of the campus. There is a high degree of consistency, integrity and quality in both the architecture and landscape design across most of the site. The palm trees, planted by the Christian Brothers, make a significant contribution to the setting. Religious statutory serve as reminders of the Brother's occupation over many years. The original gates to Mount Royal continue to address Albert Road. Principal view corridors are as approached up Albert Road, along Barker Street from the east and from directly outside the main entrance on Barker Road. "Visitors to Mount Saint Mary remark on its beauty, its peaceful atmosphere and its fine array of buildings with their varied styles of architecture".

The place has a strong or special association with a particular community or cultural group in New South Wales for social, cultural or spiritual reasons.

The Australian Catholic University Strathfield Campus is of state social significance to those thousands of people who have lived and/ or learned here, a crucial site within a state-wide pattern of Catholic education—first for the Christian Brothers, later for lay teachers within the Catholic education system and most recently as a campus for the Australian Catholic University. The site also has local significance under this criterion for people in the Strathfield locality such as members of the Strathfield Historical Society who have long maintained an interest in the place and included it in a variety of publications and guides. Mount Royal appears in a wide variety of published histories and architectural studies.

The place has potential to yield information that will contribute to an understanding of the cultural or natural history of New South Wales.

The Australian Catholic University Strathfield Campus is of state research significance because the place provides insights into the activities of the Christian Brothers there including evidence of changes in function (residential to training college to university) and liturgical practice between 1907 and 1993. It is strongly illustrative of the Brothers' central mission of education. The campus also has research potential for studying stylistic change in the design output of a single architectural firm between 1908 and the 1960s. There are also potential archaeological remains associated with the demolished Victorian-era villas. While there are few remains of the villa Ovalau under the St Edmunds building, the site of Ardross near Barker Road may have archaeological potential. A number of other sites of possible, but minor archaeological potential, have also been identified.

The place possesses uncommon, rare or endangered aspects of the cultural or natural history of New South Wales.

The Australian Catholic University Strathfield Campus is of state significance for its rarity as the previous headquarters and training ground for the Catholic order the Christian Brothers, and for retaining evidence of their activities and interests including buildings, plantings, recreational facilities, chapels and statuary. The place is also rare because it demonstrates the evolving high-quality design work from a single architectural practice over many decades during the mid-twentieth century, Sheerin & Hennessy / Hennessy, Hennessy & Co.

The place is important in demonstrating the principal characteristics of a class of cultural or natural places/environments in New South Wales.

The Australian Catholic University Strathfield Campus is representative of many institutional sites across New South Wales which demonstrates long associations with the Catholic Church. Many structures from the Christian Brothers' period survive with sufficient integrity that they are capable of demonstrating much of the Brothers' way of life and philosophy. The campus is also of state representative significance as an exemplar of a widespread adaptive re-use pattern where a privately owned, late-nineteenth century 'gentleman's villa' within landscaped grounds becomes the core element of an educational institution.
