= Budden =

Budden is a surname. Notable people with the surname include:

- Amanda Budden (born 1994), Irish footballer
- Charles Budden (1879–1969), English cricketer
- Henry Budden (1871–1944), Australian architect
- James Budden (1882–1965), English cricketer
- Joe Budden (born 1980), American rapper
- John Budden (1566–1620), English jurist
- Julian Budden (1924–2007), British opera scholar and broadcaster
- Kevin Budden (1930–1950), Australian herpetologist
- Kris Budden (born 1984), American sports reporter
- Lionel Bailey Budden (1887–1956), British architect and academic
- Maria Elizabeth Budden (c. 1780–1832), English children's writer
- Ted Budden (died 2000), British politician

== See also ==
- Kent & Budden
- Kent Budden & Greenwell
- Budden & Greenwell
