= John K. Shirley =

Australian architect

John K. Shirley – Architect
- Born: 20 May 1898; Chatswood, New South Wales
- Died: 29 December 1951 (aged 53); Sydney, NSW
- Occupation: Architect
- Practice: Greenwell & Shirley (1927–35); J.K. Shirley & Colvin Architects (1949–51)
- Design: Bolaro Homestead; Adaminaby, New South Wales

John Keith Shirley (20 May 1898 – 29 December 1954) was an Australian architect known for his educational buildings for independent schools in Sydney and his substantial Inter-war houses designed in the first half of the 20th century.

== Biography ==
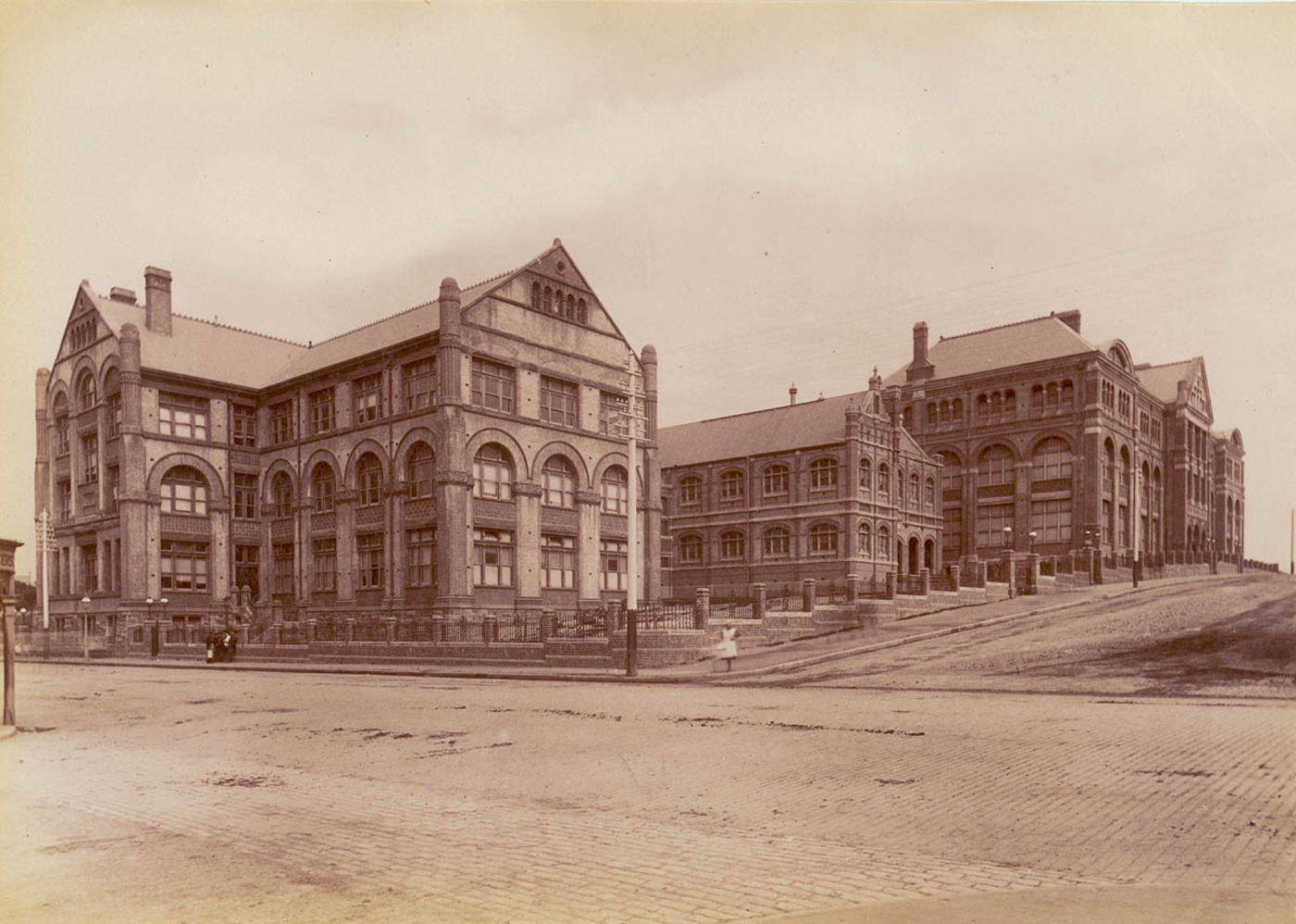
Sydney Technical College, Ultimo.

Shirley was born in Chatswood, New South Wales, and was educated at Mowbray House School and subsequently at Sydney Church of England Grammar School Shore from 1911 until 1915. Selecting architecture as his profession Shirley was articled to Kent & Budden and studied architecture at Sydney Technical College before there was a university architecture course available in Sydney. He later attended the School of Architecture at the University of Pennsylvania and was awarded a BSc(Arch) in 1922. In 1923 the Love family of Sydney commissioned Carlyle Greenwell and Shirley to design Oweenee at 3 Milray Avenue, Wollstowcraft. In 1927, he entered into a partnership with Greenwell. In 1931 Greenwell and Shirley designed the Norman House at 79 Vaucluse Road, Vaucluse in an Inter War Georgian/Mediterranean revival style. In 1933 Greenwell and Shirley designed another Georgian/Mediterranean style revival home at 16 Khartoum Avenue, Gordon. In 1935 Greenwell and Shirley designed a brick and tile symmetrical single storey bungalow with white columns and white shutters at 110 Albert Road Strathfield. In the same year the firm designed a Congregational Church in Gordon which is the last known design attributed to the firm. In 1938 Shirley designed the Assembly Hall at Barker College and a substantial homestead at Adaminaby, New South Wales. Bolaro was designed for the Osborne family in a Georgian Revival Style. After the war, during part of which he was associated with the Department of Labour and National Service, he started in practice on his own. In 1947, he designed a block of flats for Barker at 156 Pacific Highway Hornsby. In 1949, he took A. B. Colvin into partnership, having built up a good practice in industrial and scholastic work. He was one of the architects working at his old school, Shore, and prior to the war constructed classrooms and laboratories and carried out extensive remodelling to its North Sydney campus. At the time of his death, he was engaged in designing a new Assembly Hall for the school.
