= Transport House, Sydney =

Historic building in Sydney, Australia

Transport House
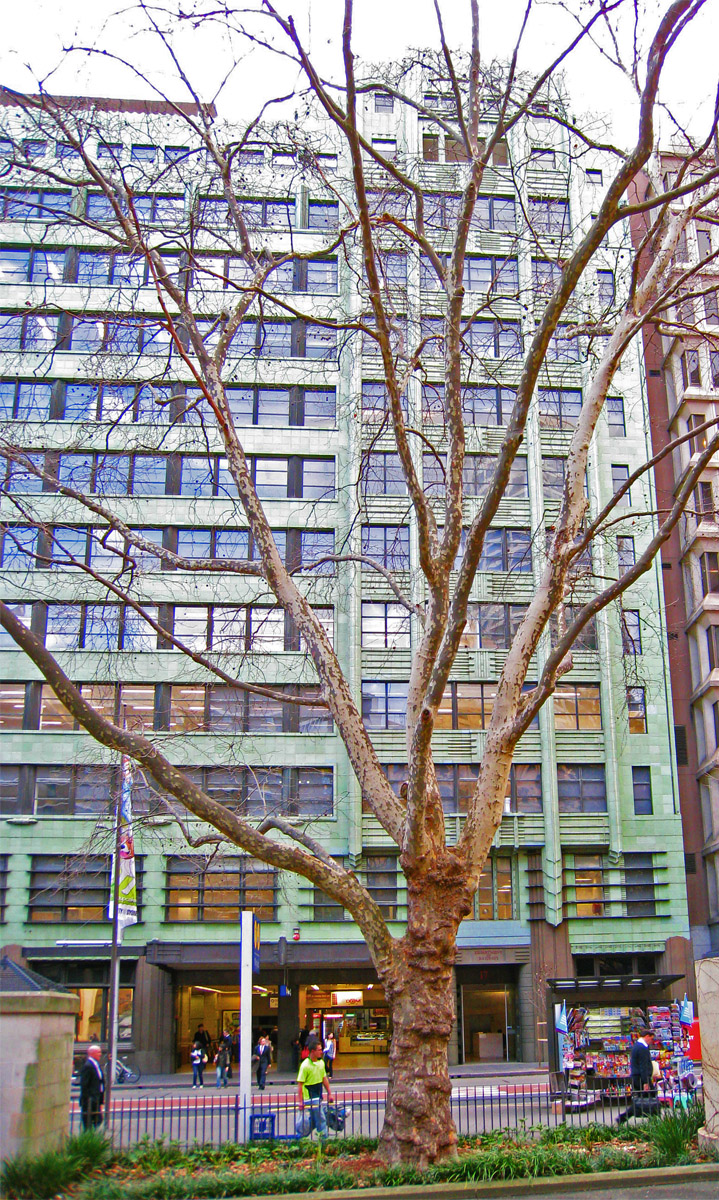

- Location within Sydney Location within Australia
- 33.8656°S 151.2055°E
- Location: 19-31 York Street, Sydney central business district, City of Sydney, New South Wales, Australia

History
- Built: 1936

Site notes
- Architect(s): Henry Budden & Mackay
- Architectural style: Inter-war Art Deco

New South Wales Heritage Register
- Official name: Transport House; Railway House; Greenhouse; Wynyard SRA Offices; Wynyard Walk
- Type: State heritage (built)
- Designated: 2 April 1999
- Reference no.: 1271
- Type: Office building
- Category: Government and Administration

The Transport House is a heritage-listed office building located at 19-31 York Street in the Sydney central business district, in the City of Sydney local government area of New South Wales, Australia. It is also known as Railway House; Greenhouse; and the Wynyard SRA Offices. The property is privately owned. It was added to the New South Wales State Heritage Register on 2 April 1999.

== History ==
Transport House, formerly Railway House, was designed by Henry Budden & Mackay and completed in 1936. The building caused enormous controversy through the use of day labour in its construction but the aesthetics and design were well received. It was described as being colourful without being vulgar, and modern without being extreme. The building was designed to accommodate all the various offices of the Railway Department and included the Commissioner's Suite and the "Trouble Room". Externally the building was faced with trachyte at the ground level and above with green toned terracotta tiles; green was the colour for the railways. Windows were set in bronze features, including wrought iron balustrading and metal window louvres. These were produced by the Department's Chullora Railway Workshops. The building won the Sir John Sulman Medal in 1935 and the Royal Institute of British Architects Medal in 1939. The interiors have been progressively adapted since its construction, particularly the lift and entrance lobbies. The most substantial impact has been in the demolition of the northern wall to permit access to the adjoining building.

== Description ==
Transport House is a twelve-storey steel frame office building above Wynyard railway station, designed by H. E. Budden & Mackey in the Inter-war Art Deco style. The framed structure supports a broad, asymmetrically facade, with horizontal bands of large bronze-framed windows. Contrast is provided by a modulated tower vertically emphasised by fins. Above ground floor the facade is clad in green terracotta tiles. The building features two main entrances incorporating stairs and escalators leading to Wynyard station. The interior of the building retains original office fitouts with fine timber joinery and decorative plaster ceilings. The first floor windows are notable for their individual design. Awarded the Sulman Medal in 1935 and the RIBA Medal in 1939, this building is an elegant example of 1930s commercial architecture. Transport House forms part of a group of buildings of a similar scale. Fragments of the underground railway spaces between George Street and Railway House, also designed by H. E. Budden & Mackey, survive in York Street.

== Significance ==
The scale and architectural quality of Transport House is a reflection of the importance of the Railway system to Sydney and NSW. It also documents the process of centralisation and rationalisation of state administration. Transport House is one of the most intact Art Deco buildings in Sydney, and one of the earliest fully resolved Art Deco expressions in the Sydney central business district. It is an important building by prominent firm of H. E. Budden and Mackay, and was awarded a Sulman Medal in 1935 and Royal Institute of British Architects Medal in 1939. Substantial important intact office interiors survive. The building is rare for its scale and extensive use of green terracotta facing, considered the most impressive in Sydney. It is a major element in the townscape of Wynyard Square precinct.

== Heritage listing ==
Transport House was listed on the New South Wales State Heritage Register on 2 April 1999.

== See also ==
- Australian non-residential architectural styles
