= Alan Nangle =

Australian architect (1910–1994)

- Born: Alan Porter Nanagle; 23 January 1910; Sydney New South Wales
- Died: 14 June 1994 (aged 84); Killara, New South Wales
- Education: Trinity Grammar; Newington College; Sydney Technical College
- Occupation: Architect
- Known for: Sydney Independent Schools and Association of the Great Public Schools architecture
- Parent: James Nangle OBE (1868-1941)

Alan Porter Nangle (23 January 1910 – 14 June 1994) was an Australian architect active during the mid-20th century. He worked on many independent school campuses when he become a partner in architectural firms associated with his mentor Henry Budden.

== Early life ==
Nangle was one of four children born to Helen (née Van Heythuysen) and James Nangle OBE. His father was an architect and his parents were communicant members of the Congregational Union of Australia. He had two older brothers and a sister. Living with his family in the inner western suburbs of Sydney he commenced school at Trinity Grammar, then at Dulwich Hill, in 1920. In 1924 Nangle and his elder brother John enrolled at Newington College, a Great Public School nearby in Stanmore. Unlike his brother who also became an architect, Nangle didn’t sit the Intermediate or Leaving Certificates at Newington. On the completion of his high school years in 1926 he was articled to Henry "Harry" Ebenezer Budden CBE and commenced studying architecture at Sydney Technical College in 1927. As a college student he initially worked as a draftsman with consulting engineers Woolacots in Sydney.

== Budden & Nangle ==
In 1899, Harry Budden and his colleague Harry Kent formed Kent & Budden Architects, which then became Kent, Budden & Greenwell in 1911, Budden & Greenwell in 1919, and then Budden & Mackey in 1931. In 1940, the firm became Budden & Nangle when Nangle joined the practice. In 1951, the firm was again expanded to Budden, Nangle & Michael Architects, with the addition of Roy Michael as partner. Nangle retired in 1969 but the firm continues in Sydney in 2023 as BNMH Architects Pty Ltd.

== 1940s & war service ==
In 1941, Nangle married Elsie McCrea and the couple moved to Killara, New South Wales, and had two children. During World War II, Nangle served in the Second Australian Imperial Force in the 17th Army Field Company with the Royal Australian Engineers.

== School architecture ==
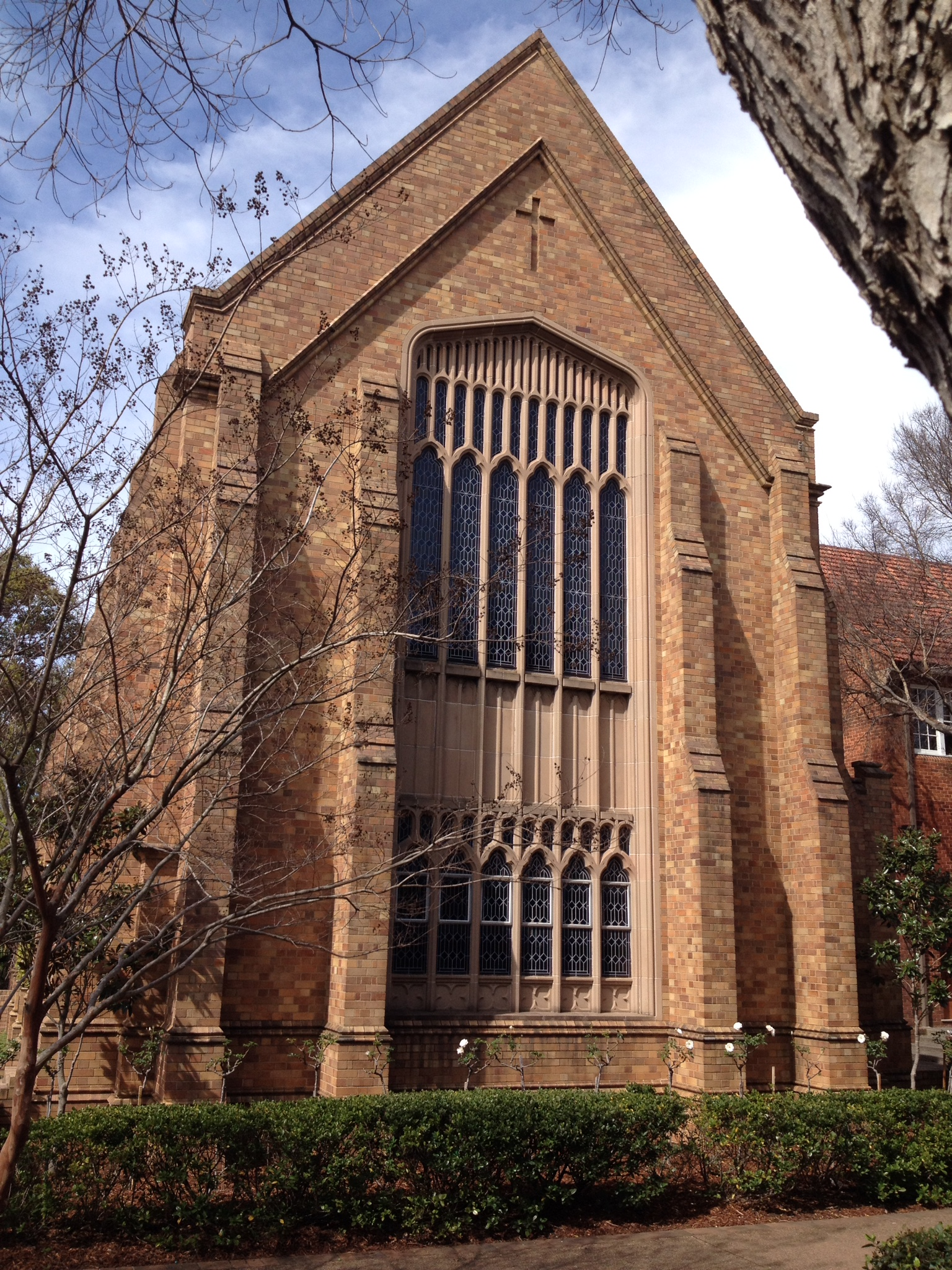
The War Memorial Chapel at Trinity Grammar School was designed in 1956 by Alan Nangle and Frederick Rice

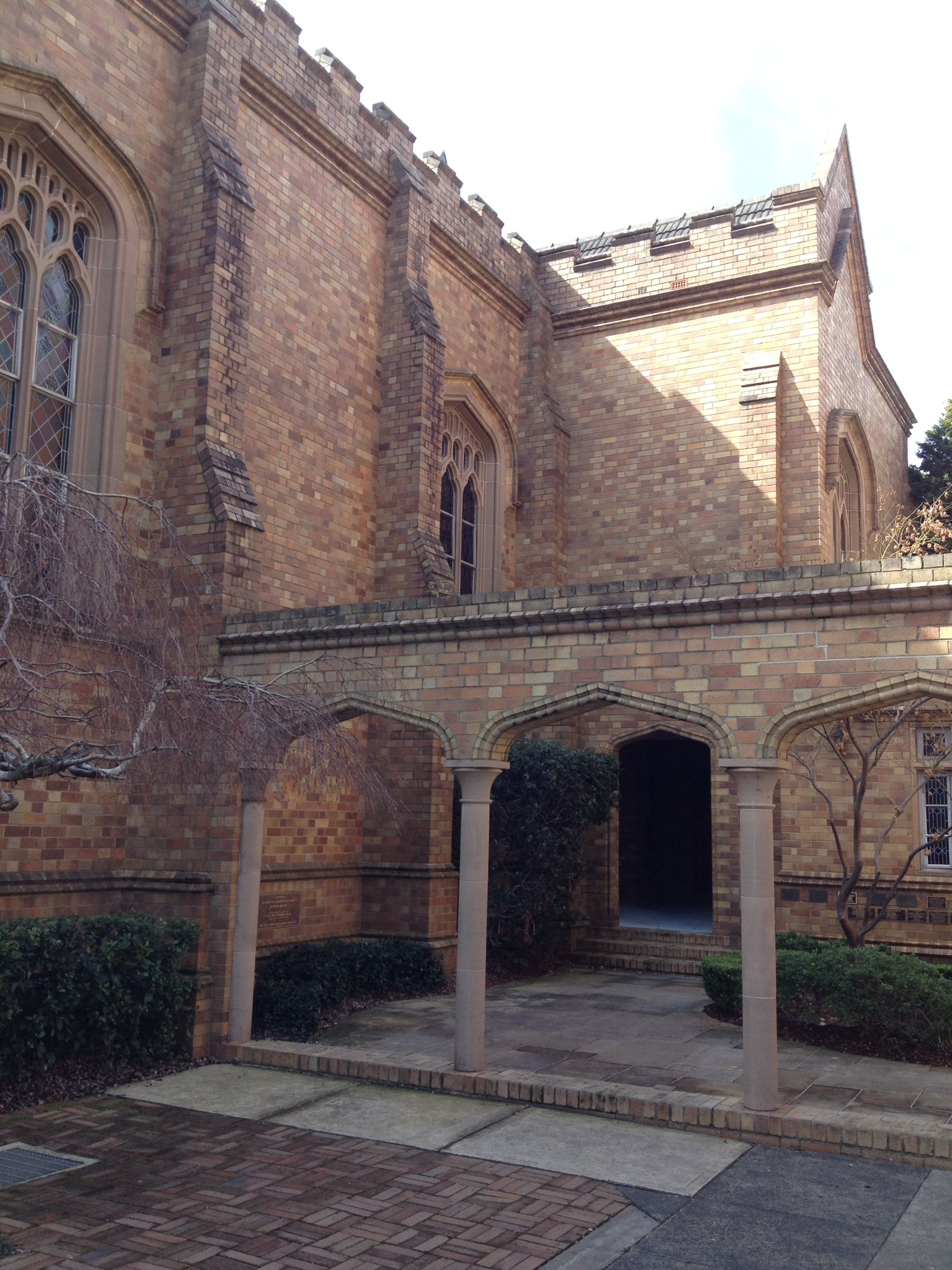
Side view of the Trinity Chapel from the quadrangle

In 1945, Albury Grammar School (now The Scots School Albury) commissioned Nangle to design buildings for its Perry Street Albury campus. In 1948 Nangle completed a major new building for the Presbyterian Ladies College in Orange (now Kinross Wolaroi School). Known at the time as the Home Building it contained dormitories accommodating fifty two boarding students with no more than four being in any one room, a sick bay, sun room and toilet facilities. As early as 1943 the idea of a war memorial chapel at Trinity Grammar in Sydney was being discussed. The design and construction of this ecclesiastical structure was completed in just over twelve months being opened in 1957. It was designed by Nangle as an Old Trinitarian assisted by another old boy Fredrick Rice. In the 1950s and 1960s Nangle joined fellow Old Newingtonian architects Hedley Carr (1904–1966) and Peter Kaad (1898–1967) in designing numerous buildings on Newington's Stanmore campus. Colonel Alfred Warden VD (1868–1955) and Eric Heath (1894–1952) were foundation members of the panel. The panel designed the War Memorial Science Block, the Prescott Block, the Nesbit Wing, the Le Couteur Annex, the Centenary Hall and a new brick Stewart Spence Gymnasium replacing the original timber gym built in 1890. In the 1960s Nangle designed a gymnasium and swimming pool for the North Sydney campus of Shore School. Further work at Trinity included the science block in 1962 and the arts and music centre in 1969. Again at Newington Nangle designed a preparatory school complex at Lindfield in 1967. Built around an existing 1930s Tudor Revival Style home the new school buildings were constructed in clinker bricks with blackened vertical timber detailing in a style now reminiscent of the Sydney School architecture popular at the time.

== Architectural family ==
The extended Nangle family has produced multiple generations of Sydney architects. James Nangle (1868–1941) was born in Newtown. He left school at the age of eleven to labour in a brick yard. He completed his first apprenticeship as a carpenter and joiner before moving on to become a clerk of works. He studied architecture at Sydney Technical College (STC) and later at the University of Sydney under John Sulman. He began practice as an architect in 1893 and two years later was appointed to the part-time staff of the school of architecture at STC. In 1905 he became head of the school. In January 1913 he was appointed superintendent of technical education in NSW, a position he retained until his retirement in 1933. At the end of World War I he was appointed director of vocational training for ex-servicemen for which he was appointed OBE in 1921. He was a keen amateur astronomer and was elected a Fellow of the Royal Astronomical Society in England in 1918 and became the NSW Honorary Government Astronomer in 1921. He was president of the Royal Society of New South Wales, a member of the University of Sydney Senate and a member of NSW Board of Architects. He was the author of numerous papers and books on architecture, construction, education and astronomy. For nearly fifty years he served the NSW chapter of the Australian Institute of Architects in various capacities before being elected its president in 1936. The middle of James Nangle's three sons John Edwin Thomas Nangle (1908–1977) practiced as an architect in Sydney from 1932 until 1969. His grandson James Alan Nangle (born 1947) is a semi-retired architect and town planner.
