= Charles Budden =

English cricketer

Personal information
- Born: 18 July 1879; Fareham, Hampshire, England
- Died: 26 November 1969 (aged 90); Winchester, Hampshire, England
- Bowling: Right-arm fast-medium

Domestic team information
- Years: Team
- 1900: Hampshire

Career statistics
Competition	First-class
Matches	2
Runs scored	35
Batting average	17.50
100s/50s	0/0
Top score	32*
Balls bowled	168
Wickets	2
Bowling average	51.00
5 wickets in innings	0
10 wickets in match	0
Best bowling	1/30
Catches/stumpings	0/–
- Source: Cricinfo, 3 January 2010

Charles Budden (18 July 1879 – 26 November 1969) was an English first-class cricketer.

Budden was born at Fareham in July 1879. He played first-class cricket for Hampshire in 1900, making two appearances against Warwickshire at Edgbaston, and Yorkshire at Hull. A member of a weak Hampshire side which finished bottom in the County Championship, Budden took 2 wickets as a fast-medium bowler, though his most notable feat as a Hampshire player was his 32 not out made against Warwickshire, where he put on a 54 run partnership for the final wicket with Harry Baldwin. A resident of Southampton, Budden was employed as the cricket professional for Strathmore Cricket Club in Scotland in 1902, sufficiently impressing them enough to be re-engaged as their professional for the following season. He returned south in 1904, where he was the professional at Exeter Cricket Club. While playing for Exeter, Budden appeared in minor counties cricket for Devon in 1906, making four appearances in the Minor Counties Championship. He died at Winchester in November 1969.
