= Henry Budden =

Australian architect

Henry Budden CBE
- Born: 11 August 1871; Rockley, New South Wales
- Died: 25 December 1944 (aged 73); Sydney, New South Wales
- Education: Sydney Technical College; The University of Sydney; Royal Academy
- Occupation: Architect
- Awards: Sir John Sulman Medal (1933 & 1936)
- Practice: Kent & Budden (1899–1912); Kent Budden & Greenwell (1912–19); Budden & Greenwell (1919–22); H. E. Budden (1922–1931); H. E. Budden & Mackey (1931–1939); H. E. Budden (1939–1940); Budden & Nangle (1940–44)
- Buildings: David Jones, Elizabeth Street, Sydney (1925)
- Projects: Housing development, Prince Edward Parade, Hunters Hill (1899–1912)
- Design: Primary Producers Bank, 105 Pitt Street, Sydney (Sulman Medal 1933); demolished 1964; Railway House (Sulman Medal 1936)

Henry "Harry" Ebenezer Budden CBE (11 August 1871 – 25 December 1944) was a Sulman Award winning Australian architect active in the first 40 years of the 20th century. His work encompassed the styles of the Federation Arts and Crafts and Bungalow through to the Inter-War Stripped Classical and Art Deco. He was a leader of his profession and in the wider community, serving as the first Australian War Chest Commissioner during World War I.

== Family and early life ==
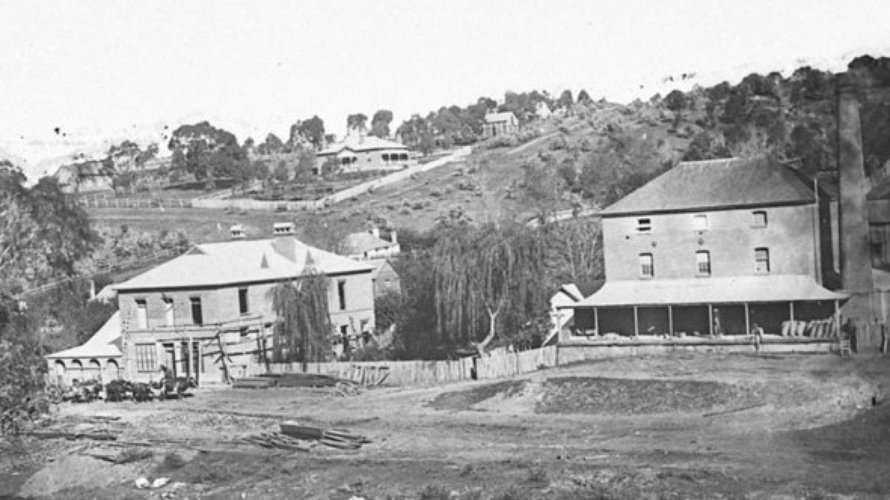
Budden's store and Stanger's Flour Mill, Rockley, in the 1870s

Budden was born in Rockley, New South Wales, the son of Sarah Hale (née Stanger) and Arthur Budden. His mother's family were flour millers and his father was a bank manager and store keeper who was born in Braintree, Essex, England. The Budden and Stanger families were active and committed members of the Congregational Church.

Bathurst is the nearest major town to Rockley and Budden travelled there daily to attend Bathurst Superior Public School. At 14 years of age, he commenced senior education, in Sydney, as a boarding student of Newington College (1886–1888). His three years at Newington coincided with the headmastership of William Henry Williams.

In 1889, Budden was articled in architecture to Harry Kent and in the ensuing five years studied at Sydney Technical College and the University of Sydney.

=== Sulman Scholarship ===
In 1894, he won the John Sulman Travelling Scholarship and studied in Europe. Budden attended the Royal Academy in London and became an associate by examination of the Royal Institute of British Architects. After travelling on the Continent, he returned to England and worked in the office of Sir Aston Webb. He then crossed the Atlantic and worked in the Boston firm of Peabody & Stearns before returning to Australia via San Francisco.

== Architectural career ==
=== Hunters Hill ===
The Budden family moved to the Sydney suburb of Hunters Hill in 1892 and Henry resided there until 1910.

From 1887 Arthur Budden had owned two hectares (four acres) of land on Woolwich Road and from 1899 he developed housing and a street known as Blake Avenue that gave access to Prince Edward Parade. The houses were designed by Henry Budden, with his father as the developer, and today are found at: 41 Woolwich Road, Wallawa; 43 Woolwich Road, Gunagulla; 2 Prince Edward Parade, Wirringulla; and 4 Prince Edward Parade, Lucknow. The speculative land and building aspirations of father and son came to fruition with the completion in 1912 of houses at 1 and 3 Prince Edward Parade. In this exercise the Budden's showed enlightened town planning and architectural principles. These houses form part of the Sunnyside Estate and are listed on the local government heritage register.

At first Henry Budden lived in Hunters Hill with his parents at Moocooboolah, 65 Alexandra Street, until he married the girl next door, Ella Thomas, in 1902. As a couple they lived in a house designed by Budden, Morillah, at 54 Woolwich Road. This house, with Kurrowah at 74 Alexandra Street, distinctly shows the emerging asymmetrical style of Budden as his angles take advantage of the northerly sun and river aspect of this suburb. Budden's most distinctive design in Hunters Hill is Mornington at 16 Vernon Street, completed in the Federation Bungalow style at its most creative.

=== War Chest Commission ===
At the outbreak of World War I, Budden was appointed 1st War Chest Commissioner by the Minister for War. This was an honorary appointment and Budden sailed for Egypt in July 1915 with full authority to reorganise and administer the distribution of comforts to Australian troops on active service. These comforts had been made available by various Australian charities. In April 1916, he sailed from Egypt to London and continued his work in England and France, until his return to Australia in 1917. The following year he was honoured by the award of Commander of the Order of the British Empire for his services rendered.

=== Architectural partnerships ===
On Budden's return to Sydney, in 1899, he entered into partnership with his mentor, Harry Kent and the firm became known as Kent & Budden.

In 1913, Henry Kent and Henry Budden were joined in partnership by Carlyle Greenwell. Greenwell had served his articles with Kent & Budden and after attending Sydney Technical College and the University of Sydney he had completed a Bachelor of Architecture at the University of Pennsylvania.

The partnership of Kent, Budden and Greenwell was dissolved in 1919 with the departure of Harry Kent. Budden and Greenwell continued to work in partnership until 1922 and Kent joined H H. Masie and practiced with him until his retirement in 1930.

On two occasions between partnerships, 1922–1931 and 1939–1940, Budden worked as a sole-trader under the name of H. E. Budden. He worked in conjunction with other Sydney architects on particular projects during this time.

From 1931 until 1939, Budden was in partnership with Nicholas Mackey. In the Sydney central business district, in 1938 the partnership designed Railway House, York Street, and in 1939 the former Metropolitan Water Sewerage & Drainage Board Building in Pitt Street.

From 1940, until his death, Budden practiced in partnership with Alan Nangle.

== Personal life ==
=== Congregational Church and Newington College ===
Throughout the 45 years that Budden worked as an architect in New South Wales, two institutions had a strong influence on his commissions and partnerships – his church and his school. Harry Kent, Henry Budden and Carlyle Greenwell, and their extended families, were all active Congregationalists at a time when that Christian denomination was very influential in the upper middle classes of Sydney society and business. Much of his firms' work came from the church itself and from members of its parishes. As an Old Newingtonian, Budden served on the Council of the college, as an honorary architect and as President of the Old Newingtonians' Union. He employed and worked with many Old Newingtonians during his professional career including Carlyle Greenwell, William Hardy Wilson, Eric Heath and his final partner Alan Nangle. As with the church, the Newington community provided a good deal of work for Budden's firms. Sydney was a small and parochial city until World War II and this was Henry Budden's social and professional milieu.

=== Community involvement ===
- President – Old Newingtonians' Union (1920)
- President – Institute of Architects of NSW (1931–1932)
- Government Nominee – NSW Board of Architects (1924–1944)
- Life Governor – Royal Prince Alfred Hospital (1927)

=== Family life and death ===
From 1910, Budden and his wife lived at Kingsbury, Powell Street, Killara. They had two sons (Philip and Thomas) and five daughters (Joan, Janet, Alice, Louise and Helen), all of whom survived him on his death in Sydney in 1944.

== Partial list of works ==
The following buildings designed either in part or in full by Budden:

Buildings designed either in part or in full by Henry Budden
Building name	Image	Location	Year completed	Award(s)	Heritage register(s)	Notes
Emu Creek		Emu Creek Road, Walcha	1908			
The Whurley		26 Cleveland Street, Wahroonga	1913			
Griffith Teas building		Wentworth Avenue, Surry Hills	1912		Local government register	
Mothers and Wives Memorial to Soldiers		Potts Point / Woolloomooloo	1922			
David Jones		Corner of Elizabeth Street and Market Street, Sydney	1927		Local government register	
Brassey House		Barton, Australian Capital Territory	1927			
Extensions and renovation to Hotel Metropole (demolished in 1970)		Bent, Phillip and Young Streets, Sydney	1929; 1935			
Primary Producers Bank (demolished in 1964)		105 Pitt Street, Sydney	1933	Sulman Medal		
Railway House		19–31 York Street, Sydney	1936	Sulman Medal	NSW State Heritage Register	
Transport House		99 Macquarie Street, Sydney	1938			
Metropolitan Water Sewerage & Drainage Board Building (former)		Pitt Street, Sydney	1939		NSW State Heritage Register	

== See also ==
- List of Australian architects

Professional and academic associations
Preceded by James Peddle	President of the Institute of Architects of New South Wales; 1931–1932	Succeeded by Ernest Alfred Scott
