= Kent Budden & Greenwell =

Australian architectural practice

Kent Budden & Greenwell was an Australian architectural practice working in Sydney from 1913 until 1919. The partners were Harry Kent, Henry Budden and Carlyle Greenwell.

== History ==
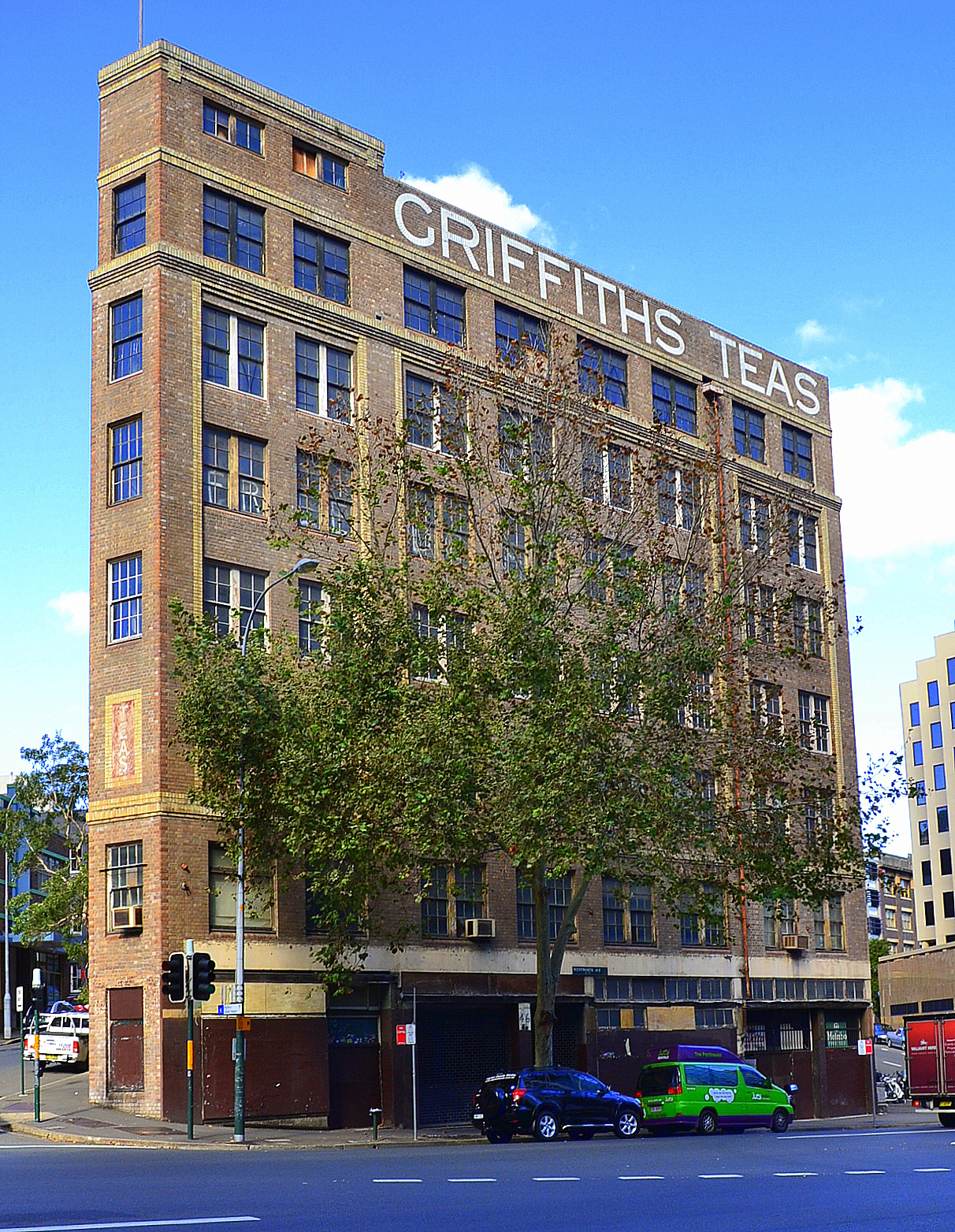
Griffiths Teas, Wentworth Avenue, Surry Hills was designed by Kent Budden & Greenwell

In 1899 Henry Budden entered into partnership with his mentor, Harry Kent, and the firm became known as Kent & Budden. In 1913, Kent and Budden were joined in partnership by Carlyle Greenwell who had served his articles with Kent & Budden. The partnership of Kent, Budden and Greenwell was dissolved in 1919 with the departure of Kent. Budden and Greenwell continued to work in partnership until 1922 and Kent joined H H Masie and practiced with him until his retirement in 1930. In 1919 Budden and Greenwell separated as partners. From 1931 until 1939, Budden was in partnership with Nicholas Mackey. From 1940, until his death, Budden practiced in partnership with Alan Nangle and the firm continues today as BNMH Architects.
