= Harry Kent (architect) =

English-born Australian architect

Harry Kent – Architect
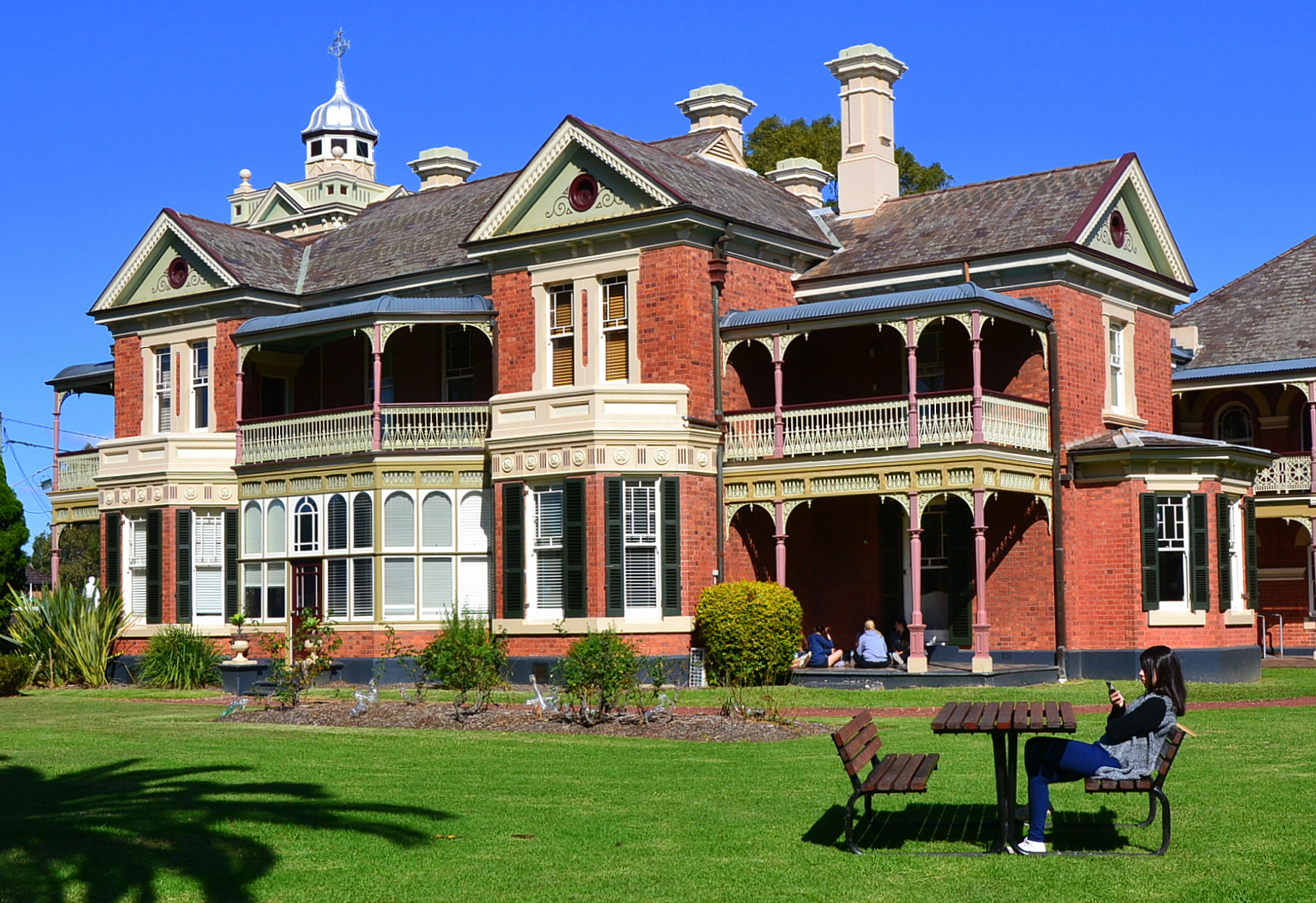
- Mount Royal (now Australian Catholic University), Strathfield
- Born: 1852; Devonshire, England
- Died: 1938 (aged 85–86); Sydney, Australia
- Occupation: Architect
- Practice: Harry C. Kent (1882–1899); Kent & Budden (1899–1912); Kent Budden & Greenwell (1912–19); Kent & Massie (1919–1930)
- Buildings: State Heritage Register: Former CBC Bank (Cnr George & Barrack Streets Sydney) built between 1921–25; Extensions to Mariners Church in 1927 (98–100 George Street Sydney)

Harry Chambers Kent (1852–1938) was an English-born Australian architect. He was Sydney-based during the late 19th and early 20th centuries and a leader of his profession as President of the Institute of Architects of NSW (1906–07). During his career he was associated with the design of over 670 buildings. Many of his designs are heritage listed and two are on the New South Wales State Heritage Register.

== Early life ==
Kent was born in Devonshire, England, the son of the Rev. Samuel Chambers Kent and his wife Emily Deacon. A year after his birth, the Kent family emigrated to Australia and the Reverend Kent was appointed Principal of the Camden College in Newtown, Sydney. Harry Kent was educated at Camden College and the University of Sydney where he graduated with a Master of Arts in 1875. Before his graduation Kent was articled to James Barnet, the New South Wales Colonial Architect, and in 1873 to John Horbury Hunt.

== Congregational Church ==
Kent and his extended family were all active Congregationalists at a time when that Christian denomination was very influential in the upper middle classes of Sydney society and business. Much of his firm's work came from the church and members of its parishes. Despite his father leaving the church in 1879 for the Anglican Church of Australia, Kent maintained a lifelong dedication to the Congregational church.

== Strathfield ==
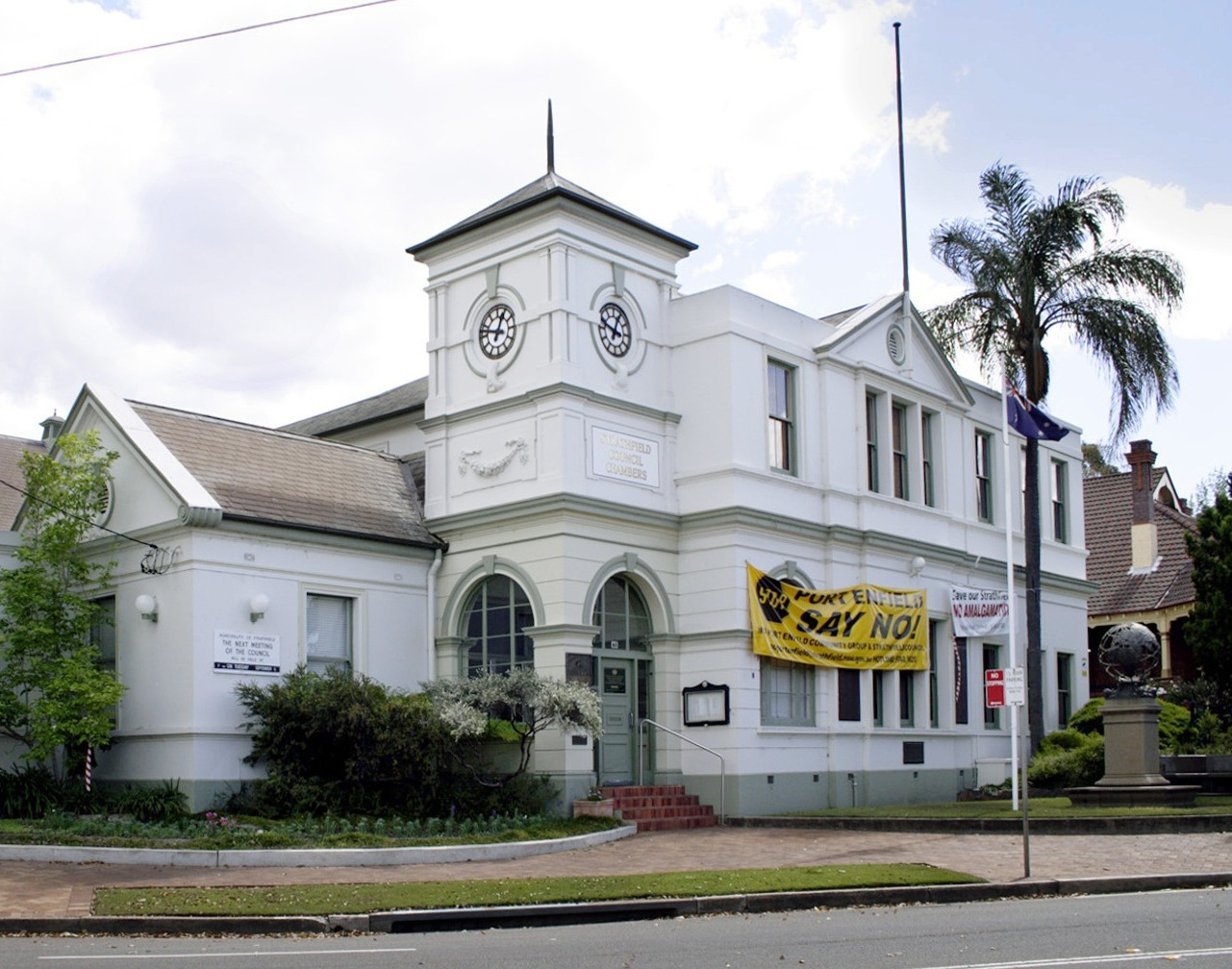
Strathfield Council Chambers with additions by Harry Kent

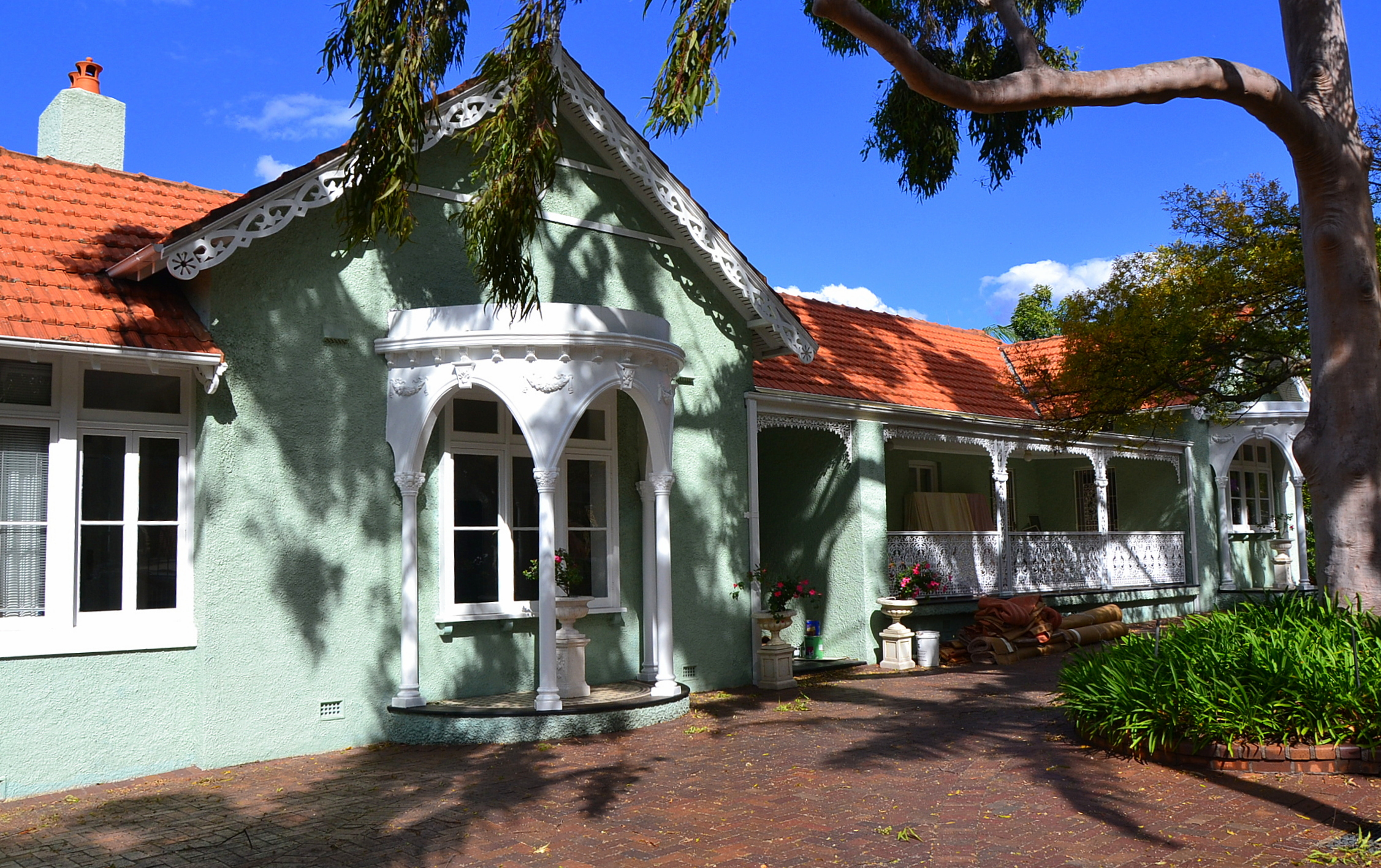
Kelmswood, Kent's home in Redmyre Road, Strathfield

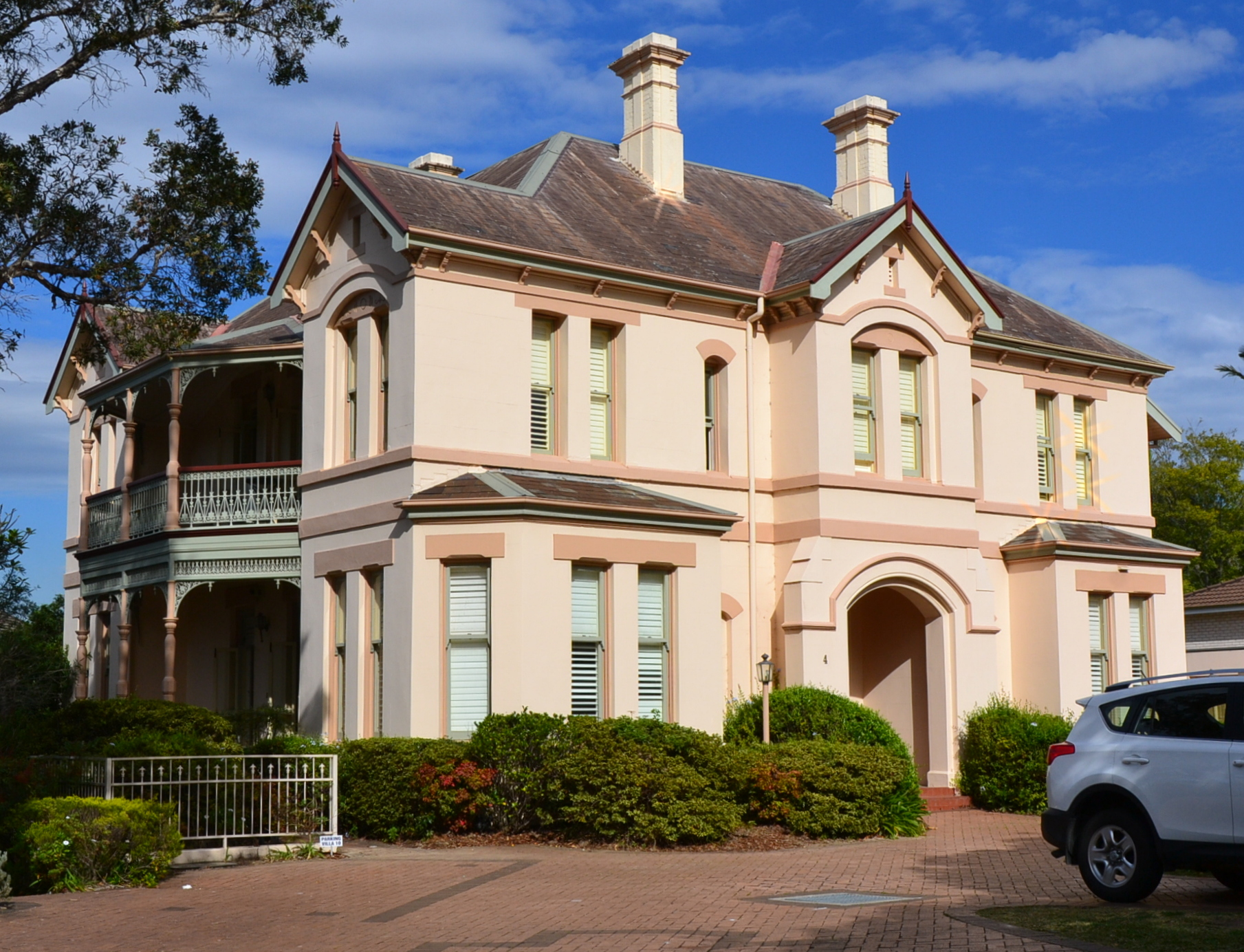
Woodstock, Kent's other home in Redmyre Road, now converted to apartments

Kent was for many years a resident of Strathfield, and designed a number of buildings in the district. These include:

- Mount Royal, Albert Road, 1887, now the Australian Catholic University;
- Agincourt, Albert Road, 1890, now Jesmond Nursing Home
- Institute for Blind Women, Albert Road, 1891, now the Catholic Institute of Sydney;
- Inglenook Margaret Street, 1893 (demolished);
- Swanton Victoria Street, 1914 (demolished);
- Alterations to Strathfield Council Chambers, Homebush Road, 1913;
- First floor extensions to Strathfield Council Chambers, Homebush Road, 1921–23;
- Strathfield Town Hall, Redmyre Road, 1923;

Kent served as an Alderman on Strathfield Council from 1903 until 1905. He designed and built Kelmswood, at 88–94 Redmyre Road in 1893 as his private residence, on the corner of Redmyre Road and Florence Street. Around 1916, Kent moved across the road to 86 Redmyre Road, and called the new house Kelmswood. Kent's original house is now called Woodstock and has been converted to apartments.

== Family ==
In 1886, Kent married Mary Louisa Elbury Jefferis, the daughter of the Reverend James Jefferis of the Pitt Street Congregational Church and Mary Louisa Elbury. They had two daughters, Gladys and Louise (Lulu), and a son, Geoffrey. His brother-in-law Harry Jefferis was articled to him and went on the practice architecture in Western Australia.

== Architecture ==
=== Early work ===
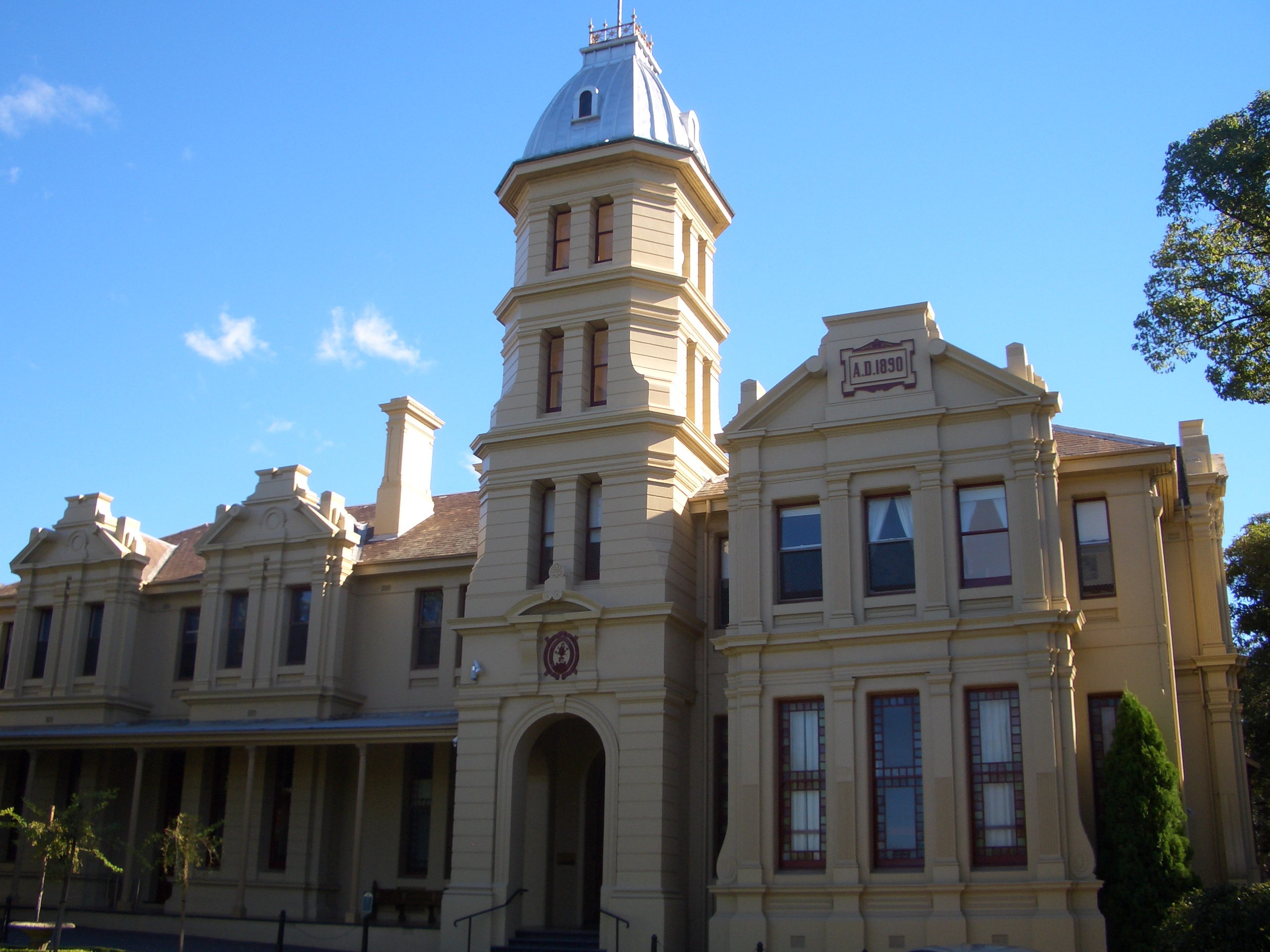
Presbyterian Ladies' College, Croydon

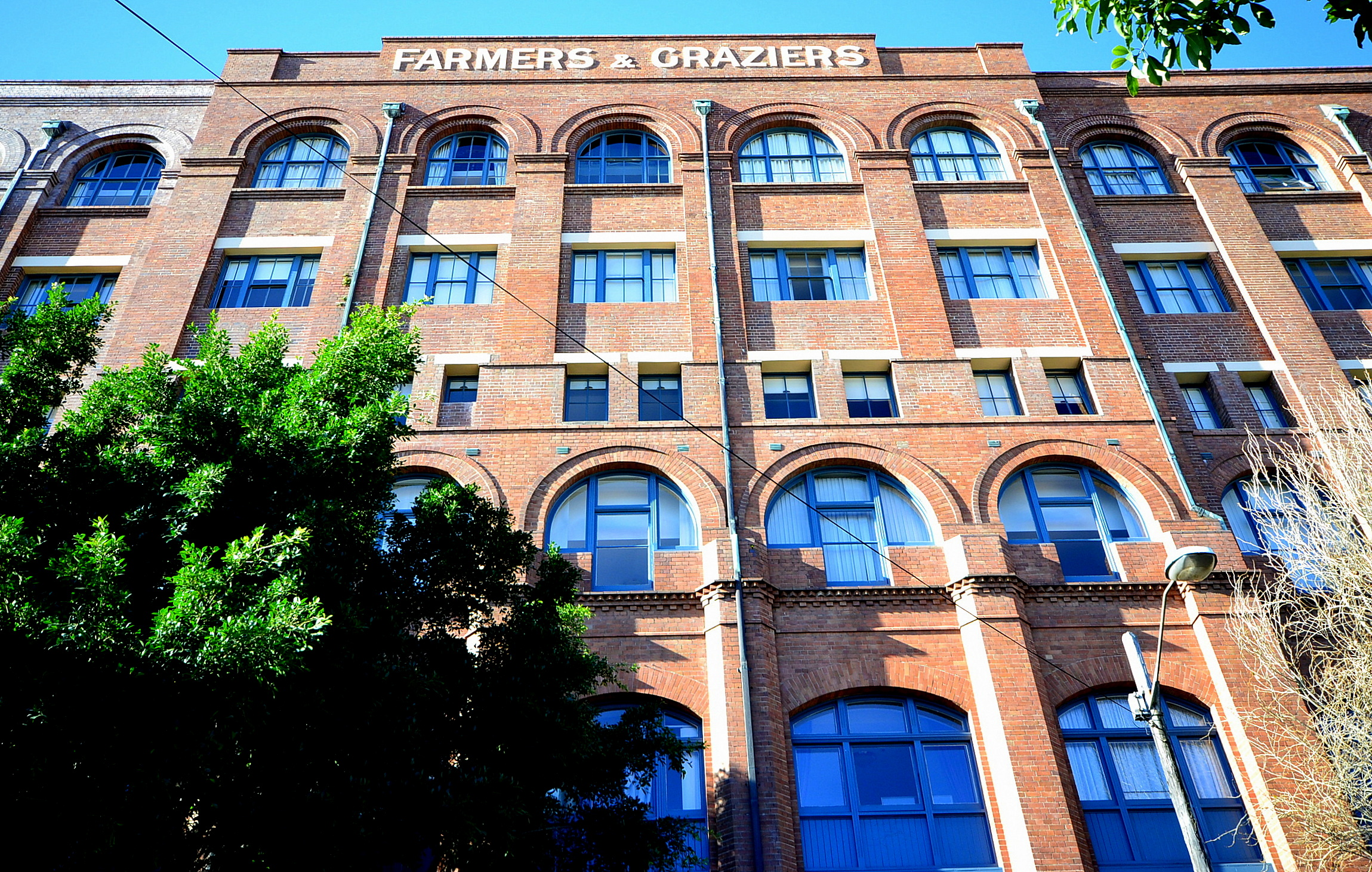
Farmers and Graziers Warehouse, Ultimo

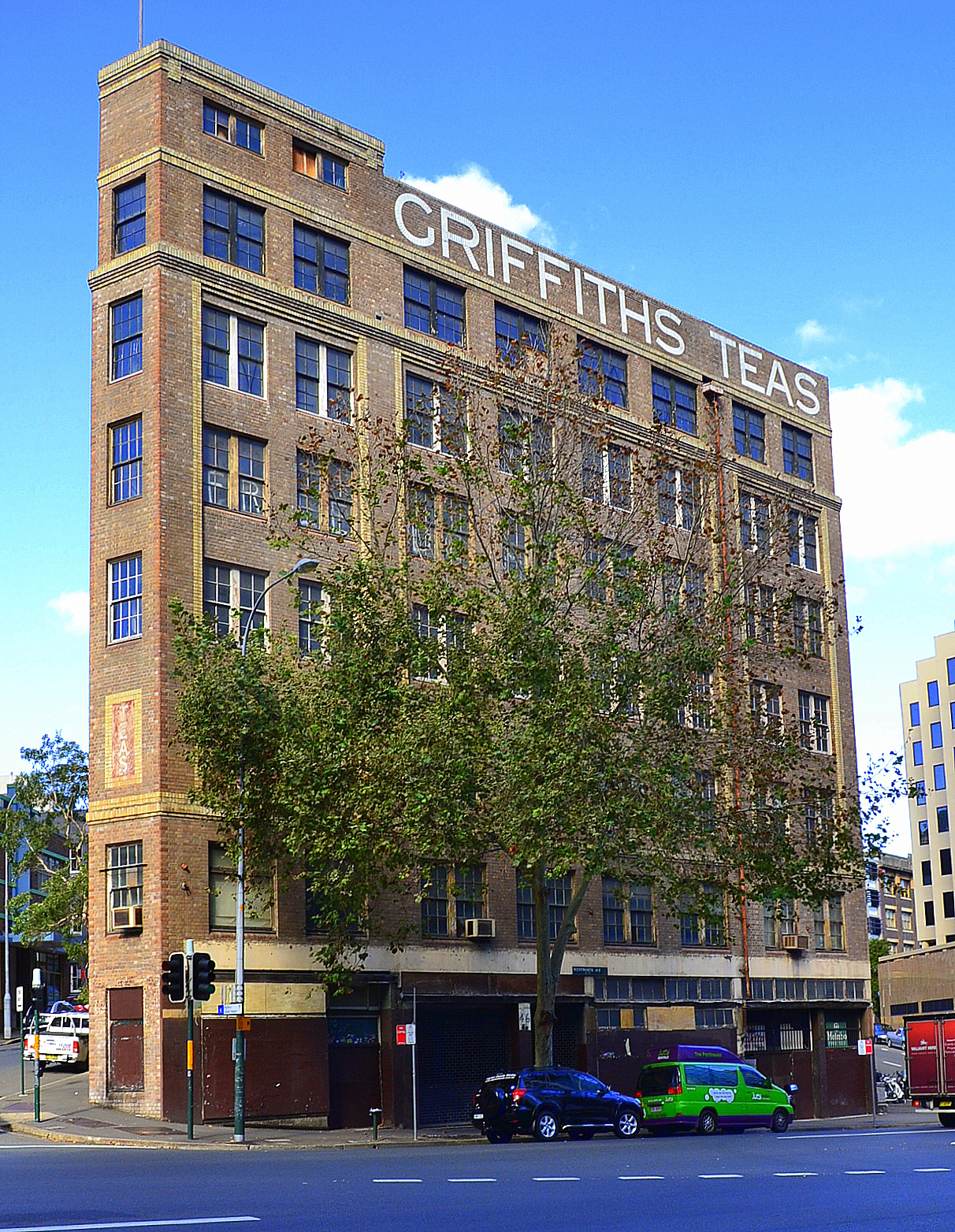
Griffiths Teas, Wentworth Avenue, Surry Hills

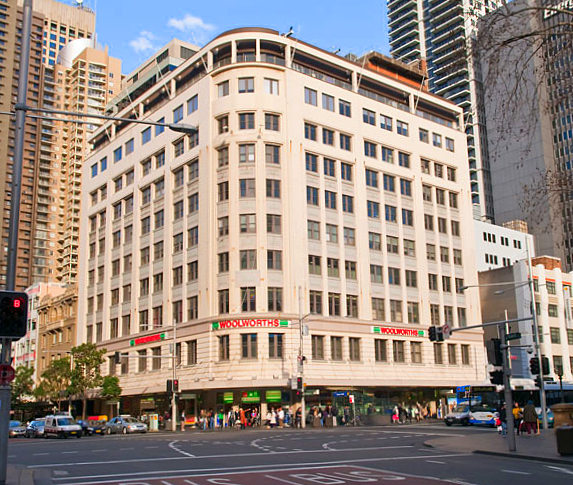
Bebarfalds, now Woolworths corner of George and Park streets, Sydney

When Kent was unable to find employment after graduation from university, he sought advice from John Fairfax. With a recommendation from Fairfax, Kent managed to secure work with master builder John Young. During this time he worked on the construction of the Department of Lands Building, St Mary's Cathedral, Sydney and the Garden Palace that was built for the Sydney International Exhibition of 1879. He went into private practice in 1882 and his first commission was the design of Eldon Chambers in Pitt Street, for Josiah Mullens.

In 1886, Kent designed Caerleon in Bellevue Hill for the Fairfax family, only to have it redesigned by Maurice B. Adams in the Queen Anne style (this made it the first Queen Anne home in Australia). Accepting the inevitable changes, Kent agreed to supervise the construction of his made-over design, but was then outraged when Adams exhibited the design in London as his own work.

In 1890, Kent designed the main school building at the Presbyterian Ladies' College, Sydney. An important early residential design was Lincluden at 12 Fairfax Road, Bellevue Hill, for Sir Thomas Anderson Stuart. The home was constructed 1896–97 and is heritage-listed. In 1895, Kent designed his first major warehouse. The Farmers & Graziers No. 1 Woolstore building is a 3 & 4-storey Federation style warehouse constructed of face brickwork with sandstone detailing and timber windows and doors. It has in recent years been converted into residential apartments.

=== Kent and Budden ===
In 1899, Kent entered into partnership with his former student, Henry Budden and the firm became known as Kent & Budden. Buildings of this partnership include:

- New Zealand Loan and Mercantile Agency Company, wool store, 330 Wattle Street and 89 Jones Street, Ultimo, 1906;
- Cheyne, 21 Redmyre Road, Strathfield 1906;
- Emu Creek, Emu Creek Road, Walcha, 1908;
- Kent House, Liverpool Street, Sydney (1912), now heritage-listed.
- Royal Alexandra Hospital for Children at Camperdown (with Stuart Bros of Annandale)

=== Kent Budden & Greenwell ===
In 1913, Harry Kent and Henry Budden were joined in partnership by Carlyle Greenwell. Greenwell had served his articles with Kent & Budden and after attending Sydney Technical College and the University of Sydney he had completed a Bachelor of Architecture at the University of Pennsylvania. The partnership of Kent Budden & Greenwell was dissolved in 1919, having produced 150 buildings. Budden and Greenwell continued to work in partnership until 1922. Buildings by Kent Budden & Greenwell include:

- Griffith Teas, Wentworth Avenue, Surry Hills in 1915.

=== Kent and Massie ===
Kent and H H Masie became partners in 1919 and practiced together until Kent's retirement in 1930. Massie was a member of an influential banking, commercial and sporting family. Kent & Massie secured many commercial commissions including Bebarfalds, later Woolworths on the corner of George and Park streets, Sydney. Another of their buildings was Pilgrim House, in Pitt Street (1928). It is heritage-listed.

Principal client for Kent and Massie was the Commercial Banking Company of Sydney. Kent & Massie designed the former CBC head office on corner of George and Barrack Streets, Sydney, now heritage-listed, and a series of country banks in Newcastle and Cessnock.

Professional and academic associations
Preceded by Cyril Blacket	President of the Institute of Architects of New South Wales; 1906–1908	Succeeded by Ernest Scott
