= Carlyle Greenwell =

Australian architect

Carlyle Greenwell - Architect
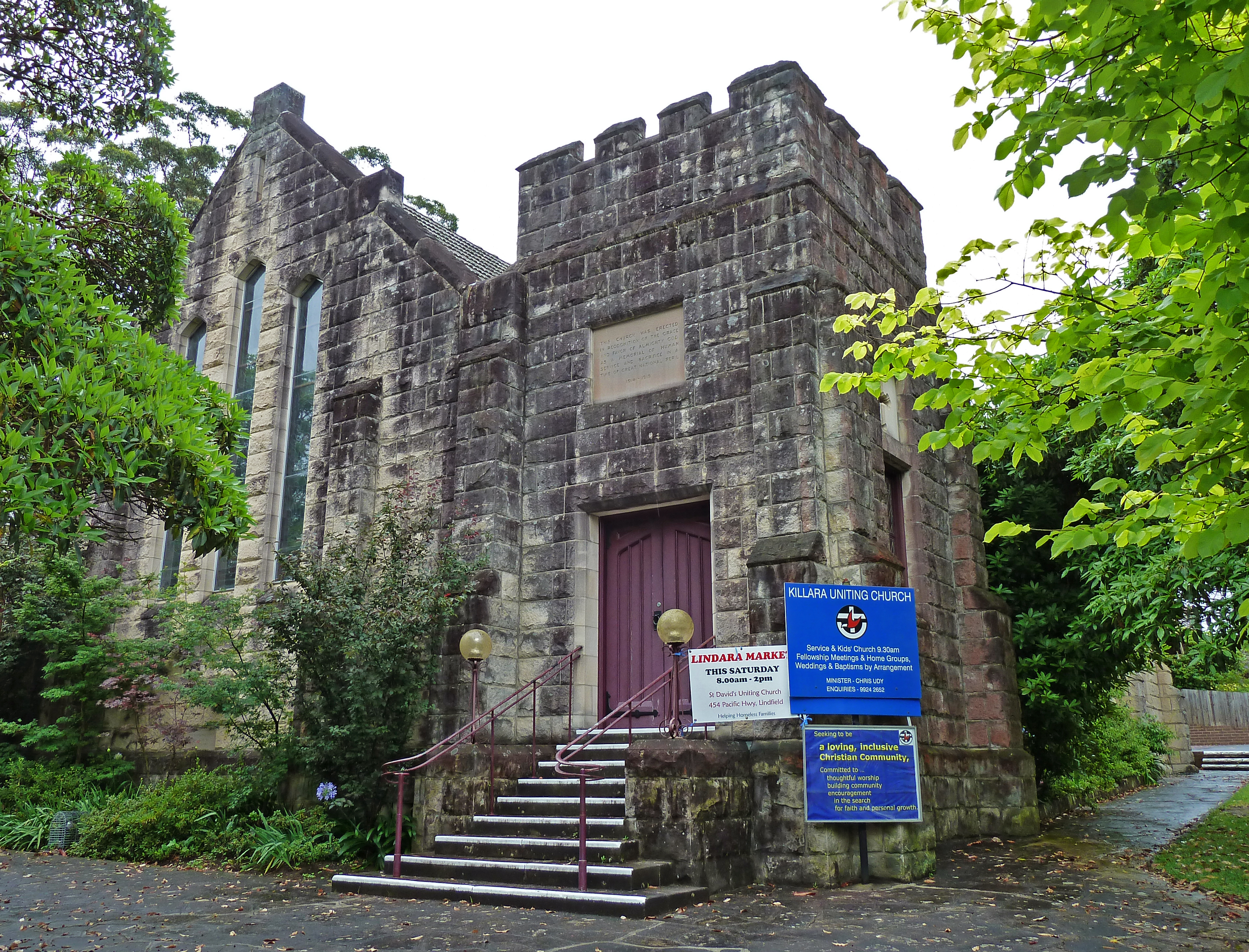
- Uniting Church, Killara, Sydney
- Born: 16 March 1884; Windsor, NSW
- Died: 7 February 1961 (aged 76); Collaroy, NSW
- Occupation: Architect
- Practice: Kent Budden & Greenwell (1912-19); Budden & Greenwell (1919-22); Greenwell & Shirley (1927-35)

Carlyle Greenwell (16 March 1884 – 7 February 1961) was an Australian architect whose houses, designed in the first half of the 20th century, are often heritage-listed. He was also a philanthropist who made bequests to the University of Sydney funding research in Anthropology and Archaeology.

== Early life ==
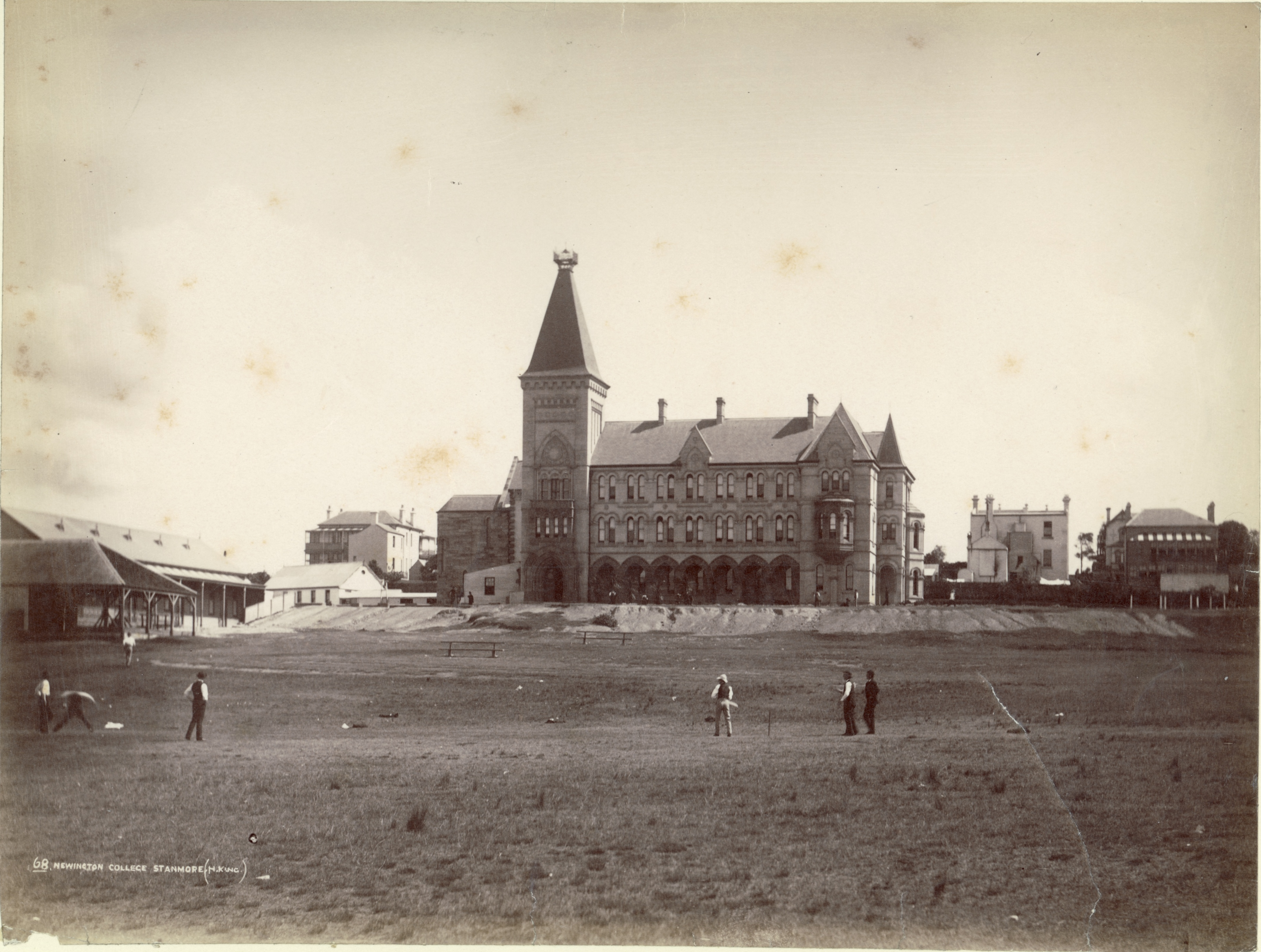
Newington College, Stanmore.

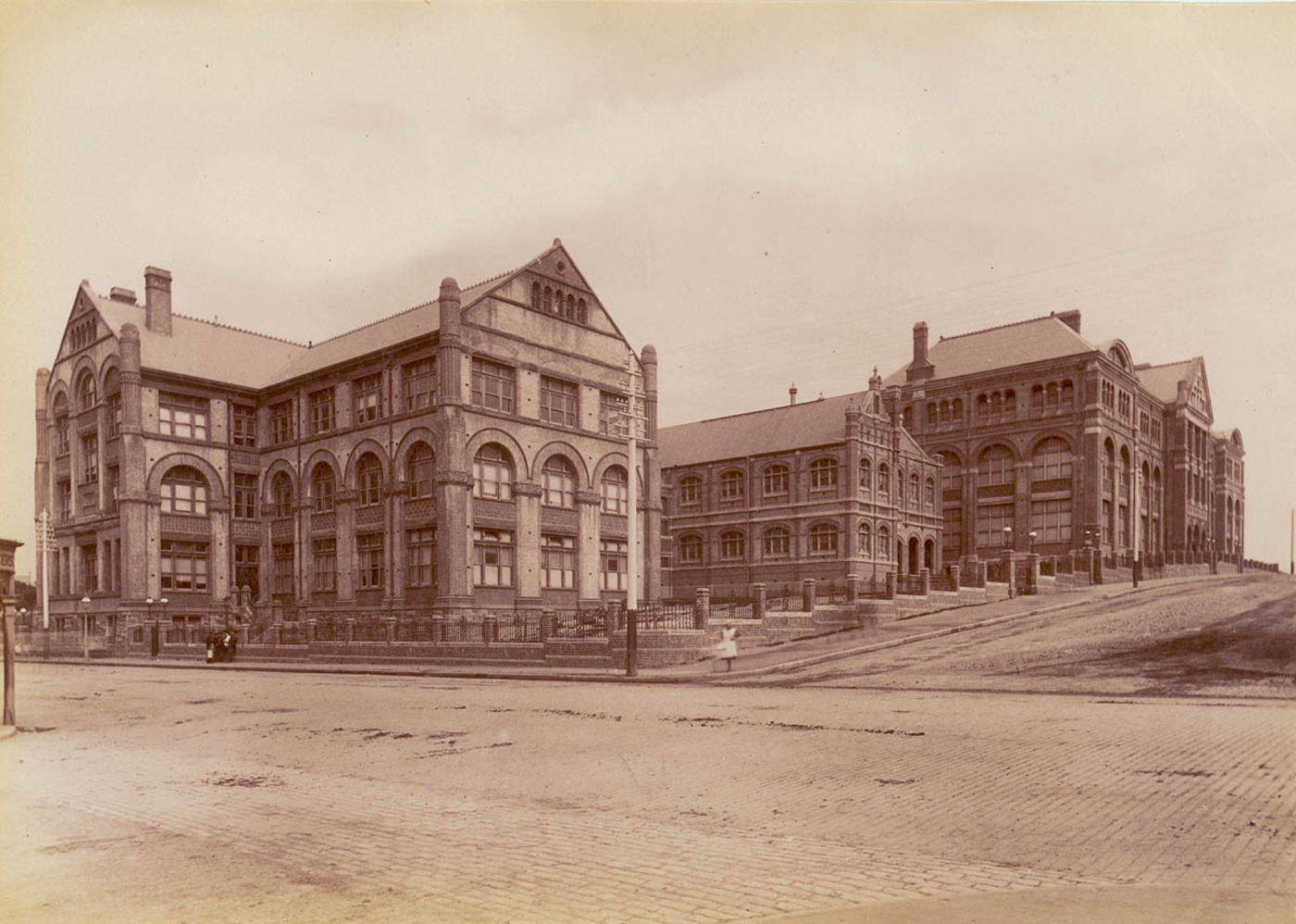
Sydney Technical College, Ultimo.

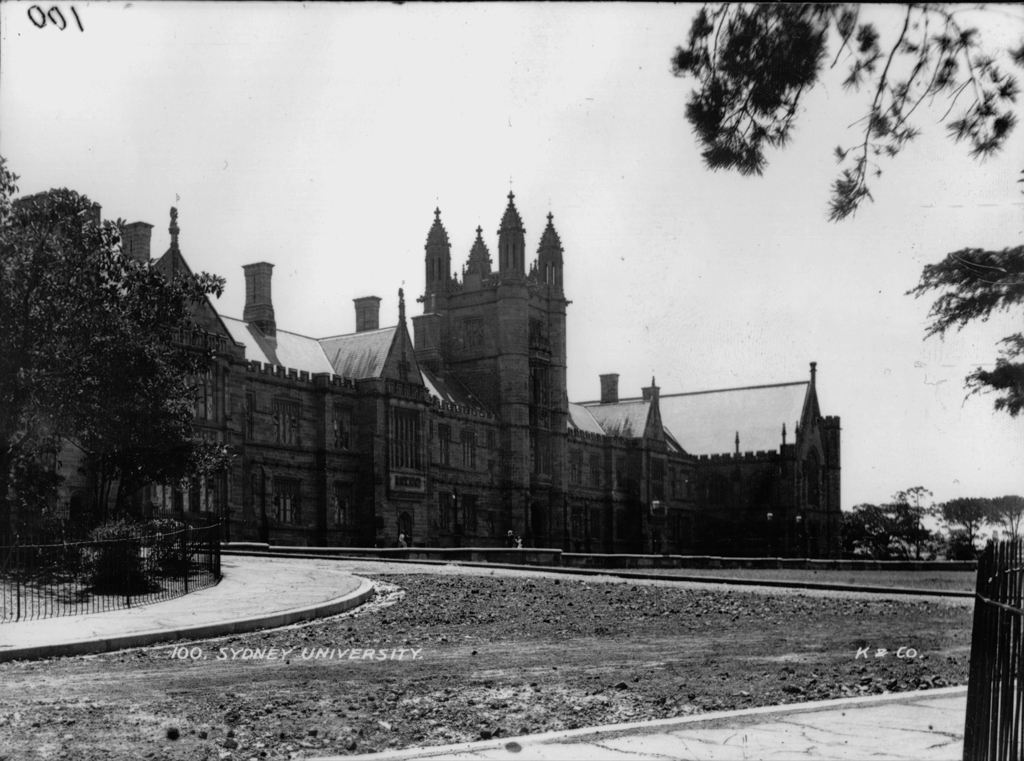
University of Sydney, Camperdown

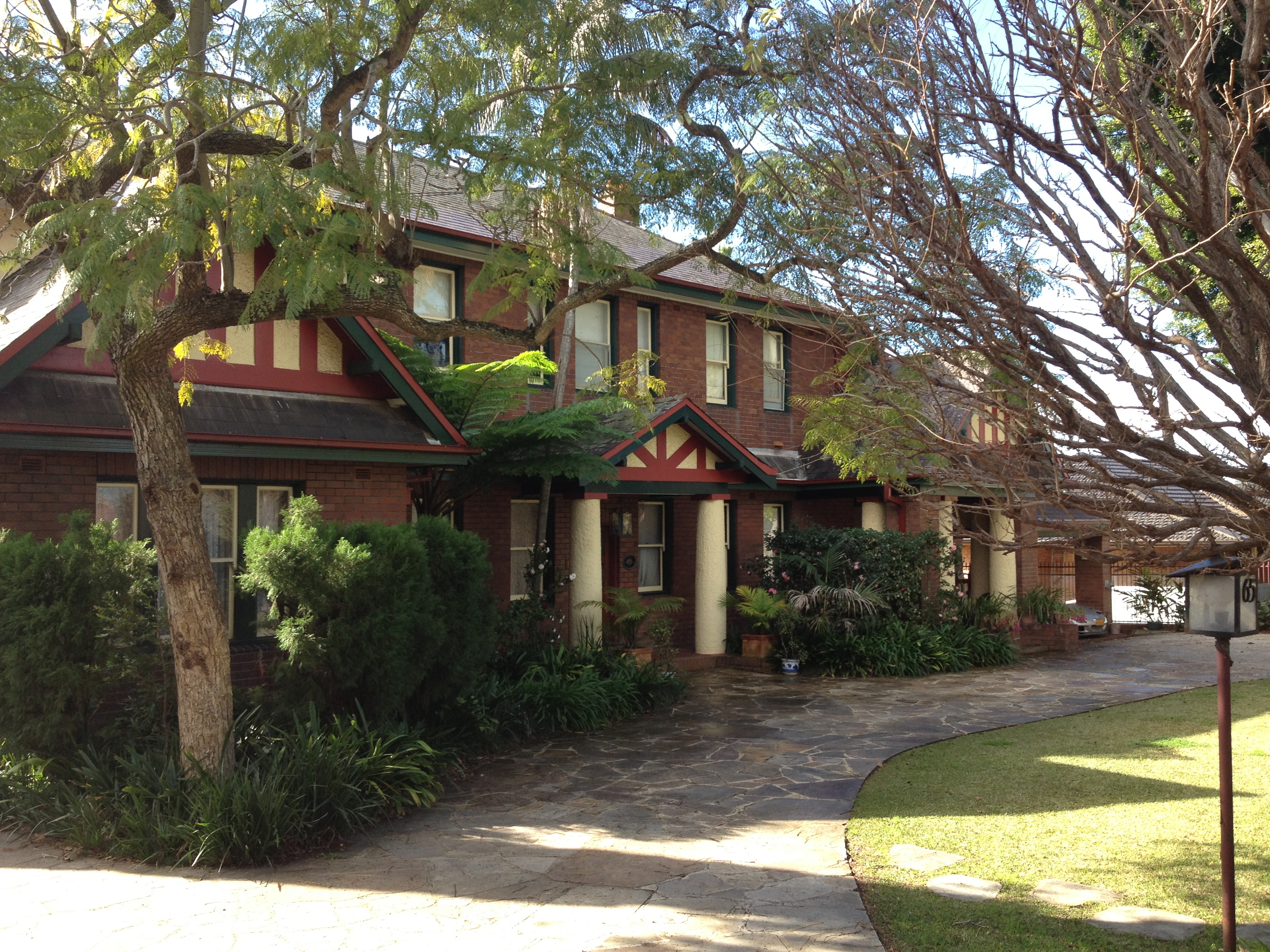
Yeulba 65 Woodside Avenue, Strathfield.

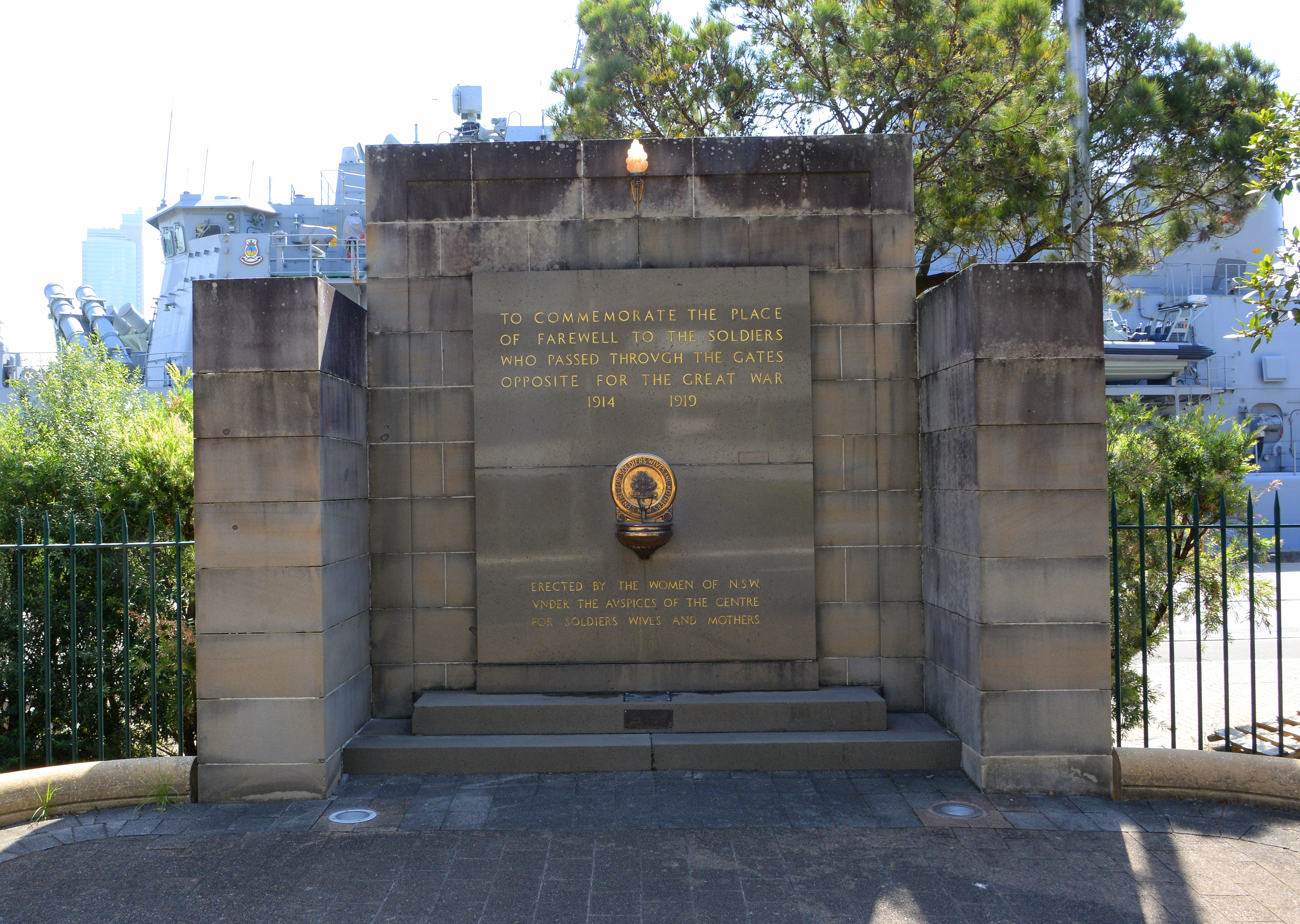
Mothers and Wives First World War Memorial, Woolloomooloo.

Greenwell was born in Windsor, New South Wales, the son of English-born Smith Thomas Greenwell (1831-1913) and Frances Martha Nutter, daughter of Mr Stephen Nutter of Redfern. He was educated at Newington College (1897–1901).

== Architectural career ==
Greenwell studied architecture at Sydney Technical College before there was a university architecture course available in Sydney but also attended architecture lectures in the Engineering Faculty at University of Sydney. In the 1910s Australian and North American architecture became more aligned when the English-born architect and designer James Peddle arrived in Pasadena. He was determined to learn all he could in California by working there. Several Australian architects had already made study trips to the United States before this time and, as John Horbury Hunt’s houses demonstrate, North American architectural trends had had an impact on Australian practice as early as the 1870s. In the 1890s Richardsonian Romanesque, based on an Australian interpretation of Henry Hobson Richardson’s Stick Style and Richardsonian commercial building, had also made a brief splash in Sydney and Melbourne. In the early 1900s, some Australians gained scholarships to attend the School of Architecture at the University of Pennsylvania, then considered “the greatest one of them all” by John Francis Hennessy who attended in 1909 and 1910. Greenwell attended this Philadelphia program at the University of Pennsylvania and was awarded a B.Sc.(Arch) in 1911. Beaux-Arts training was still the main focus of the department’s program. The minutes of the meeting of The Institute of Architects of New South Wales for 1912 records that “We are pleased that Mr. Jack Hennessy and Mr. Carlyle Greenwell have returned and intend to remain among us”. Before studying abroad Greenwell had been articled to the firm of Kent & Budden and in January 1912 he joined them as a partner with the firm becoming Kent Budden & Greenwell One of the earliest works by the new firm was a branch of the Commercial Banking Company of Sydney in the suburb of Crows Nest. The building is still extant on the corner of the Pacific Highway and Shirley Road although it is no longer a bank with a residence above. Early on his impact on Federation era and early Interwar houses can be seen in the Malvern Hill Estate. Malvern Hill is a residential estate with a defined shopping street called The Strand. It was developed from 1909 in Croydon, approximately 10 kilometres from Sydney, and is bounded by Edwin Street, Thomas Street and Walter Street on the east; the railway line, Paisley Road, Reed Street and the rear of properties in Murray Street on the north; the rear of properties on Tahlee Street and David Street on the west; and Liverpool Road on the south. Since 1986 the Malvern Hill Estate has been protected as a conservation area under the Environmental Planning and Assessment Act of NSW. The residential and retail precincts of the estate represent an almost intact example of the town planning and architectural trends of the early twentieth century. The Strand shopping strip, which was developed between 1913 and 1920, was a dominant feature of the new model suburb of Malvern Hill and contributes greatly to the federation character of the area. It was designed to provide a broad and elegant transition between the railway station at Croydon and the salubrious residential streets of Malvern Hill. 15 Malvern Avenue was designed by Kent, Budden & Greenwell for geologist and educator Adolph Carl von de Heyde Süssmilch (1875-1946) in 1912, making it one of the earliest Californian Bungalows built in Sydney. It was occupied for about 25 years by Sir Bertram Stevens, who lived there while he was Premier of NSW. Greenwell was the project architect for two other houses on the estate: 32 Malvern Crescent, and Toorak at 29 Chelmsford Avenue both showing his distinctive rough-cast stucco columns. During this time, Greenwell designed a number of substantial homes for family and friends in Strathfield, Killara and Vaucluse. Designs in these suburbs include Milverton on The Boulevarde and Yeulba at 65 Woodside Avenue, Strathfield. They are characteristic of his work in this period and still largely intact. Milverton is now part of the campus of Trinity Prep. Other notable designs showing his trademark rough-cast stucco columns are Wilgunyah at 30 Roberts Street, Strathfield, and Terhyn Worthle at 1 Locksley Street, Killara. In 2022 Wilgunyah was altered but its columns remain. In 2012 Terhyn Worthle was substantially demolished. One of the local council’s requirements of the new dwelling was to retain the six large columns at the front. After the heritage delisting by Ku-ring-gai Council of Wintergarden, a five-bedroom home built in 1913 at 21 Lorne Avenue Killara for his brother, this building was demolished in 2015. Other houses by Greenwell at 8 Nyora Street and 5 Locksley Street Killara still stand in 2023. Inversnaid in Gilliver Avenue Vaucluse was built in 1914 but has since been demolished. Chessetwood in Martin Road in the suburb of Centennial Park is another home designed in 1914 by the partnership of Kent Budden & Greenwell with Greenwell as the project architect evidenced by the colonnade of rough-cast stucco columns. After the departure of Harry Kent, the firm became known as Budden & Greenwell. In this period, Greenwell designed the Inter-War Gothic-styled Killara Congregational Church, which later became the Killara Uniting Church and the Harrison House in Toowoomba. In this partnership Greenwell was involved in the design of two important works for women in the community. The Woolloomooloo Bay Mothers and Wives Memorial to Solders in Woolloomooloo and The Women’s Club. A club for professional women in Sydney had been established 1901. New club premises were opened in 1924 at Beaumont House in Elizabeth Street, Sydney, at a total cost £31,635/10/2. by the firm. In 1926 a department store Murrays Limited was designed by Greenwell and his newly graduated architectural assistant Malcom Moir. In 2023 the building still stands in Church and Macquarie Streets in Centenary Square in Parramatta as office accommodation and individual shops. Moir worked for Greenwell in 1925 and 1926. Another design in this era was for the station managers home at Tarwyn Park Rylstone. This historic horse breeding stud and its rustic style homestead in roughly hewn stone and roofed in corrugated iron still stands but is under threat from the Bylong Coal project. Manufacturer and businessmen Sir Clifton Love was a prominent member of the Congregational Church. In 1922 he commissioned Budden & Greenwell to design a house Dunaird at 1 Shirley Road, Wollstowcraft. In 1923 his son commissioned Greenwell and Shirley to design Oweenee across the road at 3 Milray Avenue Wollstonecraft. In 1929 Greenwell designed Laanecorrie in the Inter War Classical Revival style at 133 Jannali Avenue Sutherland for his cousin George Malcolm Greenwell. Sections of the building remain as part of the Lark Ellen Nursing Home. In 1931, while still in partnership with John K. Shirley, Greenwell designed the Norman House at 79 Vaucluse Road, Vaucluse in an Inter War Georgian/Mediterranean revival style. In 1933 Greenwell and Shirley designed another Georgian/Mediterranean style revival home at 16 Khartoum Avenue, Gordon that still stands in 2024. In 1935 Greenwell and Shirley designed a brick and tile symmetrical single storey bungalow with white columns and white shutters at 110 Albert Road Strathfield that is still extant. In the same year the firm designed a Congregational Church in Gordon which is the last known design attributed to the firm. Shirley was an Anglican so as a communicant member of the Congregational Church Greenwell was the principal architect of the building. The exterior walls were cemented and bagged, coloured in cream, and connected with the existing Manse by a series of arches. The Church and alterations were carried out in Southern Italian architectural style. The cream walls were relieved by the tiled cappings to the buttresses, and by the greens, creams and bright browns of the woodwork. The Church had seating accommodation for 220 persons, 160 in the main portion and 60 in the transcripts. The arches with twisted columns surmount the dais, in which the pulpit and reading desk stands with a communion table, on to which the light from two hidden amber windows streams. A feature of the building is the windows which are carried out in amber-coloured leadlight. After Church Union the building became part of The Uniting Church in Australia. In 1985, due to a dwindling congregation, it was decided to close the church. It was offered to the Baptist Church which had been looking for new premises. After major alterations it re-opened as the Gordon Baptist Church in February 1988.

== Personal life ==
At the age of 53, Greenwell married Sibyl Enid Vera Munro Morrison, a divorcee who was the first female practising barrister in New South Wales, at St Stephen's Presbyterian Church on 16 March 1937.

== War service ==
Greenwell served as an Army Officer in both World War I and World War II.

== Legacy ==
Greenwell died at Collaroy, New South Wales, on 7 February 1961. His estate funded the Carlyle Greenwell Research Fund at Sydney University for student research, field work and original literary work in Anthropology. A substantial bequest to the Art Gallery of NSW included works by George Lambert, Sydney Long, Kenneth McQueen and John Passmore. Over many years he was also a major donor to the Australian Museum.
