= Maclurcan =

Maclurcan is a surname. Notable people with the surname include:

- Donald Charles Boulton Maclurcan (1918–1999), Australian architect
- Hannah Maclurcan (1860–1936), Australian cook and hotelier
- James Maclurcan (born 1985), Australian actor and model
