= Chatswood South Uniting Church =

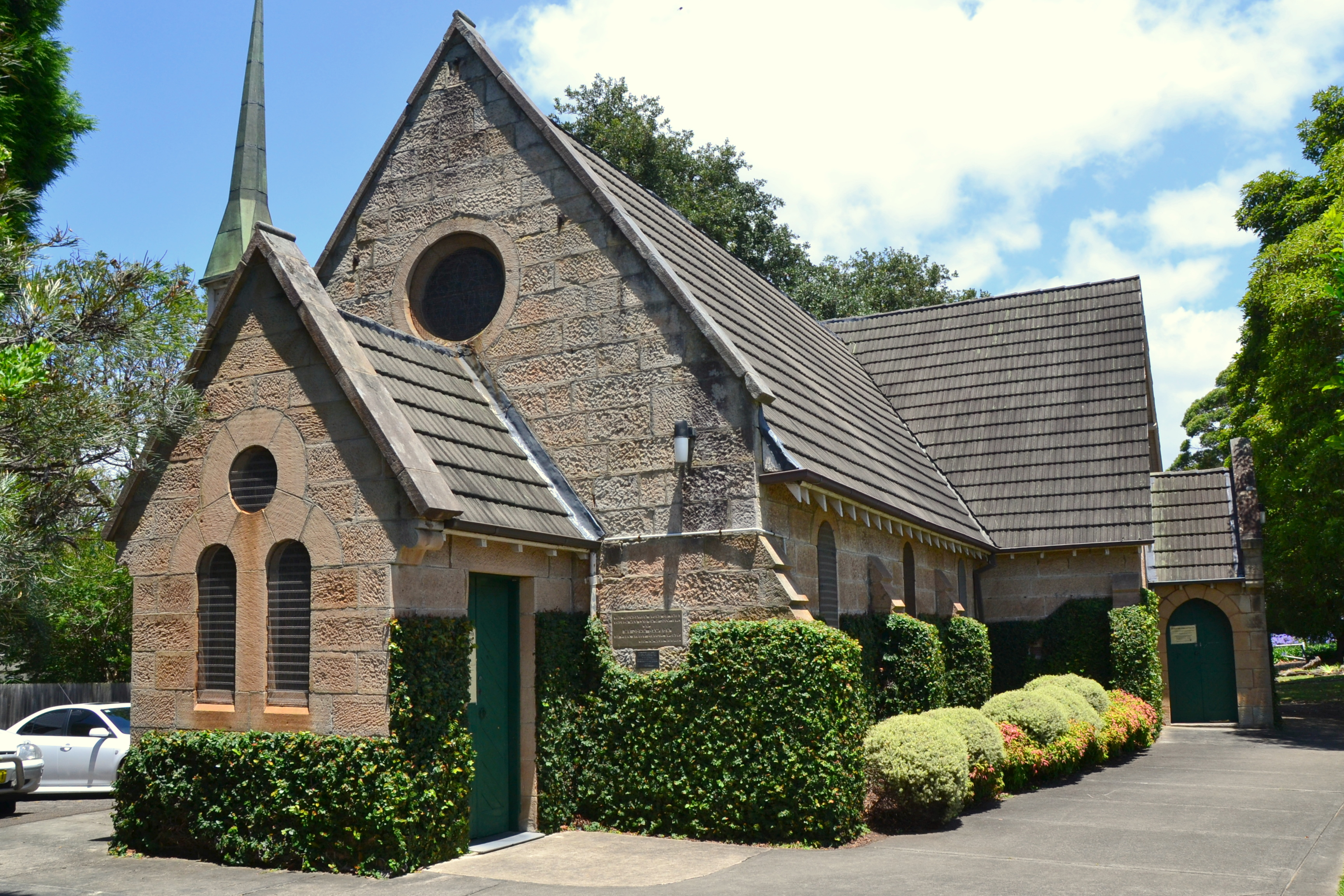
- Front view of church

- Location of Chatswood South Uniting Church in Greater Sydney
- 33°48′21″S 151°10′43″E
- Location: 518 Pacific Highway, Lane Cove North, Sydney
- Country: Australia
- Denomination: Uniting
- Previous denomination: Wesleyan Methodist Church of Australia

History
- Status: Church
- Founded: 1 July 1871
- Founder: John Dawson

Architecture
- Functional status: Active
- Architects: Thomas Rowe; possibly also Mr Morrow; Hedley Carr
- Architectural type: Victorian Gothic
- Years built: 1871-1968

Specifications
- Materials: Sydney sandstone; Slate roof

New South Wales Heritage Register
- Official name: Chatswood South Uniting Church and Cemetery; Chatswood South Methodist Church
- Type: State heritage (complex / group)
- Designated: 2 April 1999
- Reference no.: 694
- Type: Church
- Category: Religion
- Builders: Bryson, Leet, Johnson & Montgomery

The Chatswood South Uniting Church is a heritage-listed Uniting church at 518 Pacific Highway, Lane Cove North, Sydney, Australia. It was designed by Thomas Rowe and possibly a Mr Morrow also and built by Bryson, Leet, Johnson & Montgomery. It is also known as Chatswood South Uniting Church and Cemetery and Chatswood South Methodist Church. It was added to the New South Wales State Heritage Register on 2 April 1999. The property was sold in 2017 for redevelopment.

== History ==
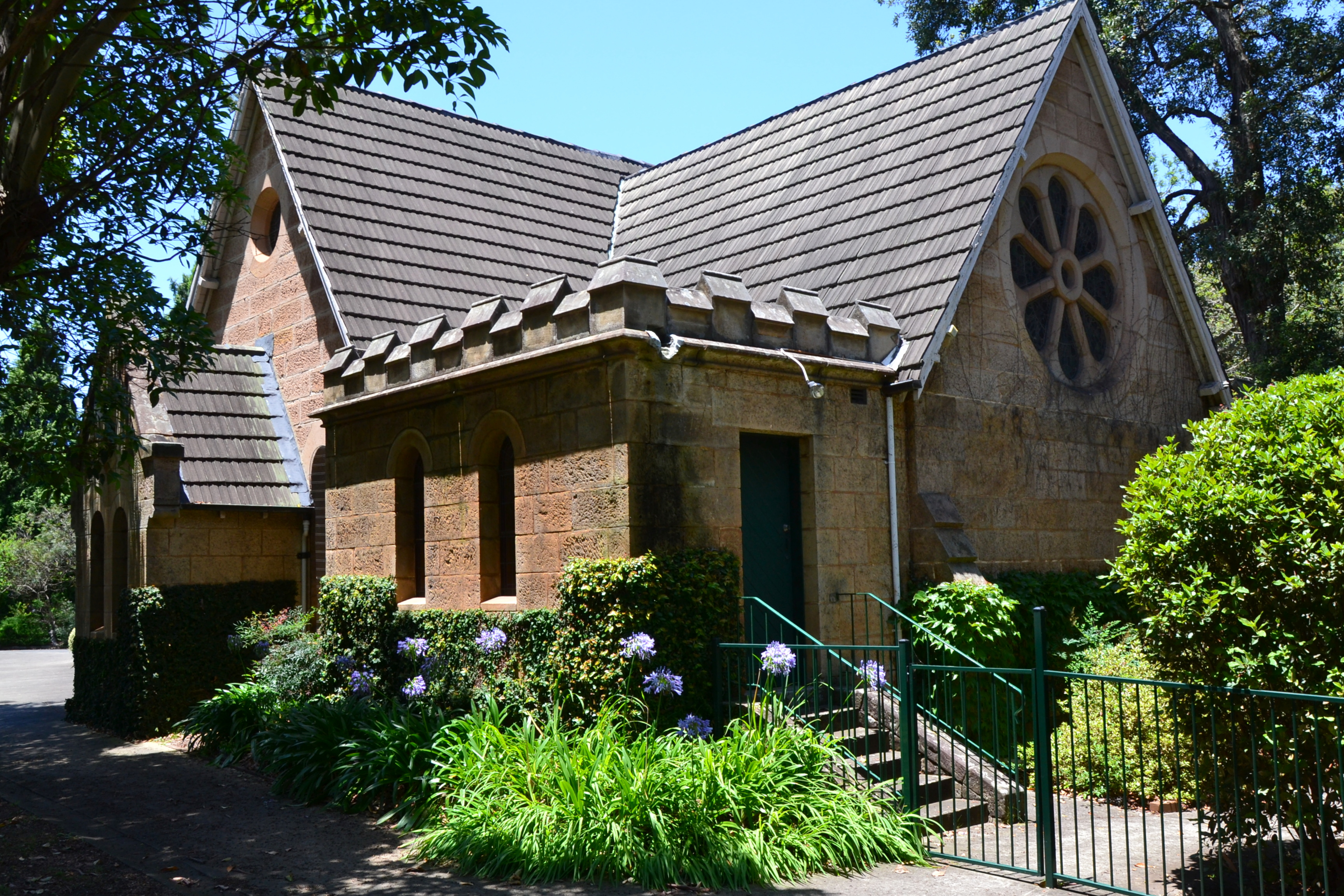
Rear view

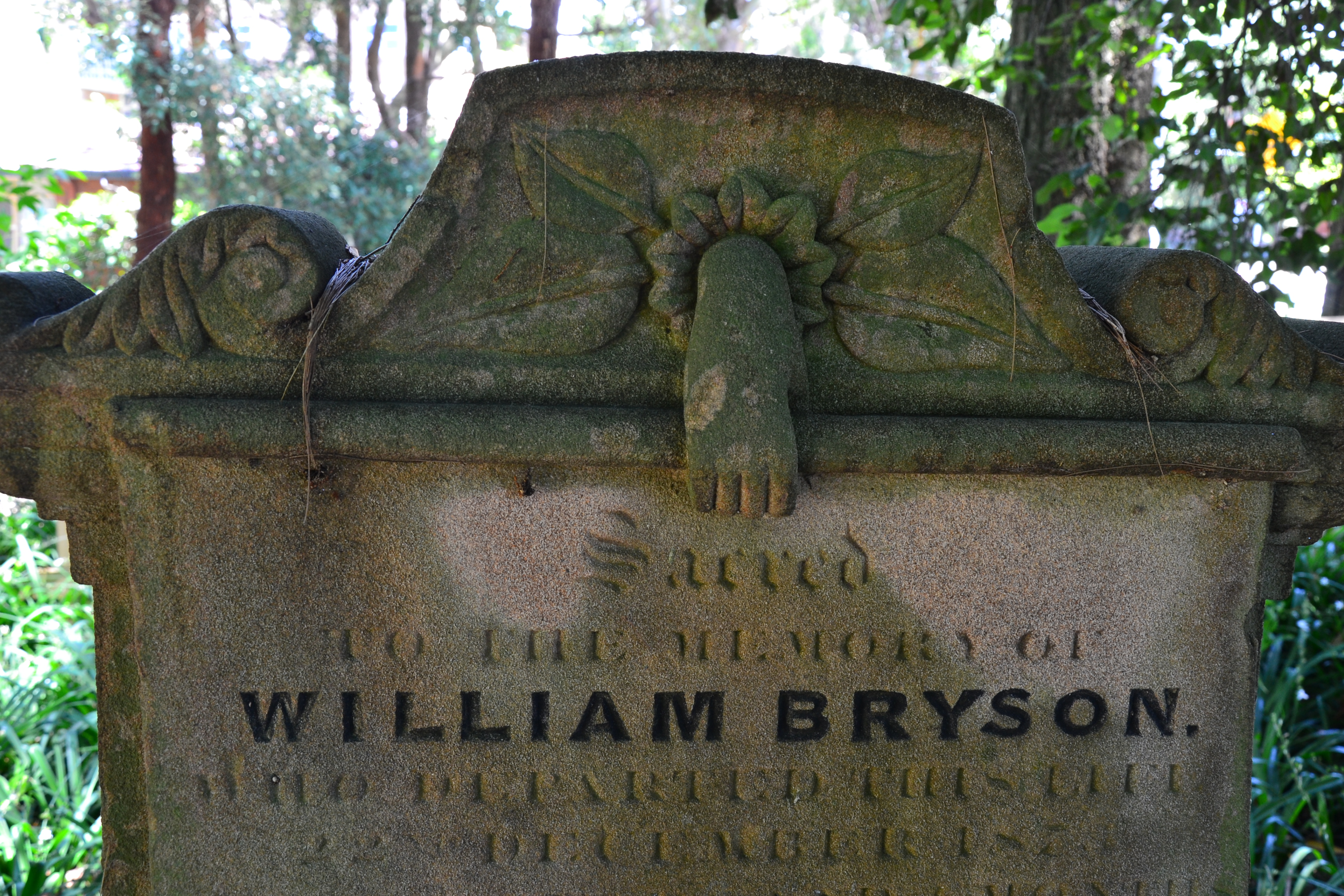
Bryson grave

The remaining Crown land in this area was auctioned in the 1850s, marketed as an area for fruit growing and farming. The land on which the church sits was originally owned by James Mitchell, after whom the Mitchell Library in Sydney is named. Upon his death the land passed to his son, David Scott Mitchell, a medical doctor. In 1871, zero point eight one hectares (two acres) of this land was then purchased from David Mitchell by the trustees of the Wesleyan church, William Henry McKeown and others.

Methodist services in the Artarmon area were originally conducted in the home of Mr. and Mrs. John Bryson, who lived opposite the present site of the church, at the corner of the Pacific Highway and Mowbray Road. In 1843, Wesleyan Methodist local preachers visited Lane Cove (then all North Shore) and formed a class of 12 people. In 1871 the local Methodists settled purchase of the church's land (opposite), although the sandstone church had been recently built at this time.

The church was the third Methodist church to be built on the north shore. It is the earliest remaining. The architect is likely to have been Thomas Rowe, although it is much simpler than many other of his designs for this period. It had a timber shingle roof and cedar lining. Mr Morrow drew the plans for the building which was to be a stone structure. Stone was cut and carted to the site and timbers were hauled from the upper North Shore. The builders were Bryson, Leet, Johnson and Montgomery, who were all members of the congregation. James Montgomery was the stonemason for the church. On 1 July 1871, John Dawson, a prominent business man attached to the York Street Methodist Church, laid the Foundation Stone and the church was opened on 31 December 1871.

The church was built in 1871 after being designed by Thomas Rowe. The church was designed in Gothic Revival style, as was usually the case with ecclesiastical buildings of that period. One of its distinctive features was a small belfry on the east side of the building. Changes and additions were carried out in 1883 and 1930. The church has a national heritage listing.

The Christian Advocate of 1 August 1871 noted that:

"The church when finished will be a very neat and substantial structure. The site it occupies is on the Lane Cove Road, close to the junction of the North Sydney road, and is about four miles from the township of St Leonards. The building is being constructed of stone and will be roofed with pointed shingles. The roof will be lined with cedar. Ample provision has been made for light and ventilation. The church is being built on a portion of ground of two acres extent. Part of this land is intended for a cemetery. Mr Thomas Rowe is the architect and Mr Jago of North Sydney the contractor for the stonework."

Another ceremony was held on 7 October 1883 when the transept and porch were added which meant that the space had more than doubled to a cruciform plan. In 1891 the name of the church changed from Willoughby to Chatswood.

The Sunday School was built and opened in 1906. A tennis club was formed after courts were built in the south-western corner of the grounds in 1912. A second tennis court was paved in bitumen for use as a car park - year unknown. A kindergarten hall was built in 1912, but burnt down in the 1960s and was rebuilt in 1967. The primary hall was built in 1913. In 1930 the sanctuary, two vestries and a porch were added. In 1935 a new organ was installed and in 1937 the parsonage was built, designed by the architect Hedley Norman Carr.

In 1966 a bronze bell was installed in the tower. The fellowship centre was constructed in 1968 in honey-coloured brick. In 1977, the Wesleyan Methodist Church of Australia agreed to join the newly created Uniting Church of Australia and after 106 years as a Methodist church, this church became the Chatswood South Uniting Church. On 4 July 1971 Sir Roden Cutler, Governor of NSW and his wife unveiled a plaque here on the Centenary celebrations of Chatswood South Uniting Church.

On the east side of the church is a small cemetery that was established in the early 1870s. The first person buried there was the infant Mary Elizabeth Holland. It is one of only two surviving churchyard cemeteries on Sydney's north shore. It was closed in 1924 and afterwards suffered considerably from vandalism. The cemetery was owned and maintained by the parish from its consecration in 1871 until it was handed over to Lane Cove Council in the early 1980s. It was classified by the National Trust of Australia (NSW) in 1976 along with the gardens. In 1984 the cemetery was rededicated a Pioneers' Memorial Reserve. One feature of the cemetery is the camellia tree growing in the north-west corner. The story behind this tree is that in 1878 a young man by the name of Hugh Bryson was riding to Willoughby to visit his fiancée. Unfortunately, his horse shied and he was thrown to the ground and killed. In his button-hole was a camellia, which was taken by his fiancée. At his funeral, she planted the camellia in the soil over his grave and it took root, resulting in the tree that can still be seen growing alongside the Bryson graves.

== Description ==
Site

The site is on a corner of a busy intersection with the Pacific Highway. The 0.8-hectare (2.0-acre) site slopes down gently from east to west and contains a scattering of large turpentine trees, possibly remnant specimens. The property boundary has been intact since purchase in 1871. A small sandstone church in simple Victorian Gothic style occupies the north-east corner of the site. A 1960s fellowship centre lies further west, adjacent to the Sunday school. A cemetery lies to the north-west. The south-west is used as a car park shaded by trees; the south-east contains the parsonage.

A small graveyard lies to the west of the church, with burials dating from eighteen seventy one to nineteen twenty four, with the majority being before nineteen ten. Most monuments are of sandstone or marble and simple in design. The cemetery is not enclosed.

In the south west corner of the site are tennis courts.

A well kept garden surrounds the buildings, with mature trees including eucalypts, privet (Ligustrum sp.), sweet pittosporum (P.undulatum), jacaranda (J.mimosaefolia), turpentines (Syncarpia glomulifera), funeral cypress (Cupressus funebris), four large camphor laurels (Cinnamomum camphora) (three east of church, one west of fellowship centre), and in the east facing the Pacific Highway are two Norfolk Island pines (Araucaria excelsa) and a Canary Island date palm (Phoenix canariensis). Four brush box trees (Lophostemon confertus) line the northern side of Mowbray Road. Shrubs include oleanders (Nerium oleander), camellias (Camellia sp.) and the church walls are covered with dwarf creeping fig (Ficus pumila var. pumila).

Church

Gothic style sandstone church with tiled roof, built in the eighteen seventies. East front flanked by a tiny belfry with a bell from the NSW Fire Brigade. The interior walls are rendered and most windows contain stained glass. The roof is lined between the timber trusses. Pews are probably original. The original architect was Thomas Rowe, although there is reference to Morrow drawing the plans. The stonework contractor was Jago. The builders were Bryson, Leet, Johnson & Montgomery, all members of the early congregation.

Other buildings

Other buildings on site are a parsonage to the south, fellowship centre (twentieth century) to the south and west of the church, hall (twentieth century) west of that.

=== Condition ===
As at 19 January 2004, vandalism of the cemetery has been extreme. Of about 65 grave sites evident in nineteen eighty only about four have undamaged monuments. Most are repairable.

The site has limited potential to yield in situ archaeological material as a result of development process that are likely to have disturbed or removed archaeological remains. There is greater potential to recover remains in the south-eastern portion of the site. The heritage significance of these remains was found by Anna London to be of moderate to high local significance.

=== Modifications and dates ===
- 1883 – a transept and porch were added
- 1930 – sanctuary and two vestries were added, A. W. Anderson, architect
- 1935 – pipe organ installed. Tile roof has replaced original shingles.

== Heritage listing ==
This church group is of historic, aesthetic and social significance as a fine, intact rural church, graveyard and landscaped grounds indicative of the early rural settlement of Lane Cove in the eighteen seventies. It is the oldest remaining (the third built) Methodist church on Sydney's North Shore, and the first church to be built in Lane Cove. The graveyard contains the remains of early pioneer families such as the Forsythe, Bryson and French families. It is also of aesthetic significance as a landmark on the Pacific Highway.

Chatswood South Uniting Church was listed on the New South Wales State Heritage Register on 2 April 1999.

== Redevelopment ==
The church property was sold in July 2018 for $17.41936m. A Development Application was submitted for 40 home units but was later withdrawn.

== See also ==
- Wesleyan Methodist Church of Australia
