= QT Hotels & Resorts =

- Trade name: QT Hotels & Resorts
- Type: Subsidiary
- Industry: Hospitality
- Founded: 2011; 15 years ago
- Headquarters: Sydney, Australia
- Number of locations: 11
- Products: Hotels
- Parent: Event Hospitality and Entertainment
- Website: qthotels.com

QT Hotels & Resorts, or QT, is a boutique hotel accommodation and hospitality provider that operates in Australia and New Zealand. Established in 2011, the brand currently operates eleven hotels in three countries.

== History ==
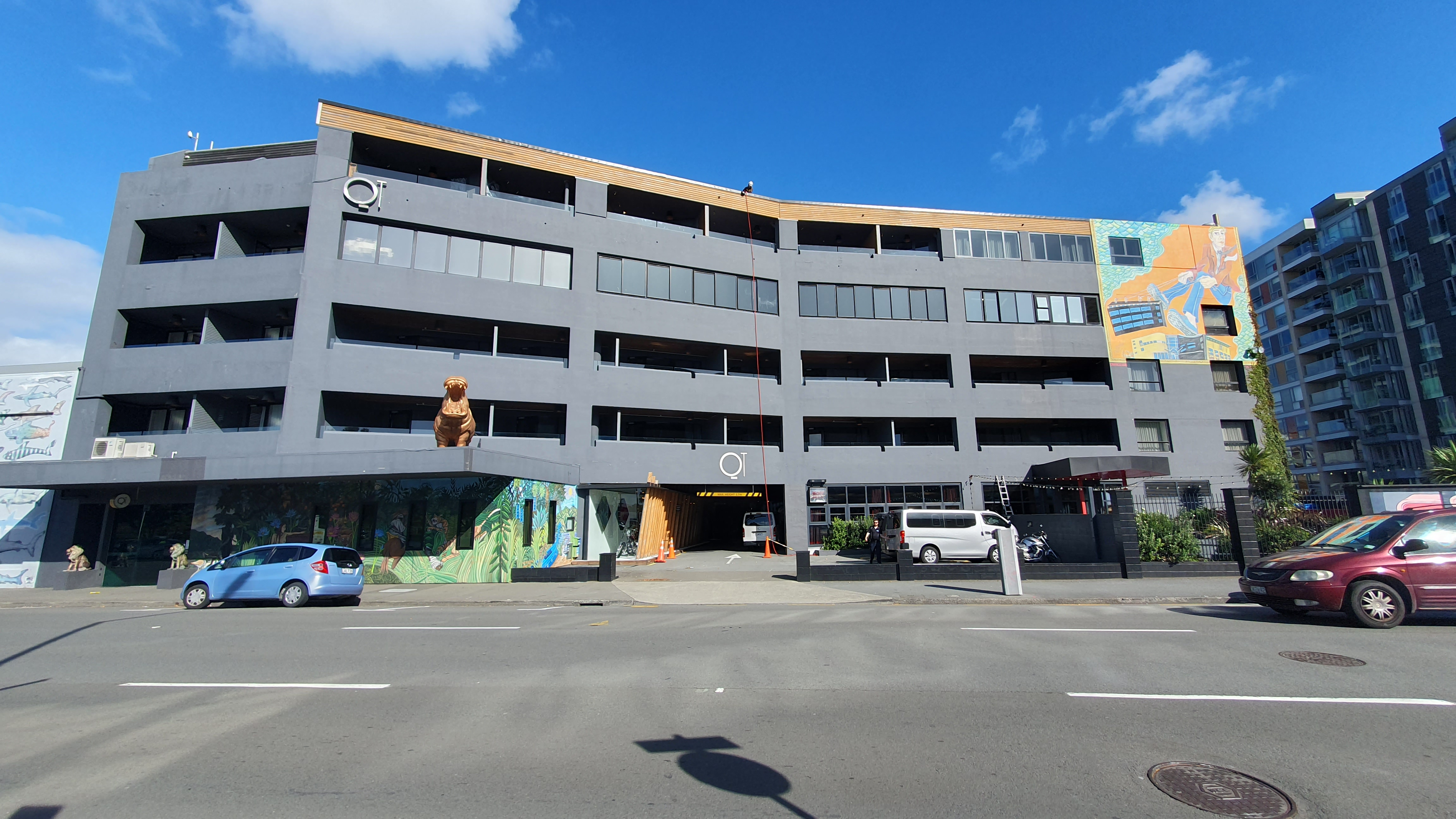
QT Hotel in Wellington

The brand was established in 2011, with its first hotel QT Gold Coast. QT is a subsidiary of the ASX-listed EVT Limited, a corporation that owns and operates brands in the entertainment, hospitality and leisure sectors, mainly within Australasia. The flagship location, QT Canberra operates inside a Canberra icon building. The hotel chain is known internationally for its interaction with art, which is integrated into the overall hotel design.

EVT' success with Rydges Hotels & Resorts enabled the company to have a large market share of four-star accommodation with-in Australia and New Zealand. Therefore, parent company, Event Hospitality and Entertainment, since expanded into the luxurious accommodation market, by creating QT. The brand has opened nine hotels and resorts in two countries in the span of seven years.

== Properties ==
As of 2024, QT operates 11 hotels in Australia (Bondi (Sydney), Canberra, Gold Coast, Melbourne, Newcastle, Perth, and Sydney CBD) , three in New Zealand (Auckland, Queenstown and Wellington) and one property in Singapore.
