= Donald Maclurcan =

Donald Charles Boulton Maclurcan OBE (5 September 1918 – 3 August 1999) was an Australian architect. As a senior partner of Fowell, Mansfield & Maclurcan (and from 1971, Fowell, Mansfield, Jarvis & Maclurcan), he designed or directed the design of a wide range of building types, from individual houses to important infrastructure projects.

== Early years ==
He was the eldest son of Winifred Kenna and Charles Dansie Maclurcan. His grandmother, Hannah Maclurcan, was the author of "Mrs. Maclurcan's Cookbook" and owned the Wentworth Hotel. Charles Maclurcan (1889-1957) was an electrical engineer and he used the flat roof of the Wentworth Hotel for his pioneering experiments in wireless transmission. Donald Maclurcan was educated at Our Lady of the Sacred Heart College in Bowral and at Saint Ignatius' College, Riverview, where he completed his education in 1936. With the exception of English, his academic record was ordinary, despite his intelligence: he simply was not interested. His school books were strewn with drawings and at the early age of 12 he declared that he wanted to be an architect. His most memorable achievement at school in fact was the notoriety he attracted when, with two friends, he hung a dummy in 1934 over the newly completed Sydney Harbour Bridge which prank garnered news paper coverage. Expulsion was avoided due to the intervention of one Jesuit father who liked him.

== Wartime ==
After leaving school, he attended the Sydney Technical College in Ultimo to study architecture. In 1938, he met his future wife, Margaret Davis. In 1939, he enlisted in the Militia as a despatch rider and whilst unofficially engaged to Margaret, any thought of marriage was placed in abeyance. In 1941, he joined the AIF as a Sapper Second Lieutenant and departed for the Middle East on the Queen Mary in September. On his return in March, 1942, he married Margaret at St Mary's Cathedral, during 10 days leave. He then departed for New Guinea soon becoming a Captain in the 2nd/14th Field Company. In New Guinea, he worked in Port Moresby then walked from Kokoda to Soputa, supervising the maintenance of the roads and bridges whilst being bombed by the Japanese. In 1944, he returned to Australia and collapsed on the parade ground with malaria, weighing less than 7 stone. Invalided out of the army just when he was to be promoted to Major, he resumed his studies with great energy, completing the final 18 months of the course in 6 months. In doing so, he developed an ulcer.

== Architectural career ==
After graduation, he joined the architectural firm of "Fowell and Mansfield" becoming a named partner in June 1946. As a senior partner for 30 years he designed and/or directed the design of a wide range of building types, from individual houses to important infrastructure projects. He developed special expertise in the aesthetics of civil engineering structures and matters concerning visual environment. As a result, he directed the firm's many consultancies to government authorities such as the Snowy Mountains Engineering Authority, the Department of Main Roads and Department of Railways, the State Electricity Commission and the Metropolitan Water Sewerage & Drainage Board. He was chairman of the National Parks Advisory Committee of Architects (1966 to 1976), a member of the NSW State Pollution Control Commission and the Australian Government's Advisory Committee for Expo '74, held in Spokane, United States. He travelled extensively in Europe in 1952 on general architecture studies, in 1960 to the USA on major dams and power stations and in 1967 to both Europe and USA researching road bridges, expressway interchanges and underground rail systems.

== Other achievements ==
He was also President of the Illuminating Engineers (NSW then Australia) in 1952, a member of the Catholic Building and Finance Committee and the first Chairman of the newly formed Zoological Parks Board of NSW from 1973 to 1976, in which capacity he visited major zoos around the world in 1973 to study their design and administration. In 1975, in recognition of these achievements, he was appointed an OBE. Some years earlier, he was recognised by the Catholic Church for his advisory work by being appointed a Knight Commander of the Order of Saint Gregory.

Throughout his career, he also pursued other activities with the same determination he applied to his work. For over 10 years he was President of the Ski Council and in 1960, he acted as Chef de Mission and General Manager of the Australian Viii Olympic Winter Team in Squaw Valley. In 1961, with his brother, Robert, and his sister-in-law, Francine, he built a ski hut in Perisher Valley.

At the same time, he owned a succession of sports cars, including four Bristols, an Aston Martin, MGs and a Riley. He drove them all like there was no tomorrow and maintained many of them himself, applying his significant mechanical skills.

As a young boy, he sailed with his brothers, Douglas and Robert, in a small vessel off Pittwater. This was the start of his other major sporting interest. In 1959, he purchased the 28 foot Daydream, "Mirrabooka" and immediately began competitive racing. He graduated to the 31 foot "Mhairi Dhu" in 1962, then launched the 34 foot "Morag Bheag" in 1969. He continued to race until 1990 culminating with the recognition of "Yachtsman of the Year" at the Royal Sydney Yacht Squadron Annual Prize Giving. He sailed with fierce skill, loved to win but was always generous in his acknowledgment of the skill of his competitor if he was beaten.

== Retirement ==
In 1983, he retired at the age of 65 and thereafter would say he "used" to be an architect, filling his time making exquisite ship models. All of his attention to detail, dexterity and love of the sea came into play and for the next 10 years he produced about 15 models. In 1987, he was commissioned to build a model of the Endeavour for the Australian Bicentenary, which is now in the National Museum of Australia in Canberra. He was delighted to receive a tax credit in lieu of payment. When he was approached to apply his skills to commercial model making, his sense of fairness prevailed and he refused, saying that the work should be directed to those who built models for a living, not a retired gentleman like himself. He was also an accomplished painter and a few privileged friends were given beautiful water colours of their yachts, painted by him in his annual Christmas sojourn to Pittwater on the family yacht. He remained married to Margaret for 57 years until his death in 1999 and they had four children; Charles, Lyndal, Barbara and John.

== Architectural projects ==
- St John’s Anglican Church, Dee Why
- St Thérèse of the Child Jesus Catholic Church, Beauty Point
- Buildings on the upper campus of the University of New South Wales
- Major structures in the Snowy Mountains Scheme, Tumut 3 Power Station in 1973 received the Principal Award for Excellence from the Concrete Institute of Australia
- Power Stations for the Shoalhaven Scheme

For the Department of Main Roads, many bridges including those at:

- Gladesville Bridge (railings and light poles) and the footbridge on the Gladesville side
- Tarban Creek Bridge
- Roseville Bridge
- Stockton Bridge
- Captain Cook Bridge
- Rip Bridge

For the Department of Railways:

- The viaducts and several underground stations of Sydney's Eastern Suburbs railway line. In 1979, Martin Place railway station received awards for outstanding architecture from the Royal Australian Institute of Architects and for Meritorious Lighting from the Illuminating Engineers Society of Australia.

Environmental Impact Studies for:

- Botany Bay and Georges River Basin
- Illawarra Escarpment
- Hawkesbury River Valley
- Port Hacking and Hacking River Basin
- Port Jackson and Parramatta River Basin
- Charlotte Pass, Perisher Valley and Smiggin Holes Planning Report and Gas Pipeline Route from Moomba to Sydney
