= Sydney Technical College =

College in Australia

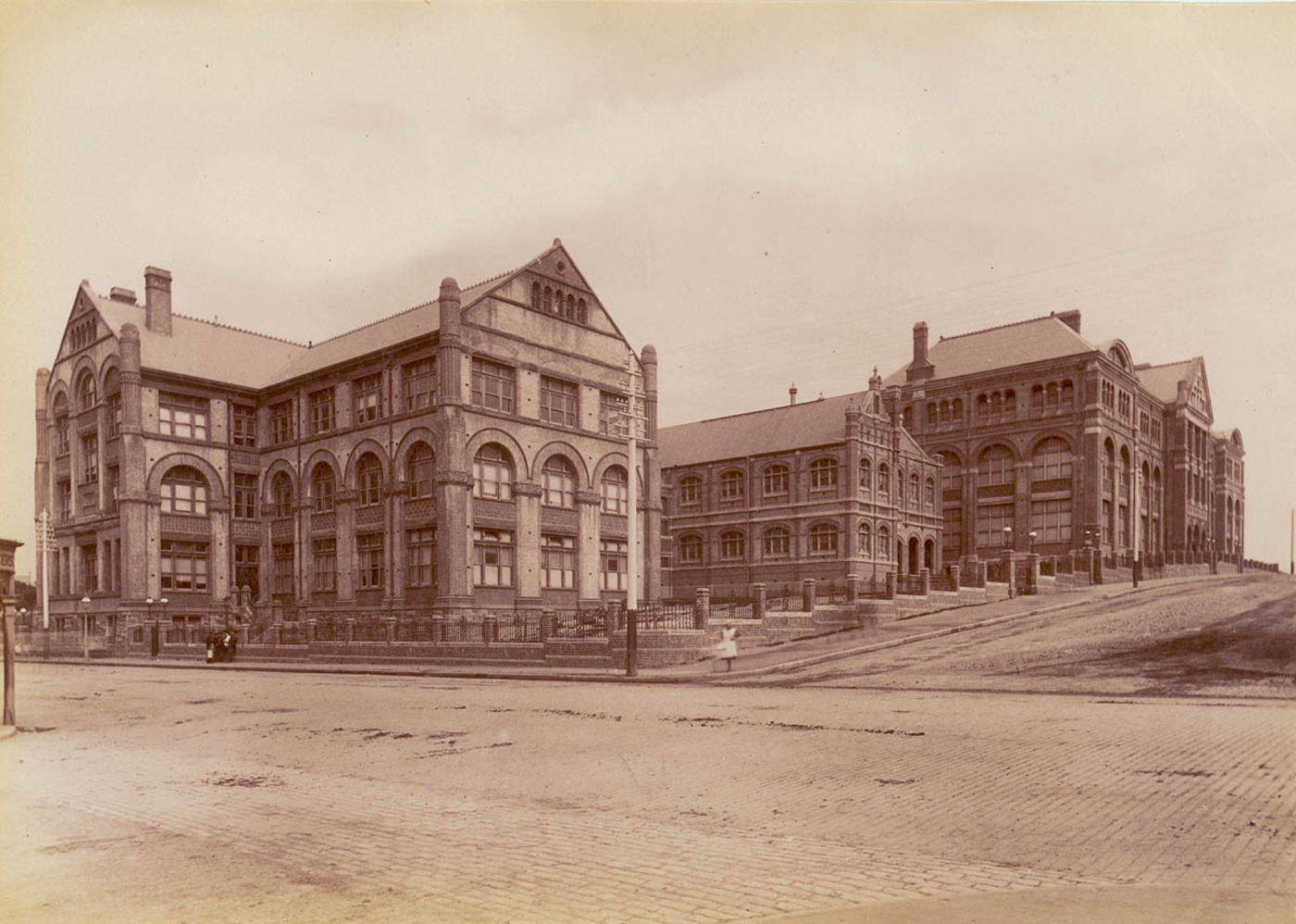
The college, Harris Street & Mary Anne Street in Ultimo (1890s)

The Sydney Technical College, now part of TAFE NSW, is a technical school established in 1878, that superseded the Sydney Mechanics' School of Arts. The college is one of Australia's oldest technical education institutions.

== History ==
The Sydney Mechanics' School of Arts was founded in 1833. In 1878, the Sydney Mechanics' School of Arts formed the Working Men's College, which eventually became the Sydney Technical College in 1882.

In 1911, the high school operations of the college became Sydney Technical High School.

In 1923 Mary Ellen Roberts, who had become a teacher of scientific dresscutting and making at the college in 1900, managed the transfer the courses of women's handicrafts to the East Sydney Technical College.

In 1949, the New South Wales University of Technology (later University of New South Wales) was founded on the college's main site, as a separate institution, before moving to its own campus in Kensington.

In 1969, part of the college became the New South Wales Institute of Technology, which later became the University of Technology Sydney.

Sydney Technical College continued to operate, eventually becoming part of the New South Wales Technical and Further Education (TAFE) system. The college became the Ultimo Campus (aka Sydney Institute) of TAFE New South Wales, located in Ultimo, Sydney.

== Architectural students ==
Many prominent Australian architects studied architecture at Sydney Technical College before there was a university architecture course available in Sydney, but also attended architecture lectures in the Engineering Faculty at the University of Sydney.

- John Allen
- Sydney Ancher
- Arthur Anderson
- Henry Budden
- Walter Bunning
- Hedley Norman Carr
- J Burcham Clamp
- Bruce Dellit
- Jean Fombertaux
- Carlyle Greenwell
- Eric Heath
- Edward Hewlett Hogben
- Archer Hoskings
- Russell Jack
- Joseph Alexander Kethel
- Colin Madigan
- William Monks
- Donald Maclurcan
- Glenn Murcutt
- Sir John Overall
- Lord Livingstone Ramsay
- Bruce Rickard
- Lindsay Gordon Scott
- John K. Shirley
- Emil Sodersten
- Florence Mary Taylor
- Thomas Tidswell
- Alfred Warden
- B J Waterhouse
- William Hardy Wilson

== Gallery ==
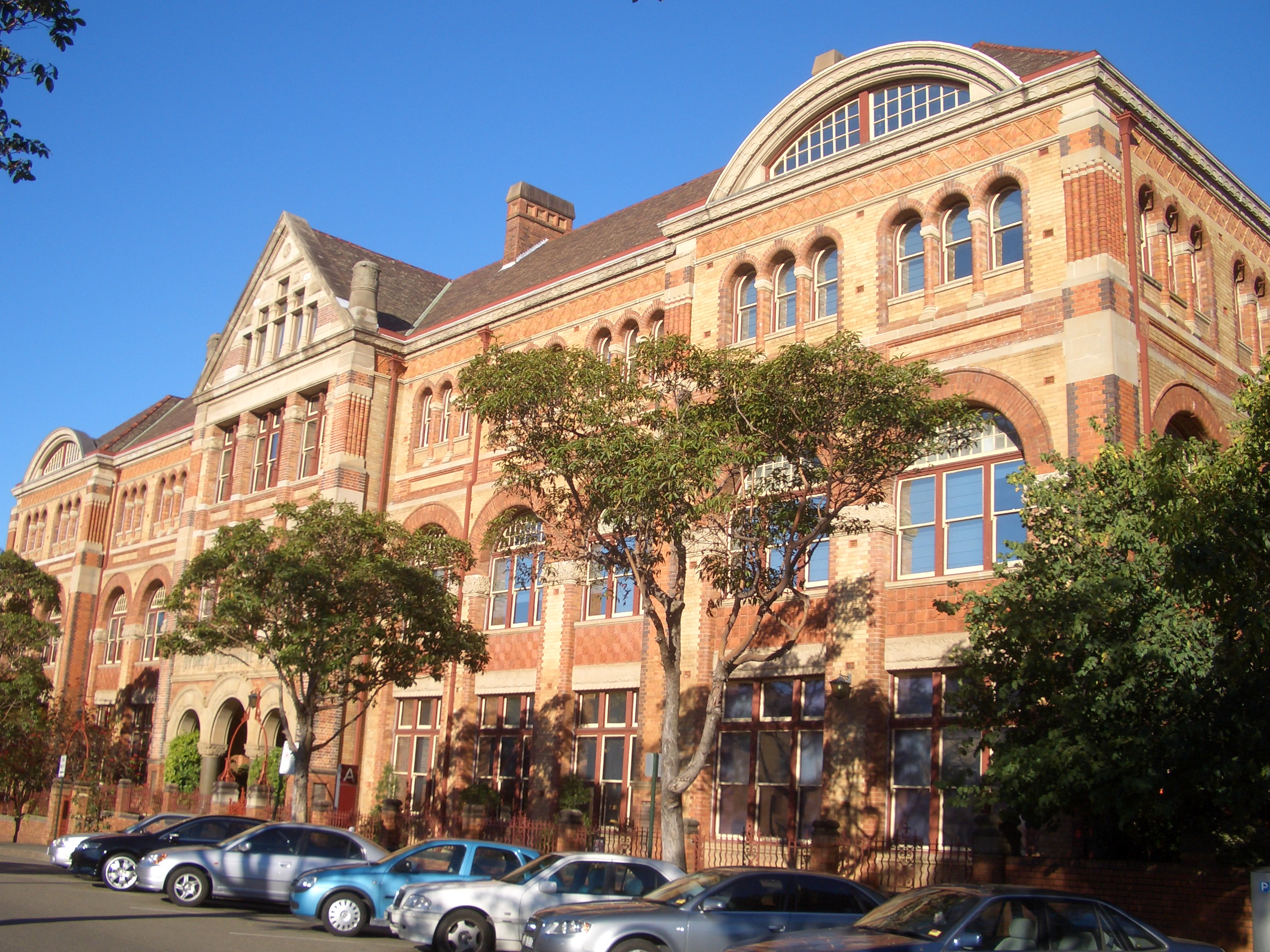
Sydney Technical College

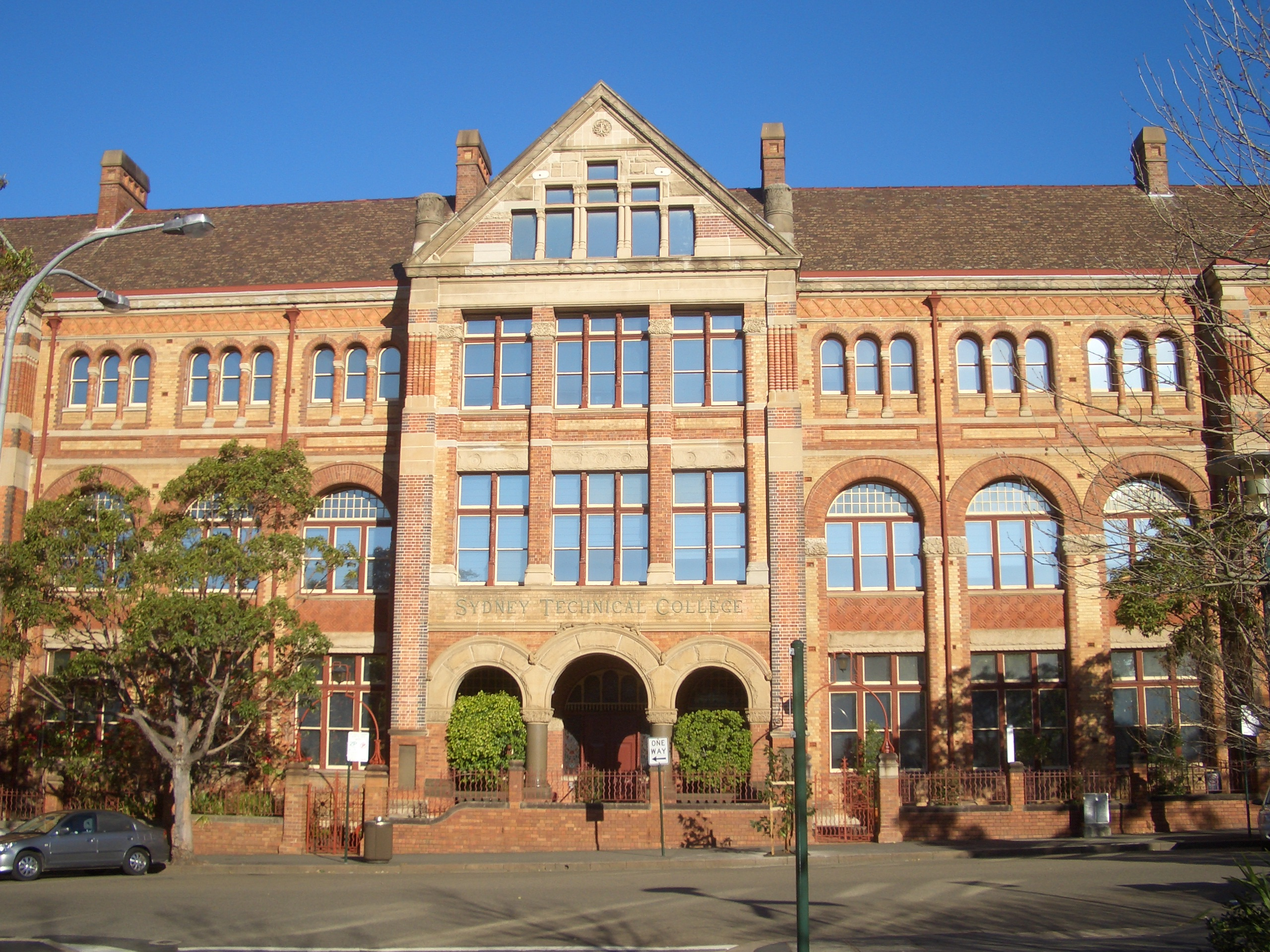

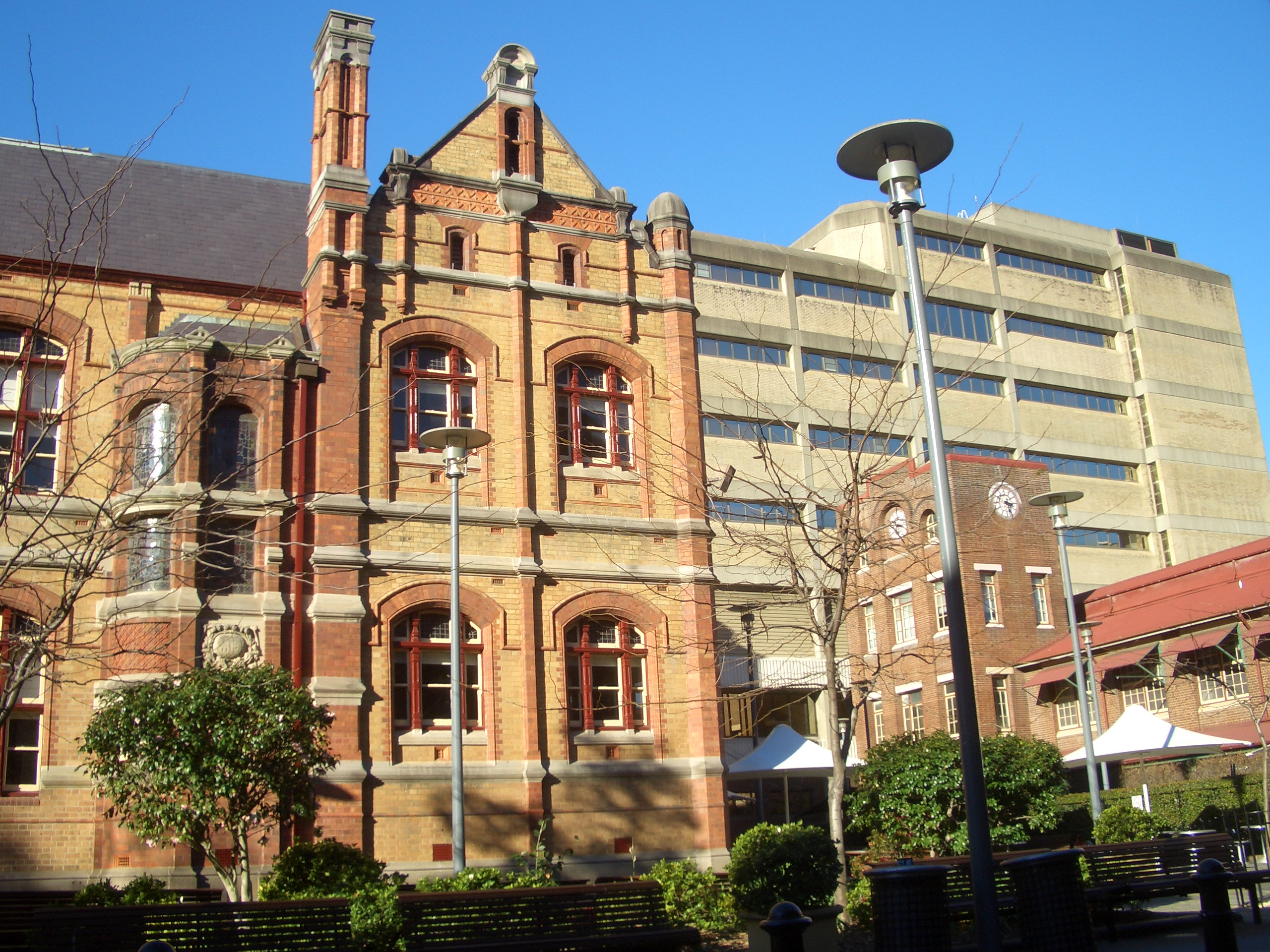

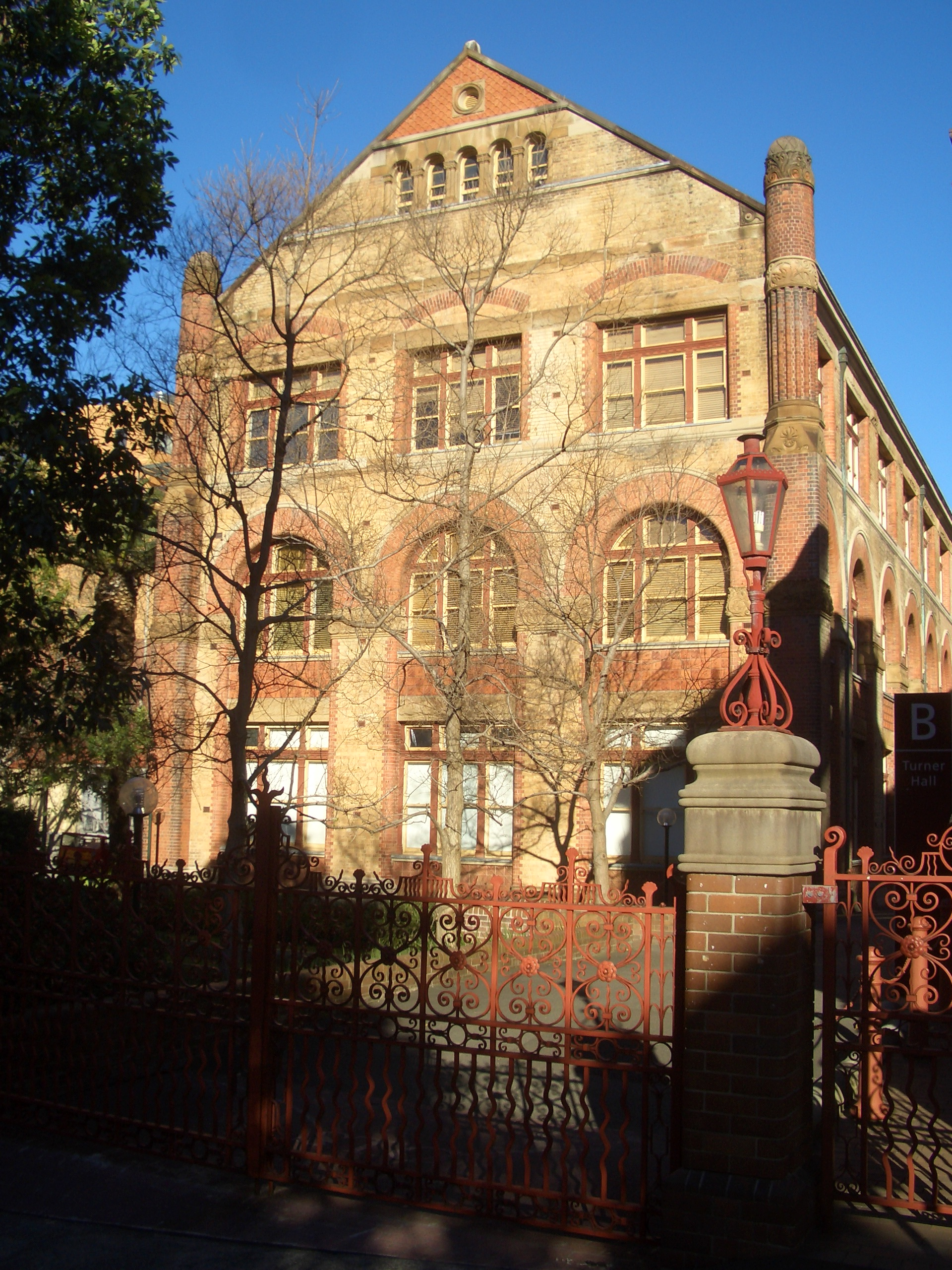
