= Jean Fombertaux =

French-Australian architect

Jean Fombertaux (1920–1976, Sydney, Australia) was a French émigré architect who spent most of his career designing buildings in and around Sydney. His style was exemplary of Sydney architecture during the 1960s and was significant to the modernist movement.

== Life ==
Fombertaux was born in Nice, France and was brought up in the French colonies of South East Asia. The adolescent Fombertaux arrived in Australia when he was sixteen years old, after fleeing the war. His father worked in the French Foreign Service and he had to endure a strict upbringing. In later years, Fombertaux studied architecture at the Sydney Technical College with Russell Jack and Bruce Rickard and graduated in 1947. Like many of the Sydney-based architects, Fombertaux chose to build his own house on the North Shore where he built one of Australia’s iconic houses, the Fombertaux House. In the year of the house's completion, Fombertaux was offered a position in the office of Le Corbusier, but never returned to France to take the offer. His son, André Fombertaux, spent most of his life living in and working on Fombertaux House until 2017 when the home transferred ownership. Andre consulted on repairs as the unofficial caretaker of the home until his passing in 2025. He is survived by his three daughters.

== Architecture ==
Jean Fombertaux was raised in a pokey and dim Federation era house; his style of architecture was in revolt against such environments and was heavily influenced by Frank Lloyd Wright and Alvar Aalto. Fombertaux's style has been likened to that of Harry Seidler, with whom he collaborated for an entry to the Sydney Opera House competition.

=== Notable projects ===
Fombertaux house

The Fombertaux house was designed by Jean Fombertaux in 1966 and is located on the sandstone ledges of Sydney’s North Shore. Fombertaux designed the house as his own family home, and lived there with his wife and children from 1966 until his death in 1976. Fombertaux’s proposal was an open and transparent environment with openings in walls to create a visual connection between rooms inside. He also incorporated large floor to ceiling windows to tie the sunlight and surrounds into the house. The house is constructed of 16 slender steel columns laid out in a grid. The floors are a series of concrete slabs that spiral upwards, defining the differently programmed areas of the house. A light well runs down the centre of the house which contains a staircase connecting all three levels. The house was not completed to its original design at the time of construction, due to financial limitations. Less durable steel was used in construction, and eaves were left off, among other things. Due to local council regulations, no major modifications may be made to the house which has created difficulties for the family when they wanted to complete the project to its original design. The house transferred ownership out of the Fombertaux family in 2017, however, Jean's son, André Fombertaux, consults on repairs and enhancements to the residence as ongoing (unofficial) caretaker.
