= Hedley Norman Carr =

Australian architect

- Born: 21 March 1904; Orange, New South Wales, Australia
- Died: 9 June 1966 (aged 62); Mosman, New South Wales, Australia
- Education: Wolaroi Methodist Boys College; Newington College; Sydney Technical College
- Occupation: Architect
- Spouse: Gwendolen (née Axtens)
- Children: 3

Hedley Norman Carr F.R.A.I.A., A.R.I.B.A. (21 March 1904 – 9 June 1966) was an Australian architect active in the mid 20th century as founding partner of Hedley Carr Allen & Watts. His architectural archive is held by the State Library of New South Wales. A detailed biographical record of Carr's architectural career is held at the Australian Institute of Architects in Sydney.

== Early life ==
Carr was born in Orange, New South Wales and spent his early years living in that town. His family were members of the Methodist Church. He grew up in the home built for his parents in 1900 Tyneside 15 Sale Street. Carr was one of six children of Frank Pattison Carr and Annie Maria (née Howard) and was educated locally at Orange Public School, Wolaroi Methodist Boys College and for two senior years (1921-1922) as a boarding student at Newington College in Sydney. He graduated from the Department of Architecture at Sydney Technical College (STC) in 1927 having served his articles under Old Newingtonian architect Arthur Anderson. In his final year of study he was elected President of the Architectural Society at STC. Carr married in March 1930, and then traveled to the United States. He was then employed in Monteray, California and then was involved in several large public building projects in Washington D.C. From North America he and his wife went on to England, Ireland and Europe.

== RIBA Bronze Medal ==
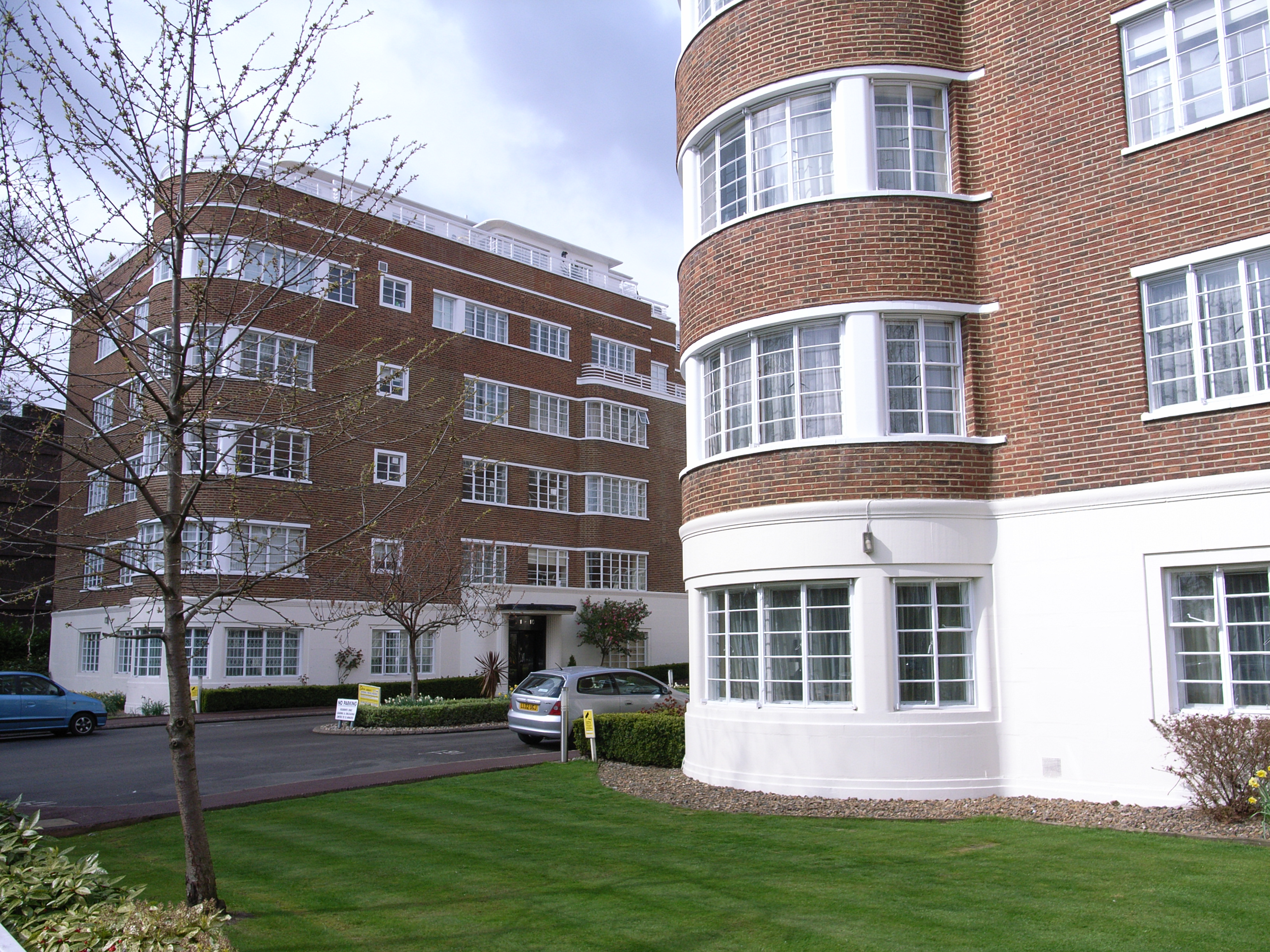
Carr won the RBIA Bronze Medal for his work on the design of Stocklelgh Hall in Regent’s Park while in the office of Robert Atkinson & A.F. Anderson.

In 1937, That firm was awarded the bronze medal of the Royal Institute of British Architects for the best building erected in London that year. The winning design was for a £180,000 block of flats. The building, Stockleigh Hall, is in Prince Albert Road Regent's Park. It covered an area of 1 and a half acres and contains 60 flats in six blocks. Each block has its own entrance from a courtyard. The building is faced with soft-toned red brick with stone dressings and the entrance halls and all doors in the principal rooms are of Australian walnut. In a reference written and dated 9 January 1936 and signed by Robert Atkinson F.R.I.B.A: " ....we should like to put on record that you had the entire charge of the Stockleigh Hall job, (a large Block of Flats), from practically its inception until its virtual completion. This job for many reasons, unusually complicated and made big demands on your extensive knowledge of construction, your organising ability and your tact and commonsence."

== Mosman houses ==
In 1939, after returning to Australia from six years working aboard Carr designed a family home Finedon at 4 Ryrie Street, Mosman and some of its furniture. When the home was sold by the Carr family in 1983 it was photographed and some of the furniture was acquired by the Caroline Simpson Library & Research Collection of Museums of History NSW as representative of 1930s Sydney design. In 1939 Carr also designed a house at 8 Beauty Point Road, Mosman. The three-storey home was on a steep site that fell from the street down towards the water's edge.

== MARS ==
In 1939, Carr became a founding member of the Modern Architectural Research Society (MARS). MARS Group, was an architectural think tank founded in 1933 by several prominent architects and architectural critics of the time involved in the British modernist movement.

== Architectural career ==
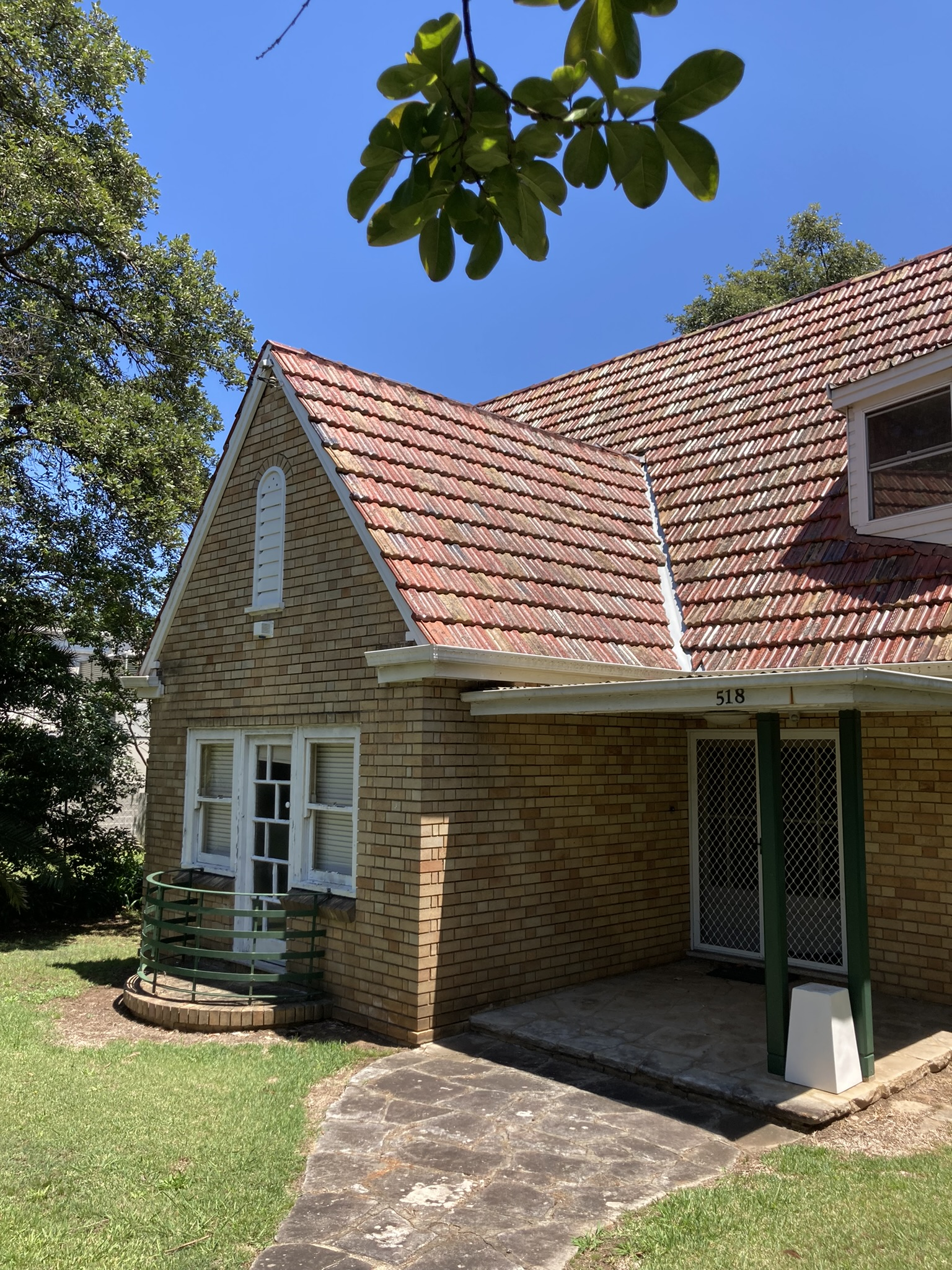
Chatswood South Uniting Church Parsonage designed by Carr in 1937

In 1939, Carr designed a memorial church for the Berry family in Trundle, New South Wales to celebrate their arrival in that district in 1888. The brickwork of the then Methodist Church was red in an old English style. The body of the church is only 19 feet wide and the tower is over 30 feet high with a shallow-pitched roof, on a deformed octagon which is surrounded by a wrought iron finial. The roof is tiled to harmonise with the brick work, and the internal finishing is cement rendered above a dado height. This is coloured cream, in order to lighten the internal appearance. At the time of its construction, the design was described as being Inter-War Medieval Gothic. In 1941 and 1947 Carr was on the jury of the Royal Australian Institute of Architects Sulman Award. The Old Newingtonians’ Union panel of honorary architects, largely under Carr's convenership, was responsible for the post World War II development of Newington College including the building of the War Memorial Block, the Prescott Block, the Science Block, the Nesbit Wing and the Centenary Hall. Throughout his career Carr worked for the Methodist Church as a communicant member of that Christian denomination. Not only did he design buildings for the Methodist schools that he was an Old Boy but for parish churches as well. Chatswood South Uniting Church, built in 1871, is the oldest surviving Methodist church north of Sydney Harbour. It is a picturesque Gothic style church designed by Thomas Rowe. In the era when Carr was articled to Arthur Anderson the sanctuary, two vestries and the pipe organ were added to that church. In 1937 the Chatswood South parsonage was designed by Carr.
