= Hannah Maclurcan =

Australian hotelier and cookbook author (1860–1936)

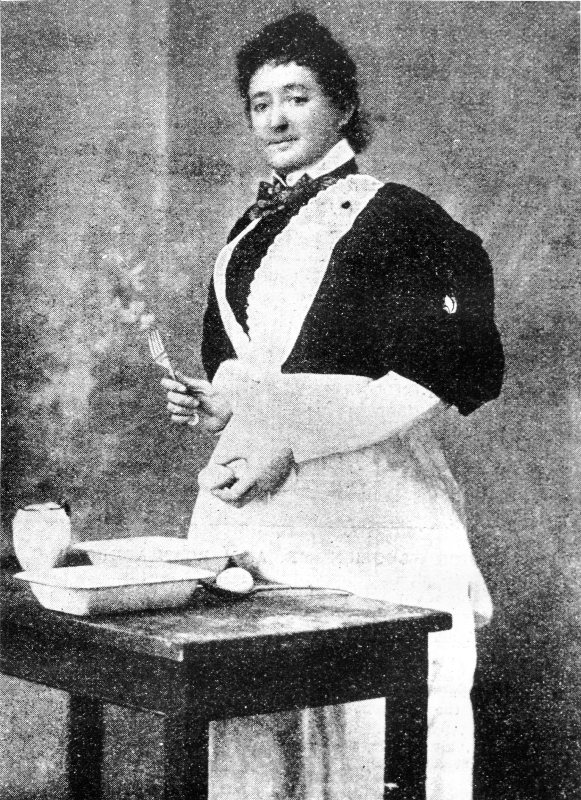
Mrs Hannah Maclurcan, 1898

Hannah Maclurcan (née Phillips; 1860–1936) was a cook and hotelier in Australia. She was the author of the very popular cookbook "Mrs. Maclurcan's cookery book : a collection of practical recipes specially suitable for Australia". She is also known as Hannah Maclurcan Lee.

== Early life ==
Hannah Phillips was born on 17 October 1860 in Tambaroora, New South Wales, the daughter of Jacob Aaron Phillips, a London-born Jewish storekeeper and his first wife Susan (née Moses) from Scotland. Her mother died in 1866. Her family moved to Toowoomba before she was a year old and then on to Brisbane when she was 10.

== Hotelier ==
Her father owned a number of hotels and Hannah gained a thorough knowledge of the business at a very early age. Her father put her into the kitchen of his hotel at Brisbane, and she worked through the dining room to the office, until she knew how to organise and manage a hotel. When she was only 15 years of age, she was manager for her father of the Club Hotel in Sandgate although her obituaries state incorrectly it was Toowoomba.

On 25 March 1880 Hannah Phillips married English born Robert Watson Wigham at her father's home in Brisbane. The couple had their first daughter born in February 1881. They left for England later that year and their second daughter was born there in 1882. Hannah returned to Australia in 1883.

In April 1884, Hannah Wigham applied for her first publican's licence which was for the Club Hotel on the corner of Margaret and Ruthven Street, Toowoomba. She married her second husband, Donald Maclurcan, in June 1887.

Her father was bankrupt in January 1892 owing £4,000.

In 1894, she and Donald moved to Townsville, running the Criterion Hotel and then moving to the Queen's Hotel. Maclurcan's cookbook known as "Mrs. Maclurcan's Cookery Book" was first published in 1898. She helped the Townsville printers, Thankful Willmett, to set the type, and when the establishment ran out of type, she bought some more. The first edition sold out in a fortnight. The second edition was published in Sydney. The third edition was published in London, at the time of the jubilee of Queen Victoria, who accepted a copy. Until 1929 there was a new edition published almost every year.

The Maclurcans came to Sydney in 1901, when Donald leased the Wentworth Hotel which Hannah described as "with 30 rooms and an unpopular name". Donald died in 1903. The venture was an unusually large business undertaking for a woman in those days. She did all the cooking for two years with only the help of two Chinese boys in the kitchen. When her chefs refused duty at the Wentworth Hotel at one point, she locked the gates on them and took on new men. In 1909, Hannah purchased the lease of the hotel and undertook ambitious plans to expand. In 1912, she raised capital on the Sydney Stock Exchange by forming The Wentworth Hotel Limited, a limited liability company and she became its governing director — a position she retained for more than 20 years. It has been said she may have been the first woman to become managing director of an Australian listed company. During that time she bought land on either side of the hotel, and remodelled and rebuilt until she had achieved a modern hotel. She was actively associated with the management of the Wentworth Hotel until 1932, when she handed over responsibility to her son Charles Dansie Maclurcan (born 1889). Although Charles was an electrical engineer who used the flat roof of the hotel for his pioneering experiments in wireless transmission, he had been a director of the company since 1916. Maclurcan's daughter Evelyn Clara (born 1888, later Mrs F. C. Postle) was also a director.

Throughout her life she was involved in numerous charities. During World War I, she worked for numerous comfort funds for the troops.

== Later life ==
In 1924, Maclurcan purchased a house called Bilgola at Bilgola Beach from William Bede Dalley, which became the focus of her life and a place to display her curios and antiques.

On 17 August 1931, Maclurcan married Robert Lee at St Nicholas's Church of England, Mordialloc, Melbourne.

Maclurcan Lee died at St Vincent's Hospital, Sydney on Sunday 27 September 1936 at 75 years of age. She was survived by her husband, Robert Lee, her three daughters: Mrs. Ralph Moore, whose home was in England, Mrs. Spencer Watts, and Mrs. F. C. Postle and her son, Charles Dansie Maclurcan, of Strathfield, one of the pioneers of wireless in Australia.

Her husband Robert Lee died on 17 October 1937 at Waverley.

== Legacy ==
Her son Charles Dansie Maclurcan was a prominent early wireless experimenter before World War I (callsign: XDM) with his firm of Maclurcan and Lane. When amateur licensing recommenced after World War II, Charles was one of a handful initially licensed and the first to commence regular music broadcasts from 1922 (callsign: 2CM). Her grandson Donald Charles Boulton Maclurcan (son of Charles) became a well-known architect.

The Wentworth Hotel continued operation under the control of the Maclurcan family until 1950 when Qantas purchased a controlling interest. Qantas constructed a new 400 room Wentworth Hotel completed in 1966 which it operated until 1982 when the hotel was sold. In 2002, the hotel was purchased by the Accor and under that ownership operates (as at 2018) as the Sofitel Sydney Wentworth.

== Published works ==
- Maclurcan, Hannah (1898). Mrs. Maclurcan's cookery book : a collection of practical recipes specially suitable for Australia (First ed.). T. Willmett & Company.
