= Sofitel Sydney Wentworth =

Hotel in Sydney, New South Wales, Australia

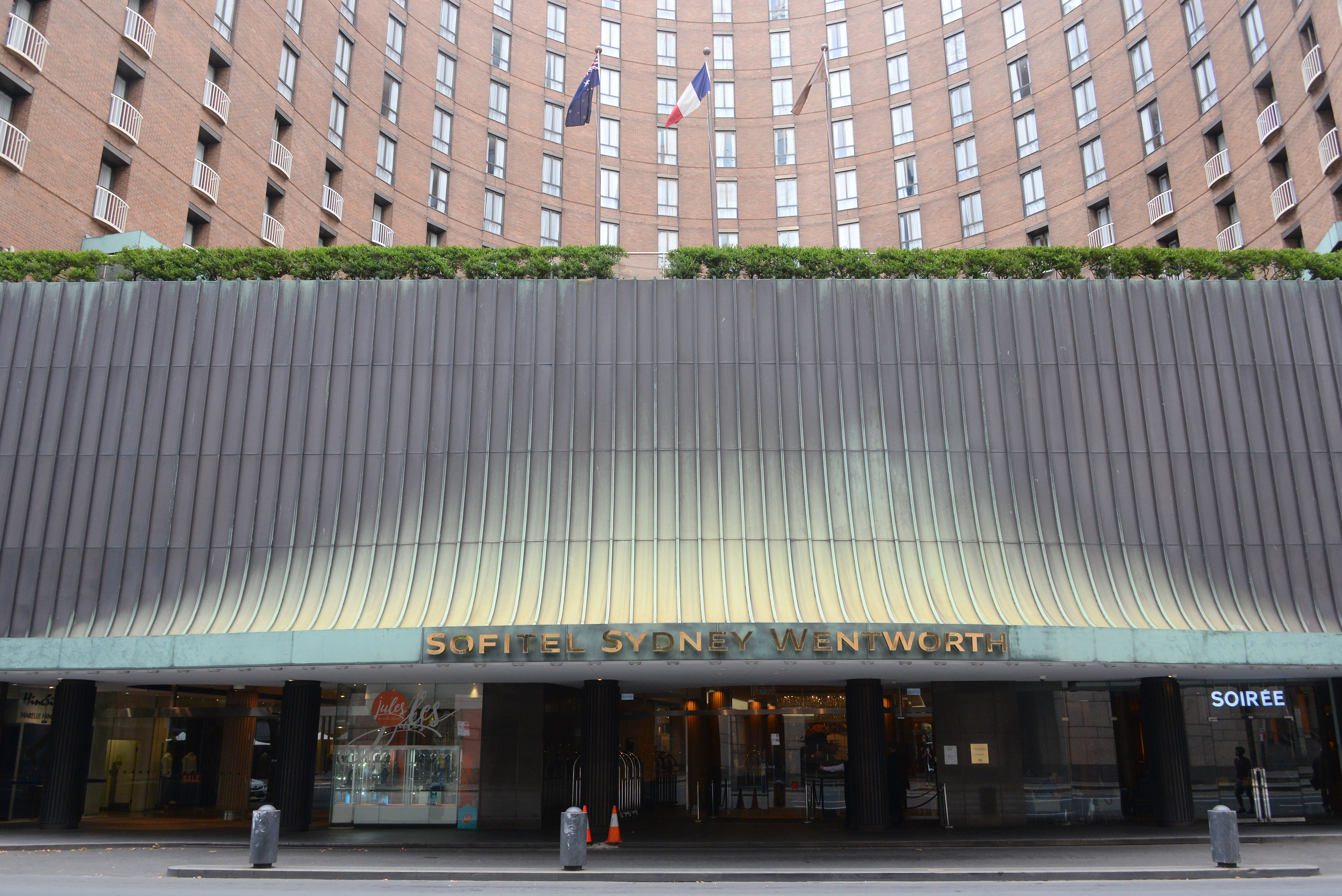
- Phillip Street entrance in 2019
- Interactive map of the Sofitel Sydney Wentworth area
- Former names: Wentworth Hotel (1966–1982); Sheraton Wentworth Hotel (1982–1995); The Wentworth—A Rydges Hotel (1995–2004)
- Alternative names: Wentworth Hotel
- Hotel chain: Sofitel

General information
- Location: Sydney, New South Wales, Australia, 61–101 Phillip Street
- Coordinates: 33.86558°S 151.21101°E
- Named for: Wentworth Hotel (1855–1966)
- Construction started: 1 July 1963
- Opened: 14 December 1966
- Cost: A$11 million
- Owner: KKR

Height
- Height: 58.8–63.4 m (193–208 ft)

Technical details
- Floor count: 20 (17 above ground)
- Floor area: 33,589 m^{2} (361,550 sq ft)
- Lifts/elevators: 7

Design and construction
- Architect: John Barney Rodgers (project director)
- Architecture firm: Skidmore, Owings & Merrill with Laurie & Heath
- Developer: Qantas
- Engineer: Rankine & Hill; Hodgson & Lee Pty Ltd (Electrical)
- Quantity surveyor: Rider Hunt & Partners
- Main contractor: A. Bradshaw (Excavations) Pty Ltd; T. C. Whittle Pty Ltd (Construction)

Other information
- Number of rooms: 436
- Number of suites: 45
- Parking: 350

Website
- www.sofitelsydney.com.au

New South Wales Heritage Database (Local Government Register)
- Official name: Wentworth Hotel Including Interiors
- Type: Local heritage (built)
- Designated: 7 April 2000
- Part of: Sydney Local Environmental Plan 2012
- Reference no.: I1674

The Sofitel Sydney Wentworth (also referred to as the Wentworth Hotel) is a heritage-listed luxury five-star hotel located at 61–101 Phillip Street in the Sydney central business district, New South Wales, Australia. The Wentworth Hotel on this site opened in December 1966, to a design by associate architects Skidmore, Owings & Merrill and Laurie & Heath in the Post-war International Style, replacing the original Wentworth Hotel on Lang Street, which had operated since 1855 as one of Sydney's most prominent hotels. Originally owned and operated by Qantas, the hotel was operated by Sheraton from 1982, Rydges from 1995, and has been operated by Sofitel since 2004. The hotel stands at a height of 58.8–63.4 m (193–208 ft), with 20 floors and 436 hotel rooms.

== History ==
=== Development ===
The history of the hotel dates back to 1855, when the Wentworth Hotel was first opened as a boarding house on Lang Street further to the west in inner Sydney. Owned and run by the Maclurcan family, the Wentworth Hotel eventually grew to become one of the city's premier hotels, alongside The Australia Hotel (opened 1891) on Castlereagh Street, and the Hotel Metropole (opened 1880) on Bent, Phillip and Young Streets. With the growth of tourism and visitors to Sydney in the post-war period, there was an identified shortage of hotel space in the city, and Qantas Empire Airways sought to acquire a hotel with which they could integrate their operations, similar to the relationship between Pan Am and Intercontinental Hotels. In September 1950, Qantas purchased the Wentworth Hotel from the Maclurcan family for £275,000, by purchasing the shares of the holding company, Wentworth Hotel Limited. Qantas then formed a new holding company, Qantas Wentworth Holdings, to manage the hotel for the airline. In September 1951, Qantas opened a new booking terminal in the hotel.

With the development and completion of the Chevron Hilton Hotel on Macleay Street, Potts Point, in 1959–1960, Qantas also sought at the same time for a contemporary style hotel that would meet the needs of travellers. Associated with the development for Qantas House on Phillip Street, which was completed in 1957 to a design by Rudder, Littlemore & Rudder, Qantas started buying up land in the block bounded by Phillip, Bligh and Bent Streets. In 1955, Qantas had purchased the historic Union Club site on Bligh Street for £500,000, with an arrangement for the club to stay in place for three years while a new clubhouse was built immediately to the north on the corner with Bent Street.

With a preliminary submission of the project submitted to the Commonwealth Government in 1958, in October 1962, the managing director of Qantas, Sir Hudson Fysh, announced that Qantas would build a substantial new 452-room hotel immediately adjacent to Qantas House at a cost of £4 million primarily on the site of the old Union Club. The hotel proposal was approved by the Federal Cabinet in August 1961. On the recommendation of Qantas board director, Robert Law-Smith, the prominent American architectural firm of Skidmore, Owings & Merrill, was commissioned to design the hotel, in association with a local architectural firm, Laurie & Heath. The unique design was noted for its semi-circular tower design placed upon a podium, somewhat echoing Arne Jacobsen's design for the SAS Royal Hotel in Copenhagen, Denmark, for Scandinavian Airlines (1960).

Demolition and excavation for the project began on 1 July 1963 by A. Bradshaw (Excavations) Pty Ltd, and construction commenced from April 1964 by T. C. Whittle Pty Ltd (Construction), with the design echoing the desire of Qantas to have the character of the hotel be "distinctly Australian in character, using Australian timber, marbles, and stone". The main hotel entrance on Phillip Street featured a 39 metre wide curved copper awning, and the podium walls faced in Trachyte; and the tower walls were faced in dark bricks to contrast from the glass and steel curtain walling of Qantas House next door and to give "distinction and substance". The interiors were the work of interior design for SOM, Audrey Borkenhagen. The Director of the Art Gallery of New South Wales, Hal Missingham, was engaged to advise on the choice of artworks for the hotel, with one of the most prominent commissioned artworks being the Australian wildflower tempera mural by Dennis Adams placed in the foyer of the convention hall. Other artworks and decorative elements included heraldic tapestries of Australian cities by Margaret Grafton, and a sunflower-lighting unit by Edison Price of New York. In an indication of Qantas' intentions regarding the historic Wentworth Hotel, in September 1965, Qantas announced that the new hotel would be named "Wentworth" to "carry on the honourable name and tradition of the most successful and historic Wentworth Hotel."

==== Contractors and suppliers ====
- Demolition and excavation: A. Bradshaw (Excavations) Pty. Ltd.
- Construction: T. C. Whittle Pty. Ltd. (Mascot)
- Quantity surveyors: Rider Hunt & Partners.
- Structural steel (3,800 tonnes): The Sydney Steel Company Pty. Ltd.
- Travertine, marble (Mudgee Gray), trachyte, quartzite, and terrazzo: Melocco Brothers.
- Electrical installation, including cables, outlets, air-conditioning plant and substation: Hodgson & Lee Pty. Ltd.
- Vanity furniture: Rickets & Thorp Pty. Ltd. (Rockdale)
- Furniture, including 1425 'Vista' chairs, trolleys, tables, luggage buggies, racks: Sebel Furniture.
- Furniture for 415 guest rooms and special foyers, carpeting to public rooms: Beard Watson's Contract Division.
- Sanitary ware: R. Fowler Limited ("Fowler Ware")
- Timber floors (Flight Bar, Old Sydney Bar, Dining Room, International Room, Ballroom, Conference Room): George Hudson Pty. Ltd.
- Cash registers, adding machines and accounting machines: The National Cash Register Co. Pty. Ltd.
- Glass fittings, mirrors and glazed doors: Vetro Glass Co. Pty. Ltd. (Alexandria).

=== Opening and growth ===
The final night of the old Wentworth Hotel was held on 13 December 1966, with free drinks provided. The 100 guests staying at the hotel were required to leave by 10:00am on 14 December 1966, with half of the guests transferring to the new Wentworth Hotel on Phillip Street. On its opening, the hotel was promoted as "Australia's first self-contained Convention and Entertainment Centre", and had 448 rooms and 38 suites, featured 12 bars and restaurants (including a "Harbour Bar", "Coral Reef Bar", "Ayers Rock Grill", "Flight Bar", and "Old Sydney Bar and Tavern"), as well as the Grand Ballroom seating up to 1,200 persons. The opening room rates were $9.50 (single) and $13.50 (double) per night. The first year of hotel operation resulted in a loss of $167,950 for Qantas Wentworth Holdings. A profit of $123,130 was reported the following year (1967–1968).

Not long after its opening, the Australian Women's Weekly reported:

Sydney is sure to take the Wentworth Hotel to its gay, pleasure loving heart, for within its red brick walls may be found the essentials high life - luxury, glamor, and built-in discretion. [...] The hotel was designed by a team of American and Australian architects and decorators. They have produced hotel of unobtrusively splendid luxury with a many-faceted personality. The main entrance in Phillip St is the luxury, social part; the Bligh Street entrance, in the middle of Sydney's big business stronghold, is busy, sophisticated, vital. The Qantas Airways terminal is here, surrounded by bars and restaurants. The Wentworth, still less than two months old, already seems to have become an important part of the Sydney scene.

=== Recent history ===
In March 1982, Qantas sold the Wentworth Hotel for $70 million to National Mutual, with the hotel management to be undertaken by Sheraton Pacific Hotels and the hotel being renamed the Sheraton Wentworth Hotel. In August 1995, hotel chain Rydges took over management of the hotel from Sheraton, with the hotel renamed The Wentworth – A Rydges Hotel, and at the same time National Mutual undertook various refurbishments to the Garden Court Restaurant and public spaces.

On 4 April 2000, the hotel and its interiors was listed as a local heritage item by the City of Sydney under the Central Sydney Heritage Local Environmental Plan 2000 (since replaced by the Sydney Local Environmental Plan 2012), with its statement of significance noting:

"The Wentworth Hotel facing Chifley Square is a twenty storey tower of Post War Minimalist Style. It is of historic importance for its association with QANTAS and QANTAS House. The hotel is important as the only Australian work by Skidmore Owings and Merrill, and as the oldest major Sydney Hotel. The Wentworth Hotel is aesthetically significant for the huge copper canopy over the entrance, which at the time of construction, was one of the largest completely fabricated awnings in the world. The distinctive horse shoe design of the Wentworth Hotel is significant as a familiar architectural landmark in Sydney. It was Australia's biggest international hotel at time of construction. It derives social significance from its long-standing status as Sydney's hotel for the rich and famous, for the continuity of the name Wentworth Hotel, and as the venue for the annual Black & White Ball, the major fundraising event of the Black & White Committee, the most patrician of Sydney's charity groups. The building is scientifically significant for the largest air conditioning system, column free ballroom, and as the largest brick structure in the southern hemisphere. The building contains a rare example of a vertical passenger lift spanning four floors."

In 2001, private property investment firm City Freeholds Pty Ltd bought the hotel from National Mutual for $108 million and undertook a major refurbishment of the hotel to maintain its five-star status. In 2004, the management of the hotel was acquired by Accor Group from Rydges, with the hotel to be renamed under the Sofitel brand as the Sofitel Sydney Wentworth. In 2006, Tourism Assets Holdings Limited bought the hotel title for a price reported to be around $150 million.

In May 2010, LaSalle Investment Management bought the title to the hotel for $130 million from Tourism Assets Holdings. In May 2014, LaSalle sold the hotel again to the Singapore-based Frasers Property for over $200 million. In October 2021, Frasers sold the hotel for $315 million to private equity firm KKR.

== Notable guests and events ==
The hotel has been host to many notable visitors over the years. In October 1969, Neil Armstrong, Buzz Aldrin, and Michael Collins stayed at the Wentworth during their Apollo 11 Moon landing world tour. In December 1970, Pope Paul VI was a guest of the hotel on the occasion of the first papal visit to Australia. The hotel hosted Queen Elizabeth II and Prince Philip, Duke of Edinburgh for Royal visit state receptions in 1973, 1980, and 1986.

On 28 March 1983, the hotel ballroom famously hosted the Benevolent Society ball attended by Charles, Prince of Wales and Diana, Princess of Wales during their Royal tour of Australia, whose dance to "The More I See You" captured the attention of the press. In September 2007, the hotel hosted the President of the Russian Federation, Vladimir Putin, and the President of China, Hu Jintao, during their visit to Sydney for APEC Australia 2007. Other visitors have included Bill Gates, Audrey Hepburn, Marlon Brando, Sophia Loren, Margaret Thatcher, and George H. W. Bush.

In 2018, 2019, and 2022, the hotel hosted the Miss Grand Australia beauty pageant. The hotel is also known for being the regular host of state and federal election night events for the Liberal Party of Australia, including every election from 1993 to the 2022 federal elections.
