= Plaza Theatre, Sydney =

Former theatre in Sydney, Australia

Coordinates: 33°52′32″S 151°12′25″E

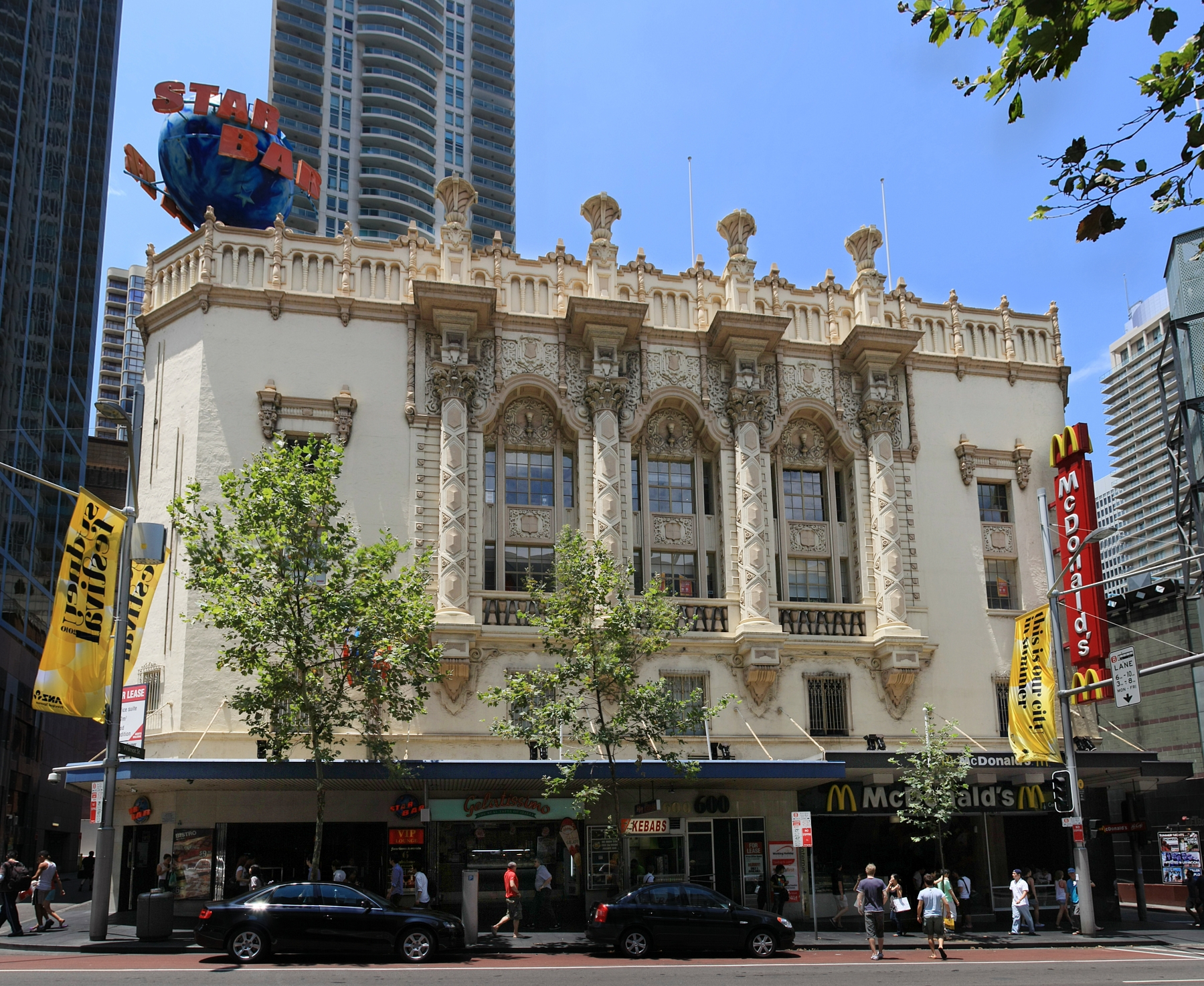
George Street facade of the former Plaza Cinema

The former Plaza Theatre in Sydney, New South Wales is a heritage-listed building designed as a 2000-seat cinema by Eric Heath for the Hoyts Group, and opened in 1930. It is no longer used as a cinema.

== Location ==
The building is located at 600 George Street, Sydney on the western half of the block bounded by Wilmot Street and Central Street to the sides and Pitt Street to the rear. It is a prominent feature of the entertainment sector's streetscape.

== History ==
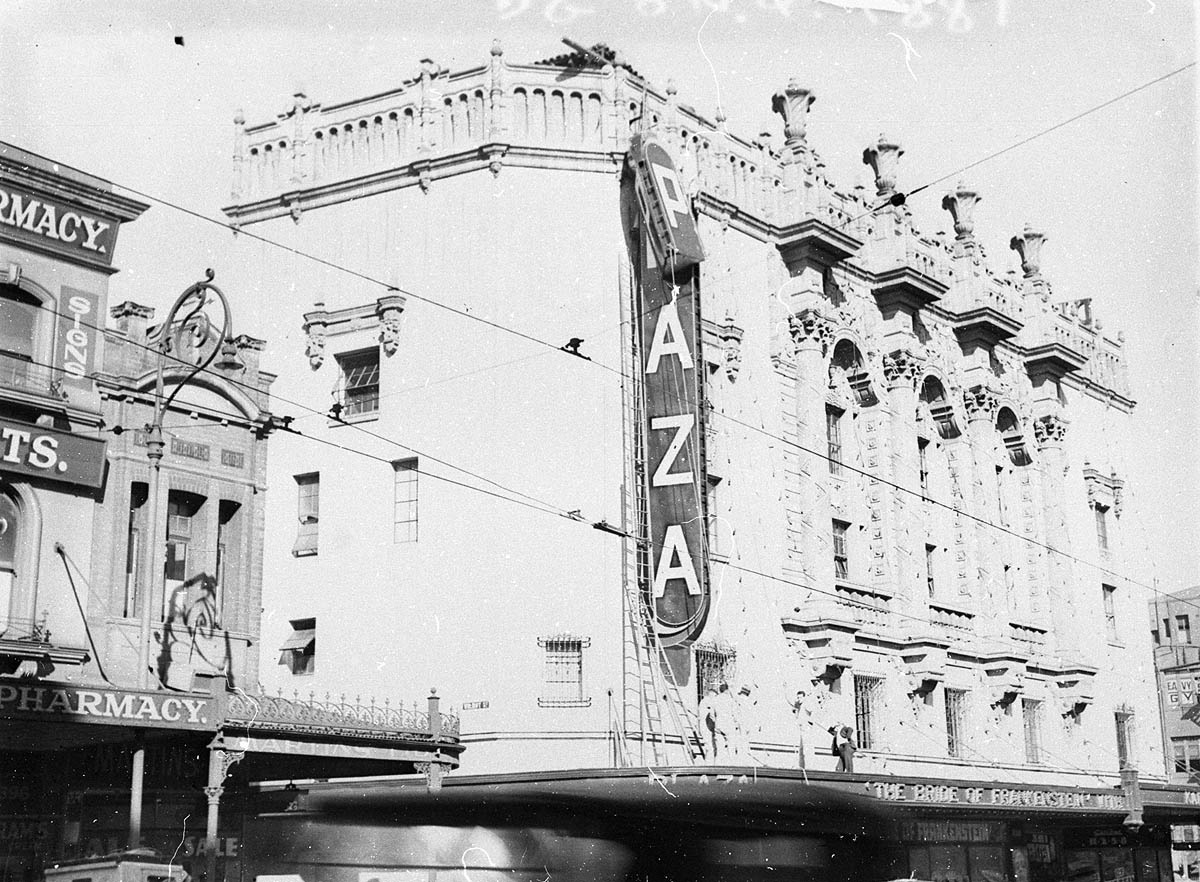
Erecting neon sign "Plaza", Plaza Theatre, c. 1935

The Plaza Theatre was built during a golden age of cinema-going in[Australia and was opened on 11 April 1930, designed as a 2000-seat cinema by Eric Heath for Hoyts.

The theatre's organ was built circa 1923 by the Rudolph Wurlitzer Company of North Tonawanda, New York and was installed at the Plaza in 1937 from the Wintergarden Theatre, Brisbane. It was removed around 1968 and the console was relocated to a private residence in Harris Park, New South Wales.

By 1950 cinema attendance had declined, further affected by the introduction of television in 1956. Many suburban cinemas closed down and in the city a number of theatres were demolished for redevelopment. In 1977 the Plaza was closed as a cinema and the foyer was converted to a McDonald's and the auditorium was converted to a skating rink, concert venue and restaurant. A Heritage order prevented its demolition until 1995 when the auditorium became Planet Hollywood. That area is now a licensed bar.

== Design and construction ==
The building was constructed in the years 1929 and 1930 by the building firm James Porter & Sons and to a design by Eric Heath. The brickwork facade is rendered in a rough cast stucco giving an exaggerated texture. The raised decorative detailing is in precast concrete. There are five floors. including a basement. and the three-storey facade above the awning is symmetrical. It is dominated by a three window four Corinthian column loggia. The columns are supported on pedimented brackets and finish in an entablature incorporating spiral [urn]s. The individual windows are topped by decoration, and the north-west corner is chamfered.

== Significance ==
The building is an example of central Sydney's inter-war building boom in theatre buildings and one of a handful of central Sydney's surviving theatre buildings.

The building is of historic significance at a State level due to its ability to reflect the inter-war boom period of picture palace buildings in Sydney and for its contribution to the development of Sydney's George Street cinema precinct. It is an example of the Spanish Mission style and is particularly notable for its external Baroque detailing. It is listed on the Heritage Register of New South Wales as well as the Register of the National Estate.

== Interiors ==
The majority of the interior detailing has been lost since the building's demise as a cinema, although remnants remain in the McDonald's restaurant that is now in sections of the original foyer. These include sections of the beamed ceiling, typical Spanish motifs and coloured and stencilled floral motifs on the ceiling. Sections of the polychrome stencilled ceilings in the auditorium remain.

== Gallery ==
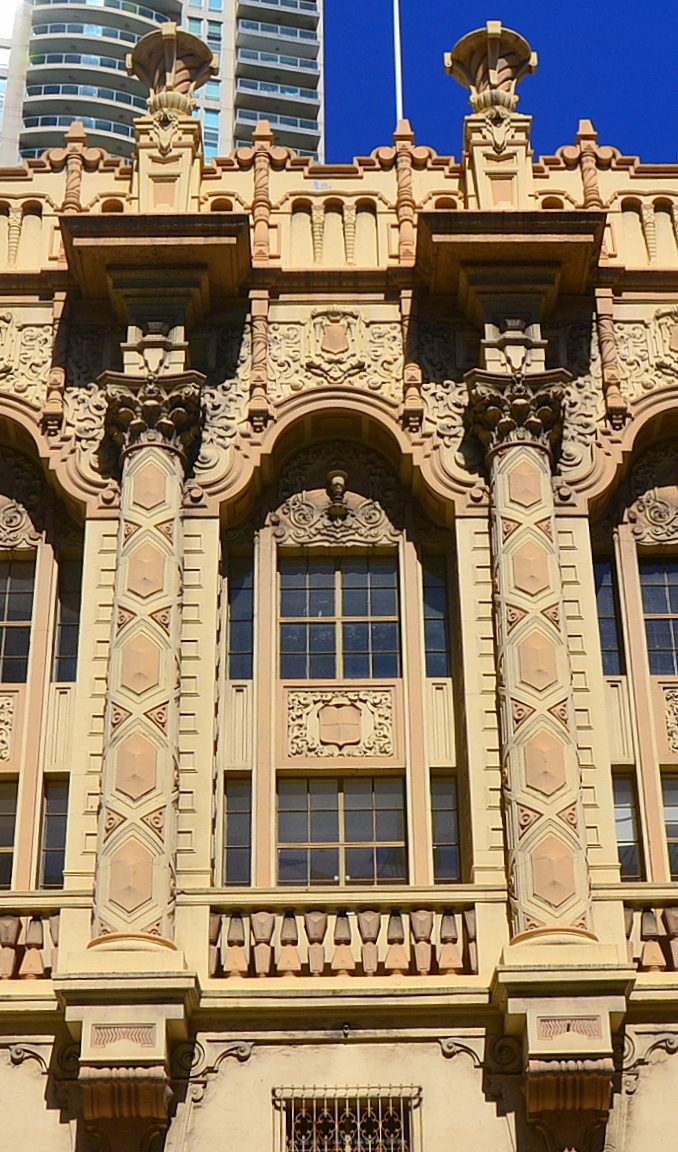
Detail of the George Street façade highlighting the Corinthian column loggia.

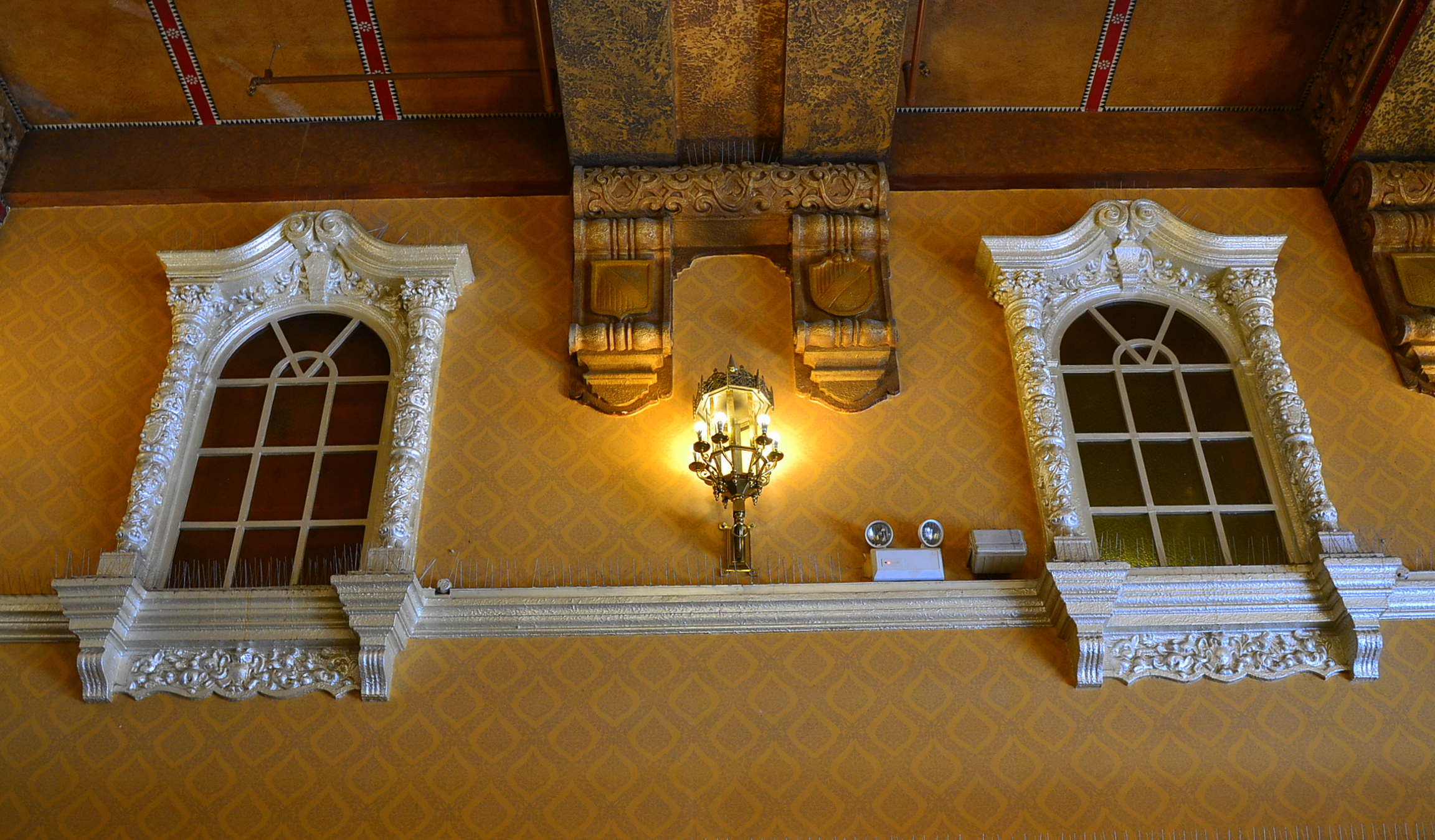
Interior detailing preserved in the foyer.

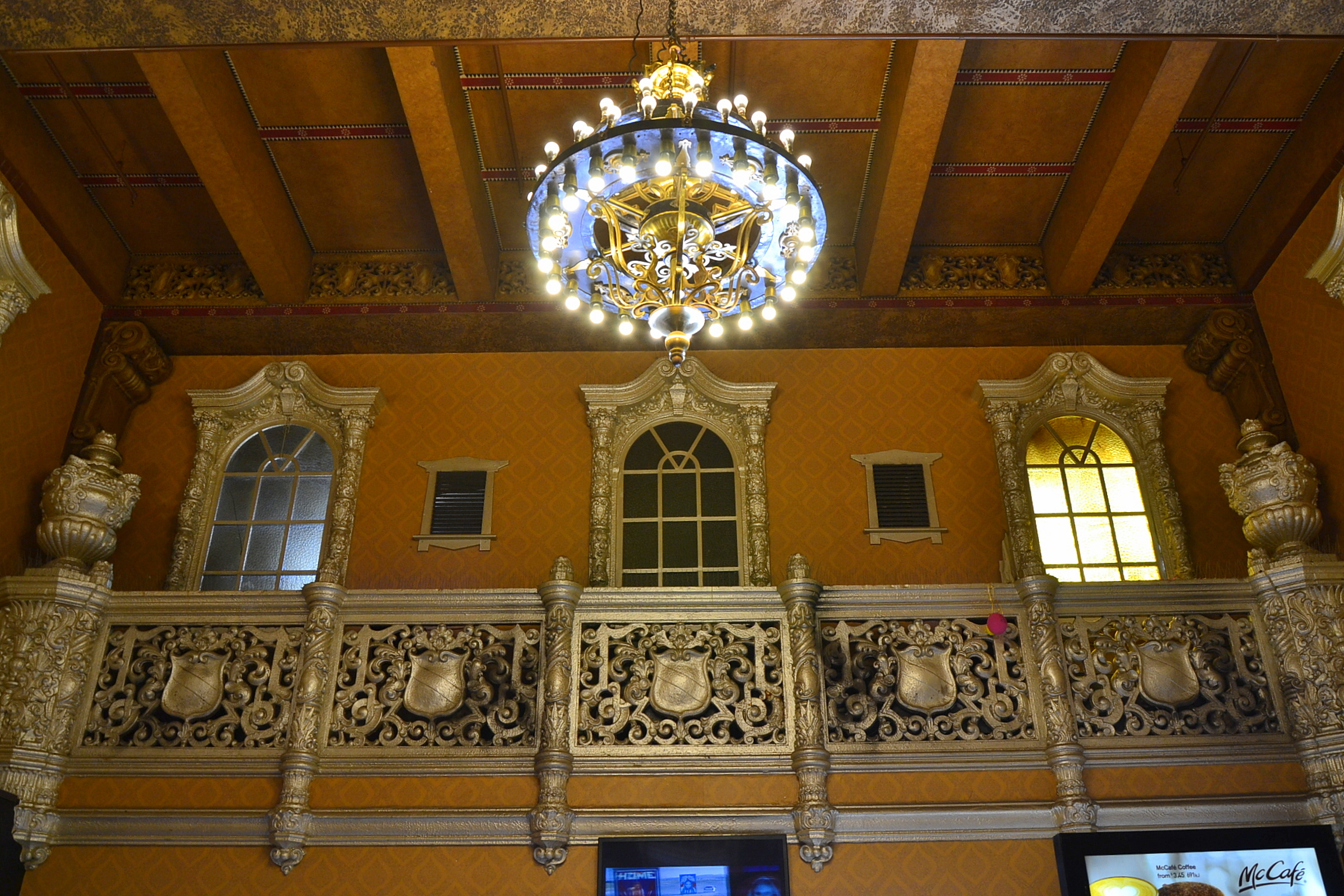
A section of the beamed ceiling showing coloured and stencilled floral motifs.
