= T. Willmetts & Sons Printery =

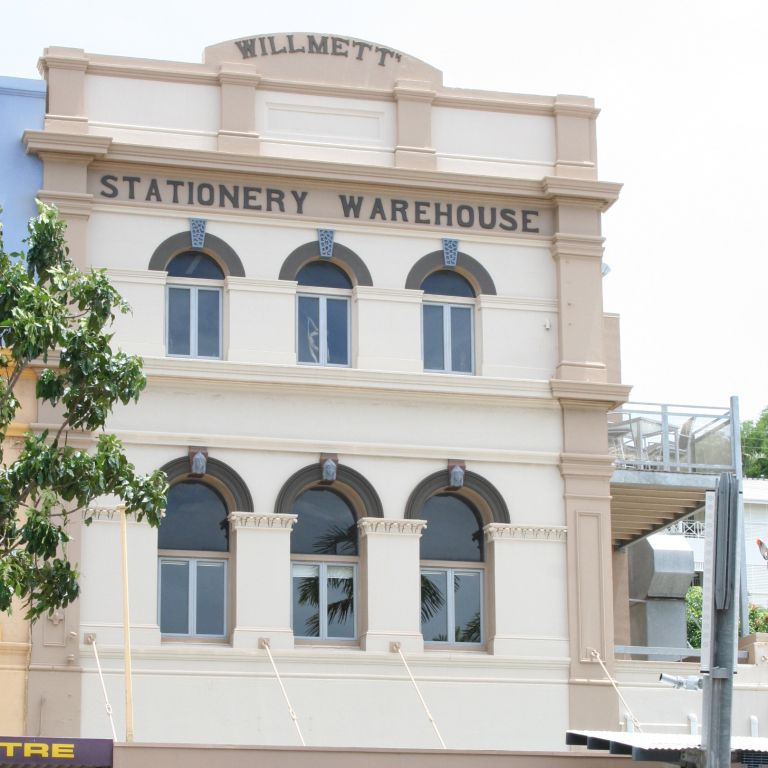
- T. Willmetts & Son printery and stationery warehouse

- Location within Queensland Location within Australia
- 19.2573°S 146.8195°E
- Location: 193 Flinders Street, Townsville CBD, City of Townsville, Queensland, Australia

History
- Design period: 1870s–1890s (late 19th century)
- Built: 1883–1927

Site notes
- Architect: Waggepetersen & Bevan

Queensland Heritage Register
- Official name: T. Willmetts & Sons printery and stationery warehouse (former), Capitol Seafood Restaurant
- Type: state heritage (built)
- Designated: 21 October 1992
- Reference no.: 600898
- Significant period: 1880s, 1920s (fabric); 1883–1975 (historical use)

T. Willmetts & Sons Printery is a heritage-listed former printing house at 193 Flinders Street, Townsville CBD, City of Townsville, Queensland, Australia. It was designed by Waggepetersen & Bevan and built from 1883 to 1927. It is also known as Capitol Seafood Restaurant. It was added to the Queensland Heritage Register on 21 October 1992.

== History ==
The former Willmett's stationery shop and printery is located in the main commercial street of Townsville. It is a three-storey masonry building, constructed in 1883 and 1886 for Thankful Willmett, a well known stationer and printer who was also active in local and regional politics.

Townsville was established in 1864 by partners John Melton Black and Robert Towns and the Port of Townsville was gazetted as a port of entry in 1865. It grew quickly as a major supply centre and by 1880 was the port for several major goldfields. Because commerce was important to the development of the town, many businessmen were also involved in local politics and the majority of early mayors were also businessmen. Thankful Willmett was mayor several times and was also a prominent member of the North Queensland Separationist movement.

Thankful Willmett had been in business in Rockhampton and Nebo for several years before arriving in Townsville in 1868. He ran a store and acted as postmaster at the Cape River Diggings and in 1870 settled in Townsville, working for Clifton and Aplin and operating a small stationery business. In 1873 he resigned to devote his time to his own business, though he was also involved in local politics as he became Mayor for the first time in 1880–1881. In 1882 he imported a printing press and bookbinding equipment to expand his stationery business and opened the Excelsior Printery in one of three new brick shops next to the Exchange Hotel. This met an urgent and growing need in an era when all news, correspondence and business was carried on wholly on paper. In the following year a building was constructed for him by Waagepetersen and Bevan and the first trial telephone call in Townsville was made from the Exchange to Willmett's printery in March 1883. In 1884 a new printing office was constructed to the rear of the stationery shop and bookbinding and lithographic departments were added.

On 15 October 1885 he received a severe setback when the shop was destroyed by fire, though the printery at the rear survived and he still managed to get Willmett's North Queensland Almanac published by the end of the year. In 1886 the current three storey shop was built incorporating the printery behind. It contained warehouse space, offices and a retail shop. The business was extremely successful and in time had branches at Cooktown, Thornborough and Charters Towers. It was more than a printery as they imported and sold paper, produced account books, sheet music and all kinds of stationery and art materials.

In 1898, the business published the first edition of Hannah Maclurcan's cookbook "Mrs. Maclurcan's Cookery Book" which became famous. The first edition sold out in a fortnight.

Willmett's sons and other family members worked for the firm and expanded the business. Willmett's eldest son had originally prompted the movement into printing and Miss E. Willmett ran the book and music departments. Percy Willmett joined the firm in 1904 and took over when Thankful Willmett died in 1906.

In 1927, the machine room in the printery was extended to accommodate new machinery and an additional storey to this section was added as bulk storage space. This work was done by contractor George Lear for architect Charles Venden Rees. In 1932 the business continued to expand by opening a second premises at 287 Flinders Street. There Willmett's used the ground floor as a stationery shop and let the upper floor as Willmett's Chambers. It remained a branch store for almost 50 years. Hume Willmett, a grandson who joined the family firm in 1918, ran the business from 1943, following his uncle's retirement. He retired in his turn in 1970 and Grahame Willmett Weir, a great grandson of Thankful Willmett, then took over. Family members have also been active in local affairs and so both the business and the Willmett family are prominent in Townsville history.

Willmett's moved to South Townsville in 1975 and in October 1980 the firm was purchased by North Queensland Newspaper Company of which it became a wholly owned subsidiary. In 1981 the shop was purchased by Kern Corporation. It has since changed hands several times and has been leased out. The ground floor has been used by a restaurant for much of the time, during which openings were made in the party wall with the building next door which was also used by the restaurant. The upper section has been converted into a loft flat for the owner.

== Description ==
The Willmett's building is located on the northern side of Flinders Street in the centre of the block between Wickham and Denham Streets. The site rises steeply towards Melton Terrace at the rear.

The building is in two parts with the block on Flinders Street having a rectangular plan form and is of three storeys constructed in brick with a symmetrical rendered facade. The ground floor shopfront has been replaced in anodised aluminium but the original entrance to the upper levels, which has a single panelled timber door with side lights, survives to the right of this. A short hall leads to a later concrete block stairwell that rises to the top level. Above this is a later horizontal awning and above this three round headed windows with moulded hoods that run into a string mould that runs into piers at the corners of the facade. Similarly there are three rounded headed windows at the top level also with moulded hoods over. All the windows have been replaced in aluminium. Above this is banding with the words "Stationery Warehouse" in raised lettering with cornices above and below. This is surmounted by a parapet with a raised central section which has a segmental top supported on piers. The facade has been recently painted in a contemporary colour scheme. Behind the parapet is a simple corrugated iron roof with a central raised skylight.

Abutting and sitting higher than the front section of the building is a two and three storey wing constructed in brick with a cement rendered finish all around. This block also has a rectangular floor plan but is slightly wider on the eastern side. The roof is clad in corrugated iron and has a gambrel form. A series of high level timber windows are located on the sides of the building at the upper level. There is a small entrance lean to on the northern side with pathway access to Melton Terrace above.

== Heritage listing ==
T. Willmetts & Sons Printery was listed on the Queensland Heritage Register on 21 October 1992 having satisfied the following criteria.

The place is important in demonstrating the evolution or pattern of Queensland's history.

The style and quality of the former T.Willmett and Sons building demonstrates the prosperity of Townsville in the 1880s and reflects the way in which North Queensland was developed by the establishment of key ports as commercial and administrative centres. As an early printer and the publisher of an almanac as well as a stationer, Willmetts was closely associated with this development.

The place is important in demonstrating the principal characteristics of a particular class of cultural places.

The former Willmett's building is a good example of a retail business with works, warehouse and offices on the premises. As such it demonstrates a nineteenth century practice no longer usual in a city central business district.

The place is important because of its aesthetic significance.

The design, form and materials of the former Willmett's building make a major aesthetic contribution to the streetscape of Flinders Street.

The place has a special association with the life or work of a particular person, group or organisation of importance in Queensland's history.

The building is strongly associated with the life and work of Thankful Willmett, an important Townsville businessman and Mayor, and with other members of this prominent family.
