= Eric Heath (architect) =

Australian architect

Eric Heath – Architect
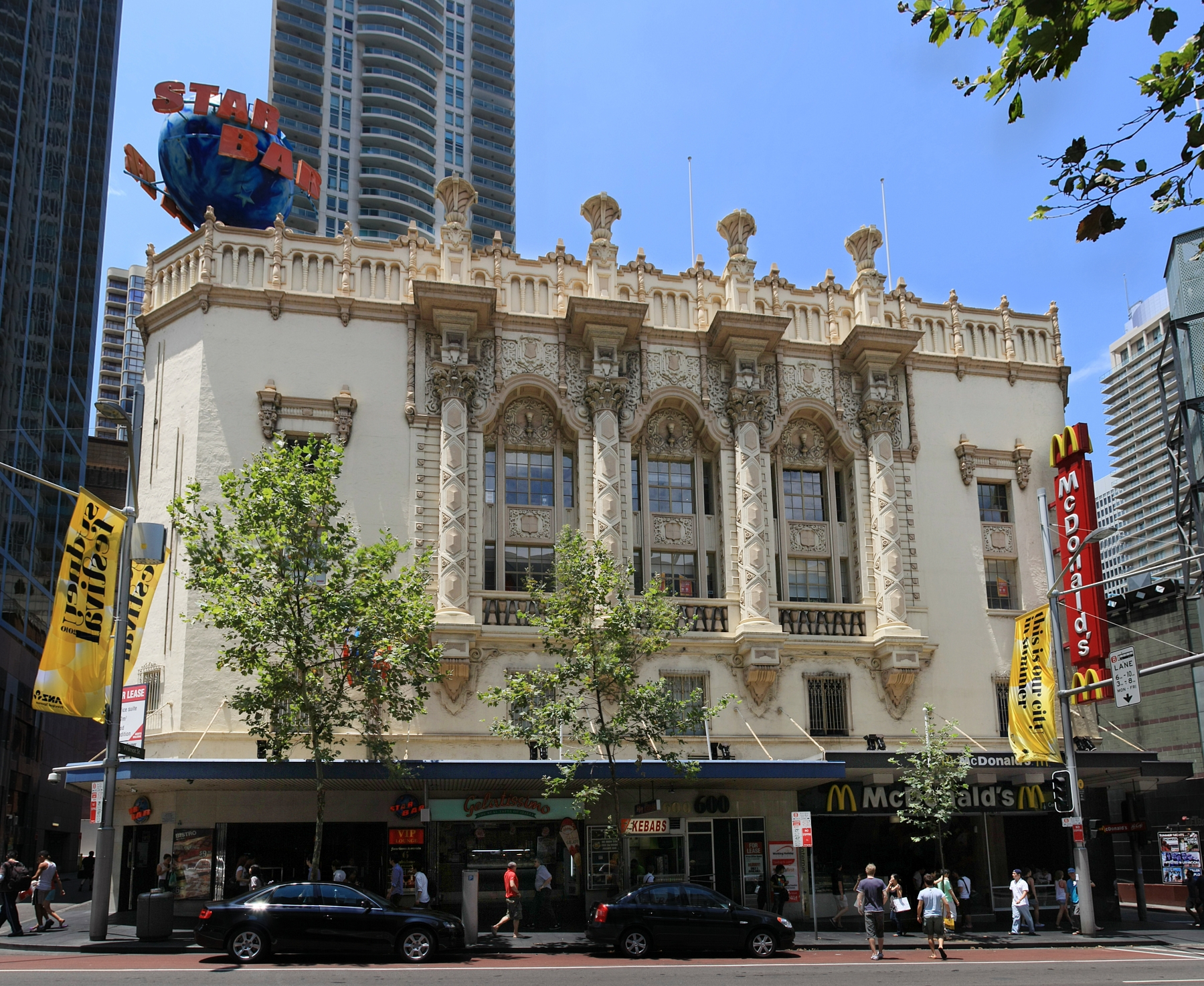
- Plaza Theatre, George Street, Sydney
- Born: 1893; Hay, New South Wales
- Died: 1952 (aged 58); Sydney
- Occupation: Architect
- Practice: Laurie & Heath (1932–1952)
- Buildings: Plaza Theatre; George Street, Sydney (1930)
- Design: Seventh-day Adventist Church Office, 738 Pacific Highway, Gordon (1940)

Eric Fergus Heath was born on 5 December 1893 at the Tattersall's Hotel Lachlan Street Hay. He did not live in Junee until April 1898 when he was 4 years old.when his father Edward Heath became the manager of the Railway refreshment rooms in Junee. . .

Eric Fergus Heath ( 5 December 1893 – 23 September 1952) was an Australian architect active in the second quarter of the 20th century. His work encompassed the numerous Australian architectural styles of the inter-war period and he was considered to be one of the finest draftsmen of his day.

== Family ==
Heath was born in Hay, New South Wales , to Edward and Euphemia (Effie) Heath. and grew up in Junee from the age of four. His brother Clive Patterson Heath (1895–1963), also an architect, was born the following year. Clive married Edna Jean Pritchard (1902–1968) in 1926. She graduated as a Bachelor of Architecture in 1924 and Clive graduated in 1925 and they lived in Manly, New South Wales. Clive and Edna lived and worked in Brisbane, Queensland in the late 1930s and early 1940s as architects, and then returned to Sydney.

== Early life ==
Eric Heath attended Newington College as a boarding student commencing in 1907. Heath was articled in architecture and studied at Sydney Technical College. In 1924 he married Edna Castle Graham and commenced private practice in 1926. An Ideal Cottage competition was arranged in 1926 by the organisers of the Ideal Homes Exhibition, and the adjudicators were Sir Charles Rosenthal, Alexander Speers, Dr Richard Arthur and Florence Taylor. Heath won the second prize of £50.

== Plaza Theatre ==
In 1930, Heath designed the Plaza Theatre (Sydney), a now heritage listed building designed as a 2000-seat cinema for the Hoyts Group. Today it is rare surviving example of central Sydney's inter-war building boom in theatre buildings. It is one of only three surviving theatre buildings in the city.

== Laurie and Heath ==
In 1932, Heath joined William Rae Laurie in a partnership known as Laurie & Heath. By 1936 the firm were designing houses in Turramurra, Killara, Wahroonga, Pymble, Gordon, Camden and Bathurst. In 1936 he designed Andover, 51 Warrangi Street Turramurra, a significant Georgian Revival house. In 1937 the partners designed Grazcos House, an office building, in Young Street, Sydney. Two years later the firm designed a classroom block for Abbotsleigh, a girls school in Wahroonga. Heath and Laurie remained partners until the beginning of World War II when Heath enlisted.
