= John Dawson (Australian politician) =

Australian politician and solicitor

John Dawson was an Australian politician and solicitor. He was one of Charles Cowper's 21 appointees to the New South Wales Legislative Council in May 1861, but never took his seat.
