= Rydges Hotels & Resorts =

Australian Hotel chain

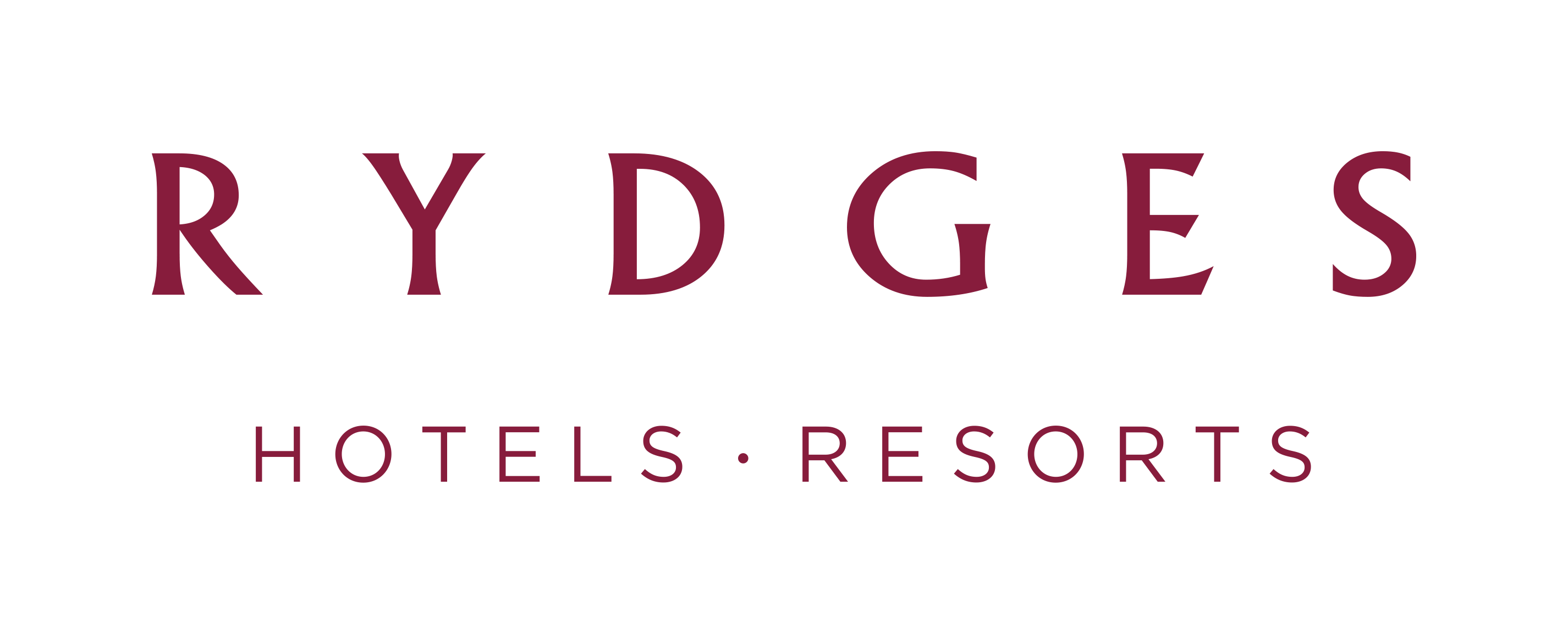
- Trade name: Rydges
- Company type: Subsidiary
- Industry: Hotel accommodation and hospitality
- Headquarters: Australia
- Revenue: ▼ A$26.5 million (FY2012)
- Parent: Event Hospitality and Entertainment
- Website: www.rydges.com

Rydges Hotels & Resorts, or Rydges, is a hotel accommodation and hospitality provider that operates in Australia and New Zealand. Rydges accommodates one million guests annually, across a range of market segments. Rydges is a subsidiary of the ASX-listed EVT Limited, a corporation that owns and operates brands in the entertainment, hospitality, and leisure sectors, mainly within Australasia.

== History ==
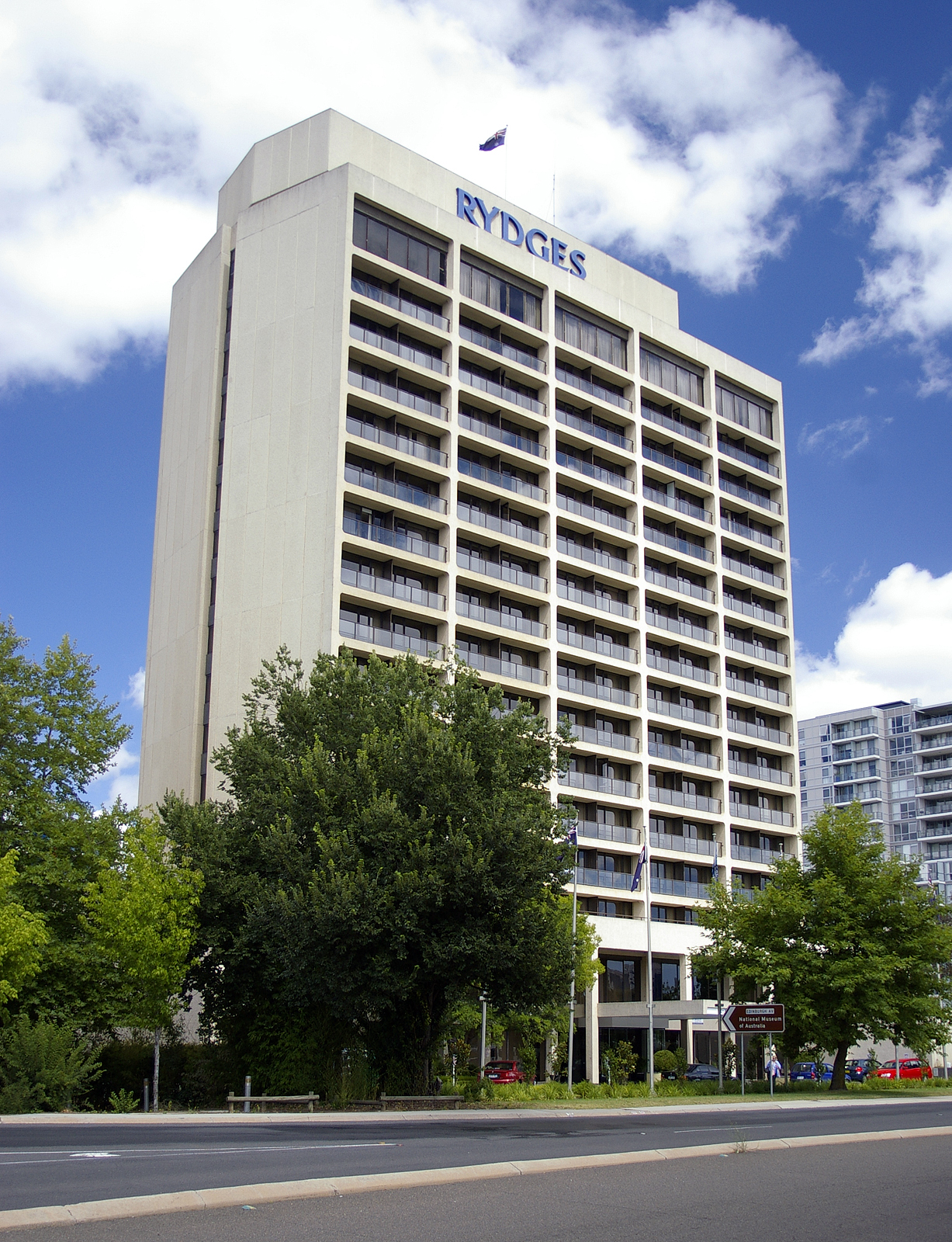
Rydges Lakeside (since transferred to QT Hotels & Resorts) in Canberra

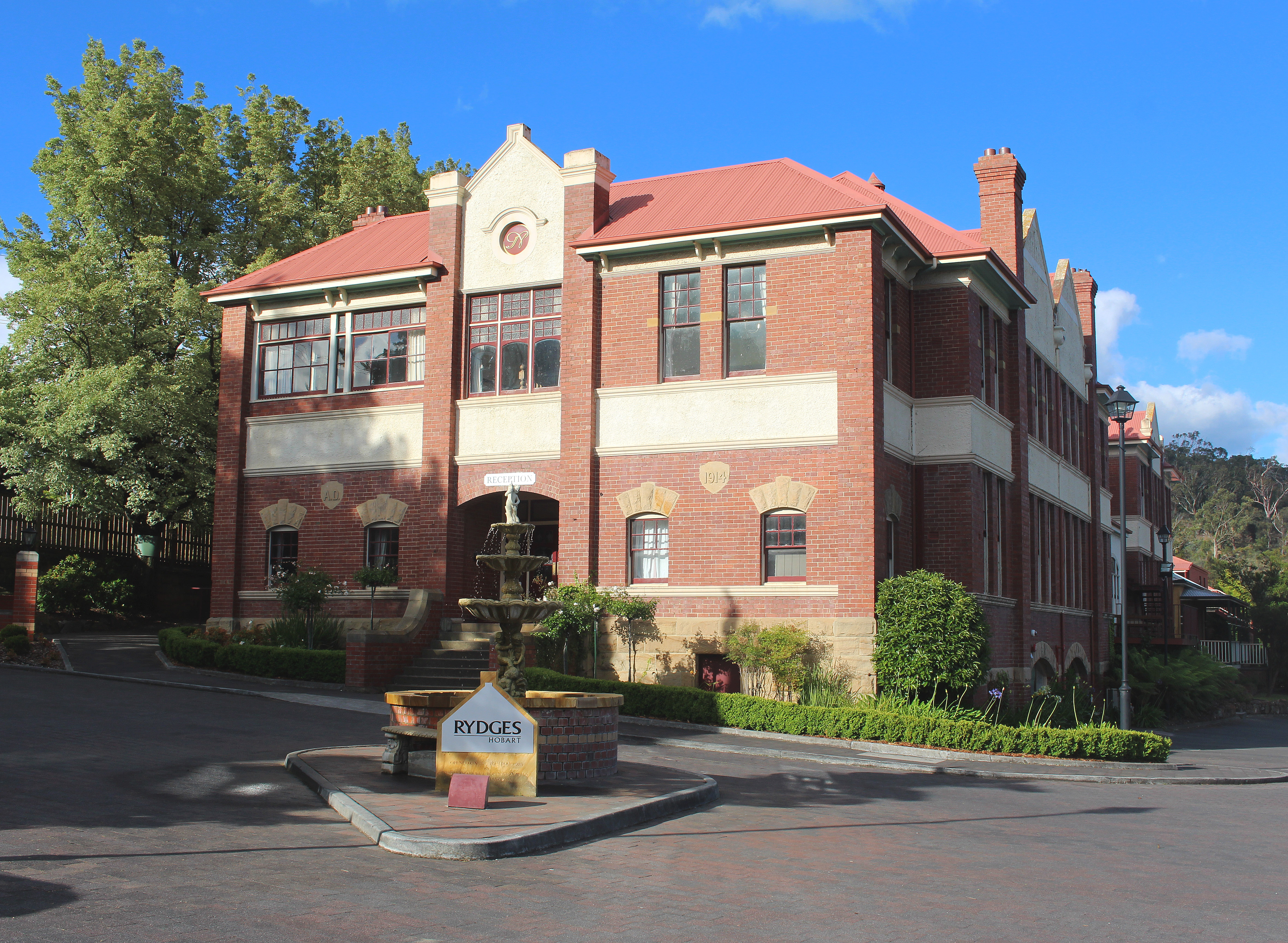
Rydges Hotel in Hobart

Between 1988 and 1995, Rydges grew from eight to twenty-six branded four-star hotels. In the early years, the individual character of the hotels was encouraged with a collection of logos and names designed to suit each location. The Rydges portfolio comprises a range of mid to upscale hotels that cater to corporate travelers in its city locations as well as the holidaymaker in the resort destinations. Over the past few years, Rydges has expanded its activities to Dubai in the United Arab Emirates, Doha in Qatar, London in the United Kingdom, as well as to Fiji in the South Pacific. Today, Rydges operates 7,400 rooms in 2 countries with 60 properties.

On 17 December 2020, Rydges Park Hotel in Carlton Melbourne began housing medivac refugees for the Australian Government, under a program described by lawyers as a program of "unlawful detention".

== Brands ==
Within the Rydges Hotels & Resorts division, brands have been established.

- Rydges Hotels & Resorts – comprises a range of mid to upscale hotels catering for both corporate travellers in its city locations, as well as the holidaymaker in the resort destinations.
- QT Hotels & Resorts
- Atura
- Thredbo Resort
- Jucy Snooze
- Event Cinemas
- Bell City – Officially opened on 1 August 2008, Bell City is Melbourne's largest multi-purpose accommodation and events facility. The A$120 million complex features 211 one and two-bed Manhattan-style studio apartments branded Rydges Residences, as well as a further 182 one and two-bed studio apartments operating as a 4.5 star Rydges Hotel.
  - Rydges Residences – the complex houses 211 apartments.
  - Sleep & Go – offers 87 cheaper rooms for travellers.
  - Le Student 8 – upmarket accommodation for students.
