= Acclimatisation Society gardens, Lawnton =

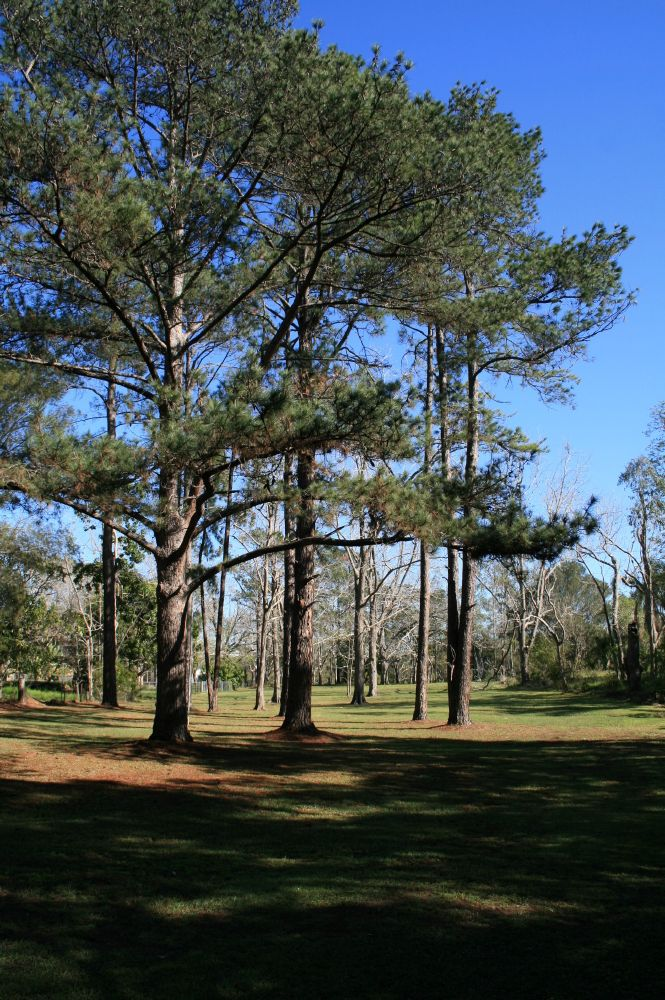
- Mature trees in the Acclimatisation Society gardens, 2007

- Location within Queensland Location within Australia
- 27.2723°S 152.9703°E
- Location: Bray Road, Lawnton, City of Moreton Bay, Queensland, Australia

Queensland Heritage Register
- Official name: Remnants of former acclimatisation society gardens at Lawnton
- Type: state heritage (landscape)
- Designated: 8 May 2009
- Reference no.: 602703
- Significant period: 1910s

Acclimatisation Society gardens is a heritage-listed botanic garden at Bray Road, Lawnton, City of Moreton Bay, Queensland, Australia. It was added to the Queensland Heritage Register on 8 May 2009.

== History ==
The remnant pecan nut grove in the former Queensland Acclimatisation Society Gardens at Lawnton, a residential suburb north of Brisbane in the then Shire of Pine (later rename Shire of Pine Rivers, Moreton Bay Region and City of Moreton Bay), contain a number of mature trees which are all that remain of a dense grove planted by the society between 1915 and World War II. They are dispersed around Stephen Lawn Park and a number of adjacent, privately owned properties.

Acclimatisation in the nineteenth century was scientifically understood to mean the process by which animals and plants gradually adapt to climatic and environmental conditions different to those that prevailed in their original habitats. The interest in acclimatisation derived from early theories that the environment could bring about evolutionary change in species. In Australia, however, scientific theory was not a primary motivation and acclimatisation came to represent simply the exchange of plants and animals with other countries.

Acclimatisation societies were established in all of the Australian colonies in the mid to late 19th century. These societies formed part of an international network of other acclimatisation societies and botanical gardens, including Kew in the United Kingdom, which exchanged plants and animals. Imported fauna and flora was kept in the societies' gardens and distributed to their subscribers and other interested parties. At times, exotic plants and animals were released into the wild.

From its inception in 1862 at the instigation of the Governor of Queensland, Sir George Bowen, the Queensland Acclimatisation Society focussed on contributing to the development of Queensland's fledgling agricultural industry. It imported plants that had commercial potential and conducted experiments to determine if they could be adapted to Queensland's tropical and sub-tropical climate. Plants researched included sugar cane, bananas, cotton, apples, pineapples, pasture grasses, maize, olives, mangoes, pecan nuts and macadamia nuts. Many of these became important agricultural crops in Queensland.

The society fulfilled a supporting role to the sugar industry from 1863. In that year, the Queensland Acclimatisation Society began importing cane from Mauritius and New Caledonia and distributing it to growers. Until well into the 20th century, they continued researching into the crop, importing and distributing new varieties and experimenting with propagating cane from seed and artificially cross- fertilising canes. They produced a popular variety of sugar cane, Q813, which was known for its resistance to disease and was still in use as late as 1926.

Before the establishment of the Department of Agriculture, the society acted as a government advisory body on agricultural matters. Until at least 1888, it was dependent on government funding and regarded itself to all intents and purposes as a government institution. The society contributed to the establishment of the Queensland Herbarium, the Kamerunga State Nursery, and the Queensland Forestry Department.

Between 1914 and 1915, the society closed its first gardens at Bowen Park and moved its operational base to a 100-acre property on the south bank of the North Pine River at Lawnton. The society had begun to lose Government support after the establishment of the Department of Agriculture in 1887 and this, together with the expansion of the adjoining National Association grounds (the present Brisbane Exhibition Grounds), meant that Bowen Park was no longer viable. No buildings associated with the Queensland Acclimatisation Society remain extant at the Bowen Park site.

The Lawnton site already contained an old house (no longer extant) on the banks of the river. This was raised and repaired. In March 1915, tenders were requested for the construction of a new cottage (extant but altered) including a "roomy office" for storing the society's books and papers. A tender for £306 was accepted and the cottage was completed by August 1915. During the 1920s, further structures were built including propagating houses, a tool house and a fumigating plant. Between 1935 and 1936, ornamental trees were planted along the entrance driveway.

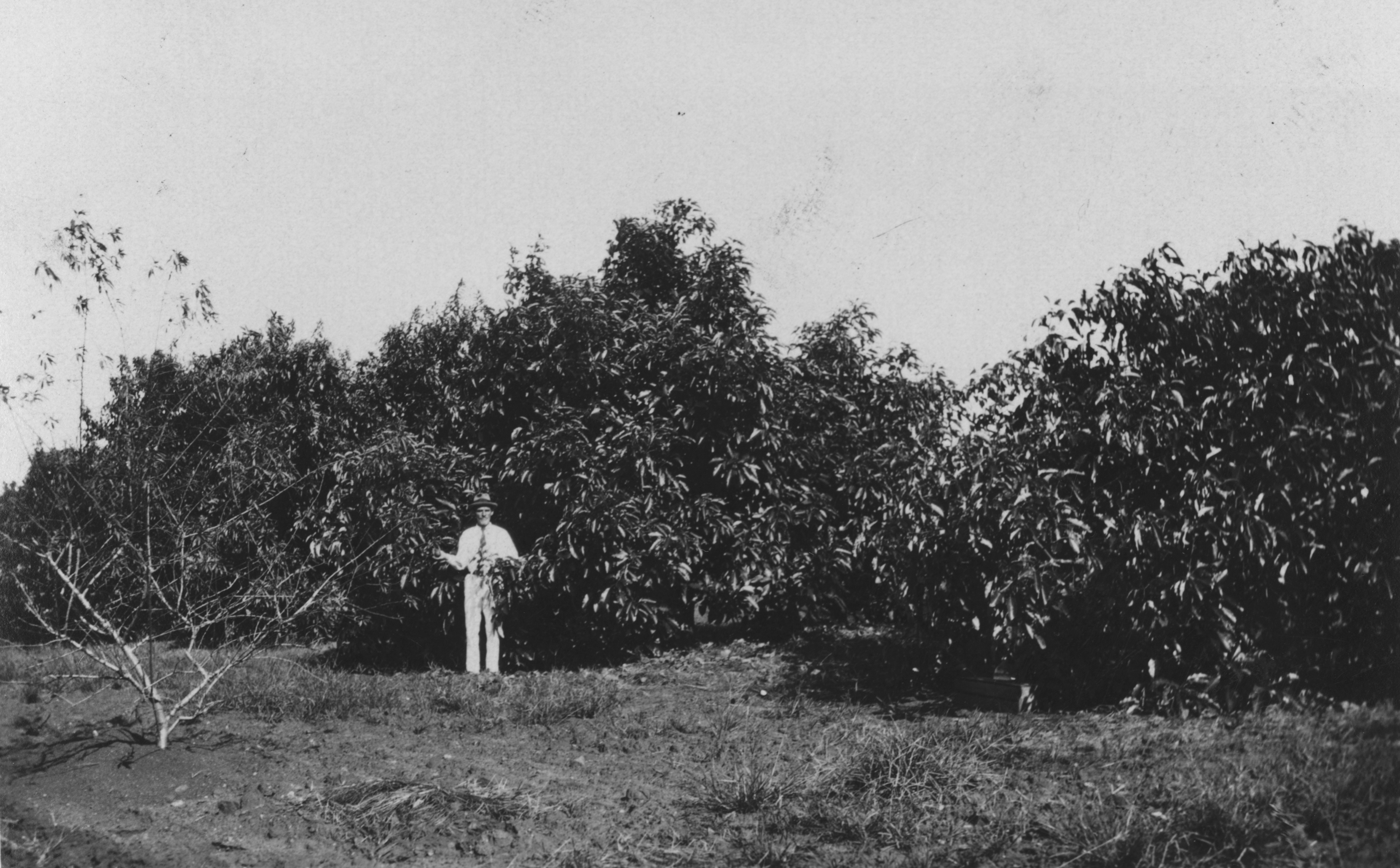
Avocado fruit trees, Queensland Acclimatisation Society, Lawnton

During some thirty years of operation at Lawnton, the society continued to assist Queensland's agricultural industry. In its research, the society worked with the Department of Agriculture and the Council for Scientific and Industrial Research (now the CSIRO). Plants introduced and researched at Lawnton included cotton, castor oil plants, avocados, pecan nuts, citrus fruits, macadamia nuts, custard apples, mangoes, pineapples, soy beans and fodder canes. The society contributed to making avocados, pecan nuts and grape fruit commercially viable crops in Queensland. The Allsopp variety of avocado, named after the society's overseer, was developed at the Lawnton gardens. The Pecan Nut grove was located at the northern end of the gardens on the present Bray Road. It was still flourishing when the gardens were sold.

Pecan nuts are now a commercial crop in Australia with in excess of 100 growers in Queensland, New South Wales and Western Australia. It is difficult to establish a direct link between the Acclimatisation society's work on pecan nuts and the present commercial crop. The society was probably only one of many organisations and individuals who contributed to the commercial development of the crop. However, the pecan nut trees at Lawnton are the only pre-World War II Acclimatisation Society plantings, known to be extant, that are related to commercial crops. They are therefore important in illustrating the society's work in supporting Queensland's agricultural industries.

The society sold its Lawnton gardens between 1941 and 1942 and moved to a ten-acre property at Redcliffe. This move was prompted by land degradation at Lawnton. The land was subsequently operated as a dairy farm until its subdivision for residential purposes commenced in 1959.

== Description ==
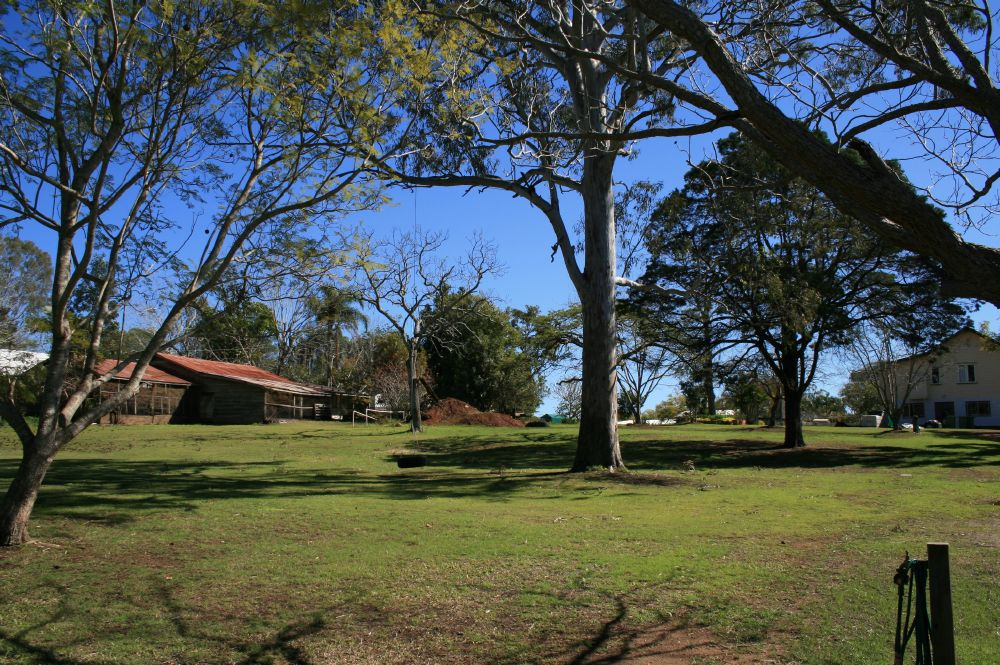
Remnants of the Acclimatisation Society gardens, 2007

Some 15 mature pecan trees (Carya sp) remain from the Acclimatisation Society plantings along the river flats of the North Pine River northeast of Bray Road, Lawnton. The pecan trees stand in Stephen Lawn Park and in the backyards of properties bounding the Park. Formed in distinct rows, six mature trees stand in the Park and a further nine trees stand in the backyards. There are a number of less mature trees scattered across the area that may have seeded from the original grove.

== Heritage listing ==
Remnants of former acclimatisation society gardens at Lawnton were listed on the Queensland Heritage Register on 8 May 2009 having satisfied the following criteria.

The place is important in demonstrating the evolution or pattern of Queensland's history.

The remnants of the pecan nut grove at the former Queensland Acclimatisation Society Gardens at Lawnton are physical evidence of the process of adaptation by the non-indigenous settler society to Queensland's environment during the late 19th and early 20th centuries. Acclimatisation societies experimented with adapting plants and animals from other countries to Australian conditions. The Queensland society focussed on finding and importing plants that could be adapted for use as commercial crops in Queensland's tropical and sub-tropical conditions.

The remnant grove is also evidence of an important aspect of the development of Queensland's agricultural industries. Through its work of adapting plants with commercial potential, the society made a notable contribution to these industries. As the only pre-World War II Acclimatisation Society plantings, known to be extant, that relate to commercial crops, the remnant grove is important in illustrating the society's early work in supporting Queensland's agricultural industries.

The place demonstrates rare, uncommon or endangered aspects of Queensland's cultural heritage.

The pecan nut trees are among only a few known extant trees at the sites of the Queensland Acclimatisation Society's pre-World War II gardens. The main focus of the society's activities was economic botany. Pecan nuts are now a commercial crop in Queensland and the trees at Lawnton constitute the only known plantings related to the society's pre-World War II work in economic botany. Remnant vegetation at Bowen Park, the site of the society's earlier gardens, is ornamental in nature.

The place has a special association with the life or work of a particular person, group or organisation of importance in Queensland's history.

The remnant grove has a special association with the work of the Queensland Acclimatisation Society, an organisation that made a notable contribution to the development of Queensland's agricultural industries. The pecan nut grove was an important component of its Lawnton gardens between 1915 and 1941.
