= St David's Anglican Church, Mossman =

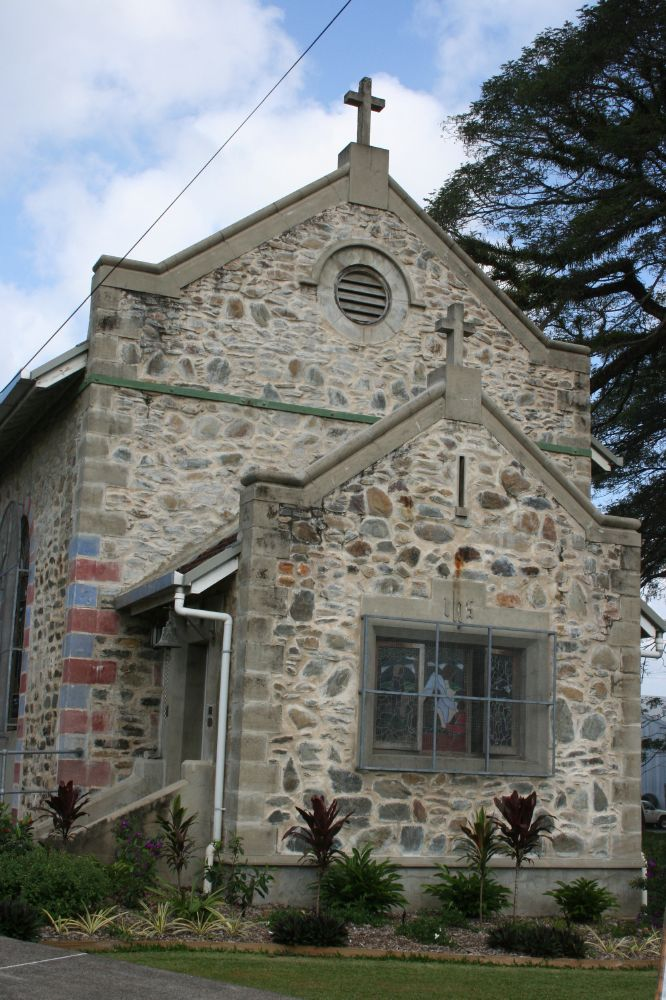
- St David's Anglican Church, Mossman, 2010

- Location within Queensland Location within Australia
- 16.4583°S 145.3731°E
- Location: 3 Foxton Avenue, Mossman, Shire of Douglas, Queensland, Australia

Site notes
- Architect(s): Edwin Roy Orchard, Edward Taffs
- Architectural style: Byzantine

Queensland Heritage Register
- Official name: St David's Anglican Church and Raintrees (Samanea saman)
- Type: state heritage (built)
- Designated: 6 August 2010
- Reference no.: 602760
- Significant period: 1912–1952

St David's Anglican Church is a heritage-listed church at 3 Foxton Avenue, Mossman, Shire of Douglas, Queensland, Australia. It was designed by Edward Taffs and Edwin Roy Orchard. It was added to the Queensland Heritage Register on 6 August 2010.

== History ==
St David's Church is a small stone and masonry building constructed in three stages between 1912 and 1952 to encompass a porch, nave and apsidal sanctuary, with a vestry and chapel added c. 1982. It replaced an earlier Anglican church on the same site, which was destroyed by a cyclone in March 1911. The original design, as influenced by the architectural traditions of the Byzantine Empire, was completed by the long-serving rector, Reverend Edward Taffs, who drove the project to fruition over the course of his career in charge of the Mossman/Port Douglas Parish of the Anglican Diocese of Carpentaria (1900–1996). The current church and its evocative setting behind an avenue of mature, fern-clad raintrees (Samanea saman) are situated to the north of the town centre, on the road to Daintree.

Mossman lies inland from Port Douglas, on the flood-plain of the Mossman River between the Great Dividing Range and the coast, about 70 kilometres (43 mi) north of Cairns. George Elphinstone Dalrymple's North-East Coast Exploring Expedition of late 1873 had brought attention to the resources around the Johnstone, Mulgrave, Russell, Daintree and Mossman Rivers and from 1874 cedar stands on the later were being logged extensively. Behind the coastal river plain the Hodgkinson goldfield was proclaimed on 15 June 1876. Initially accessed via Cairns, in 1877 an alternative route to the coast was found and Port Douglas was established as the field's new port, about four miles south of the mouth of the Mossman River.

By 1878 the most readily accessible cedar stands in the Mossman River district had been exhausted, although logging in more difficult-to-reach areas continued into the 1880s. Agricultural settlers followed the timber getters from the late 1870s, one of the earliest on the Mossman being Daniel Hart, an immigrant from Jamaica and a former timber getter. In 1878 he selected land along the river, calling the property Coolshade, and in 1885 subdivided part of it, which became the western half of the town of Mossman. The town was first called Hartsville in his honour.

Excessive rain and poor soil productivity resulted in most of the region being planted out with sugarcane from the 1880s. In 1883, Brie Brie Sugar Plantation established Mossman's first mill but this was unsuccessful and largely inoperative by 1886. This did not deter Commissioner WO Hodgkinson from assessing the flat land around the Mossman River as having great potential for cane production during his investigation of sites for central sugar mills conducted in 1886. The impetus for more extensive sugar cropping in the district came with the establishment of the Mossman Central Co-operative Mill in the mid- 1890s under the provisions of the 1893 Sugar Works Guarantee Act.

As the Mossman River community consolidated, religious denominations established a presence in the district. Prior to the formation of a separate Port Douglas and Mossman Parish, missionary chaplains from the Church of England's Diocese of North Queensland, based in Townsville, travelled to Port Douglas to conduct services. In 1898 the separate parish was created after parishioners subscribed £100 per year to support a minister. A church was built in Mossman on land that had been part of Daniel Hart's 1885 subdivision (and part of which he donated to the church in 1898).

The first St David's Church at Mossman was a simple gable-roofed timber structure, dedicated on Trinity Sunday on 29 May 1899. It took the name of the Welsh patron saint, St David, reputedly because Mr RD Rex, a local farmer and parish secretary during construction had been christened in the new cathedral of St David's in Hobart in 1874. The Bishop of North Queensland agreed to the name. The link with the Tasmanian cathedral was again made in 1955 when a fragment of the stone cross at St David's Cathedral was presented to the Mossman church, where it was set in cement at the entry.

From 3 August 1900 the Port Douglas and Mossman Parish was incorporated into the newly created Church of England Diocese of Carpentaria, which encompassed the Torres Strait, Cape York Peninsula, the Southern Gulf of Carpentaria and the whole of the Northern Territory, with the Bishop's seat located at Thursday Island. The Queensland boundary of the diocese extended to south of Port Douglas, with Cairns remaining in the Diocese of North Queensland. Church historians, including Keith Rayner is his 1962 doctoral thesis The History of the Church of England in Queensland, argue that the formation of a new diocese "came at a time of economic and commercial depression, and [when] its European population was markedly declining." The new diocese faced significant challenges due to its size, isolation, lack of resources and the cultural and linguistic diversity of its parishioners. It struggled to be self-supporting, and lacked sufficient internal support to accomplish its missionary goals.

Despite these challenges, the Port Douglas and Mossman Parish initially thrived. In January 1902 The Carpentarian noted that the church had resolved to raise £150 for a rectory at St David's, which was constructed in 1903; and in 1904 Mossman became the centre of the parish. The shift away from Port Douglas reflected the decline of the latter as an early port and regional centre, the ascendancy of Cairns as the region's premier port, and the emergence of Mossman as the centre of the Mossman River district.

In 1904 the Reverend Edward Taffs took up duties as rector at Mossman and remained there for the next 46 years until his death aged 90. Taffs had migrated from England to Victoria in September 1889 and was ordained a minister in St Paul's Cathedral in Melbourne in 1901; his first appointment being in South Gippsland. He opened the Holy Trinity College at Kew, occupying the position of headmaster while continuing as a minister. In mid-1904 he left Victoria with his family and moved to Mossman to take up the position of rector. He and his wife Mary worked throughout the parish, travelling to Mount Molloy, Mount Carbine and Port Douglas on horseback. Taffs' time in Mossman was an unusually long commitment for an Anglican clergyman at this period in such a remote part of the state. His missionary commitment and principles, as well as his dogged determination, were pivotal to the development and construction of the second St David's Church.

On 16 March 1911 a severe cyclone caused extensive damage to buildings at Port Douglas and Mossman. The Carpentarian of Easter Eve 1911 reported that the facilities lost included the churches at Port Douglas and Mossman, the Port Douglas house belonging to the Bishopric Endowment Fund (used as a rectory), a church hall at Mossman that Taffs had erected at his own expense, and a small church at Mount Molloy. A flood two weeks after the cyclone swept away the remaining debris.

The paucity of church finances, often reliant upon contributions from English church societies, meant that raising funds for building projects was a constant challenge. For the Parish of Port Douglas and Mossman, available funding was first directed toward re-erecting the Mossman parish hall. Prolonged difficulties in raising further funds, and a commitment to building a new church debt-free, resulted in this hall serving as the temporary church until 1952.

The impact of the 1911 cyclone convinced local parishioners of the need to rebuild St David's in stone, a more expensive undertaking than erecting a timber structure. Reverend Taffs reputedly prepared the design for the new church which, in contrast to the simple, gabled timber churches that dominated the area, drew from the architectural traditions of the Byzantine Empire or that of the Romans during the Middle Ages. The culmination of Early Christian architecture, the style that came to be associated with this empire began after AD 330 when Emperor Constantine established the Imperial Roman capital at Byzantium, renaming it Constantinople. From its palette the design for St David's originally incorporated a series of domes and barrel vaults over the nave and apse, a dome on a windowed drum, and rounded arches of coloured stone. The planned church was modest in size - 44 feet (13 m) long by 25 feet (7.6 m) wide - and designed to seat 120 persons. Construction commenced in 1912 after suitable stone was found at Bonnie Doon, a local cane farm on the Mossman River. Kerr reports in his Northern Outpost report of 1995 that stones were transported from the property with the help of the Mossman Mill which agreed to supply half a mile of tramline to enable it to be hauled from the quarry to the construction site. A contract for the nave stone was let for 850 tons at three shillings a ton and Mossman Central Mill railed it to the church site. To withstand potential flooding, substantial foundations were laid by parishioners under the supervision of a stonemason. These were completed in 1915, but further work was delayed by World War I (1914–1918). A decoratively painted timber panel intended for the sanctuary was crafted during this time for use in the temporary church and later transferred to the stone building.

After the war the Ladies Building Committee raised money for construction of the chancel and one bay window in 1919, but further obstacles slowed the building program. The price of cement escalated and then in February 1920 another cyclone damaged the rectory and temporary church, and building funds set aside for the new church had to be channeled into repair of the temporary church/hall and rectory.

During the 1920s, fund raising waned and in the early 1930s progress remained slow due to the depressed economy. Concerted efforts to complete the church did not resume until the late 1930s after modifications to the plan were made by firms of architects and engineers, Hassall and Redmond, both of Cairns, who called tenders in January 1937. As the prices submitted were more costly than the committee had anticipated, construction of the stone walls did not commence until 1940, with most of the work undertaken by Reverend Taffs and his two grandsons. Further delay followed while funds were raised for the roof. With the start of World War II (1939–1945), voluntary fund-raising, building materials and skilled labour were diverted to the war effort, delaying construction even further.

Reverend Taffs died in 1950, just two years before St David's Church was completed. His replacement, Father Ware, considered that his first task was to complete the church. In 1951 the design was revised by Cairns architect Edwin Roy Orchard to incorporate a simpler and less expensive gabled roof and parishioners arranged a loan with the National Bank. Tenders were called in October 1951 and the contract was awarded to Baker and McMaster of Cairns. The work cost £7,586 and was completed in August 1952. On 27 September 1952 Bishop Hudson finally dedicated the stone church, 40 years after construction had commenced.

St David's Church suffered structural damage to its sanctuary during a cyclonic storm in 1979. In the same year a building fund was established to construct a vestry. In 1980 a cruciform design was accepted, with small transepts to accommodate a vestry to the north and a chapel to the south of the crossing.

The tender was awarded to R and J Carroll in 1982. The new chapel and vestry were consecrated in 1984, completing the building that was started in 1912 under the guidance of Rev. Taffs. Parishioners have since installed leadlight windows designed by artist Chris Oswald (donated in memory of Dorothy Louise Kieseker) and a tile mosaic depicting the risen Christ.

In 1996 the Diocese of Carpentaria was dissolved and the Parish of Port Douglas and Mossman, among other Cape York parishes, was returned to the responsibility of the Anglican Diocese of North Queensland.

=== Raintrees (Samanea saman) ===
An avenue comprising about eleven mature raintrees grows either side of Foxton Avenue (the Cook Highway) from its intersection with Mossman Street to the church porch. This avenue contributes substantially to the setting of St David's and the aesthetic experience of it, which is considered to be of State-level cultural heritage significance.

The raintree is native to a range stretching from southern Mexico into northern South America and its accepted botanical name, as included in the Australian Plant Census and established in 1916, is Samanea saman (Jacq.) Merr. A plaque outside St David's states that the avenue of trees was planted by Rev. Taffs using seeds obtained from Jamaica by Daniel Hart, one of the area's earliest selectors to whom the land (portion 35) originally belonged; however no evidence has been uncovered to substantiate this account or resolve the incongruity it contains between the year of Hart's death, 1900, and when Taffs become rector at Mossman in 1904. A recent arborist's report estimates the trees are between 80 and 100 years old making the date range in which they were planted between 1908 and 1928. No trees appear in a parish photograph of the timber church destroyed by cyclone in 1911 and apparently built on the site of the later stone church.

The first record of the raintree species being introduced outside its native habitat comes from the Caribbean Islands, and since then it has become naturalized and widely planted in pastureland for shade and forage on most of these islands, including Jamaica from where Hart immigrated to Australia. In the second half of the nineteenth century the trees were introduced into many tropical countries as street and shade trees, most extensively in India, southern Asia and the Pacific. The species has been known by a number of other common names including guango (in Jamaica), monkey pod and saman.

Raintrees are now common in coastal north-east Queensland, including around Mossman and Port Douglas. Flora of Australia (2001) reports that the trees are naturalized along the Stewart Creek south of Daintree, about 24 kilometres (15 mi) north of Mossman, with other naturalized populations occurring at South Johnstone and Dingo Beach on Cape Gloucester (near Bowen). A mature tree (estimated to be 125 years old) has been identified near the weighbridge on Mossman's Mill Road. In 1907 they were reported as growing in the main street of Ingham and in Townsville. At the opening of the Cook Highway from Cairns to Mossman in late 1933, The Courier Mail of 19 December 1933 described already established raintrees lining part of the Port Douglas to Mossman stretch of the road.

The key to the early renown of the raintree stemmed from the apocryphal story that it was a panacea for drought-stricken districts through the ability of its leaves to condense moisture out of the air, retain it in large quantities and then expel it through its leaves and trunk. This story, and how it had been disproved, was discussed in two 1911 articles from the Port Douglas and Mossman Record. Otherwise it was seriously considered as a useful crop for the fodder its large seed pods provided for cattle.

It appears that in late nineteenth century Queensland the raintree was known by one of its botanical synonyms, an alternate spelling of Pithecellobium saman. In an August 1879 article in The Queenslander, recounting the minutes of the most recent meeting of the Acclimatisation Society of Queensland, this species is discussed and a report tabled from the director of the Botanical Gardens in Jamaica, from where seeds had been obtained by the Queensland Colonial Office. The Chairman reported that the tree was known to the Society, which had a few strong plants in stock. Later in the same year it was reported that the chairman had distributed large quantities of seed in the northern districts of the colony. A letter-to-the-editor published in a June 1884 Sydney Morning Herald issue and received from Fred Turner - who worked at the Brisbane Botanic Gardens from 1874, before becoming Curator of the Acclimatisation Society's Bowen Park and then moving to the Sydney Botanic Gardens in 1880 - reveals that the Brisbane Gardens had sometime previously received seeds of the raintree. An article in a December 1932 issue of The Queenslander describes a substantial raintree growing there.

From late 1877 Hart was an active member of the Queensland Acclimatisation Society, based in Brisbane, and at Coolshade he established a fine orchard with European and Mediterranean fruits, Chinese fruits, mangoes, and coconuts using material obtained almost exclusively via the Society. In April 1884 The Brisbane Courier reported on a visit to agricultural properties in the Mossman River district, the foremost of which was Coolshade. In December 1887 the agricultural reporter for The Queenslander newspaper described Hart as an enthusiast in horticulture, and his garden an experimental station. In both articles the extensive range of plants described as growing at the property did not include the raintree.

When Hart died in 1900 he left Coolshade and its orchard - located on just over 10 acres (4.12ha) on the Mossman River to the north of the site of St David's and the raintree avenue - to his half brother. In 1907 the title for the triangular parcel of land over which the canopy of the eastern line of raintrees spreads was transferred by this brother to Edward Taffs, Hart's brother died in 1915, leaving Coolshade to a daughter of Taffs.

== Description ==
St David's Church is located north of the centre of Mossman in a park setting on a triangular site between the Captain Cook Highway (Foxton Avenue), which it addresses, and Mossman Street. It is set approximately four metres back from the street and is aligned at an angle of approximately 60° to the course of the street. When approached from the south and the centre of town it sits at the northern end of a grassed area behind an avenue of large, mature raintrees (Samanea saman) that dominate this section of Foxton Avenue.

From the church looking west there are views over George Davis Park with cane fields behind, and distant views of the Main Coast Range (part of the Great Dividing Range) and the Daintree National Park. The church behind the avenue of raintrees is an important aspect of the view from George Davis Park.

St. David's is a small church with a terracotta tile-clad roof and walls built of stone, concrete blockwork and detail sections of render. It is aligned on an east–west axis with a nave and small porch at the front and western end, a chapel and vestry to the south and north sides of the crossing respectively, and an apse on the eastern end of the nave.

The four stages in which the church was constructed are discernable in differences in its fabric. The fabric of the first three stages is critical to the cultural heritage significance of the church, while the fourth stage is important for its form but not for the materials used.

The first stage of construction is represented in the stonework up to floor level in the nave and apse, comprising random rubble to about one metre above ground level.

The second stage comprises the walls of the nave and apse above floor level, including the rounded archways and the coloured concrete block quoins, and reflects the Byzantine influence in the original design. The walls of the nave are approximately 8 metres (26 ft) high and it is approximately 12 metres (39 ft) long by 6 metres (20 ft) wide. There are four round arch openings on the exterior elevations of the nave: two on the north elevation and two on the south elevation. The round arch openings near the porch are about 1.5 metres (4 ft 11 in) wide. The eastern arched openings are much wider - about four metres. The polygonal apse begins in a round arched opening almost the width and height of the east wall of the nave. The apse has narrower round arch openings taking up most of each of the five sides. The walls of the nave and apse are constructed of random rubble. There are alternating red and blue coloured concrete block quoins to the corners and the edges of the arched openings.

The third stage comprises the porch, including the west gable parapet wall surmounted by a Latin cross at its apex, the gable parapet wall to the nave also with a Latin cross, and the tiled roofs of the nave, apse and porch. The porch is to the west of the nave, its walls also constructed of random rubble with uncoloured concrete block quoins. The western porch facade has a rectangular window with three lights, the outer casements of which open outwards while the central light is fixed. There is a narrow, upright slit in the stone wall above the window. The western facade of the nave has a circular window in-filled with fixed louvers and topped by a stone drip moulding. Both gable parapets have moulded block-work coping. The northern elevation of the porch features a doorway now accessed by a ramp with a bell mounted to the right-hand side of the doorway that is framed in bevelled concrete.

The roofs of the nave and porch are gabled, pitched at a 45? angle and have ridges running east–west. The roof of the apse abuts the wall of the nave and has a three-faceted hip. All roofs are clad with terracotta tiles.

The fourth construction stage corresponds to the additions undertaken in c. 1982 that installed a chapel centred on the southern side of the crossing and a vestry on its northern side. The walls of these additions are constructed of concrete block: rendered quoins and infill panels of textured blocks. The roofs of the chapel and vestry abut the wall of the nave, have three-faceted hips at each end, and are clad with coloured concrete tiles. Each of the three facets of the chapel southernmost end has a narrow window with rounded top. On the northern side the c. 1982 vestry addition mirrors that of the chapel opposite. Like the chapel the vestry has windows in the three of the end wall facets. There is a door in its western facade.

A small building housing toilets is immediately adjacent to the northeast corner of the nave.

Random rubble stonework is largely exposed on the interior of the church, as are the blockwork quoins. The porch, nave and apse have unpainted timber ceilings. There are panels of painted timber under the window sills in the apse.

The porch (4 by 2 metres (13.1 ft × 6.6 ft) x 3 metres (9.8 ft) high) has a carpeted floor, unpainted, rendered walls and a stained timber ceiling. The window in the northern wall of the porch has stained glass depicting a scene of Christ and children. The concrete frame above this window features the Christogram IHS (derived from the first three letters of the Greek name of Jesus).

The nave has concrete floors and a ceiling of stained timber panelling with six pendant light fittings and two fans hanging from it. The windows in the round-arch openings on the southern side of the nave contain stained glass depicting the Madonna and Child flanked by St Margaret and St Hilda. On the northern side Christ is depicted as a shepherd, flanked by St Andrew and St David. Between these windows and the arches leading into the chapel and vestry the stonework has been rendered.

The archways between the nave and chapel and vestry either side of the crossing are in-filled with stained timber boarding, to the south to the spring-line of the arch and to the north to door head height. The chapel is open to the main body of the church and its ceiling corresponds to the lower line of the in-fill panel, while the vestry is separated by a stained timber panel wall and a central door. The chapel and vestry have concrete floors, unpainted concrete block walls and stained timber ceilings.

Two concrete steps lead through a wide round-headed arch at the east end of the nave to the apse, which has unfinished random rubble walls and timber paneled ceiling similar to the nave. The concrete floor is covered with red carpet. There is a mosaic depicting Christ in the archway directly behind the altar.

=== Raintrees (Samanea saman) ===
An avenue of raintrees (Samanea saman) is located along a section of Foxton Avenue (Captain Cook Highway) to the south and west of the church. Six are located on the eastern side of the road with another five on the western side, and make an emotive setting for St David's Church particularly on the approach out of the centre of town to the south. The interlocking canopies that stretch over the road create a tunnel of shade beyond which stands the church in the sunlight. The large volume of space protected by this canopy stands above a carpet of grass on the triangular lot between Foxton Avenue and Mossman Street, and effect which also highlights the positioning of the church.

Samanea saman generally grow to between 15 and 25 metres (49 and 82 ft) tall with a broad dome-shaped canopy typically 30 metres (98 ft) in diameter. The trees leading to St David's Church are substantial and mature; some about 15 metres (49 ft) tall with canopies of about 30 metres (98 ft) in diameter. Some of the trees have multiple trunks, the circumferences of which being between 6 and 10 metres (20 and 33 ft). Ferns and other epiphytes grow from the trunk and branches of several trees.

== Heritage listing ==
St David's Anglican Church and Raintrees (Samanea saman) was listed on the Queensland Heritage Register on 6 August 2010 having satisfied the following criteria.

The place is important in demonstrating the evolution or pattern of Queensland's history.

St David's Church, constructed in stages between 1912 and 1952, is important in demonstrating the pattern of Queensland's history related to the spread of the Anglican Christian denomination. The lengthy construction period combined with the perseverance and dedication of the local minister, Reverend Taffs, exemplifies the pattern of the development, establishment and resilience of the former Anglican Diocese of Carpentaria (1900–1996) in far northern Queensland. The church embodies its ongoing struggle to establish a presence and raise funds for building projects during the first half of the twentieth century. Also the self-reliance that many ministers and their parishioners displayed is reflected in the idiosyncratic nature of the design and materials of St David's Church at Mossman.

The place is important because of its aesthetic significance.

St David's Anglican Church is set behind an avenue of substantial, fern-clad raintrees (Samanea saman) forming an archway along part of the Captain Cook Highway (Foxton Avenue) that takes road travellers out of the centre of Mossman toward Daintree. These trees and the beautiful arbour they make, as well as the unusual use of stone and Byzantine-influenced design details in the church, make an important aesthetic contribution to the town of Mossman.
