= Floriana, Cairns =

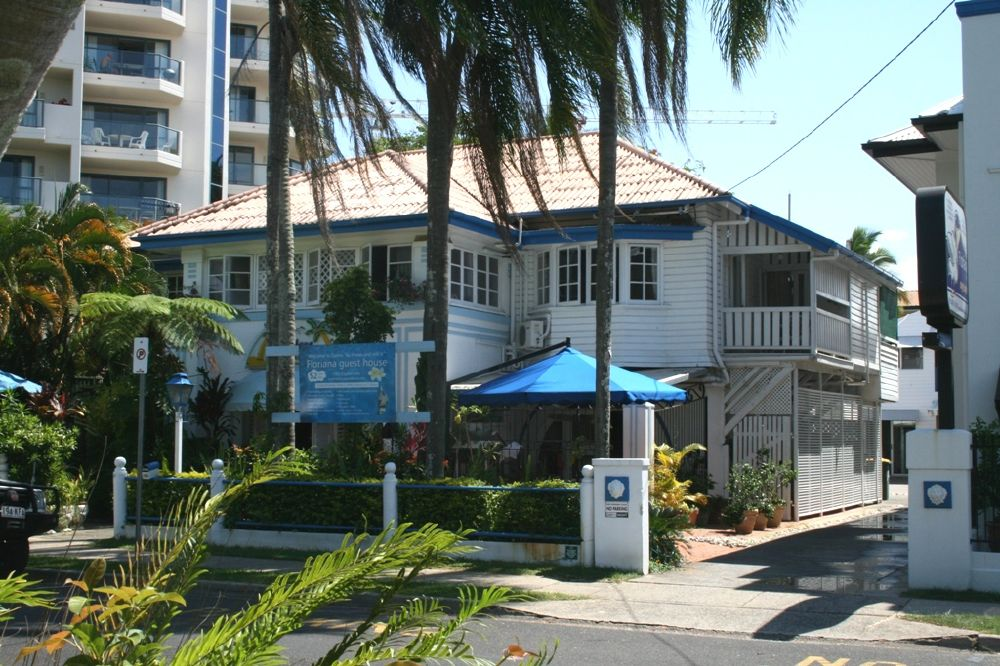
- Front elevation, Floriana, 2009

- Location within Queensland Location within Australia
- 16.9108°S 145.767°E
- Location: 183–185 The Esplanade, Cairns North, Cairns, Cairns Region, Queensland, Australia

History
- Design period: 1919–1930s (interwar period)
- Built: 1939

Site notes
- Architect: Edwin Roy Orchard

Queensland Heritage Register
- Official name: Floriana
- Type: state heritage (built)
- Designated: 30 April 2010
- Reference no.: 602738
- Significant period: 1939–
- Significant components: residential accommodation – flat/s, ballroom, other – residential: component

Floriana is a heritage-listed former private home and now guesthouse at 183–185 The Esplanade, Cairns North, Cairns, Cairns Region, Queensland, Australia. It was designed by Edwin Roy Orchard and built in 1939. It was added to the Queensland Heritage Register on 30 April 2010.

== History ==
Floriana at 183 The Esplanade, Cairns North (now known as Floriana Guesthouse) is the former city residence of Maltese migrants Paul and Paulina Zammit and their family. The two-storey rendered brick and chamferboard house was constructed in 1939 and originally comprised five bedrooms, a sitting room, dining room and kitchen on the upper floor; and a bathroom on each level; with the whole of the ground floor occupied as a large ballroom, which was converted into two flats and an entrance foyer in the late 1940s. Aspects of its design related to the prominent, central entry with a wide bay projection above and the building's address to the street were influenced by traditional Maltese housing. It stands adjacent to a set of Spanish Mission-style flats, also built by Zammit only a few years previous employing the same architect, Edwin Roy Orchard, and establishing a proud presence on the Cairns Esplanade.

Paulus Franciscus Michael Antonius Zammit was born in Birkirkara, Malta c. 1889. About 1911, at the age of 22, he married 19 year old Paulina Modesta Angela Aquiline from the same town. This small British Crown colony in the Mediterranean Sea had prospered through the nineteenth century, its population expanding but its economy dependent on British military spending, particularly in the development of the port at the capital Valletta. When military funding ceased in 1907 unemployment and poverty ensued. The Daily Malta Chronicle, which became the vehicle for discussion on emigration due to a lack of government action, campaigned for an emigration program and promoted Australia as a land of opportunity.

An earlier attempt at organised migration from Malta to Queensland in 1883, when 69 labourers were sent to the cane fields of the lower Burdekin River, had not proven successful. Overcrowding of the ship Nuddea and subsequent dissatisfaction with working conditions on the cane farms had deterred further emigration until the early twentieth century, when the Maltese government, unable to fund an emigration scheme, nonetheless concluded that its people would be welcomed by the Australian Government in solving the problem of labour shortages in its developing northern territories. Between 1905 and 1919, 2248 Maltese arrived in the southern states, many of whom moved north.

Paul Zammit immigrated to Australia in 1912 in the early phase of its renewal, ahead of his wife. He arrived in Melbourne in April and travelled on to Sydney before heading to North Queensland, where he worked in the Chillagoe mines and then cutting cane near the coast, before settling in Mooliba near Bartle Frere around 1919.

Paulina Zammit had arrived in Queensland by December 1913, with the couple's first child. Over the following 20 years they had nine more children, all born in Queensland. The Post Office Directories list the Zammits as farmers at Mooliba (later known as Pawngilly, now as Mirriwinni) from 1919, and nearby Bartle Frere from 1927. When the Bartle Frere State School opened in 1922, the elder children were on the attendance record and Paul Zammit was on the school committee. All of the Zammit children attended this school, the youngest being enrolled in 1936. Once established in Queensland, Zammit used his growing prosperity to support numerous migrants from Italy and Malta, either through sponsorship or provision of various forms of assistance. From 1919 to 1929 just over 3000 Maltese men immigrated to Australia. The Orvieto, the first ship carrying Maltese migrants here following the end of World War I, arrived in 1920 reuniting a number of pioneering families in the Mackay and Innisfail areas. One such man was Joe Brincat who was later given employment by Paul Zammit cutting cane at Babinda, having initially worked at the Chillagoe smelters, as Zammit had done when he first arrived in Queensland. Family information has indicated that at least five other families were sponsored and assisted by Zammit over the course of his life.

Zammit's success and his community efforts were being recognised widely. In 1933 a branch of the Maltese Farmers and Settlers Association was formed in North Queensland during a visit from Dr Charles Mattel, a former AIF medical officer who was touring Queensland, meeting with Maltese migrants, forming the association, and drawing attention to the fact that the Maltese were law-abiding British citizens after the unrest that occurred in the wake of the 1927 strike at the South Johnstone Sugar Mill. During his Cairns visit Dr Mattel noted that Paul Zammit of Bartle Frere was one of the most successful sugar farmers in North Queensland, with property reputedly worth £65,000. In the 1934 Australia Day Address given by the Maltese Commission for Labour, Captain Henri Curmi, in Malta, his achievements were cited as a source of inspiration to prospective Maltese emigrants. He was further praised by the Roman Catholic Bishop of Cairns, Bishop John Heavey, at a 1936 function held at the Catholic Club Rooms in Babinda, where Paul was the president, for the work the family had done for the church in the region both financially and in facilitating pride in Maltese heritage. At this time he was also Far North President of the organisation that produced bi-lingual The Voice of the Maltese in Australia and Farmers' Advocate Weekly.

Paul Zammit had begun investing in residential property in Cairns, although the family was still resident on their Bartle Frere cane farm. In December 1932 two parcels of land at 183 and 185 The Esplanade (which included the later site of Floriana) were transferred to Paulina Zammit. These blocks were located on one of Cairns' premier streets, overlooking Trinity Inlet. According to family information, in 1934 the Zammits built the Spanish Mission-style flats, designed by former Sydney architect Edwin Roy Orchard, which are still located at 185 The Esplanade today. In mid-1935 they acquired 67 The Esplanade (later the site of the Continental Hotel, which Zammit also built). They also acquired another block of flats on The Esplanade in about 1935 (later known as Hayles Flats but no longer extant).

In October 1938 Orchard completed plans for a city residence for the Zammit family, which was to be built at 183 The Esplanade, adjacent to the c. 1934 flats. Orchard was an established Sydney North Shore architect who is credited with designing the earliest Californian Bungalow-influenced houses in New South Wales between 1913 and 1915 (three of his Sydney designs have been entered in the New South Wales State Heritage Register). He relocated to Mareeba during the Depression and was involved in the tobacco industry until 1933, when he established an architectural practice in Cairns. He registered with the Queensland Chapter of the Royal Society of Architects in 1936. Orchard's other projects in the Cairns region included: Tobruk Memorial Pool (in partnership with Jack McElroy), St David's Anglican Church at Mossman, motor showrooms and a hotel in Atherton, the Tinaroo Dam lookout shelter, the Great Northern Hotel at Mareeba, the remodelling of the Courthouse Hotel in Cairns, and the Australian Hotel in Mackay. Much of his north Queensland work was influenced by the work of Dutch-born modernist architect Willem Marinus Dudok, whose use of dramatic massing, asymmetry, and overhanging eaves achieved international recognition and influence in the 1920s and 1930s. Orchard returned to live in Sydney in 1963 and died within a week aged 72.

In his design for the Zammit Cairns residence, Orchard tempered the use of modern materials, hipped roofs with wide eaves, and the demands of the tropical north Queensland climate, with elements of traditional Maltese house design. The building was double-storey, with the ground floor constructed of rendered brick and the upper level timber-framed and clad with chamferboard. The multi-hipped roof was clad in Durasbestos. Internally the public rooms (sitting room, dining room, front balcony and rear verandah) occupied the core of the upper level, with five bedrooms and a kitchen encircling it on the northern and southern ends of the building. Most of the ground floor was one large, timber-floored ballroom. By elevating the main living spaces, maximum advantage was taken of views to Trinity Inlet and banks of casement windows opened to sea breezes.

A large, decorative, half-winding internal staircase, handcrafted by a Maltese timber sculptor Mick Farrugia, ascended from the centre of the ballroom to the upper level. Behind the staircase on the ground floor, doors led to an undercroft space with washing facilities and another plainer stair leading to the rear verandah on the upper level. A bathroom and toilet, enclosed with chamferboards, was located in the south-west corner on each level. The timbers used inside included maple, silky oak, and Johnstone River hardwood. Farrugia and his family were sponsored immigrants nominated by the Zammits. Apart from the staircase and curved walls installed in the entry when the ballroom became small flats, he also custom-made furniture for the main and guest bedrooms.

The key elements of traditional Maltese design employed in the Zammit house included the composition of the street facade dominated by a centrally-positioned, street-level entry consisting of glass louvers either side of a door, a projecting bay above imitating the Maltese stone balcony; and then internally a decorative winding staircase leading off an entry vestibule, inside the front door and leading to the public spaces on the upper floor; and a public ballroom occupying the whole of the ground floor.

The Zammits moved into their new Cairns home around the time of the declaration of World War II in Europe, in September 1939, naming it Floriana, after a portside suburb of Floriana near the Maltese capital Valletta.

From 1942 North Queensland became the base from which allied forces fought the war in the Pacific and south-east Asia. Cairns was inundated with American and Australian soldiers, who were accommodated in the city's hotels and guesthouses and in a camp established in 1943 along the seaward side of the Esplanade, from Kerwin Street to the end of Minnie Street and just over a block to the south-east of Floriana. Gun emplacements were installed along the Esplanade and a Catalina flying boat base was established near the hospital, almost adjacent to the south-east of the house.

The Zammit family, who were all proficient at a variety of musical instruments, regularly entertained top visiting US and Australian Army show bands and the ground floor ballroom hosted many social and fundraising events. Two of the Zammit daughters married American servicemen and left as war brides to live in the United States, and another married an RAAF serviceman. The wedding celebrations were held in the family home.

In 1946 the Zammits converted the southern part of the ground floor ballroom into a flat for one of their married daughters, and the northern half was similarly converted soon after. Curved timber-panelled partitions, constructed by Mick Farrugia, created a central foyer just inside the entrance vestibule and sandwiched between the new flats, from which the staircase rose to the upper level. The flats only ever accommodated visiting relatives and friends.

Both during and after the war Paul Zammit continued to run the cane farm at Bartle Frere. In 1947 he funded the construction of a small concrete church there, the Church of St Paul, which was opened on 31 August by the Catholic Bishop of Cairns, the Most Rev. J Heavey. Its concrete blocks were made on Zammit's farm by his cane-cutters in the off-season, and the small local community funded the furnishings. Paul was awarded the Bene Merenti Medal by Pope Pius XII in January 1948, in recognition of his work for the Catholic Church in Queensland.

At this time an article in the Maltese News, a publication of the Maltese Social Society in Melbourne, discussed Zammit's reputation as the biggest sugar cane farmer in the Cairns district and acknowledged the unfailing support he had given to Maltese settlers in the area over the years. In addition to the friends and family he had assisted, he also financially supported Father John Camilleri through his studies at the Capuchin Seminary in Italy during the 1950s. Camilleri was to go on to serve the Diocese of Cairns for more than forty years until his death in 2006.

From the late 1940s Paul Zammit expanded his business interests in north Queensland. Between 1948 and 1953 Zammits Prospecting Pty Ltd, in partnership with the Fisher brothers, held five mining leases in the Batavia Gold Fields. The family also owned a number of rental houses around Cairns, as well as the two blocks of flats, and constructed the 65-room Continental Hotel at 67 Esplanade, which opened in 1956 and was one of the first high-rise buildings in Cairns. Zammit sponsored his wife's niece and her husband, Joe and Catherine Gatt, to come to Australia to work in this hotel. When they first arrived they lived in one of the ground floor flats in Floriana. The Zammits owned a holiday home at Yorkey's Knob.

Paul Zammit died in 1959, family sources attesting to the fact that he had achieved great success in business and engaged in much community work while being unable to write or read English and being only a tentative speaker of it. Ten years later Paulina transferred Floriana and the adjacent Spanish Mission flats to their son Salvatore and his wife Jean. She died in December 1979. Salvatore Zammit and his family lived in Floriana until 1981. In March 1982 the house and the adjacent flats passed out of the Zammit family and were converted into the Floriana Guesthouse and Hotel, offering a total of 24 guest rooms. Alterations to the house included the conversion of the upper floor into self-contained flats, and reconfiguration of the two downstairs flats into three. It is likely that at this time the semicircular hole was cut in the northern timber-panelled wall of the central entrance foyer to create a reception window, and timber louvered sliding doors were installed on the southern side of the entrance foyer.

In December 2006 an expensive and extensive renovation was completed, transforming the former Spanish Mission flats from a budget hotel to an upmarket Mediterranean-style complex with one and two bedroom villas and a pool, which were marketed as Floriana Villas. The original Floriana, known as Floriana Guesthouse, retains the early 1980s layout and currently comprises 10 ensuited rooms and self-contained bed sits.

== Description ==
Located on the Cairns Esplanade facing east towards parkland and ocean views stands Floriana, a large, double-storey former family house of the interwar period, which has been converted into multiple-residency holiday accommodation. It stands on a rectangular-shaped block of land between a set of 1930s Spanish Mission style flats (which form part of the same holiday accommodation complex) and a recent high-rise apartment building. The former house is set back from the street and is partially concealed by a front garden containing palms, ferns, shrubs and small trees. It is constructed from a variety of materials, including rendered brick and timber, and has a multi-hipped roof clad with corrugated fibrous cement sheeting. The former family home now houses ten residential accommodation units and an administration office.

In form the building comprises two main rectangular sections, each incorporating different materials and standards of workmanship: a front section addressing the Esplanade, and a slightly smaller section to the rear. The front section, the long side of which runs across the block, has a wide entrance bay projecting from the centre of the eastern (front) facade. The lower level of the front section is constructed of rendered masonry, with some chamferboard sections along the north and south sides. The upper floor is timber-framed and clad entirely in chamferboards. A single hipped roof sits over the main portion of the front section, with a separate hipped roof over the entrance bay. A skillion-roofed timber extension attached to the northern side of the house is the only major exception to the symmetry of the front facade.

The smaller rear section, which is stepped in on the north and south so that it is not as long as the front section, has the same chamferboard cladding continued around the upper floor, and a partially enclosed verandah area located in the centre of the western (rear) facade. The ground floor, originally an open area with an enclosed bathroom in the south-west corner, is now a combination of enclosed rooms (with chamferboard-clad walls) and semi-enclosed spaces with either vertical batten or diagonal lattice screens. A rear timber staircase ascends from the north-west corner of the house and along the western facade. The roof over the rear section is made up of two parallel hipped roofs extending at right angles from the roof of the front portion of the house. Attached to the end of these hipped sections is a narrower skillion extension over the partially enclosed stair and verandah area. Apart from this skillion section, which is clad in corrugated iron, the main roof is clad in fibrous-cement sheeting.

The front (eastern) facade of the house is divided into three bays by a central projecting bay which houses the main entrance on the ground floor and an enclosed balcony on the upper floor. The brick walls on either side of the entrance bay are ornamented by raised stripes in the render work. The main entrance has a later timber double door, flanked by early timber louvred panels that extend from waist height to lintel height. Immediately below these panels are narrow, rendered brick garden beds. Above the doorway is a narrow concrete ledge with a patterned edge detail and above this the name Floriana is set in relief into the render. Decorated square pillars stand at each corner of the entrance bay, extending up to window height on the first floor and containing small flower boxes on top. The enclosed front balcony on the upper level of the entrance bay has early timber-framed casement windows on all three sides. These double windows open outwards with three lights in each leaf, two of which (the top and bottom) are patterned art glass.

A single large window sits on either side of the entrance bay on both floors. The ground floor windows are semi-circular in shape, timber framed with a decorative masonry detail around the edge. The left hand window is unaltered, with the centre leaf a casement window that open outwards, while the right hand window has been altered to contain a glass-paned door opening out onto an enclosed area (a recent fence around this enclosed area is not considered to be of cultural heritage significance). The upper floor has cantilevered bay windows with flared chamferboard skirtings. Each one has four six-light casements.

The north facade has extensions added to the upper floor. The largest is an early timber extension supported on diagonal brackets. It houses a small bathroom and a verandah that faces the street. Next to this is a smaller semi-enclosed area with a lower floor level (function unknown). The area beneath these projecting extensions is in-filled with screens and used for storage. The west or rear facade has a cantilevered flat profile polycarbonate roofing with a bullnose edge, attached to the northern side below the level of the upper floor, supported by metal tie rods from above (not considered to be of cultural heritage significance). Beneath this awning the ground floor area is semi-enclosed with lattice screens. The upper floor has a semi-enclosed verandah area in the centre screened by a timber balustrade and louvered panels. Along the south boundary, a low skillion roof clad in transparent corrugated polycarbonate sheeting creates a covered walkway between the house and a high block work wall for part of the length of the house. Accommodation units on the ground floor are accessible via exterior doors.

The front entrance doors open into a short vestibule, which then opens into a central foyer with curved, timber-panelled side walls. Stained a dark brown, these walls separate the foyer from accommodation rooms on the south side of the house and an office on the north side. A semi-circular hole has been cut into the north wall to create a reception area counter. The foyer floor is polished timber ornamented by a central square formed by different types of in-laid timber in the centre of the room (part of the early ballroom floor). Other ornamental features include decorative plaster cornices and borders around entranceways. The main staircase occupies an alcove at the far end of the foyer, opposite the entrance. The winding half-turn staircase retains the original carved handrails and timber treads and is the dominant feature of the interior. Accommodation units and public areas (such as a laundry) occupy the remainder of the ground floor on the southern and western sides.

On the upper floor, six doors lead off the landing that wraps around three sides of the top of the staircase. Five of these lead into accommodation units and one leads via a small public sitting room to the rear verandah and staircase. Four of these doors appear to be early and in their original position and one appears to be the original front door relocated to the upper floor. The rooms in the former central core of the upper floor, which contained the dining room, sitting room and front balcony, have been divided by additional partitions in order to create accommodation units. Each unit consists of one or two rooms and an ensuite bathroom, and most have a kitchenette. Despite these alterations, many features such as ceiling roses, cornices and bay window seats remain in situ. Two further units are accessible via the rear verandah area and have share kitchen facilities.

Ground surfaces around the house are generally paved and the front garden is landscaped with recent garden beds. The front fence has a low concrete base with rounded concrete posts, each topped by a sphere. Between each post runs a tubular metal top and bottom rail. Low hedges are planted immediately behind the fence line. A driveway runs between Floriana and the Spanish Mission units to access a rear yard which contains a swimming pool, barbeque area and a small, single storey building along the southern boundary (use unknown). These features, as well as modern signage and shade structures found within the front garden and attached to the front facade, are not considered to be of cultural heritage significance.

== Heritage listing ==
Floriana was listed on the Queensland Heritage Register on 30 April 2010 having satisfied the following criteria.

The place is important in demonstrating the evolution or pattern of Queensland's history.

Floriana, a two-storey brick and timber house located on the Cairns Esplanade overlooking Trinity Inlet, was constructed in 1939 as the city residence of Paul and Paulina Zammit and their family. The place demonstrates the contribution that Europeans have made to the evolution of Queensland as a multi-cultural society. It demonstrates how in the early part of the 20th century some immigrants to North Queensland were able to advance financially and socially. The house is a clear marker of the success of the Zammit family in Queensland which is announced to both the North Queensland community and the Maltese diaspora. It does so by explicitly blending features of Queensland and Maltese design.

Mr Zammit was an immigrant from Malta in 1912 who became one of the most successful sugar farmers in North Queensland with a property near Bartle Frere serving the Babinda Mill. He subsequently became a major investor in gold mining and property development. Maltese immigrants were a significant part of the development of the sugar industry and Mr Zammit became a leader of the Maltese community throughout Queensland.

The place is significant because the Zammits selected a site in the best residential street in Cairns, employed a notable architect (Edwin R Orchard) and erected a substantial two-storey house that incorporated a number of traditional Maltese elements within the overall format of a Queensland house of its era. The design is unique in that it incorporates the principal characteristics a modern interwar house - multi-hipped roof, wide overhanging eaves, enclosed balconies and Art Moderne (Art Deco) decorative interior detailing - with the elements of traditional Maltese housing. These elements included: the provision of a prominent, centrally positioned ground floor entrance emphasised by a semi-enclosed balcony above the entrance vestibule and louvred timber panels either side of the main door; the whole of the ground floor taken up by a large ballroom; and at the core of the house, a substantial and decorative winding staircase which is of aesthetic value in its own right. Maltese timber sculptor, Mick Farrugia, crafted both the central stair (1939) and the 1946 ground floor vestibule walls.
