= Edwin Roy Orchard =

Australian architect (1891–1963)

Edwin (Ted) Orchard (1891–1963) was an Australian architect, who practised in Sydney, New South Wales, and in Cairns, Queensland. A number of his designs are now heritage-listed.

== Early life ==
Edwin Roy Orchard was born in 1891 in Sydney, the son of William H Orchard and his wife Louisa.

== Architectural career ==
Orchard was an established Sydney North Shore architect who is credited with designing the earliest Californian Bungalow-influenced houses in New South Wales between 1913 and 1915 (three of his Sydney designs have been entered in the New South Wales State Heritage Register).

Orchard relocated to Mareeba during the Depression and was involved in the tobacco industry until 1933, when he established an architectural practice in Cairns. He registered with the Queensland Chapter of the Royal Society of Architects in 1936. In 1937, he undertook a world tour from which he learned a great deal about architecture to suit tropical regions.

Orchard's other projects in the Cairns region included: Tobruk Memorial Pool (in partnership with Jack McElroy), St David's Anglican Church at Mossman, motor showrooms and a hotel in Atherton, the Tinaroo Dam lookout shelter, the Great Northern Hotel at Mareeba, the remodelling of the Courthouse Hotel in Cairns, and the Australian Hotel in Mackay. Much of his north Queensland work was influenced by the work of Dutch-born modernist architect Willem Marinus Dudok, whose use of dramatic massing, asymmetry, and overhanging eaves achieved international recognition and influence in the 1920s and 1930s.

== Later life ==
Orchard returned to live in Sydney in 1963 and died on 2 October 1963 aged 72 years.

== Significant works ==
- Floriana (residence), Cairns North (1939), now listed on the Queensland Heritage Register
- St David's Anglican Church, Mossman, now listed on the Queensland Heritage Register
- Galada (residence), Cremorne
