= Queensland Acclimatisation Society =

The Queensland Acclimatisation Society (QAS) was an acclimatisation society based in Brisbane, Queensland, Australia which operated from 1862 to 1956. Its primary interest was in the introduction of exotic plants, particularly tropical and sub-tropical, to Queensland, both for economic and ornamental purposes.

== History ==
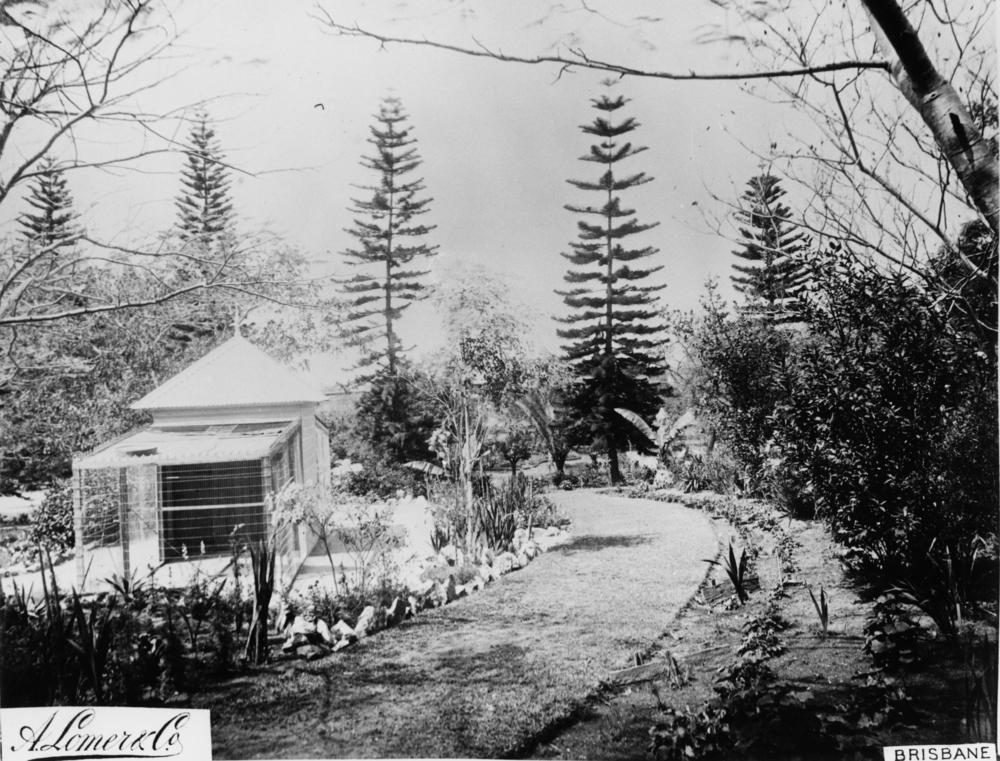
Aviary and acclimatisation gardens, Bowen Park, Brisbane, circa 1889

From its inception in 1862 at the instigation of the Governor of Queensland, Sir George Bowen, the Queensland Acclimatisation Society focussed on contributing to the development of Queensland's fledgling agricultural industry. It imported plants that had commercial potential and conducted experiments to determine if they could be adapted to Queensland's tropical and sub-tropical climate. Plants researched included sugar cane, bananas, cotton, apples, pineapples, pasture grasses, maize, olives, mangoes, pecan nuts and macadamia nuts. Many of these became important agricultural crops in Queensland.

The society fulfilled a supporting role to the sugar industry from 1863. In that year, the Queensland Acclimatisation Society began importing cane from Mauritius and New Caledonia and distributing it to growers. Until well into the 20th century, they continued researching into the crop, importing and distributing new varieties and experimenting with propagating cane from seed and artificially cross- fertilising canes. They produced a popular variety of sugar cane, Q813, which was known for its resistance to disease and was still in use as late as 1926.

Before the establishment of the Department of Agriculture, the society acted as a government advisory body on agricultural matters. Until at least 1888, it was dependent on government funding and regarded itself to all intents and purposes as a government institution. The society contributed to the establishment of the Queensland Herbarium, the Kamerunga State Nursery, and the Queensland Forestry Department.

Between 1914 and 1915, the society closed its first gardens at Bowen Park and moved its operational base to a 100-acre property on the south bank of the North Pine River at Lawnton (the Acclimatisation Society gardens, Lawnton). The society had begun to lose Government support after the establishment of the Department of Agriculture in 1887 and this, together with the expansion of the adjoining National Association grounds (the present Brisbane Exhibition Grounds), meant that Bowen Park was no longer viable. No buildings associated with the Queensland Acclimatisation Society remain extant at the Bowen Park site.

The Lawnton site already contained an old house (no longer extant) on the banks of the river. This was raised and repaired. In March 1915, tenders were requested for the construction of a new cottage (extant but altered) including a "roomy office" for storing the society's books and papers. A tender for £306 was accepted and the cottage was completed by August 1915. During the 1920s, further structures were built including propagating houses, a tool house and a fumigating plant. Between 1935 and 1936, ornamental trees were planted along the entrance driveway.

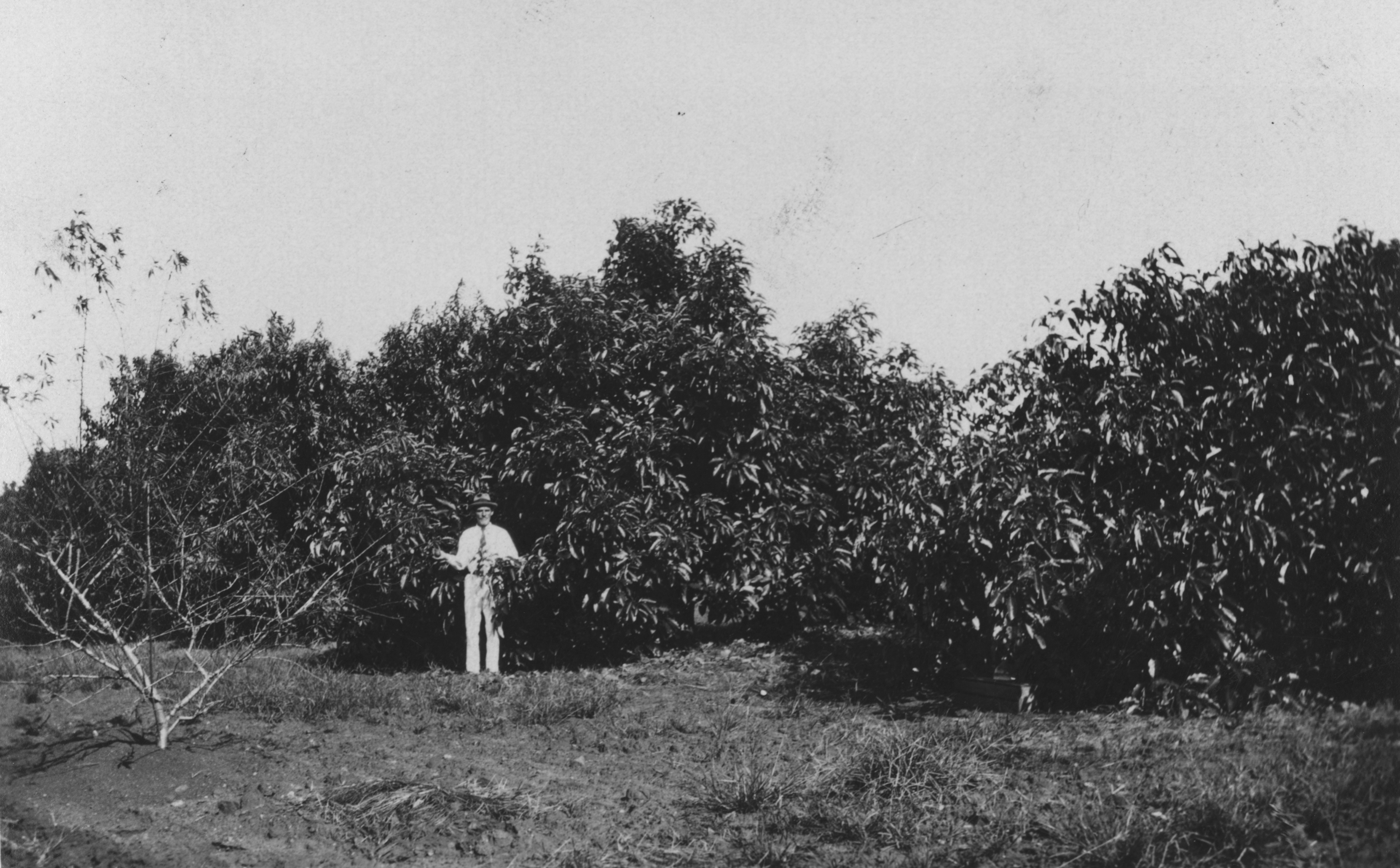
Avocado fruit trees, Queensland Acclimatisation Society, Lawnton

During some thirty years of operation at Lawnton, the society continued to assist Queensland's agricultural industry. In its research, the society worked with the Department of Agriculture and the Council for Scientific and Industrial Research (now the CSIRO). Plants introduced and researched at Lawnton included cotton, castor oil plants, avocados, pecan nuts, citrus fruits, macadamia nuts, custard apples, mangoes, pineapples, soy beans and fodder canes. The society contributed to making avocados, pecan nuts and grape fruit commercially viable crops in Queensland. The Allsopp variety of avocado, named after the society's overseer, was developed at the Lawnton gardens. The Pecan Nut grove was located at the northern end of the gardens on the present Bray Road. It was still flourishing when the gardens were sold.

Pecan nuts are now a commercial crop in Australia with in excess of 100 growers in Queensland, New South Wales and Western Australia. It is difficult to establish a direct link between the Acclimatisation society's work on pecan nuts and the present commercial crop. The society was probably only one of many organisations and individuals who contributed to the commercial development of the crop. However, the pecan nut trees at Lawnton are the only pre-World War II Acclimatisation Society plantings, known to be extant, that are related to commercial crops. They are therefore important in illustrating the society's work in supporting Queensland's agricultural industries.

The society sold its Lawnton gardens between 1941 and 1942 and moved to a ten-acre property at Redcliffe. This move was prompted by land degradation at Lawnton. The land was subsequently operated as a dairy farm until its subdivision for residential purposes commenced in 1959.

== Notable members ==
- Leslie Corrie, president for many years
- Lewis Adolphus Bernays, foundation member and first Honorary Secretary
- Maurice Charles O'Connell, MLC, first President
- Charles Coxen, MLA, first Vice-President
