= Bowen Park, Brisbane =

Bowen Park
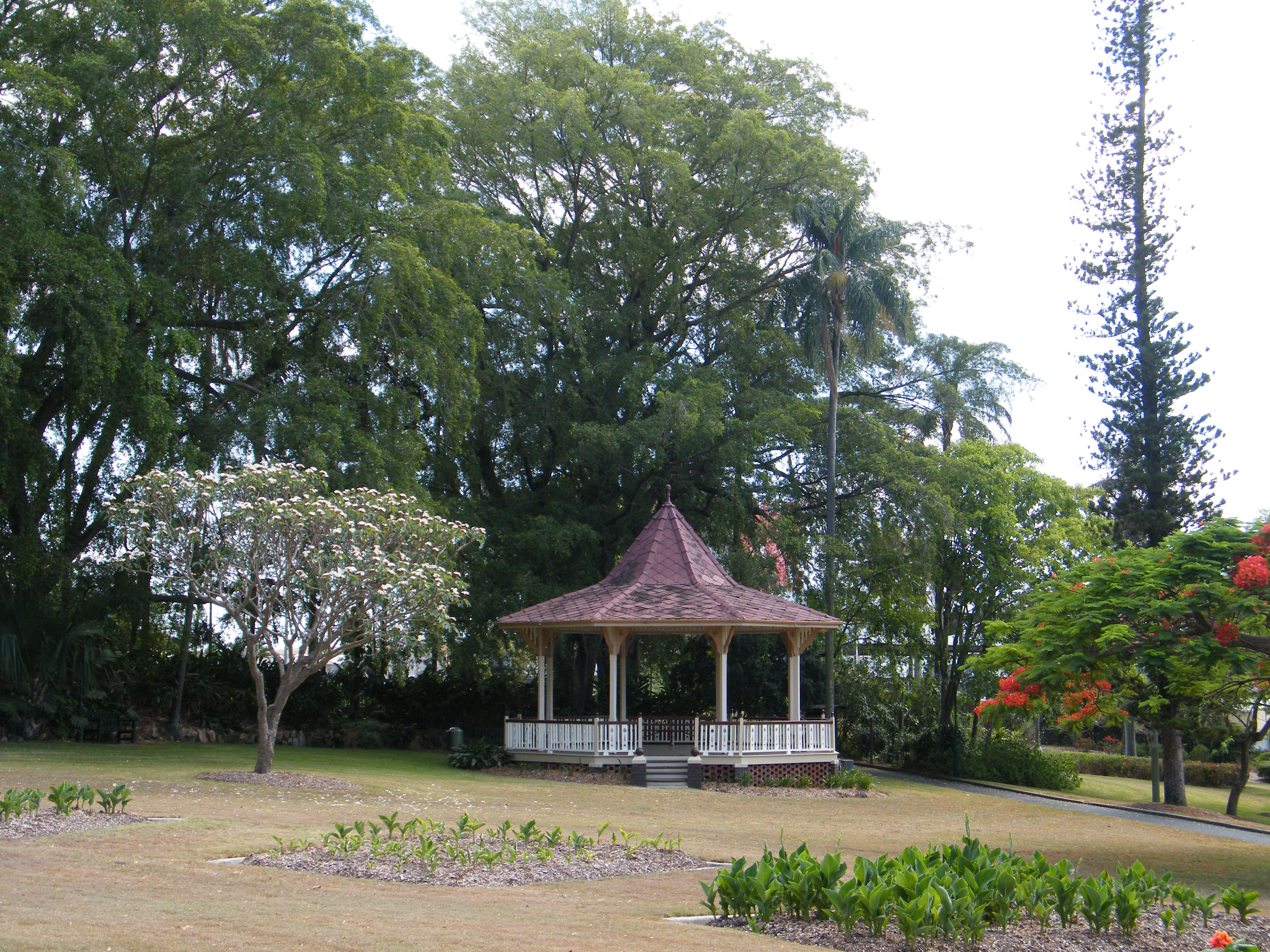
- Bandstand in Bowen Park
- Interactive map of Bowen Park
- Location: Brisbane, Queensland, Australia
- Area: 17,740m²
- Created: 1863
- Operator: Brisbane City Council
- Designation: State Heritage Place (Queensland Heritage Register)

Bowen Park, Brisbane
- Location within Queensland
- 27.4489°S 153.0298°E
- Location: O'Connell Terrace, Bowen Hills, City of Brisbane, Queensland, Australia

History
- Design period: 1840s–1860s (mid-19th century)
- Built: 1863–1950s

Queensland Heritage Register
- Official name: Bowen Park
- Type: state heritage (built, landscape)
- Designated: 26 February 1999
- Reference no.: 601523
- Significant period: 1914–1950s (fabric); 1863–1914 (historical); 1863–ongoing (social)
- Significant components: garden edging/balustrades/planter boxes, garden – ornamental/flower, toilet block/earth closet/water closet, rotunda, gate – entrance, wall/s – retaining, steps/stairway, trees/plantings, pathway/walkway

Bowen Park is a heritage-listed park of 17,740 square metres (191,000 sq ft) at O'Connell Terrace (corner of Bowen Bridge Road), Bowen Hills, City of Brisbane, Queensland, Australia. It was built from 1863 to 1950s. It was also known as the Acclimatisation Society Gardens. It was added to the Queensland Heritage Register on 26 February 1999.

== History ==
Bowen Park is a 1.774 hectares (4.38 acres) remnant of a parcel of land of almost 40 acres (16 ha) bordered by O'Connell Terrace, Bowen Bridge Road, Gregory Terrace and Brooke Street. The park is important for its survival and continued use since 1863 as a park for public pleasure in inner-city Brisbane, an area under pressure to accommodate increased urban development and consolidation. The Queensland Government granted land to the Queensland Acclimatisation Society (QAS) in two parcels in 1863 and 1866, this site was then well out of town on the edge of development and had been worked as a brickfield. Part of this land lay along the watercourse of York's Hollow and the remainder was remnant bushland and brickworks. The site was not ideal for establishing a garden, the soil being of poor quality and rocky in parts, and required substantial reclamation work to form the gardens.

The society named the Gardens after George Bowen, the Governor of Queensland and their patron. Over the years parts of the land were progressively leased, sold and resumed for other purposes, resulting in only 17,740 square metres (191,000 sq ft) remaining by 1955 in the north-western corner of the original site (on the corner of O'Connell Terrace and Bowen Bridge Road).

The Bowen Park of 1862 consisted of a series of clay holes and rough bush with a wretched bush track leading from the city across the Fortitude Valley. The area became an attractive and popular recreational venue from 1863 when the QAS established its gardens which extended from the creek to Bowen Bridge Road. The gardens were named Bowen Park, Acclimatisation Society Gardens in honour of the first Governor of Queensland and initial patron of the QAS, Sir George Ferguson Bowen, who was active in the establishment of the QAS.

The QAS was formed in 1862 and was most active during its first thirty years introducing, testing, propagating and distributing new plant materials. From its gardens in Bowen Park, it played an important role in commercial agriculture in Queensland and introduced or trialed many crops including mango trees, ginger plants, sugar cane, olive trees and choko vines. There was also some experimental work with specialty crops including cocaine. The Society played an important role in the development of civic and domestic landscapes in Queensland through its concern with ornamental and garden trees and shrubs. From Bowen Park, the Society provided plants to towns, churches and cemeteries. The society also organised educational meetings on botanical subjects. Whereas the Acclimatisation Societies in New South Wales and Victoria placed a considerable emphasis on animals, the QAS focussed on plants though at various times deer, llamas, rabbits, Chinese sheep, Angora goats, pheasants, partridges and a variety of songbirds were on show at Bowen Park.

It is not clear how the QAS used all parts of their land holding but it appears that the main display gardens visited by the public were on the northern and lower parts of their land. The northern portion is within the surviving remnant. The QAS used the site to grow and propagate plants and seeds obtained from other parts of the colony and around the world. They built an office and boardroom, bush-house and glasshouse and established an orchard and formed gardens with ornamental plants. Their plantings were extensive and by 1871 the gardens were recognised as a place of public instruction and recreation. William Soutter was overseer at Bowen Park from 1885 it 1898. Known for his scientific experimentation, horticultural skill and design sense, he was instrumental in Bowen Park achieving a reputation as both an experimental and a recreational/display garden.

The other major botanical garden in Brisbane was the Brisbane City Botanical Gardens (BCBG) established in 1855. Both gardens shared common botanical interests but differed considerably in arrangement and visual character. Both were places for public use and enjoyment. The QAS Gardens were considered to eclipse the BCBG and English nurseryman, James Veitch, in 1880 claimed that the QAS Gardens contained the best collection of tropical trees outside the tropics. An early catalogue indicates an equal diversity of plants in the two gardens. At BCBG the design incorporated simple straight pathways, uninterrupted lines of single species of plants and elements of a gardenesque design approach which featured individual plants. In contrast, the character of the QAS Gardens was that of a picturesque and exuberant tropical garden.

Decorative elements of the gardens included a four-metre high coral-stone grotto-like ornamental fountain encrusted with shells, ferns and lichen, four pieces of neo-classical statuary (the four seasons), a gift from Joseph Oppenheimer, urns and various planting pots, several giant clam shells; all complemented by complex carpet bedding displays on and around a quatrefoil-shaped island within a lagoon with a bamboo grove backdrop. The Victorian planting was massed in shrubberies and borders interspersed with winding paths creating a wild woodland jungle ambience.

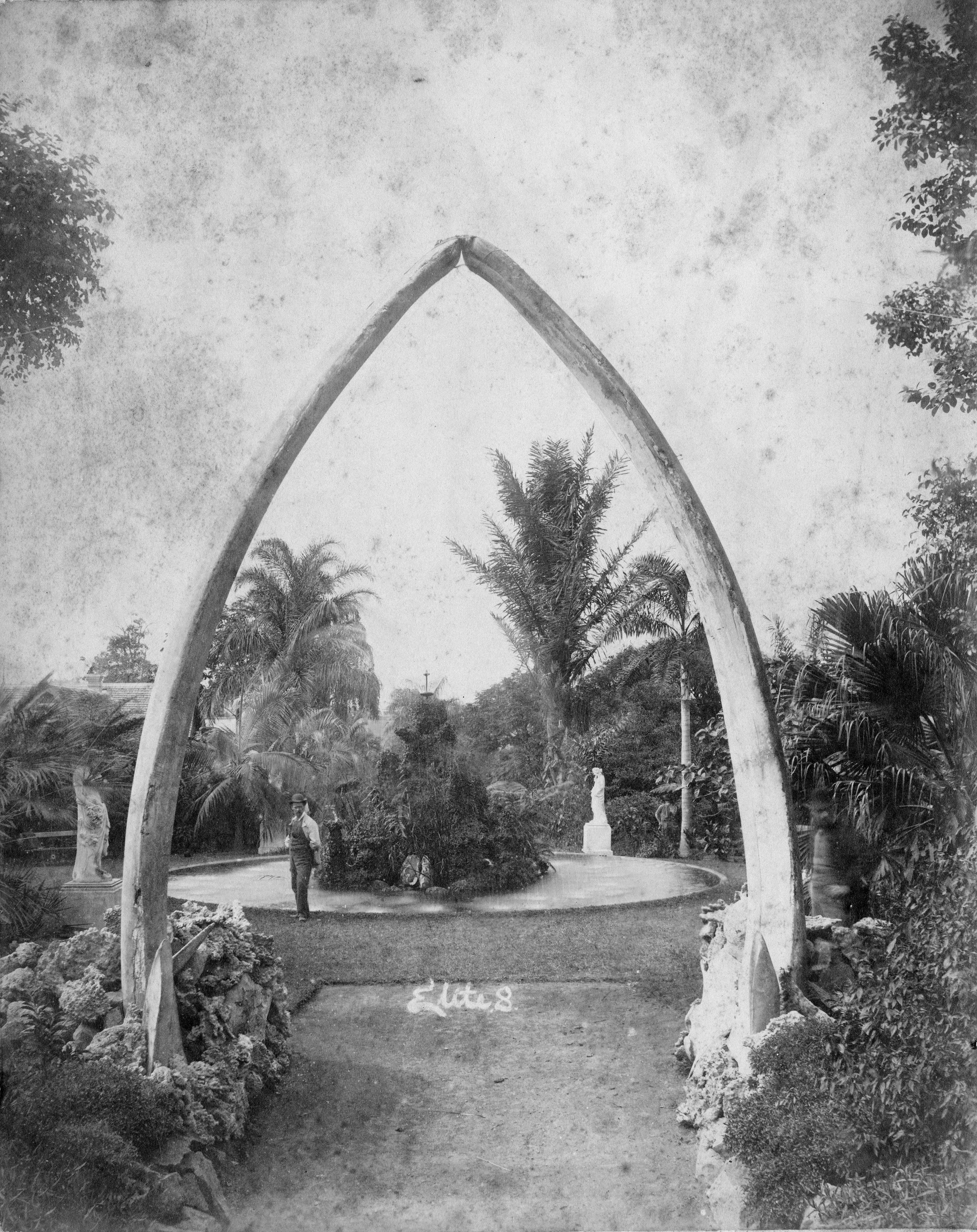
Whale bone archway entrance to the Acclimatisation Gardens at Bowen Park, circa 1880

In August 1872, an 84-foot (26 m) long black whale was found stranded on Woody Island in Hervey Bay. It was the largest whale ever seen in the area. Although the original plan was to tow the whale carcass to Maryborough to extract the whale oil, it was decided that extract the oil from the whale at Woody Island and the ship Effie set forth from Maryborough with men and barrels for the job. The boiling-down of the whale yielded 1,500 imperial gallons (6,800 L; 1,800 US gal) of oil. The Queensland Government requested that the skeleton be preserved to be kept as a scientific specimen. Some of the whale bones were donated to the acclimatization society in January 1887. The jawbones were used to create a archway for the entrance to Bowen Park; it was 22 feet (6.7 m) high.

The Queensland National Agricultural and Industrial Association was formed in 1875 and 17 acres (6.9 ha) of the Queensland Acclimatisation Society's land was leased to the National Association as a venue for exhibitions. In 1876 this exhibition area was fenced off, the first exhibition building erected and the first Intercolonial Exhibition was staged. In 1881, 12 acres (4.9 ha) were resumed from the Society's holding to construct the railway line from Brisbane to Sandgate. From 1879 23 acres (9.3 ha) of land from the QAS holding was leased to the National Association for fifty years for use as an exhibition ground.

As the National Association continued with its annual exhibition (now known informally as the Ekka), the QAS diminished. The former continued to acquire land until the QAS held only 4 acres (1.6 ha). During its most vigorous period many prominent Queensland pastoralists, professional and business people were members of the QAS. As commercial plant nurseries grew and as a range of other public enterprises in horticulture and agriculture were established support for the QAS declined. The 1890s depression affected the maintenance of the QAS Gardens and many plants were sold or transferred to the BCBG.

Relations between the National Association and the QAS were not harmonious and their dealings were hampered by distrust and jealousy. The National Association had become the more important organisation with a considerable annual turnover and reluctantly remained a tenant of the QAS. These difficulties were resolved by the passage of the National Association and Acclimatisation Society Act 1890 under which the Queensland Government resumed the land occupied by the National Association from the QAS and granted it to the A•association. By 1906, the QAS was relocating its operations to Lawnton on the North Pine River and the Brisbane Municipal Council held the former Acclimatisation Gardens as a reserve for a public park under the Acclimatisation Act 1907.

By 1914 the QAS had removed its diminished operations to depots at Lawnton and Wellington Point. The Brisbane Municipal Council purchased the society's remaining holding in Bowen Park and officially opened the gardens as a public recreational reserve on 11 June 1914. The council regarded Bowen Park as both a public park for pleasure and recreation and as a nursery for their parks and reserves. Under the supervision of the council's first Parks Superintendent, Henry Moore, substantial works and improvements were undertaken, including the erection of a bandstand rotunda, introduction of a water service, repair of the glass house and bush house, filling in of the lagoon and construction of new entrance gates. Landscaping work was undertaken including the establishment of eighteen flower beds, five of which formed a rondel around a palm tree on the southern sloping. A number of rose beds were planted out and four statues that had been part of the Acclimatisation Society gardens' fountain were relocated in open lawns. A cottage was erected on O'Connell Terrace for the council's chauffeur and in 1915 the public toilets on the Bowen Bridge Road boundary were constructed. The path configuration was consolidated during this period of work with secondary paths to the Bowen Bridge Road edge added later under Oakman.

From 1930 to 1950 further parcels of land were sold to the now Royal National Agricultural and Industrial Association (RNA) and in 1940 the widening of Bowen Bridge Road reclaimed a further 13.3 perches (340 m^{2}). There was considerable opposition to attempts by the RNA to claim more land from Bowen Park during the 1950s but 8.9 perches (230 m^{2}) was reclaimed for the wood chopping stadium in 1955.

Between 1950 and 1959 Harry Oakman, Parks Superintendent for Brisbane City Council, oversaw changes to the park,

During 1950 to 1959, Harry Oakman, Parks Superintendent for Brisbane City Council, prepared a plan for additional works in Bowen Park, including the addition of paths and drinking fountains, and the redesign of garden beds. His intention was to present colourful patterned displays on the lawns to passing traffic and tram passengers and to patients and staff in the Royal Brisbane Hospital (across Bowen Bridge Road). He retained most of the major trees planted during 1914–1917 and those remaining from the QAS period including fig trees (Ficus benjamina) in the centre, bunya (Araucaria bidwillii), hoop (Araucaria cunninghamii) and Cook (Araucaria columnaris) pines, phoenix palm (Phoenix sp), an English oak (Quercus robusta), a rubber tree (Ficus elastica), frangipanis (Plumeria obtusa) and poincianas (Delonix regia). He replaced the circular flower beds on the southern sloping lawn with decorative shaped colourful beds. On the cleared northern terrace he planted a large circular arrangement of flower beds surrounded by a hedge. He added paths and modified the Bowen Bridge Road edge to include extensive flower beds. A drinking fountain was included at the south entrance off Bowen Bridge Road. His plant vocabulary included acalyphas, crotons, plumbago, belerperone and ginger - plants used in many of his Brisbane park designs.

Since 1960 the Brisbane City Council park management has maintained the park structure and layout of paths and retained the trees. Many display beds for annuals have been removed. The large round bedding display in the north section has been removed and perennials planted in the central beds. The edge of the Park to Bowen Bridge Road has been altered with road widenings and the addition of a tram shelter (c. 1920s) and bus shelters (c. 1990s). The lower stone walls, Acalypha hedging and some flower displays remain.

== Description ==
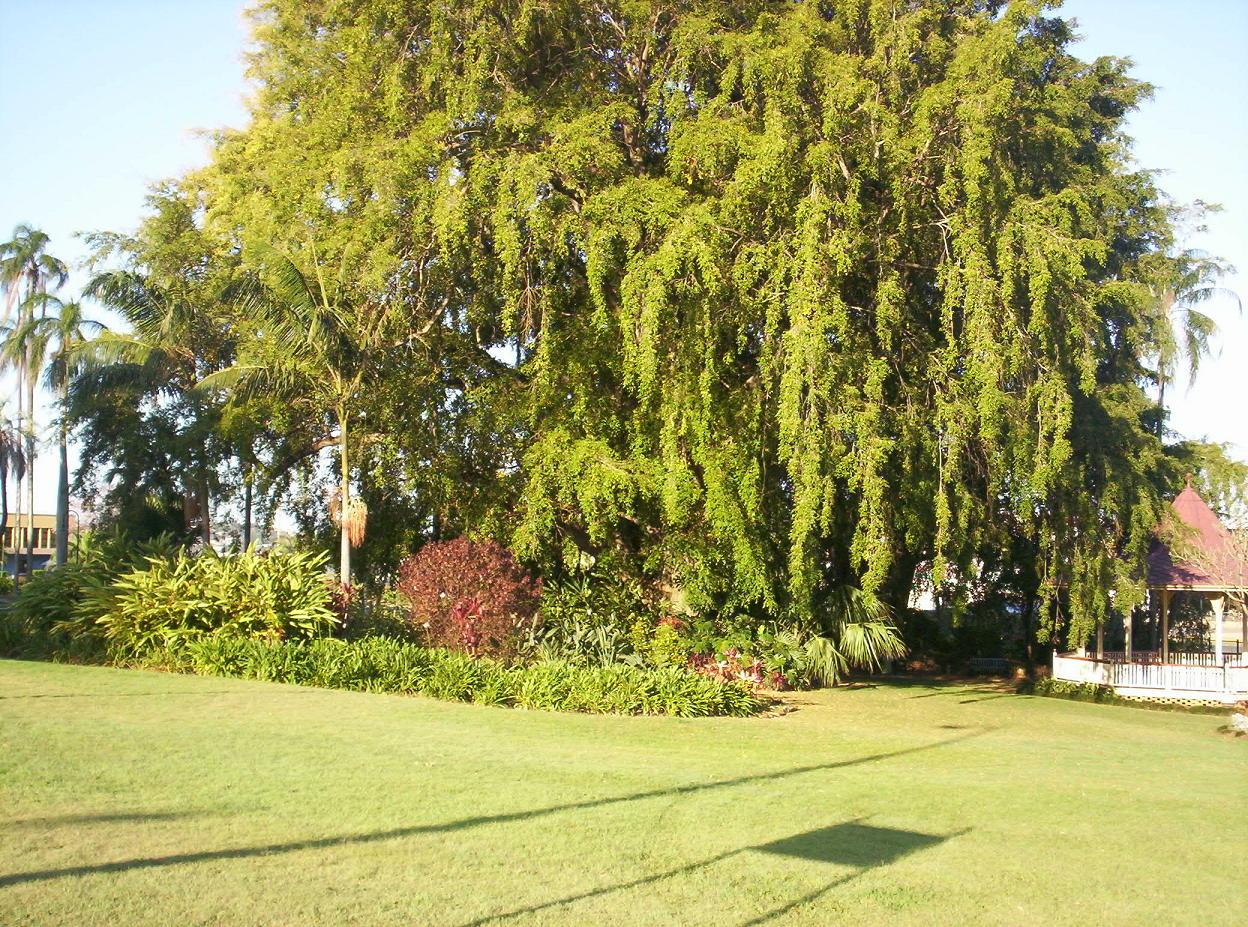
Major trees, 2005

Located on a major arterial road linking Brisbane City with the northern suburbs and the Bruce Highway, Bowen Park occupies a prominent position on the northern edge of Brisbane's commercial centre. The Park is bounded by Bowen Bridge Road, O'Connell Terrace and the Royal National Association (RNA) showgrounds with pedestrian access from Bowen Bridge Road between the Park and the RNA Bowen Bridge Road entry gate.

A peaceful retreat in stark contrast to its surrounds and neighbours, it has undergone three distinct phases of development with evidence of each phase surviving. The park retains trees considered to be part of the QAS major plantings from the 1860s to the 1890s, evidence of the extensive design work and extensive planting undertaken in 1914 to 1917 by Henry Moore for the Brisbane Municipal Council and work undertaken during the third phase of development by Harry Oakman for the Brisbane City Council from 1950 to 1959.

The Bowen Bridge Road edge has survived over the history of the landholding and formed the boundary of the Queensland Acclimatisation Society's Gardens from 1863. The principal Park entries lie along this edge: to the south, marked by a mature hoop pine (Araucaria cunninghamii), a concrete and Brisbane tuff stairway descends through beds edged with tuff; the arched entry; the entry at the circular annuals bed; and to the north, the tree canopy path between tuff garden walls. This edge of Bowen Park also contains simple, medium height planting of hedges and borders, beds of annuals, strips of lawn, the secondary paths installed by Oakman and the toilet block. The adjacent footpath has a clutter of tram/bus shelters. The openness of this edge affords passersby a view across the park.

A decorative iron arch containing the words BOWEN PARK springs from freestanding painted concrete piers to form the main entrance to the Park. A freestanding pier to the north and south form narrower entrance ways.

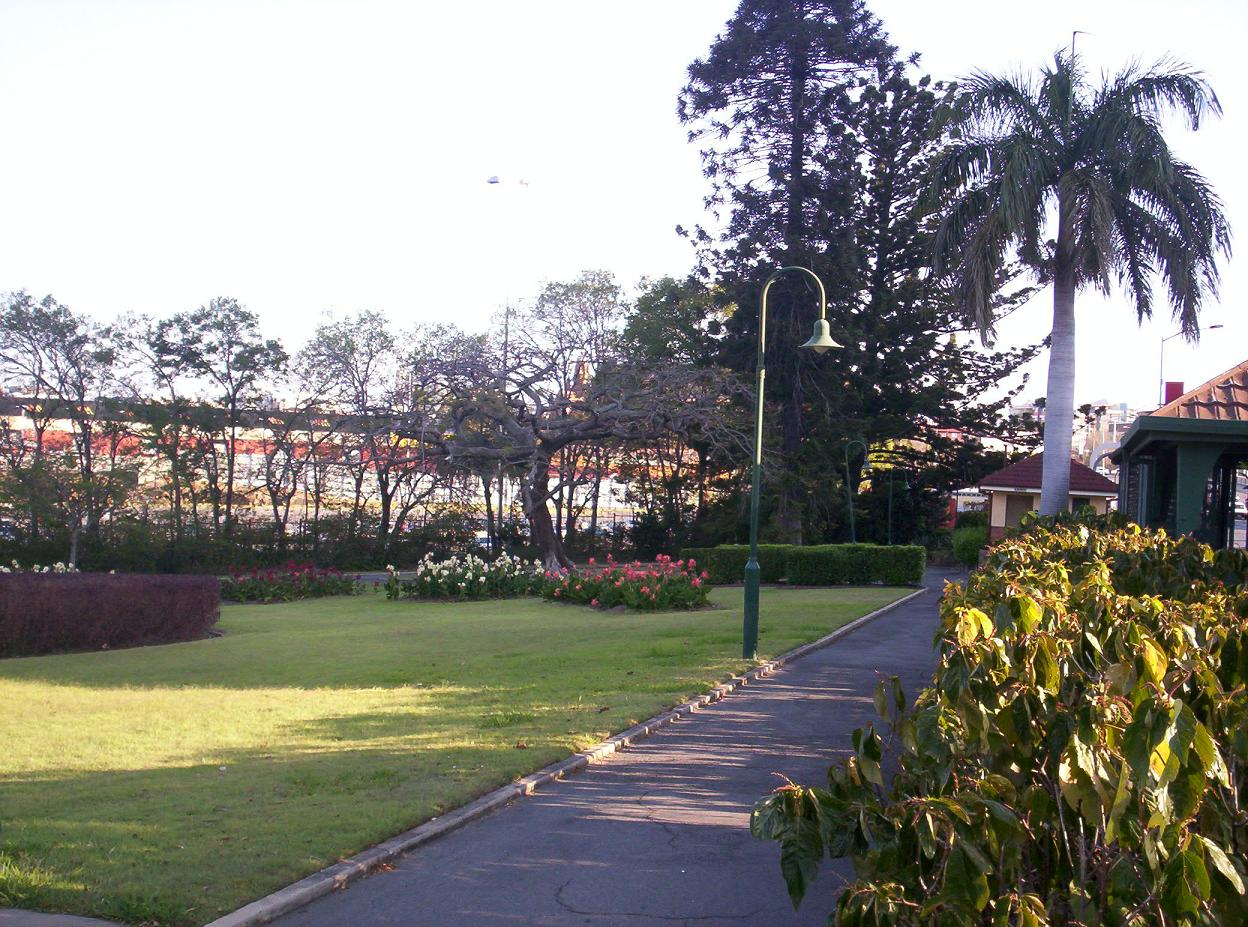
Pathway to the toilets, 2005

The toilet block on the Bowen Bridge Road boundary is a small single- storey loadbearing brick structure with a tiled roof with a timber battened soffit. It sits on a base of face brick finishing at a header course of dark bricks. The upper portion of the external walls is finished in a roughcast cement render. The entrance to the male section is to the north and to the female side is entered from the south.

The tram/bus shelters are on the footpath adjacent to the park and do not form part of the park but do impact on the integrity of the garden edge and views across and into the park. An early timber-framed tram shelter has been truncated to accommodate the widening of Bowen Bridge Road and recent steel framed bus shelters clutter along the park edge.

O'Connell Terrace forms the northern edge of the park and was part of the boundary of the QAS grounds. Two bauhinias (Bauhinia sp.) survive from an earlier row of street trees on the footpath. The park edge is defined by low stone wall and hedges (Acalypha sp. and Spiraea sp.). Clumped palms (Chrysalidocarpus lutescens and Syagrus romanzoffiana) mark two pedestrian entries onto pathways through the park.

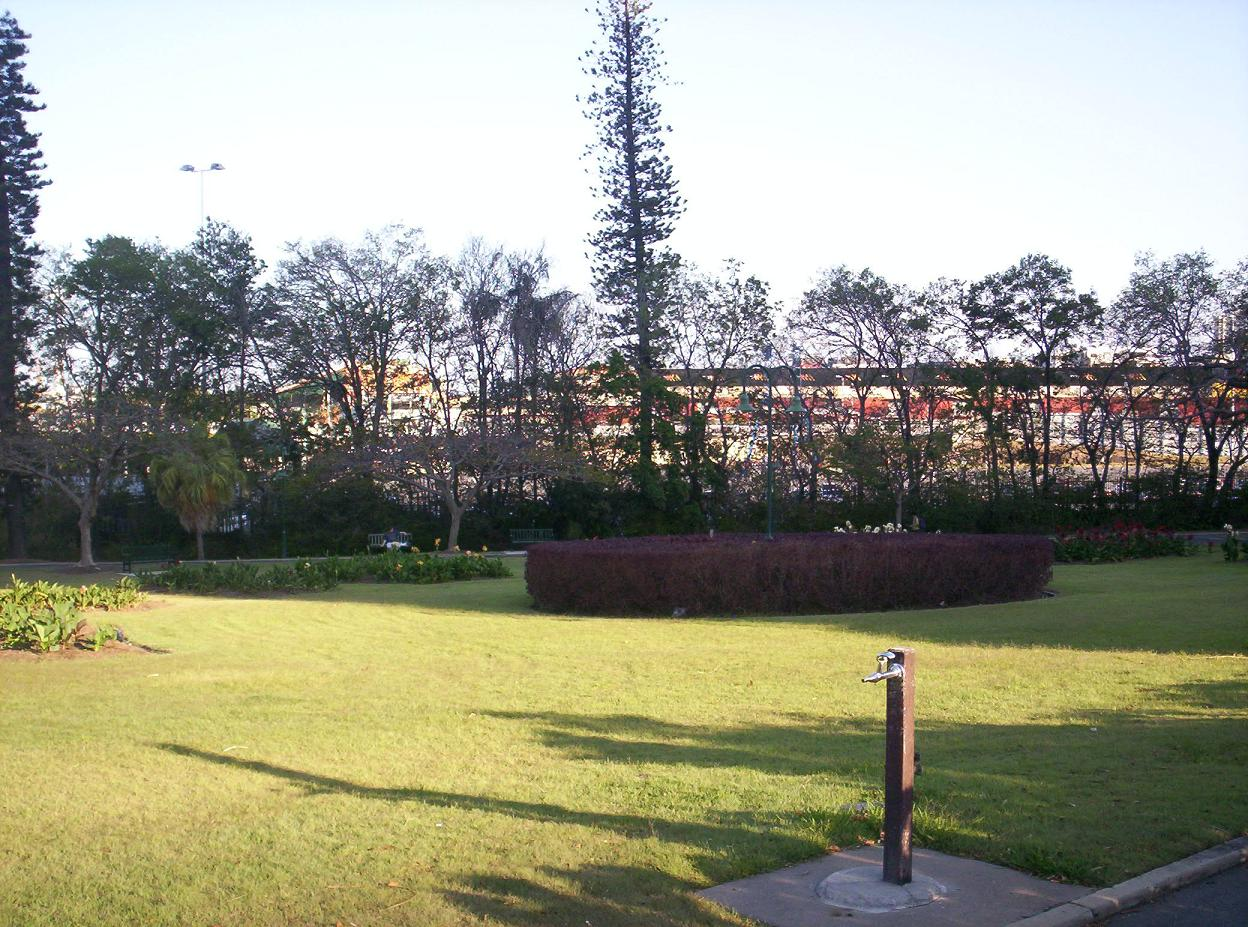
Lawns, 2005

The northern lawns segment extends from the O'Connell Terrace edge across the park to the impressive edge formed by the fig trees (Ficus benjamina) and associated exuberant planting and from Bowen Bridge Road to the eastern pedestrian entry. A set of Brisbane tuff stairs ascends from O'Connell Terrace at the north-west corner to a now open level lawn area which was the site of the Superintendent's cottage from 1914 to 1949. It was later established as a series of circular ornamental beds planted with annuals and surrounded by hedging under Oakman's management. The lawn area is edged by the early plantings of leopard (Flindersia maculosa), bauhinia (Bauhinia hookeri), flame (Brachychiton acerifolius) and fig (Ficus microcarpa var. hillii) trees with their associated underplanting that frame the north entrance off Bowen Bridge Road. The central sloping lawn is bisected by a path and planted randomly with a variety of palms. Many of the palms are plantings from the early twentieth century. This portion of the park, formerly containing the glasshouse, cottage and associated nursery activities, served as a separate area to the primary display and recreation areas of the QAS Gardens and the Brisbane Municipal Council's 1914 redevelopment. The Figs (Ficus benjamina) and associated understorey planting may have served as a separation between the areas.

In the Figs/Rockery central garden area the large fig trees (Ficus benjamina) form a massive canopy shading the pathway and tuff edged gardens planted with an understorey of subtropical foliage plants. These fig trees (Ficus benjamina) were in the park prior to the Council's substantial works in 1914 and 1915 and may have been planted for the QAS Gardens.

A line of Chinese celtis (Celtis sinensis) and an overgrowth of trees and shrubs choke the RNA/Bowen Park Boundary. The Cook pine (Araucaria columnaris) and coral tree (Erythrina hendersonii) are possibly remnants from QAS plantings.

The trees and shrubs on the RNA northern boundary form a screen and edge to the eastern spaces of the Park. A gravel vehicle path from O'Connell Terrace to the Brisbane City Council depot runs beside the curved edge boundary bed which contains a mature rubber tree (Ficus elastica). The depot is housed in the space beneath the RNA grandstand built to this boundary. The curved bed and the kidney shaped beds in the area are planted with hedges (Acalypha sp.) and shrubs. Prominent trees include the English oak tree (Quercus robur), Phoenix palm (Phoenix sp.) and English elm (Ulmus sp.). A pair of ornamental beds planted with colourful cannas (Canna sp.) edges the lower path into the Park.

The Rotunda lawns and beds, in association with the fig tree/rockery backdrop, are the primary focus and identity of the Park. The lawns slope down from the Bowen Bridge Road edge to the shrubbery border along the RNA showgrounds. The main path curves through the lower half from the southern corner at Bowen Bridge Road to the eastern corner at O'Connell Terrace. The bandstand rotunda and colourful central flower beds are the focal points of this area. This area contains evidence of the three major phases of garden development for the Park. The bunya (Araucaria bidwillii), hoop (Araucaria cunninghamii) and Cook (Araucaria columnaris) pines remain from the time of the QAS Gardens. The semi-circle of poinciana (Delonix regia) was established during the 1914 Council refurbishment and sits around an ornamental circular flower bed redesigned by Harry Oakman in the late 1950s.

The free standing, octagonal, timber-framed rotunda stands on face brick piers with brick infill panels. Eight hardwood posts support a bell shaped roof clad with fibre cement shingles. The timber lined ceiling of eight triangular panels falls towards the centre of the rotunda. A decorative timber valance with a harp motif fringes the roof and the rotunda has a timber balustrade containing a tulip motif. The rotunda provides a shady retreat for garden visitors and an elegant platform for band concerts or other performances. The structure was erected in 1914 to a design by Alfred Foster, architectural assistant to the City Engineer. It is similar to the rotunda in New Farm Park also designed by Foster and constructed in 1915.

== Heritage listing ==
Bowen Park was listed on the Queensland Heritage Register on 26 February 1999 having satisfied the following criteria.

The place is important in demonstrating the evolution or pattern of Queensland's history.

Bowen Park survives as part of the site of the Queensland Acclimatisation Society's (QAS) grounds and gardens from 1863 to 1914. Remnant planting from this time is important in demonstrating the operations of the QAS and its contribution to the development of commercial agriculture and civic and domestic landscapes in Queensland.

As one of the first parks established by the Brisbane Municipal Council, Bowen Park demonstrates the importance the Council placed on the provision of recreational parks and gardens. The Park is important for its association with the Council nursery activities associated with the gardens and the contribution these activities made to the maintenance and improvement of Bowen Park and other parks and reserves under Council jurisdiction.

Bowen Park is an integral element within an historic precinct situated around York's Hollow and along Bowen Bridge Road between Gregory Terrace and Breakfast Creek, which has been important in the evolution of Brisbane's and Queensland's history. This area includes the residential, ecclesiastic and educational structures along Gregory Terrace overlooking Victoria Park, Bowen Park, an early tram shelter shed adjacent to Bowen Park along Bowen Bridge Road, the RNA Grounds, the former Exhibition Building at the northeast corner of Gregory Terrace and Bowen Bridge Road, the Exhibition Railway, Victoria Park, Centenary Pool, the Electricity Sub-station at the northwest corner of Bowen Bridge Road and Gregory Terrace, Victoria Park Golf Course, the former Victoria Park Golf Clubhouse, Royal Brisbane Hospital, and the Herston Medical School.

The place is important in demonstrating the principal characteristics of a particular class of cultural places.

Bowen Park is important for its various historical layers of design, demonstrating the development of garden design and the changes in focus and priorities of the garden activities. The Park is important for its design and aesthetic expression of the gardenesque, Edwardian and Modern park styles. The ornamental flower beds remaining from the 1914–1917 period designed by Henry Moore and the 1950s work by Harry Oakman are substantially intact and demonstrate the decorative features popular in garden and park development of the late nineteenth and early twentieth centuries. The location, style and planting of garden beds associated with shrubberies and hedges demonstrate the decorative Edwardian style and the Modern subtropical planting style of garden design.

The place is important because of its aesthetic significance.

Bowen Park occupies a prominent gateway location to the inner-city. Its ornamental planting beds, stone walls and attractive entrance gates contribute a bold and colourful presence to the streetscape. Other elements contributing to the historical and aesthetic qualities of the place include a 1914 bandstand rotunda, 1915 toilet block [one of the earliest municipal toilet blocks surviving in Brisbane], stone stairs and the northern and southern ends of the park, and drinking fountains thought to date to the 1950s.

The place has a strong or special association with a particular community or cultural group for social, cultural or spiritual reasons.

Bowen Park is important as one of Brisbane's first public gardens and has been in continuous use as a cultural and recreational destination since 1863.

The place has a special association with the life or work of a particular person, group or organisation of importance in Queensland's history.

Bowen Park is important for its association with Sir George Ferguson Bowen, the first governor of Queensland and first patron of the Queensland Acclimatisation Society.

Bowen Park is important for its association with William Soutter, overseer of the QAS gardens at Bowen Park from 1885 to 1898. Soutter influenced the development of horticulture in Queensland through his experimental work for the QAS, his contributions to shows and international exhibitions and his publications. Bowen Park is important for its association with the professional landscape gardener and horticulturist, Henry Moore. His design work in Brisbane includes areas of New Farm Park and Newstead Park.

Bowen Park is important for its association with Harry Oakman, Parks Superintendent for the Brisbane City Council 1948–63. Oakman was the first purpose-trained landscape architect to be employed by a government in Queensland. His contribution to the form and character of tropical landscape has influenced the design of most of the established public parks in Brisbane as well as Queen's Park, Townsville. His design work is typified in Bowen Park.
