= Quercus robusta =

Conservation status
- Data Deficient (IUCN 3.1)

Scientific classification
- Kingdom: Plantae
- Clade: Embryophytes
- Clade: Tracheophytes
- Clade: Spermatophytes
- Clade: Angiosperms
- Clade: Eudicots
- Clade: Rosids
- Order: Fagales
- Family: Fagaceae
- Genus: Quercus
- Subgenus: Quercus subg. Quercus
- Section: Quercus sect. Lobatae
- Species: Q. robusta

Binomial name
- Quercus robusta C.H.Mull.

Species of oak tree

Quercus robusta, also called robust oak, is a rare North American species of oak. It has been found only in the Chisos Mountains inside Big Bend National Park in western Texas.

Quercus robusta is a deciduous tree growing up to 13 metres (43 feet) tall. The bark is black or brown, the twigs dark reddish brown. The leaves are up to 12 centimetres (4 3/4 inches) long, with a few teeth or small lobes along the edges. The tree grows in moist, wooded canyons.
