= Acclimatisation society =

Association dedicated to introducing non-native species

Acclimatisation societies were voluntary associations, founded in the 19th and 20th centuries, that encouraged the introduction of non-native species in various places around the world, in the hope that they would acclimatise and adapt to their new environments. The societies formed during the colonial era, when Europeans began to settle in numbers in unfamiliar locations. One motivation for the activities of the acclimatisation societies was that introducing new species of plants and animals (mainly from Europe) would enrich the flora and fauna of target regions. The movement also sought to establish plants and animals that were familiar to Europeans, while also bringing exotic and useful foreign plants and animals to centres of European settlement.

== Background ==
It is now widely understood that introducing species to foreign environments is often harmful to native species and to their ecosystems. For example, in Australia the environment was seriously harmed by overgrazing by rabbits. In North America house sparrows displaced and killed native birds. In New Zealand, introduced mammals such as possums and cats became threats to indigenous plants, birds and lizards. Around the world, salamander populations are threatened by introduced fungal infections. Consequently, the deliberate introduction of new species is now illegal in some countries.

Alfred Russel Wallace attempted to define acclimatisation in his contribution on the subject in the Encyclopædia Britannica, 11th edition (1911). Wallace tried to differentiate the concept from other terms, such as "domestication" and "naturalisation". He noted that a domesticated animal could live in environments controlled by humans. Naturalisation, he suggested, included the process of acclimatisation, which involved "gradual adjustment". The idea, at least in France, was associated with Lamarckism, and Wallace noted that some, such as Charles Darwin, denied the possibility of forcing individual animals to adjust. However, Wallace pointed out that there was the possibility that there were variations among individuals and so some could have the ability to adapt to new environments.

== By region ==
=== France ===
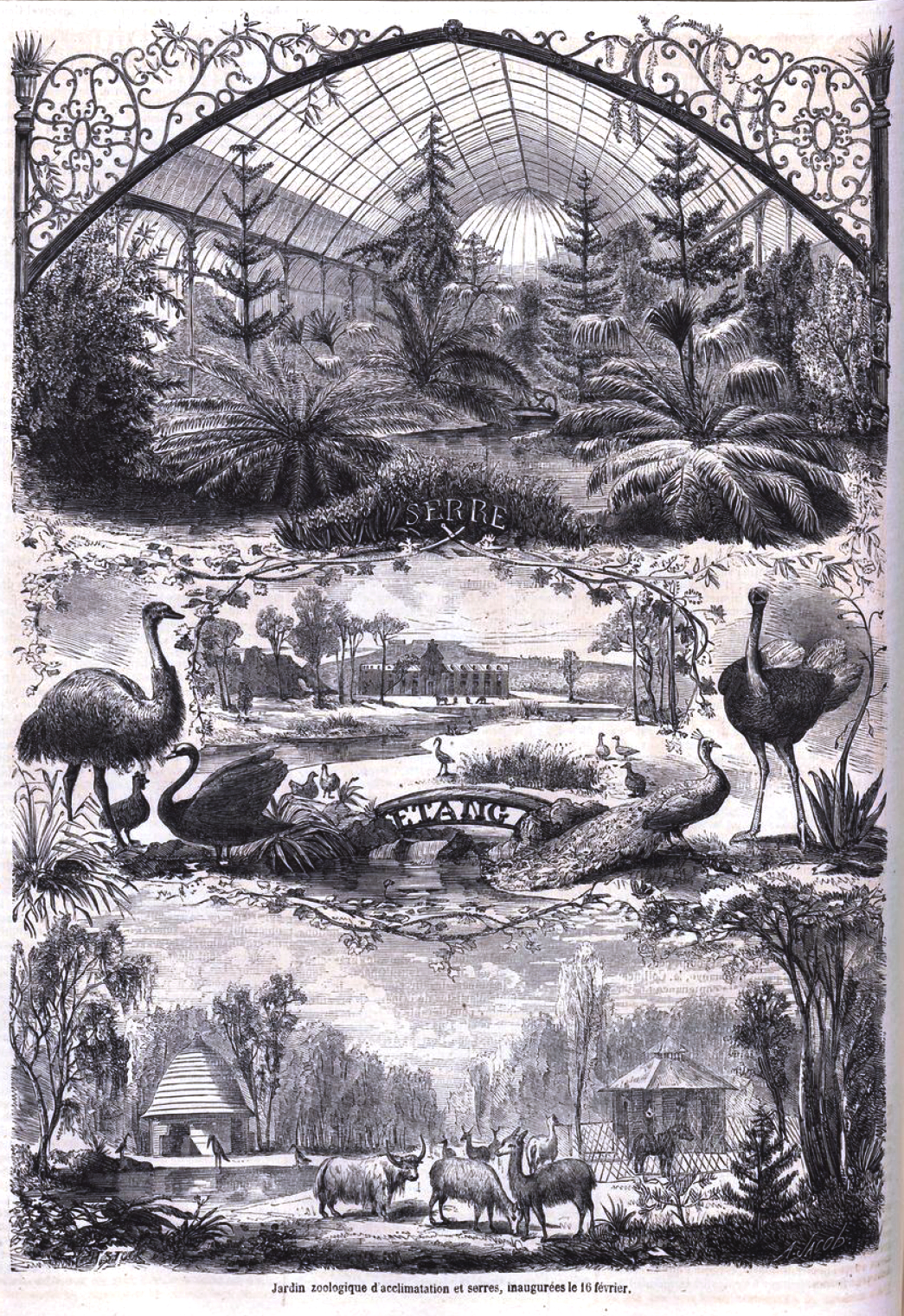
The Jardin d'Acclimatation in Paris in 1861

The first acclimatisation society was La Societé Zoologique d'Acclimatation, founded in Paris by Isidore Geoffroy Saint-Hilaire, on 10 May 1854. It was essentially an offshoot of the National Museum of Natural History in Paris, and the other staff included Jean Louis Armand de Quatrefages, Antoine César Becquerel and his son Alexandre. Saint-Hilaire subscribed to the Lamarckian idea that humans and animals could be forced to adapt to new environments. The French society established a branch in Algeria, as well as the Jardin d'Acclimatation in Paris in 1861, to showcase not just new animals and plants but also people from other lands.

Rewards in the form of medals were offered for anyone in the colonies who established breeding animals. The rules were that at least six specimens had to be maintained, with at least two instances of breeding in captivity. After Saint-Hilaire's death in 1861, the Society was headed by Édouard Drouyn de Lhuys, foreign minister to Napoleon III, and many of the functionaries were diplomats who established ties with officers in the colonies both French and foreign. Franco-British as well as Franco-Australian ties were involved in the movements of plants and animals. Australian acacias, for instance, were introduced in Algeria by the French, and by the British in South Africa. François Laporte, naturalist and consul in Melbourne, and Ferdinand von Mueller of the Acclimatisation Society of Victoria, were involved in the transfer of many plant species out of Australia. In some cases, those movements were not direct but via Paris and Kew.

=== Britain ===
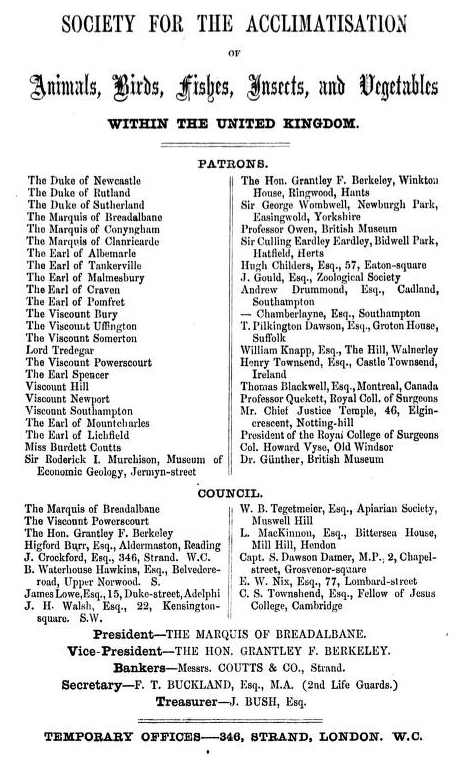
Members of the British Society in 1861

The British acclimatisation society originated from an idea proposed by the management of The Field magazine. A meeting was held on 21 January 1859, at the London Tavern on Bishopsgate Street. The attendees included Richard Owen at the head of the table, and the servings included a large pike, American partridges, a young bean goose and an African eland. At the meeting, Mitchell and others suggested that many of those exotic animals could live in the British wilderness. A few days later, Owen wrote to The Times, praising the taste of the eland and advocating animal introductions.

On 26 June 1860, another meeting was held and the Acclimatisation Society was formally founded in London. A year later, the Secretary to the Society, Frank Buckland, a popular naturalist known for his taste in exotic meats, noted the "success" of the Society in introducing peafowl, common pheasant, European swans, starlings and linnets into Australia, through the efforts of Edward Wilson. One of the supporters of the Society was Burdett Coutts. Other such societies spread quickly around the world, particularly to European colonies in the Americas, Australia and New Zealand. In many instances they existed both as societies for the study of natural history as well as to improve the success rate of introduced species. In 1850, English sparrows were introduced into America, and Eugene Schieffelin introduced starlings in 1890.

=== Australia and New Zealand ===
The appeal of acclimatisation societies in the British settler colonies, particularly Australia and New Zealand, was the belief that the addition of European species would improve the natural environments. There was also an element of nostalgia in the desire of European colonists to see familiar species. At the time, the acclimatisation societies did not see themselves as opposed to the conservation of native species. In fact, acclimitisation societies often advocated for protection of native game, just as conservation groups likewise supported protections for many introduced species.

The Acclimatisation Society of Victoria was established in 1861. Speaking to the Society, George Bennett pointed out how it was important to have such an organisation, citing the example of the Earl of Knowsley, who had been conducting successful experiments in private, the results of which had been lost with his death. A major proponent of importing and exporting trees and plants was Ferdinand von Mueller. Introductions of commercially valuable species or game species were also made. In some instances, the results were disastrous, such as the economic and ecological disaster of introducing rabbits to Australia or possums to New Zealand. The dire effects were rapidly felt and a Rabbit Nuisance Act was passed in New Zealand in 1876. To make matters worse, there was a suggestion that weasels and stoats should be imported to control the rabbits. Despite warnings from Alfred Newton and others, the predators were introduced, which Herbert Guthrie-Smith described as an "attempt to correct a blunder by a crime."

In 1893, T. S. Palmer of California wrote about the dangers of animal introduction. In 1906, the editors of the Avicultural Magazine were decidedly against the idea of bird introductions. The emergence of the field of ecology transformed expert and public opinion on introductions and gave way to new rules. Quarantine regulations began to be set up instead. Beginning in New Zealand, some of the acclimatisation societies transformed themselves into fish and game organisations.

=== United States ===
Introduction of the Nile hippopotamus to the United States on a massive scale was proposed by Louisiana Representative Robert F. Broussard on March 24, 1910. The purpose was supposed to increase the American production and accessibility of meat, as well as to combat the spread of another previously introduced invasive species, the water hyacinth. The hippos were supposed to feast on water hyacinth and then be slaughtered for meat by ranchers. Broussard did not mention or wasn't aware of how dangerous Nile hippos are, as they kill around 500 people a year. Additionally, water hyacinth isn't seen as an attractive meal by herbivores, having a body composed in 95% of water and very little nutrition. The plan did not come to fruition. Other animals were also suggested for introduction, such as rhinoceroses or antelopes. Others who supported the introduction of hippopotamuses were Fritz Duquesne and William Newton Irwin.

== See also ==
- Introduced species
- Invasive species
- Assisted migration
- Acclimatisation societies in New Zealand
- American Acclimatization Society
- Queensland Acclimatisation Society
- South Australian Acclimatization and Zoological Society
