= Royal National Agricultural and Industrial Association of Queensland =

Australian agriculture association

- Formation: 1875; 151 years ago
- Type: Body Corporate
- Purpose: Promotion of agricultural, pastoral, horticultural, industrial, manufacturing and cultural activities of Queensland.
- Headquarters: Brisbane Showgrounds
- Region served: Queensland
- President: David Thomas
- Website: https://www.rna.org.au

The Royal National Agricultural and Industrial Association of Queensland (RNA) is an organisation which aims to promote and encourage the development of agricultural, industrial, manufacturing and cultural resources of Queensland, Australia. The RNA owns and operates the Brisbane Exhibition Ground, situated 1.6 kilometres from the Brisbane central business district.

The RNA runs the annual Royal Queensland Show, commonly known as the Brisbane Exhibition or by the contraction Ekka, for 9 days each year in August at the RNA Showgrounds. The Ekka is the largest event in Queensland, attracting an average of 400,000 people each year to its competitions, exhibits and entertainments. The highest attendance was in 1981 (the first year when the Show dates did not coincide with the Queensland school August vacation) with 891,232 attending.

The RNA also runs the Royal Queensland Awards, a set of competitions to honour the best food and drink from Queensland.

In addition to its own events, the RNA provides the showgrounds and The Royal International Convention Centre (Royal ICC) as a venue for over 150 other events each year, such as music festivals, trade shows and sporting events. In the absence of events, the showgrounds can also be used as parking.

== Awards ==
The RNA was inducted into the Queensland Business Leaders Hall of Fame in 2012, in recognition of the Royal Queensland Show’s iconic standing and its outstanding contribution to Queensland industry and society for 136 years.
