= List of Art Deco architecture in Oceania =

This is a list of buildings that are examples of Art Deco in Oceania:

== Australia ==
=== Australian Capital Territory ===
- Australian War Memorial, Campbell, Australian Capital Territory, 1941
- National Film & Sound Archive (formerly The Australian Institute of Anatomy), Acton, Australian Capital Territory, 1931

=== New South Wales ===
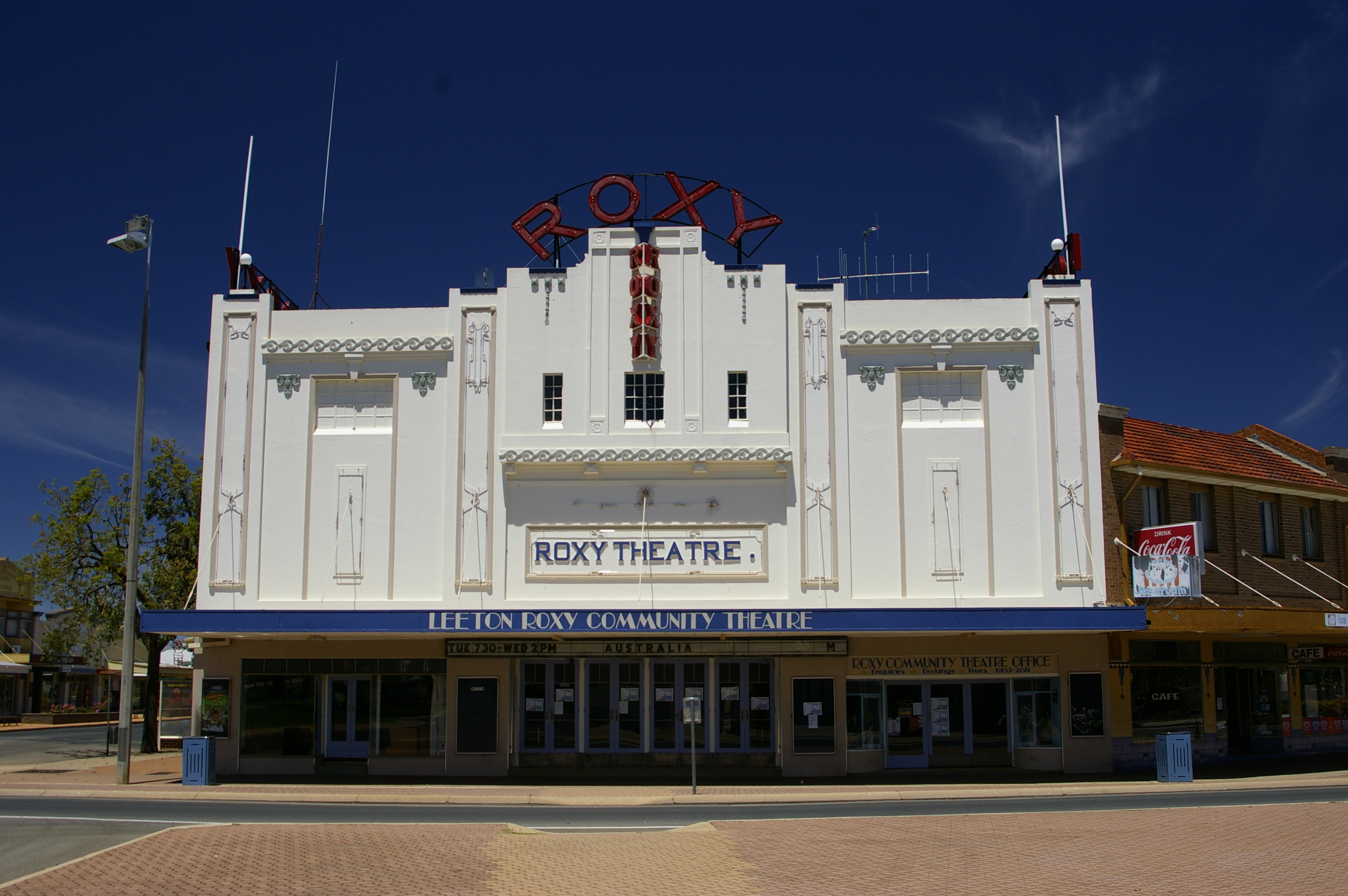
Roxy Theatre, Leeton

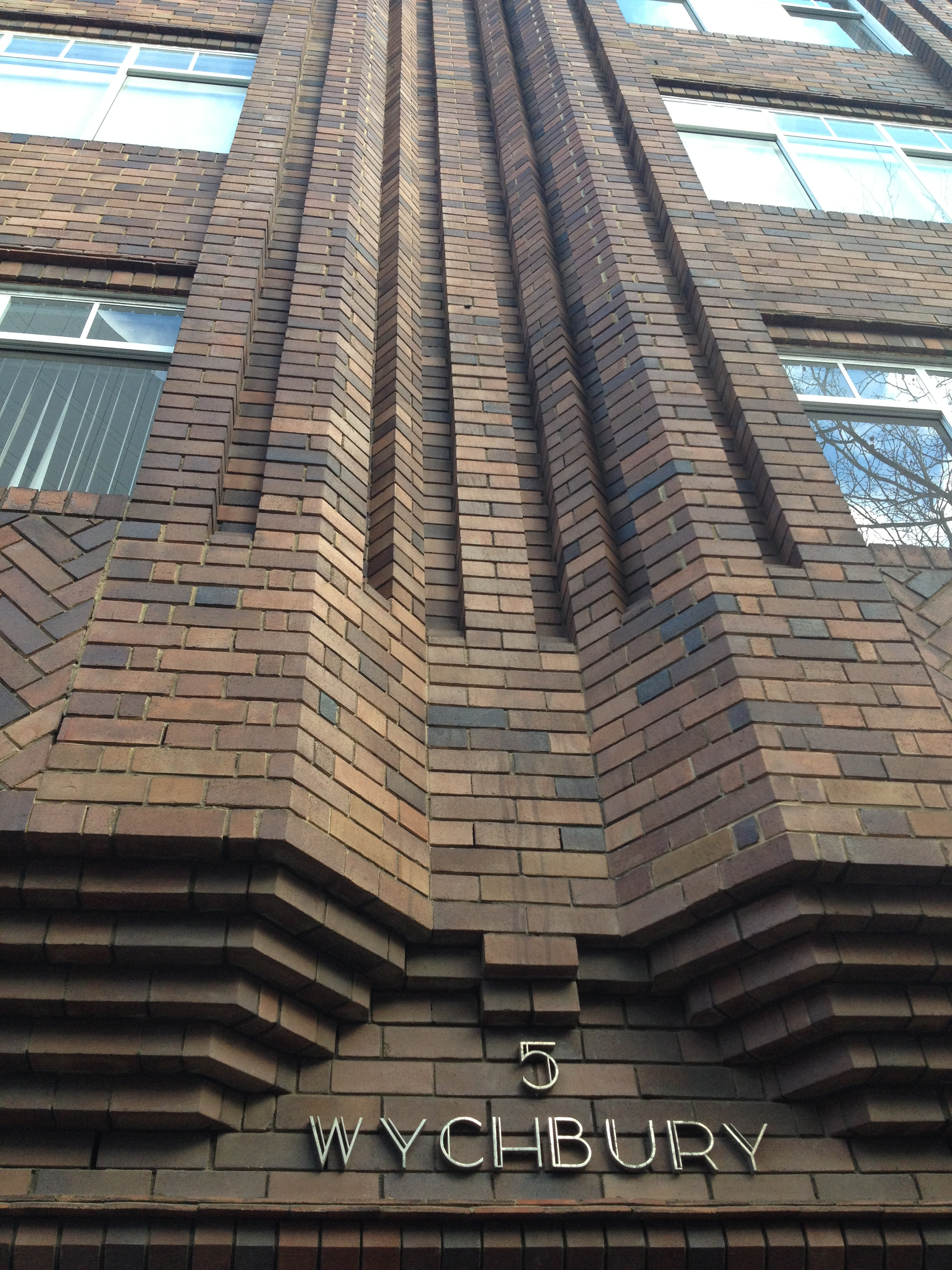
Wychbury, Sydney, 1934

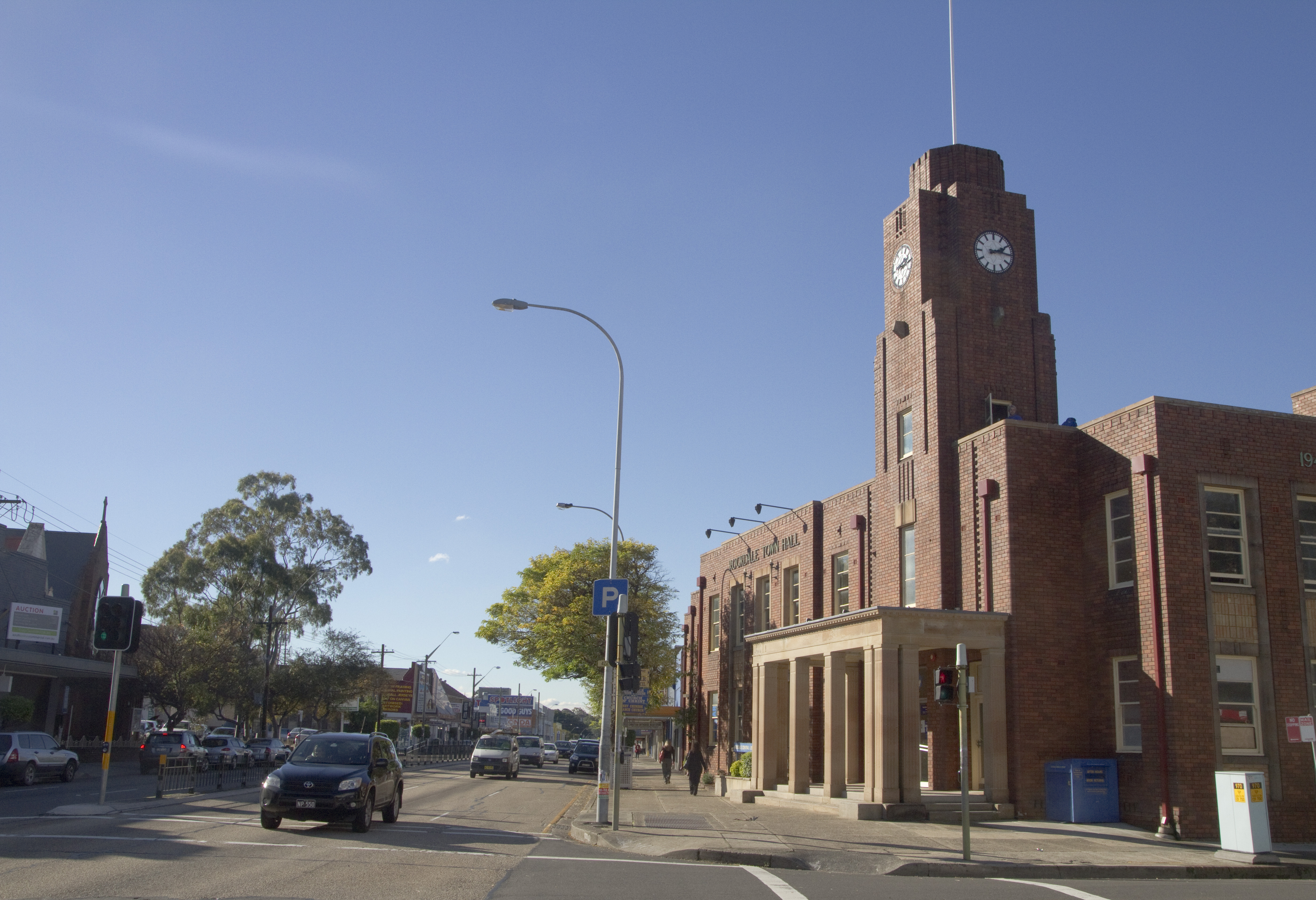
Rockdale Town Hall, Rockdale

- Colonial Mutual Life Building, Newcastle, 1940
- Hydro Majestic Hotel, Medlow Bath
- Leeton District Lands Office, Leeton, 1937
- Montreal Community Theatre, Tumut, 1930
- Roxy Community Theatre, Leeton, 1933
- Roxy Theatre and Peters Greek Cafe Complex, Bingara, 1936
- University House (Newcastle), (Emil Sodersten), Newcastle, 1939

==== Suburban Sydney ====
- Albury Hotel, Darlinghurst
- Berlei House, Regent Street, Chippendale, 1922
- Bilyard House, Elizabeth Bay
- Caversham Court, Elizabeth Bay
- Charing Cross Hotel, Waverley
- Chatsbury Apartments, Elizabeth Bay
- Cherwood Apartments, Elizabeth Bay
- Enmore Theatre, Newtown, 1910, 1920
- Erskineville Town Hall, Erskineville, 1938
- Golden Barley Hotel, Enmore
- Holy Cross Church, Woollahra
- Light Brigade Hotel, Paddington
- Mahratta, Wahroonga, 1941
- Marlborough Hall, Elizabeth Bay
- Melrose Apartments, Elizabeth Bay
- Minerva Theatre, Potts Point, 1939
- Niterider Theatre Restaurant, Homebush
- North Annandale Hotel, Annandale
- The Oxley Apartments, Elizabeth Bay
- Park View, Potts Point
- Pembroke Hall, Elizabeth Bay
- Petersham Town Hall, Petersham, 1938
- Ritz Cinema, Randwick, 1937
- Robin Hood Hotel, Waverley
- Rockdale Town Hall, Rockdale, 1940
- Roxy Theatre, Parramatta, 1930
- Royal Court, Darlinghurst
- The Rutland Apartments, Darlinghurst
- Somerset Apartments, Elizabeth Bay
- St Peters Town Hall, Sydenham, 1927
- Surf Life Saving Club, Cronulla, 1940
- Tahoe Apartments, Elizabeth Bay
- Tea Gardens Hotel, Bondi Junction
- Trent Bridge, Potts Point
- Unicorn Hotel, Paddington
- United Cinemas, Collaroy
- Valhalla Cinema, Glebe
- Werrington Apartments, Potts Point
- Winston Apartments, Elizabeth Bay
- The Wroxton Apartments, Elizabeth Bay
- Wynchbury Apartments, Potts Point

==== Sydney ====
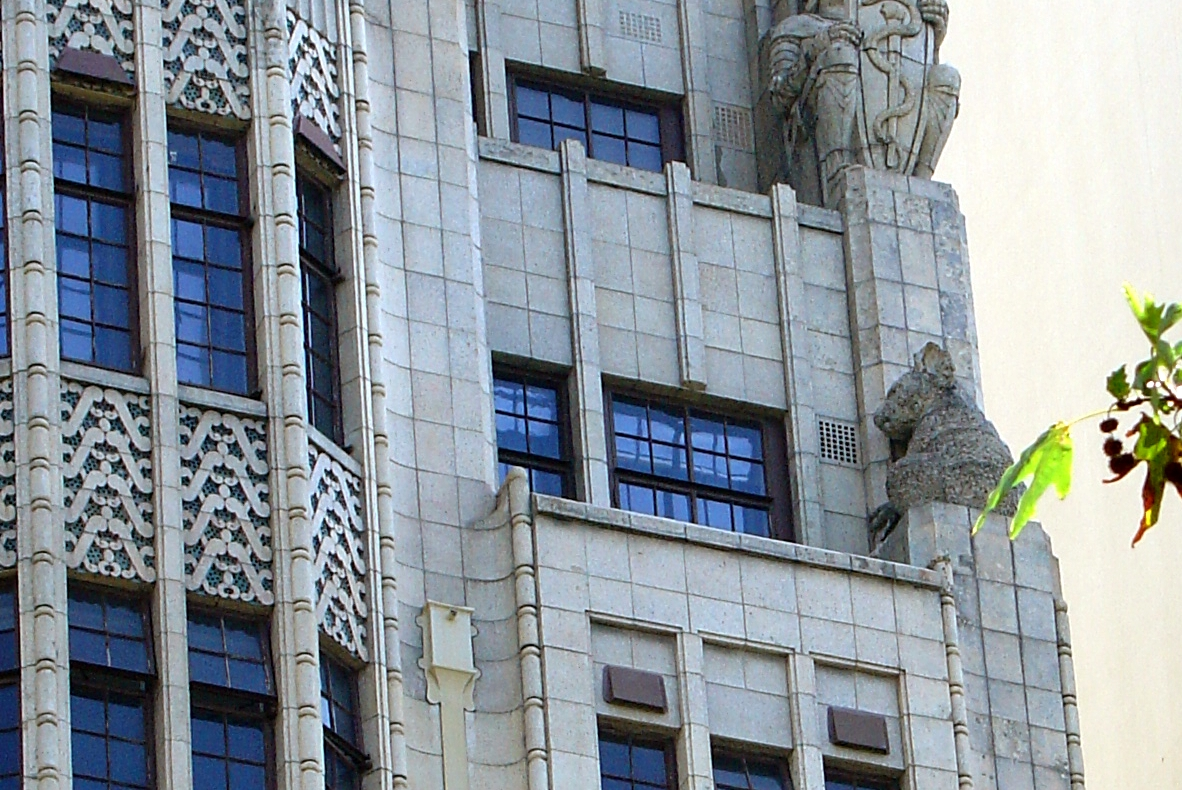
AMA House (Australian Medical Association House), Sydney, NSW, Australia (with koala detail)

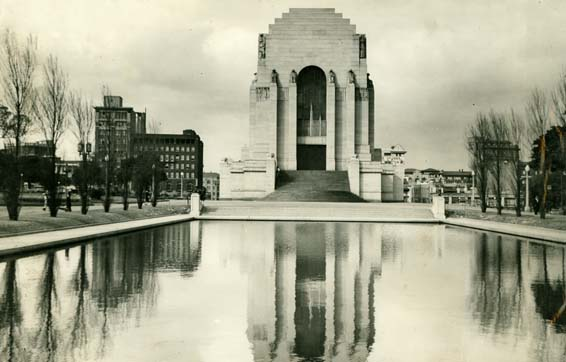
Anzac Memorial, Hyde Park, Sydney

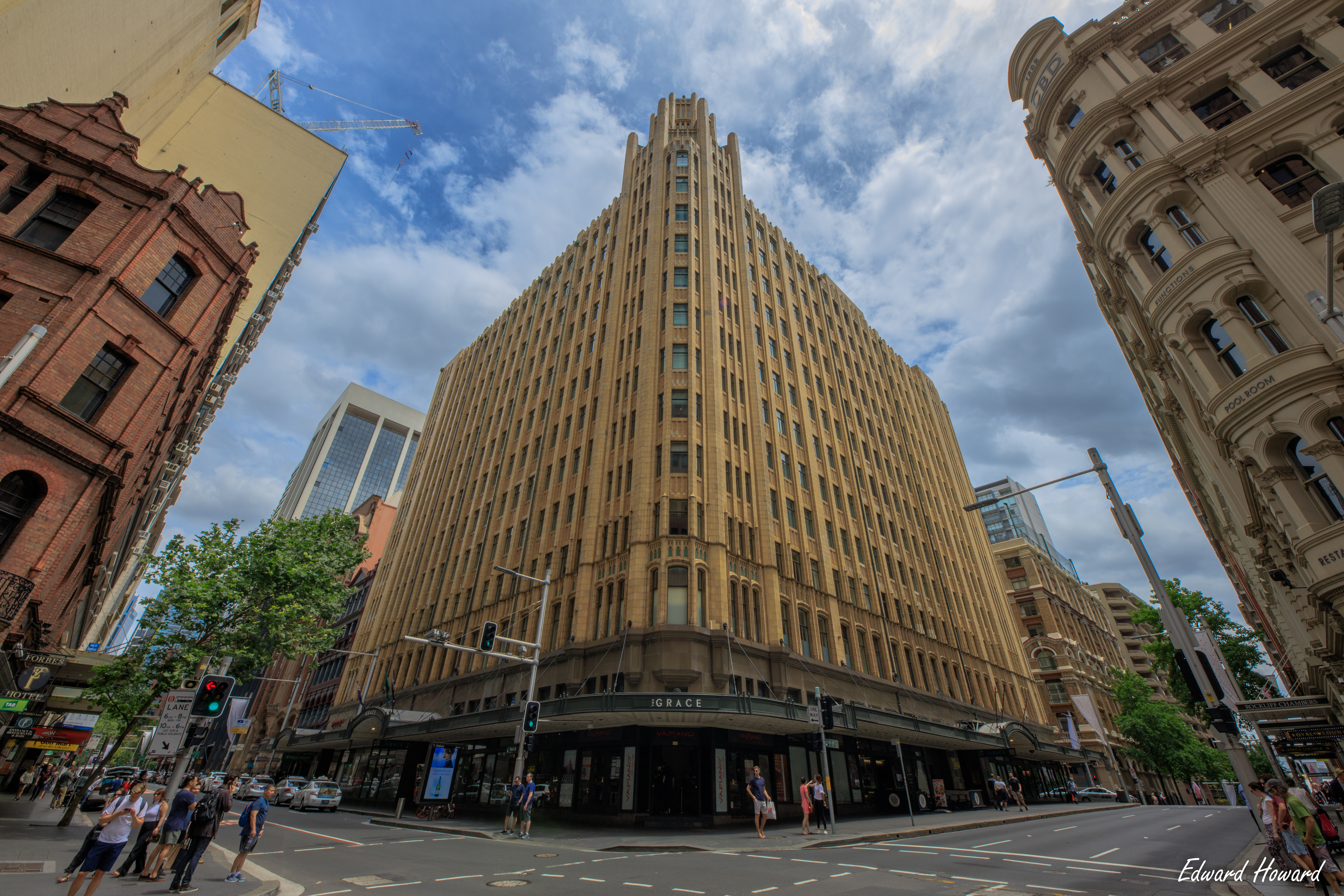
Grace Building, Sydney

- Adereham Hall, Sydney, 1934
- AFT House, Sydney, 1940
- AMA House, Sydney, Macquarie Street, Sydney, 1930
- Amalgamated Wireless Australia (AWA) Building, York Street, Sydney, 1939
- Anzac War Memorial, (Bruce Dellit), Sydney, 1934
- Archibald Fountain, Sydney, 1926
- Asbestos House, York Street, Sydney
- Australian Catholic Insurance Building, York Street, Sydney
- AWA Tower, Sydney, 1937–1939
- Belgenny Flats, Sydney 1938
- Birtley Towers, Sydney, 1934
- BMA House, (Fowell & McConnel), Sydney, 1930
- Byron Hall, Sydney, 1928
- Cahors, Sydney, 1940
- Canon House, Sydney, 1925 (Demolished 2008)
- Challis House, Martin Place, Sydney, 1906, 1936
- Charles Plaza, (Hennessey & Hennessey), Sydney, 1937
- City Mutual Life Assurance Building, Hunter Street, Sydney, 1936
- Civic Hotel, Sydney
- Claridge Apartments, Sydney, 1939
- Commonwealth Bank Building, Roseville, Sydney
- Commonwealth Trading Bank Building, Martin Place, Sydney, 1933
- Concord Repatriation Hospital, Concord, Sydney, 1942
- Crest Cinema, Granville, Sydney
- Delfin House, (Bruce Dellit), Sydney, 1940
- Department of Railways, Sydney, 1936
- Elizabeth House, Sydney, 1930
- Eltham, Elizabeth Bay, Sydney
- Footprints Westend Sydney, Sydney, 1929
- Franconia, Sydney, 1930
- Gowrie Gate, Potts Point, Sydney
- Grace Building, Sydney, 1930
- Grand United Building, Sydney, 1938
- Greenland Centre, apartments, Sydney
- Hayden Orpheum, Cremorne, Sydney
- Huntingdon Apartments, Elizabeth Bay, Sydney
- James Hardie House, (Robertson & Marks), Sydney, 1931
- Kanimbla Hall, Sydney, 1935
- King George V Memorial Hospital, Missenden Road, Camperdown, Sydney, 1941
- Kingsley Hall, Sydney, 1931
- Kyle House, (Bruce Dellit), Sydney, 1931
- Macleay Regis, Sydney, 1936
- Meudon, Sydney, 1940
- MLC Building, (Bates, Smart and McCutcheon), Sydney, 1937
- Mont Clair, Darlinghurst, Sydney
- Museum of Contemporary Art Australia, Sydney
- North Sydney Olympic Pool, North Sydney, 1936
- Onslow Gardens, Sydney, 1938
- Overseas Union Bank, Sydney, 1937
- Pacific House, Sydney, 1936
- Pioneer House, Sydney, 1930
- QBE Building (Emil Sodersten), Sydney, 1940
- St Margaret's Hospital, Bourke Street, Surry Hills, Sydney, 1910
- State Theatre Building, Sydney, 1929
- Swaab House, Sydney, 1935
- Sydney Water Head Office, Bathurst Street, Sydney; 1939 under redevelopment as part of the Greenland Centre Sydney
- Tara Apartments, Sydney, 1939
- Transport House, Sydney, 1936
- Waterboard Building, Sydney, 1939
- Westchester, Sydney, 1938
- Westminster Hotel Sydney
- The Wroxton, Sydney
- Wychbury, Sydney, 1934
- Wynyard House, Sydney

=== Queensland ===
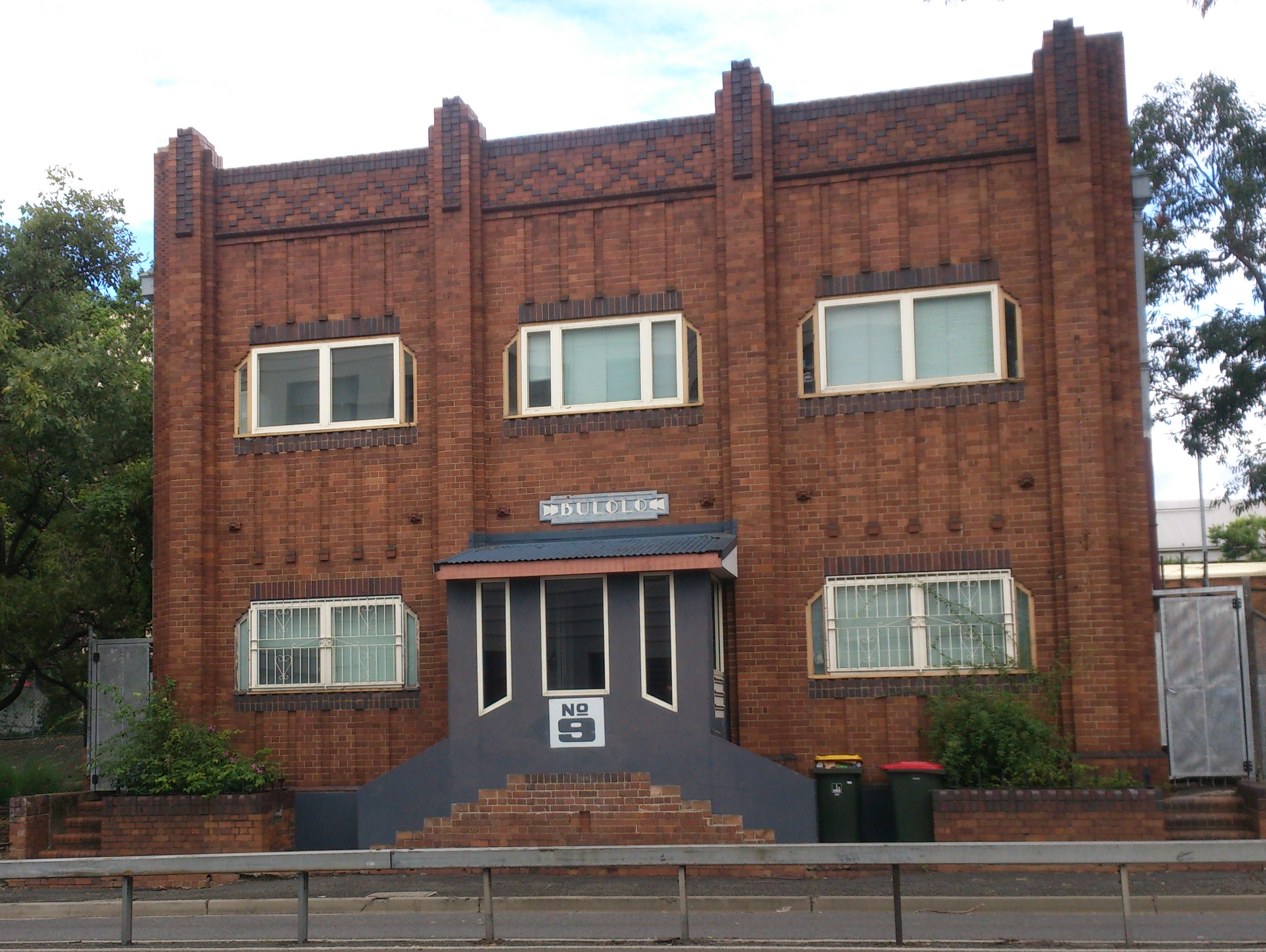
Bulolo Flats, Fortitude Valley

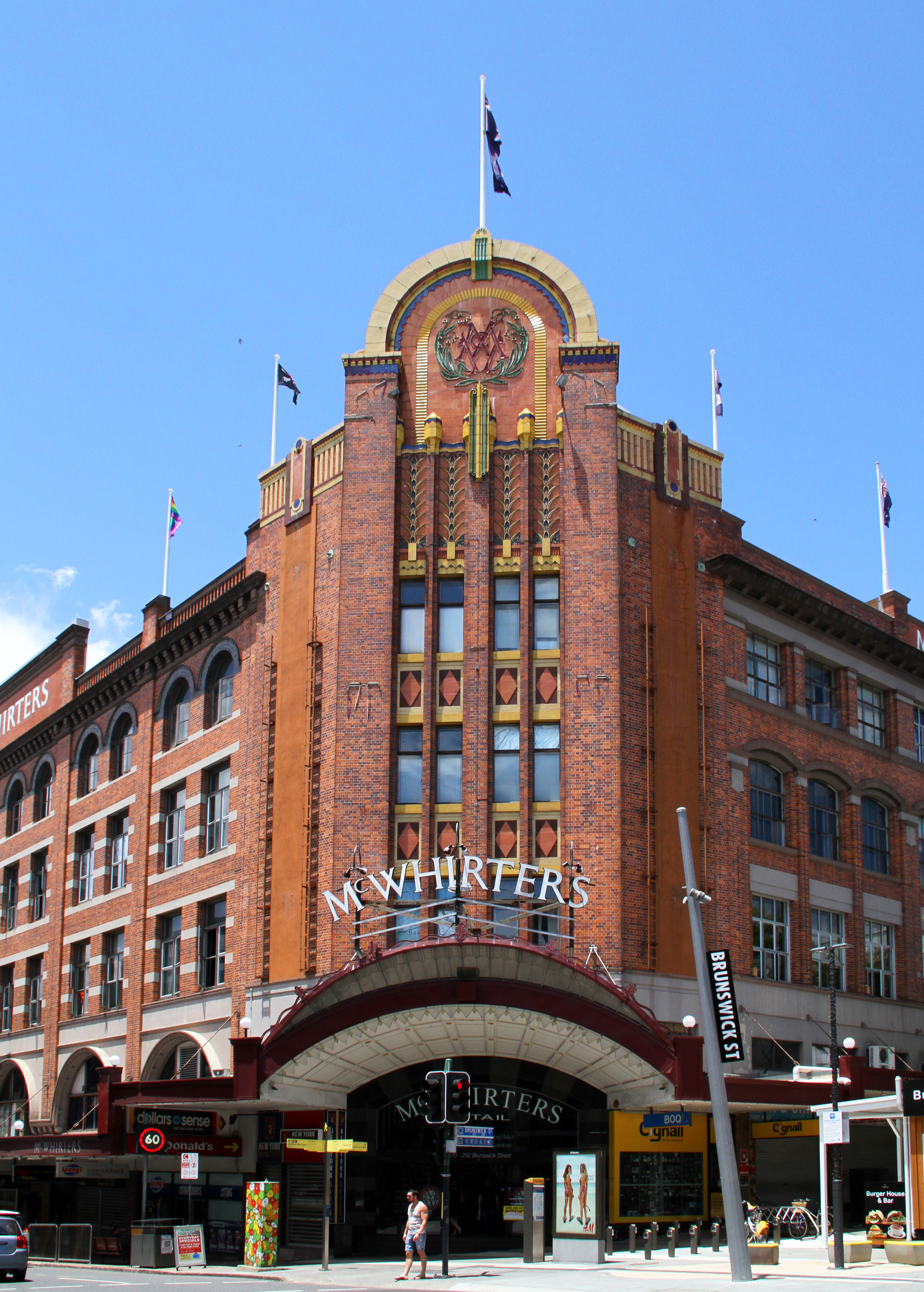
McWhirters Shopping Centre, Brisbane

- Avalon Theatre, St Lucia, Brisbane, 1923
- Bellevue Court, Clayfield, Brisbane
- Bulolo Flats, Fortitude Valley, Brisbane, Queensland, 1934
- Colonial Mutual Life Building, Brisbane, 1931
- Coronet Flats, New Farm, 1933
- Empire Theatre, Toowoomba, 1911, 1933
- Filma Flats, Dutton Park, Brisbane, Queensland, 1934
- Forgan Smith Building, University of Queensland, Brisbane
- Hotel Cecil, Southport, 1938
- Jubilee Bridge (Harding Frew), (Old), Innisfail, 1932
- Jubilee Bridge (New), Innisfail, 2011
- McWhirters Shopping Centre, Fortitude Valley, Brisbane, 1931
- Osbourne Hotel, Fortitude Valley, Brisbane, 1864, 1920s
- Paragon Theatre, Childers, Bundaberg Region, 1927
- Shell House, Brisbane, 1933
- Southport Town Hall, Southport, Gold Coast City, 1935
- Tattersalls Club (Queen Street facade and interiors), Brisbane, 1925–1949
- Warrina Cinemas, Townsville, 1973
- William Jolly Bridge, (Harding Frew), Brisbane, 1932

=== South Australia ===
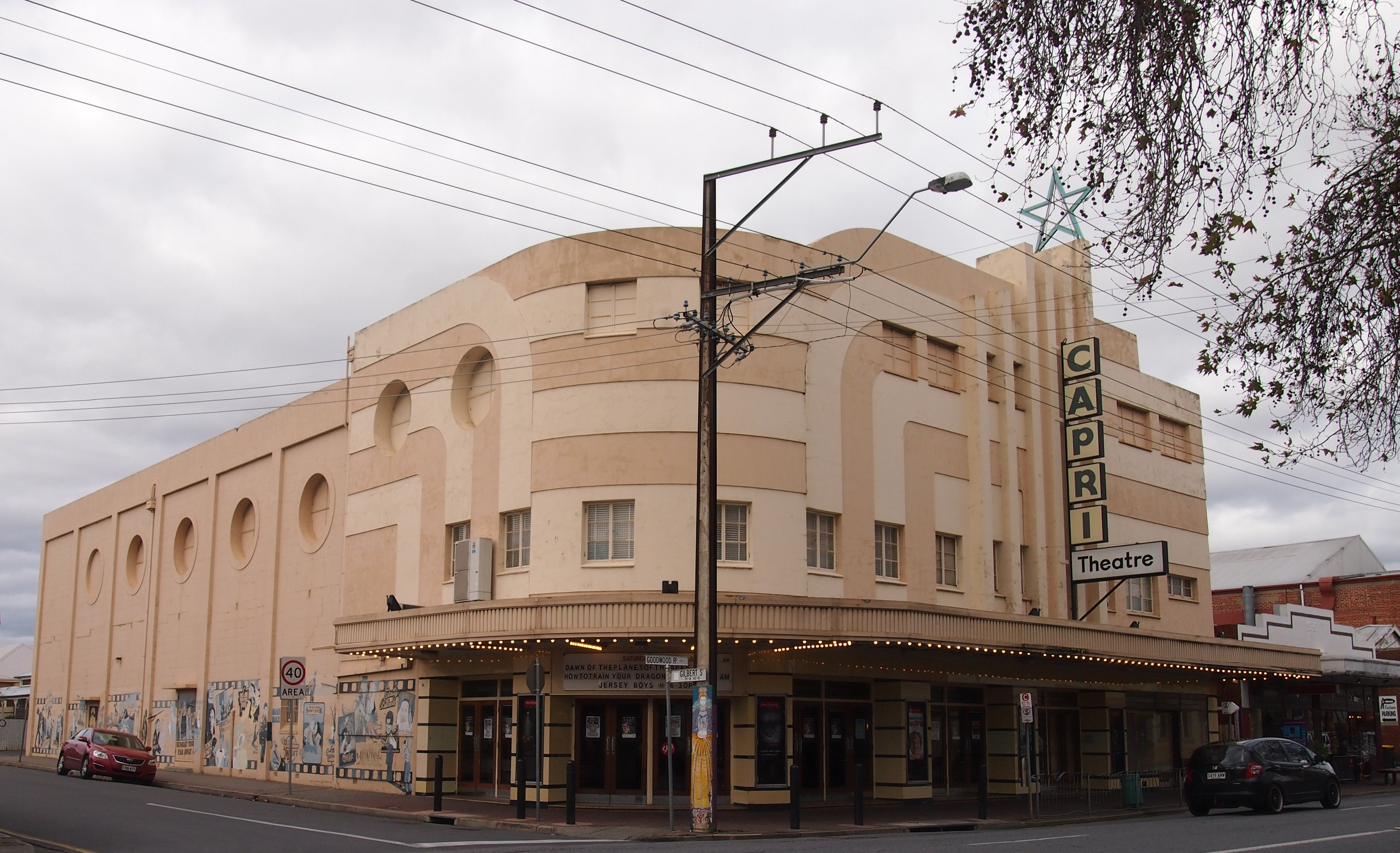
Capri Theatre, Goodwood

- Adelaide High School, West Terrace, Adelaide 1947-1948
- Adelaide Symphony Orchestra headquarters (Former West's Cinema), 91–93 Hindley Street, Adelaide 1939
- AMP Building, (former), 23 King William Street, Adelaide 1936
- Arab Steed Hotel, 241 Hutt Street, Adelaide
- Archives Pavilion, Adelaide Showgrounds, Goodwood Road, Wayville 1936
- Astor Hotel, 437 Pulteney Street, Adelaide
- Australian Institute of Marine Engineers, 22 Divett Street, Port Adelaide 1935
- Avant Garde Building, 66 Currie Street, Adelaide 1937
- Backpack Oz Building, 144 Wakefield Street, Adelaide
- Bank of Adelaide (Former), 10 Belvidere Road, Saddleworth 1939
- Bank SA Building, (McMichael and Harris), Adelaide, 1943
- Bank SA Kiosk, Adelaide Showgrounds, Goodwood Road, Wayville 1936
- Bayview Hotel, Corner Forsyth & Farrell Street, Whyalla
- Beacon Lodge Apartments, 101 Moseley Street, Glenelg, 1937
- Beverley Residential House, 40 Anzac Highway, Everard Park 1938
- Bristol Court flats, 1 Bristol Street, Glenelg, 1940
- Bruceden Court Apartments, 2A Deepdeene Avenue, Westbourne Park 1941
- Campbelltown Community Centre, Newton Road, Campbelltown 1937
- Capri Theatre, Goodwood, Unley, 1941
- Car Park, 14 Moore Street, Adelaide
- City of West Torrens Council Chambers, 165 Sir Donald Bradman Drive, Hilton
- Clarkson Building, 136 St Vincent Street, 1938
- Commercial Premises, 226 Victoria Road, Largs Bay
- Commercial Premises, 233 Pulteney Street, Adelaide
- Commercial SA Building, 11 Bentham Street, Adelaide 1934
- Country Arts SA Building, McLaren Parade, Port Adelaide 1936
- Cranbrook Apartments, 179 Goodwood Road, Millswood
- Dalgety Woolstore Building, 35 Baker Street, Port Adelaide 1938
- Deepacre Apartments, 287 Melbourne Street, North Adelaide, 1942
- Duke of Leinster Building, 23 Payneham Road, College Park
- Education Development Centre (formerly Hindmarsh Town Hall), Hindmarsh, 1936
- Eleanor Harrald Building, Lot Fourteen, Frome Road, Adelaide, 1954-1955
- Everard Court Apartments, 46 Anzac Highway, Everard Park 1939
- Factory, 34 Manchester Street, Mile End South
- Felicitas Apartments, Wellington Square, North Adelaide
- Fire Station (former), 26 Gordon Street Glenelg, 1938
- Fletcher Jones Building, 35 Hindley Street, Adelaide 1939
- Former Coles Building, Rundle Mall/Charles Street, Adelaide 1939
- Gilbert Place Apartments, 31 and 33 Gilbert Place, Adelaide 1936
- Gladstone Building, 36 Waymouth Street, Adelaide 1938
- Glenelg Dry Cleaners, 37 Cliff Street, Glengowrie
- Globe Hotel, 138-144 St.Vincent Street, Port Adelaide, refaced around 1930
- Greenways Apartments, 41-45 King William Road, North Adelaide
- Haigh Mansions Apartments, Esplanade, Henley Beach
- Hampstead Hotel, 143 North East Road, Collinswood
- Harbors Board Building, 129 Lipson Street, Port Adelaide 1934
- Hartrotd Building,(former Dulux paint factory), 67 Lipson Street, Port Adelaide 1938-1940
- Hindmarsh Incinerator, (Walter Burley Griffin Incinerator), Burley Griffin Boulevard, Brompton 1935
- Hindmarsh Municipal Band Studio, Manton Street, Hindmarsh 1939
- Holdfast Bay Council Chambers Brighton 1937
- Hotel Royal, 180 Henley Beach Road, Torrensville
- Howie & Organ Engineering Pty Ltd (former Gibb & Miller Ltd Engineers), 290 Commercial Road, Port Adelaide
- Institute of Medical & Veterinary Science Building, Frome Road, Adelaide 1942
- International Hotel-Motel, 40 Ellen Street, Port Pirie
- Kia-Ora Apartments, 3 Victoria Street, Goodwood, 1941
- Kidman Entrance Gates, Adelaide Showgrounds, Rose Terrace, Wayville 1937
- Klemzig Pioneer Cemetery Gates, Klemzig, 1936
- Laubman and Pank Optometrists, & Gritti Palace 62 Gawler Place, Adelaide 1938
- Lights Buildings, Light Square, Adelaide
- Lloyd Wiggins & Co. Ltd (former). Auction Rooms, Penaluna Place, Adelaide
- Lobethal Centennial Hall, 36 Main Street, Lobethal, 1936
- Marion Council Chambers (former - now private residence), Sturt Road, Marion 1937
- Masonic Centre, Commercial Road, Port Adelaide 1928
- Mayfair Hotel (former Colonial Mutual Life Building), Corner of King William and Hindley Streets, Adelaide 1935-1936
- Minlaton Town Hall, 57 Main Street, Minlaton
- Mitcham Council Chambers, 131 Belair Road, Torrens Park, 1934
- Mobil Service Station, 132 Semaphore Road, Exeter
- Morea Apartments, Glenelg South 1939
- Myponga Hall, Hansen Street, Myponga, 1938
- National War Memorial, corner North Terrace and Kintore Avenue, Adelaide
- Oakbank Hotel, Main Street, Oakbank

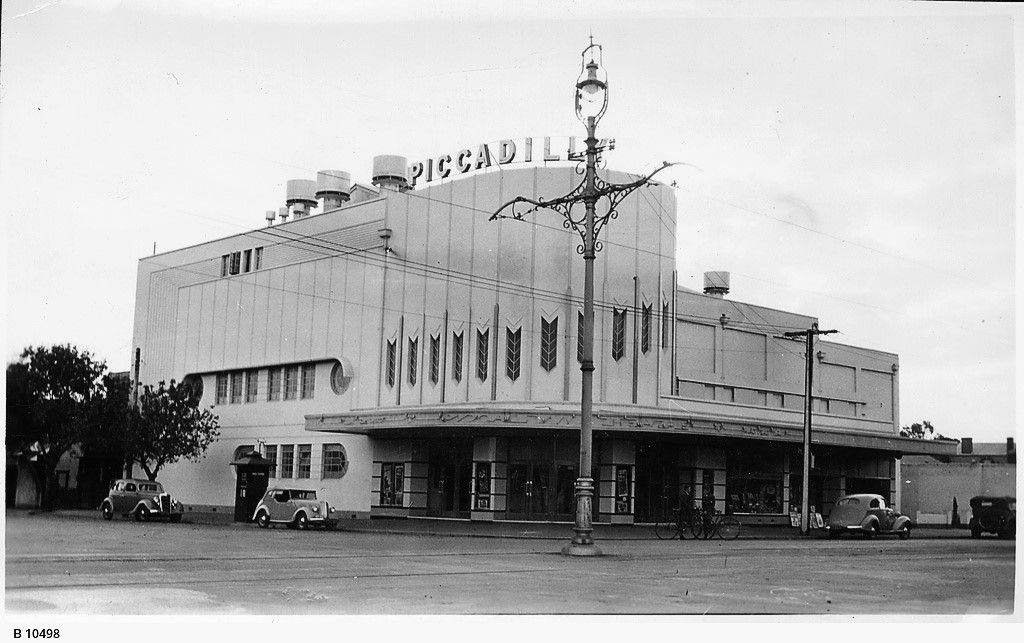
Piccadilly Theatre, North Adelaide, 1941 (built 1940)

- Pennsylvania Apartments, Glenelg South
- Piccadilly Cinema, O’Connell Street, North Adelaide, 1940
- Port Adelaide Council Chambers, Port Adelaide 1940
- Prince of Wales Hotel, 215 Port Road, Queenstown 1936
- Regal Theatre (formerly The Chelsea), Kensington Park, 1925
- Regal Theatre, 67-73A Murray Street, Gawler 1935
- Renmark Hotel, Murray Avenue, Renmark
- Residential Apartments, 16a Martens Street, Fullarton, 1941
- Residential House, 1 St. Michaels Road, Mitcham, 1937
- Residential House, 12 Westall Street, Flinders Park, 1955
- Residential House, 122 Grant Avenue, Toorak Gardens
- Residential House, 14 William Street, Glenelg East, 1937
- Residential House, 15 Victoria Avenue, Unley Park
- Residential House, 20 Oaklands Road, Somerton Park 1951
- Residential House, 3 Prospect Road, Prospect 1938
- Residential House, 307 Torrens Road, Croydon Park
- Residential House, 31 Broadway, Glenelg 1941
- Residential House, 33 Chelmsford Avenue, Millswood, 1935
- Residential House, 33 Pier Street Glenelg 1940
- Residential House, 373 Grange Road, Findon, 1953-1954
- Residential House, 4 Bickford Terrace, Somerton Park, 1939
- Residential House, 51 Main Street, Beverley, 1955-1956
- Residential House, 6-8 Allen Grove, Unley, 1940
- Residential House, 74 May Street, Woodville West, 1953-1954
- Residential House, 87 Torrens Road, Brompton, 1938
- Retten Apartments, Glenelg 1939
- Ridley Gates, Adelaide Showgrounds, Goodwood Road, Wayville 1933
- Risdon Hotel, 22 Moppett Road, Port Pirie West, 1938
- Rising Sun Pictures Building, 182 Pulteney Street, Adelaide
- Roxy Theatre, Anzac Highway, Everard Park 1937
- Rundle Buildings, Rundle Street East, Adelaide 1939
- S.D. Caputo & Sons Shop, 1 Main Road, Solomontown
- Sands and McDougall Building, 64 King William Street, 1934
- Seafarers Fools Café, 60B Broadway, Glenelg South
- Shandon Apartments, 88 Moseley Street, Glenelg 1940
- Shop (formerly Clarkson), 136 St Vincent Street, Port Adelaide, 1938
- Shop, 125 & 125A Military Road, Semaphore
- Shop, 32 Semaphore Rd, Semaphore, 1938
- Shop, 34 Semaphore Rd, Semaphore
- Shop, 744-746 Anzac Highway, Glenelg 1941
- Shop, 86-108 Glen Osmond Road, Parkside 1935
- Shop, 97 Jetty Road Glenelg 1939
- Shoreham Apartments, Glenelg 1938
- Soldiers Remembrance Hall (now BMG Art), 444 South Road, Marleston
- Star Theatres (former Theatre 62), 145 Sir Donald Bradman Drive, Hilton
- Stirling Flats, 2 Saltram Road, Glenelg, 1939
- Strathmerton, 53-55 Whyte Street, Glenelg South 1939
- Sussex Hotel, 68 Walkerville Terrace, Walkerville
- Synagogue, Synagogue Place, Adelaide, 1940
- Trevu Flats, 2 Torrens Square, Glenelg
- Tubemakers Building, Churchill Road, Kilburn 1939-1942
- Victa Cinema, 37-41 Ocean Street, Victor Harbor
- Victoria Park Race Gates, Rose Park
- Vogue Theatre, Belair Road, Hawthorn
- Walter Burley Griffin Incinerator, West Thebarton Road, West Thebarton 1937
- West Linton Apartments, 55 Tarlton Street, Somerton Park, 1940
- West Thebarton Hotel, South Road, Thebarton
- Westpac Building, (former), 2-6 King William Street, 1942
- Windmill Hotel, Main North Road, Prospect
- Woodlands Apartments, Jeffcott Street, North Adelaide
- Woodville Hotel, Port Road, Woodville

=== Tasmania ===
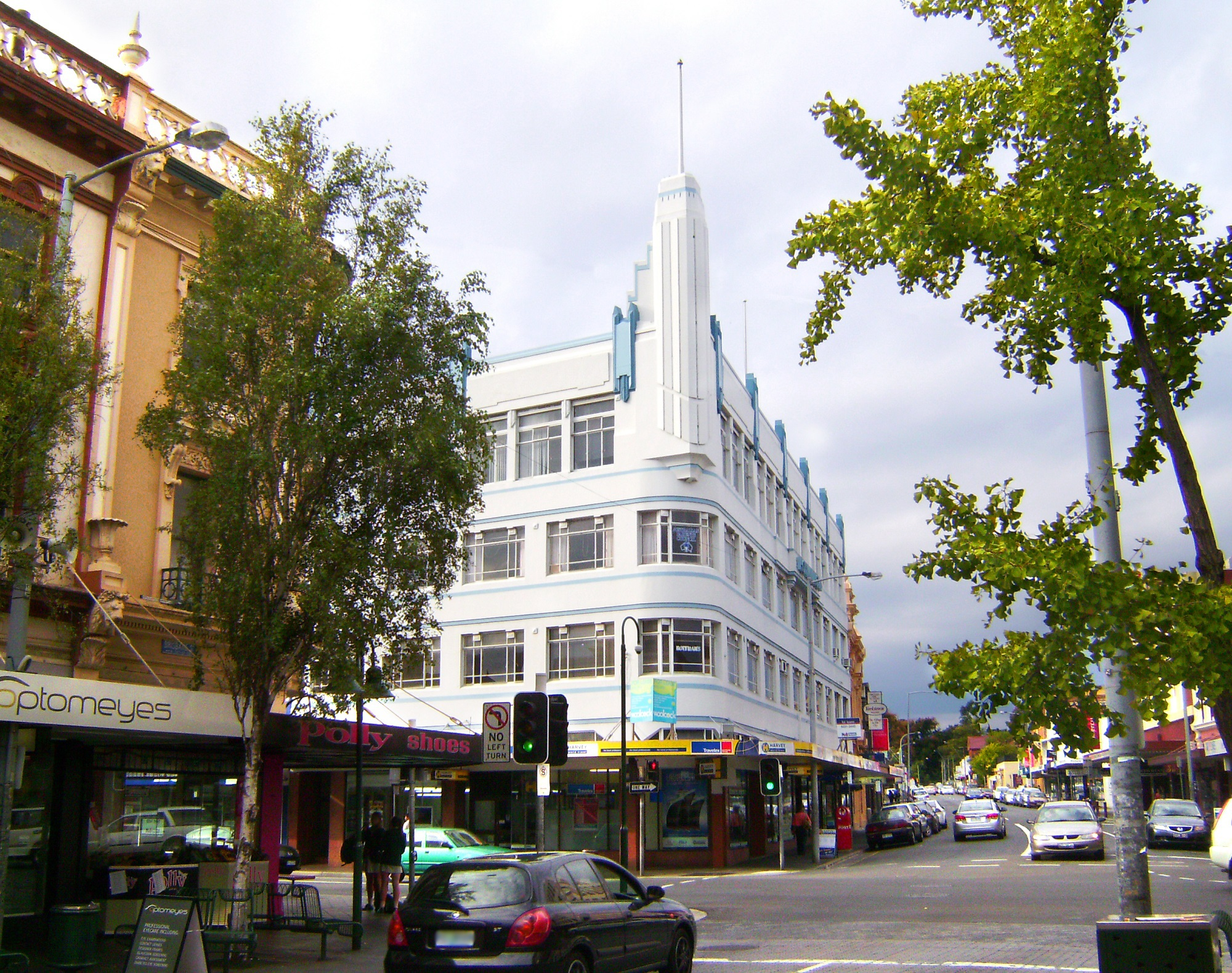
Holyman House, Launceston

- Alfred Harrap Building, corner of Tamar and Cimitier Street, Launceston
- Commonwealth Bank Building, Hobart, Elizabeth Street, Hobart
- Deacons Corner, corner Lytton Street and Invermay Road, Invermay, Launceston
- Duncan House, Launceston
- former Government Printer, 2–4 Salamanca Place, Hobart
- former Hobart Mercury Building, Hobart, 1928
- Holmes Building, corner Brisbane and Charles Street, Launceston
- Holyman House, Launceston, 1936
- Hotel Charles (Old Launceston General Hospital), Launceston
- Hydro-Electric Commission Building, Davey Street, Hobart
- Legacy House, Launceston
- Lucks Corner, corner Patterson and George Street, Launceston
- Medibank House (Launceston Gas Company), St John Street, Launceston
- original Myer Building, Liverpool Street, Hobart (Destroyed in the fire 22 September 2007)
- Park Hotel, Invermay Road, Launceston
- Princess Theatre, Launceston
- Prudential Insurance Building, Elizabeth Street, Hobart
- Rapson Tyre Factory, west end of Gleadow Street, Invermay, Launceston
- Royal Hobart Hospital, Hobart
- Shepherds Bakery, corner Quadrant and St John Street, Launceston
- Star Theatre, Invermay, 1937
- T&G Building, (A & K Henderson), Hobart, 1938
- former Tasmania Savings Bank, Invermay Road, Launceston

=== Victoria ===
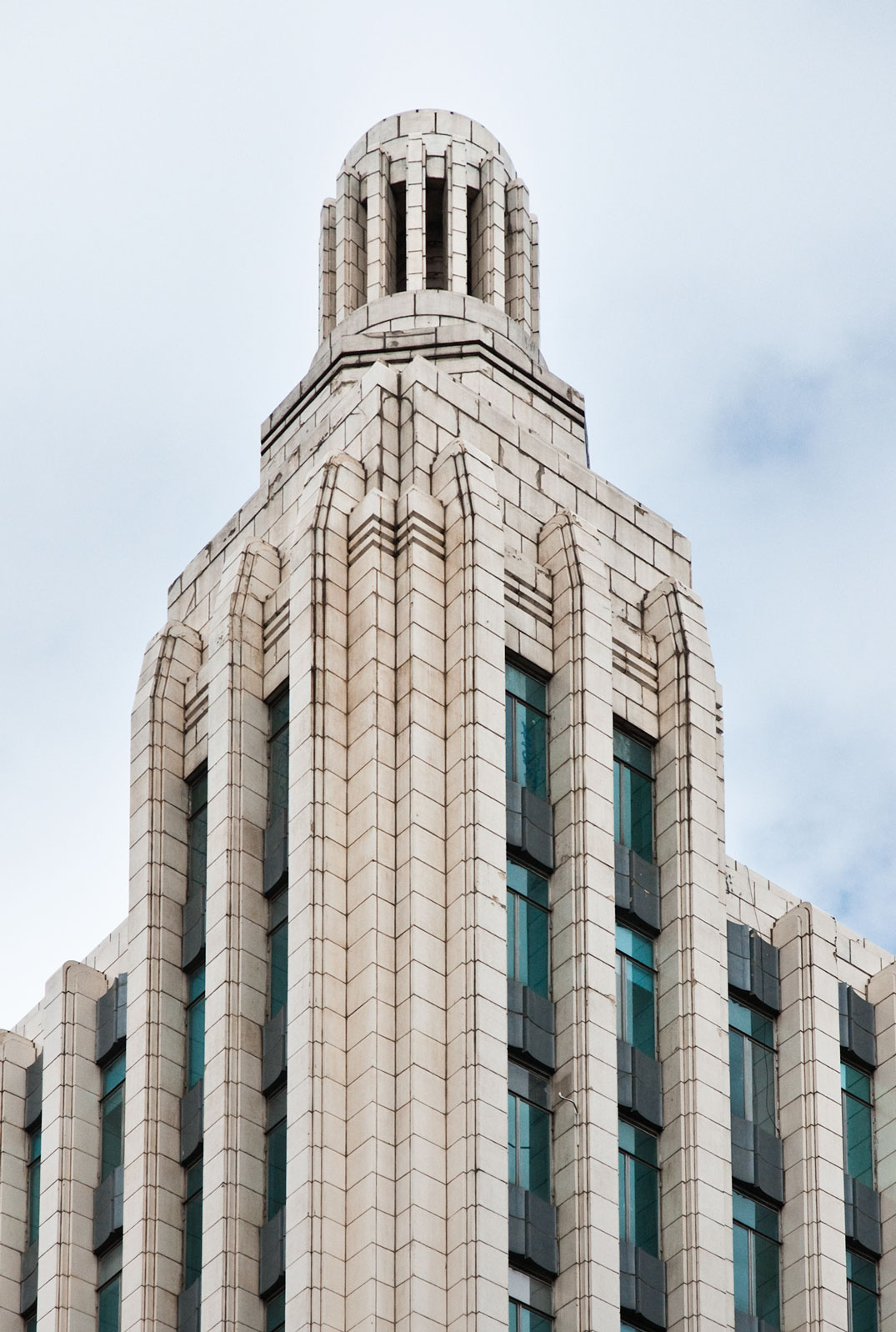
Century Building (Melbourne), 1939

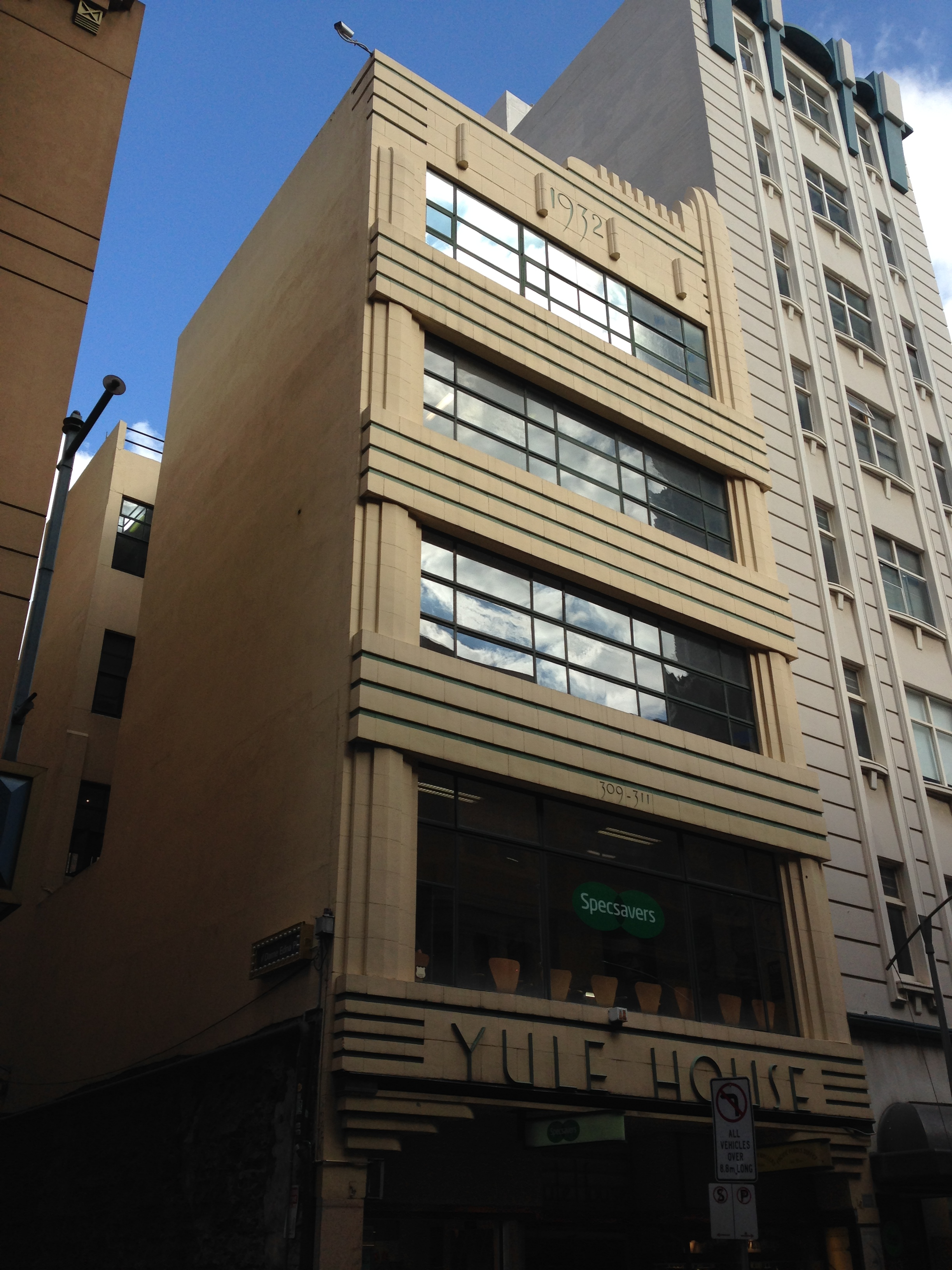
Yule House, Melbourne

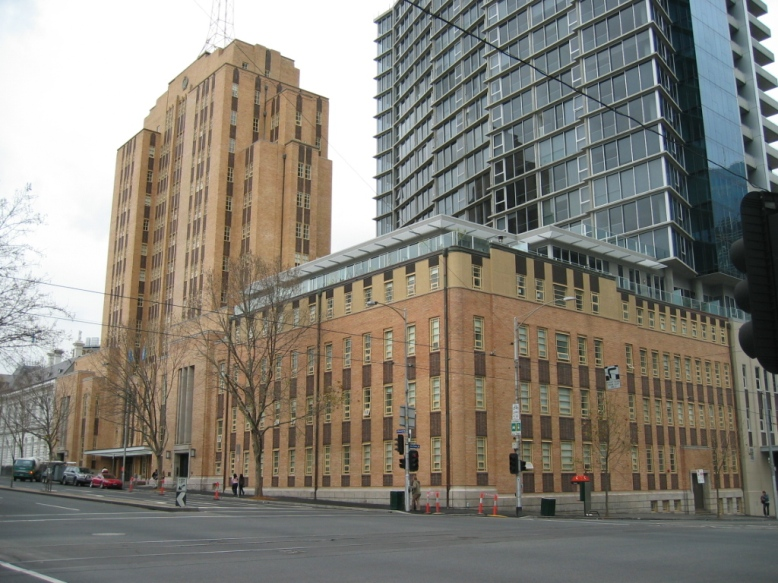
Russell Street Police Headquarters, Melbourne

- 189 (Frank Tate Building), University of Melbourne, 1940
- ANA Building, Melbourne, 1939
- Alkira House, (James Wardrop (architect)), Melbourne, 1936
- Astor Theatre, St Kilda, 1936
- Australasian Catholic Assurance Building, 118–126 Queen Street, Melbourne, 1936
- Australian Natives' Association Building, 28–32 Elizabeth Street, Melbourne
- Beehive Building, (Joseph Plottel), Melbourne, 1935
- Buckley & Nunn, 310 Bourke Street, Melbourne, 1934
- Burnham Beeches (Australia), (Harry Norris), Melbourne, 1933
- Capitol Theatre, Swanston Street, Melbourne, 1924
- Carlow House, 289 Flinders Lane, Melbourne, 1938
- Castlemaine Art Museum, Castlemaine, 1931
- Cathedral Arcade, Melbourne, 1925
- Catholic Ladies College, Eltham
- Centenary Hall, 104–110 Exhibition Street, Melbourne, 1934
- Century Building (Melbourne), (Marcus Barlow), Melbourne, 1939
- Century House, 133 Swanston Street, Melbourne
- Coles Store No 12, 299–307 Bourke Street, Melbourne
- Commercial Union Chambers, 411 Collins Street, Melbourne
- Commonwealth Bank, 225 Bourke Street, MelbourneACA Building, Melbourne, 1936
- Commonwealth House, Melbourne, 1941
- Deva House, (Harry Norris), Melbourne, 1924
- Dovers Building, Melbourne, 1908, 1938
- Epworth Freemasons' Hospital, 166 Clarendon Street, East Melbourne, 1937
- Fish Creek Hotel, Fish Creek
- Glamis Towers, Loch Street, St Kilda
- Greyhound Hotel, St Kilda
- Harry Winbush's house at corner of Fletcher and Nicholson Streets, Essendon 1930s
- Heidelberg Town Hall (the Centre Ivanhoe), Ivanhoe, 1937
- Her Majesty's Theatre (Interior), 199–227 Exhibition Street, Melbourne, 1886
- Holroyd court, St Kilda East, 1936
- Leviathan Building, Melbourne, 1913
- Lissadurn (Australia) Lissadurn, Toorak Road, South Yarra
- Mac.Robertson Girls' High School, 350 Kings Way, Albert Park, 1934
- Manchester Unity Building, (originally the Manchester Unity Independent Order of Oddfellows), 291 Swanston Street, Melbourne, 1932
- McPherson's Building, 546 Collins Street, Melbourne
- Melbourne Athenaeum Theatre, Melbourne, 1924
- Mercy Hospital, 159 Grey Street, East Melbourne, 1934
- Michael Tuck Stand, Glenferrie Oval, 1938
- Mitchell House (Melbourne, Victoria), (Harry Norris), Melbourne, 1937
- Myer Emporium, 314–336 Bourke Street, Melbourne, 1914
- National Theatre, St Kilda, 1928
- Newman College, University of Melbourne, Parkville, Melbourne, 1918
- Newspaper House (Manor Apartment Hotel), 247 Collins Street, Melbourne, 1931
- Palace Westgarth, Melbourne, 1920
- Palais Theatre, St Kilda, 1919, 1927
- Prince of Wales Hotel, St Kilda
- Quest East Melbourne Hotel, Melbourne
- Repatriation Commission Outpatient Clinic, Melbourne, 1937
- Rex Theatre, Charlton, 1938
- Richmond Town Hall, Richmond, 1890s, 1930s
- Rivoli Cinemas, 200 Camberwell Road, Melbourne, 1940
- Royal Hotel, Richmond, 1939
- Russell Street Police Headquarters, (Percy Edgar Everett), Melbourne, 1943
- Shrine of Remembrance, St Kilda Road, Melbourne, 1934
- Sun Theatre, Yarraville, 1938
- T & G Building, Geelong, Geelong, 1934
- Trustees Executors & Agency Company Building, 401 Collins Street, Melbourne
- Yule House, 309–311 Little Collins Street, Melbourne, 1932

=== Western Australia ===
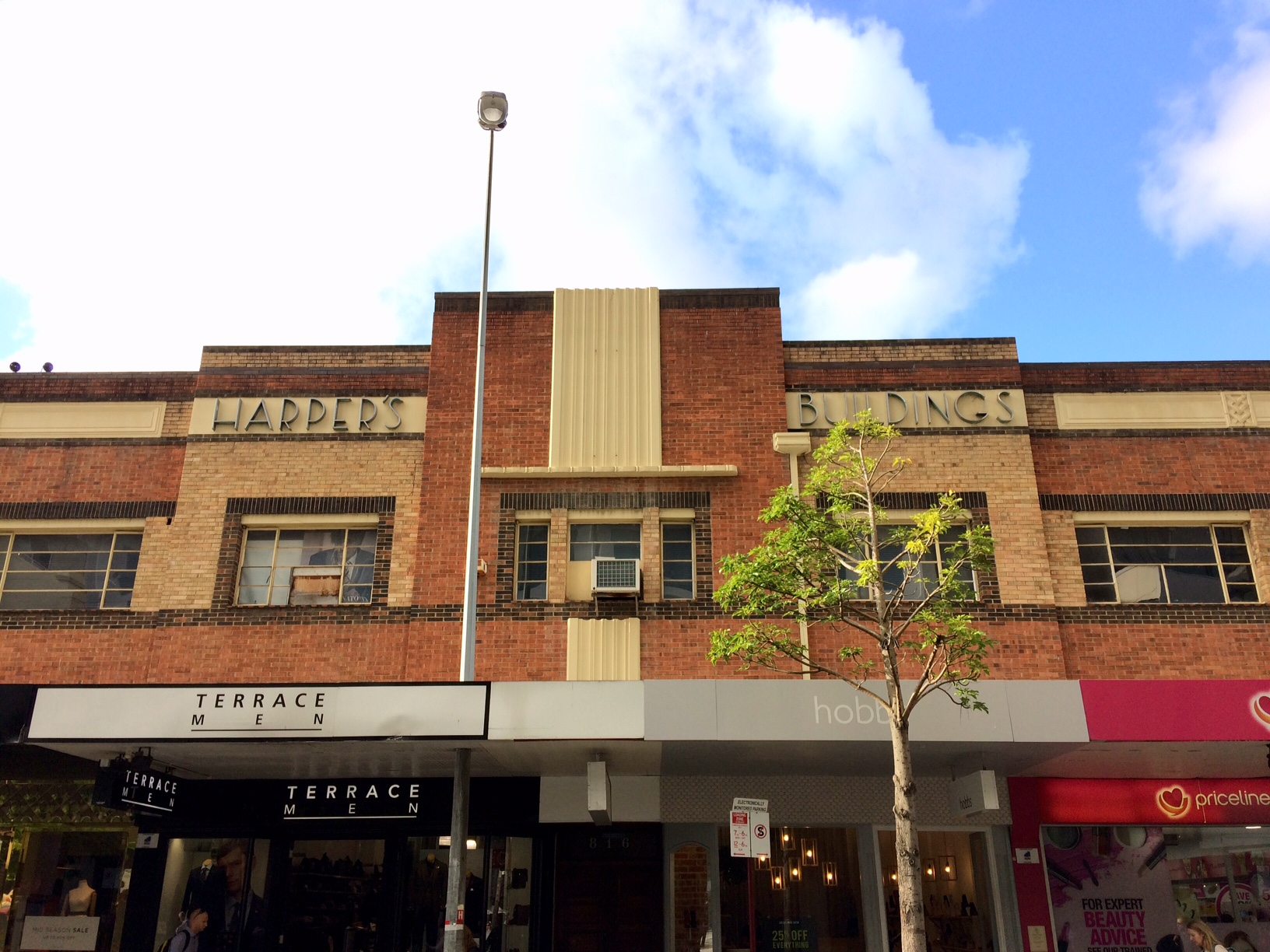
Harper's Buildings, Perth

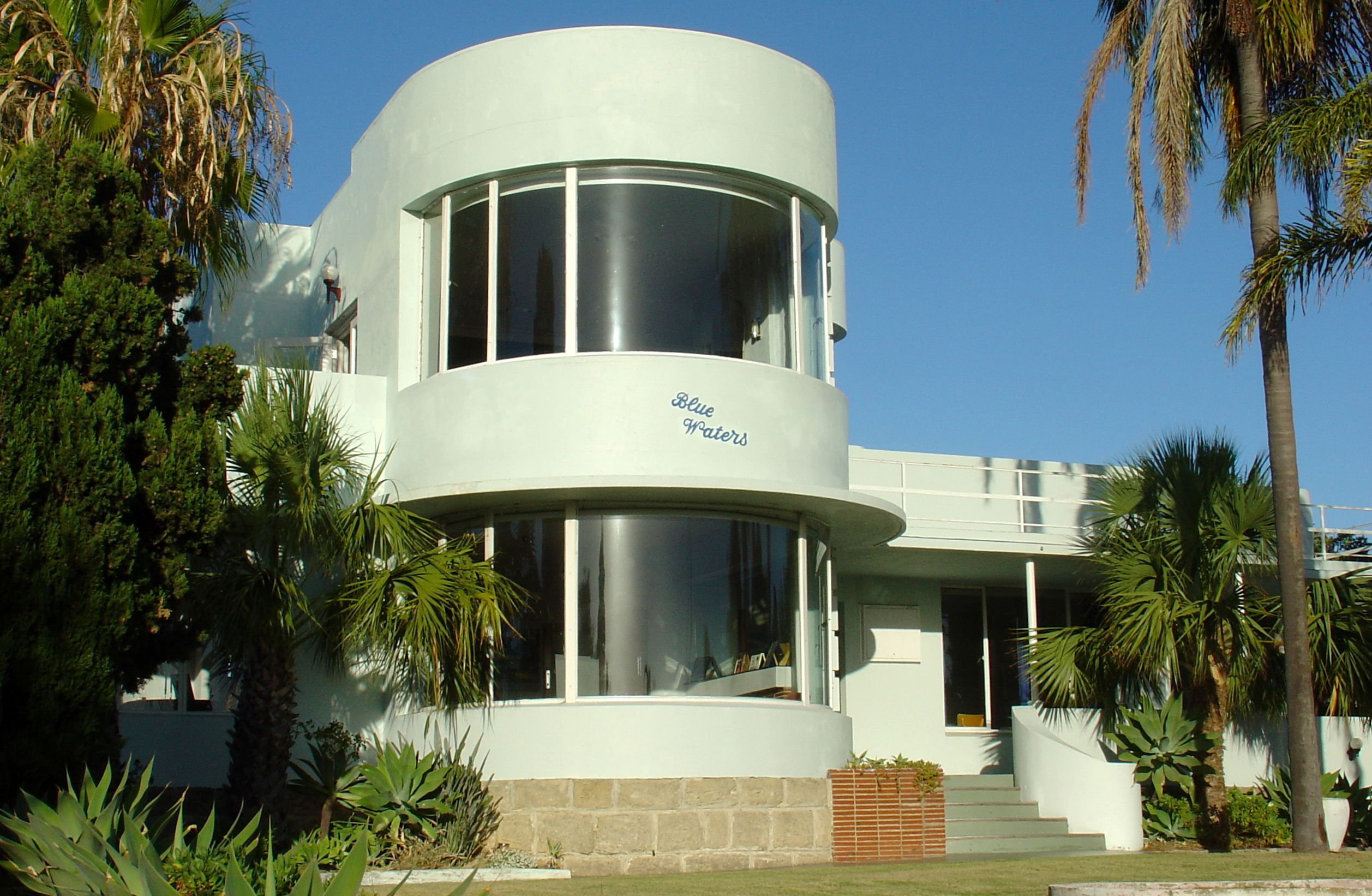
Blue Waters, Como

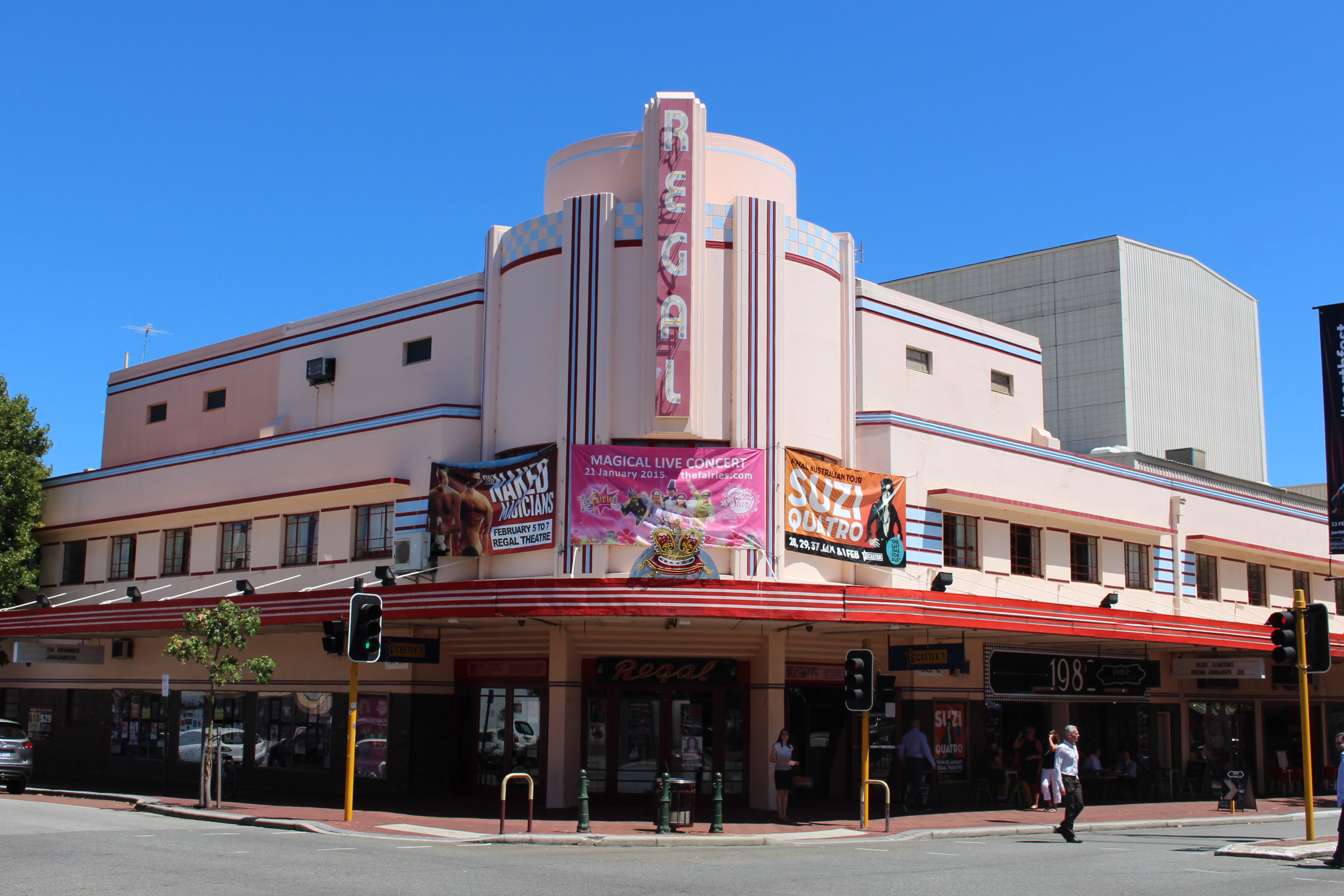
Regal Theatre, Subiaco

- Astor Cinema, Mount Lawley, 1939
- Atlas Building, Perth, 1931
- Attunga Flats, Subiaco, 1937
- Bellevue Mansions, West Perth, late 1920s
- former Blue Room Cabaret, Northbridge, 1930
- Blue Waters, Como, 1954
- Cafe Taimo, Nedlands
- Camelot Cinemas, Mosman Park, 1939
- Carlton Hotel, East Perth, 1928
- Chisholm House, Dalkeith, 1939
- Claremont Council Offices, Claremont, 1935
- Co-Masonic Temple, Vincent, 1936
- Cottesloe Beach Hotel, Cottesloe, 1937
- Criterion Hotel (former Regatta Hotel Complex), Perth, 1937
- Como Theatre, (William T. Leighton), Como, 1939
- Devon House, Perth, 1937
- Edith Dircksey Cowan Memorial, Perth, 1934
- First Church of Christ, Scientist, Perth, 1939
- Gledden Building, (Harold Boas), Perth, 1937
- Guildford Town Hall and Library, Guildford, 1937
- Harper's Buildings, Perth, 1937
- Immaculate Conception Catholic Parish, Fremantle, 1940
- Karrakatta Cemetery Columbarium, Karrakatta
- King Edward Memorial Hospital entrance, Subiaco, 1938
- Kylemore apartments, Dalkeith, 1937
- Lawson Apartments, (Reginald Summerhayes), Perth, 1937
- Lincoln Street Ventilation Stack, Highgate, 1935
- Lord Forrest Olympic Pool, Kalgoorlie, 1938
- Luna Leederville (formerly New Oxford Theatre), Leederville, 1927
- Mayfair Flats, West Perth, 1936
- Michelides Tobacco Factory, (Demolished 2014), Perth, 1922
- Motor House, Perth, 1937
- Mount Lawley Bowls Club, Mount Lawley, 1936
- Nedlands Park Masonic Hall, Crawley, 1935
- Nedlands Tennis Club, Nedlands, 1937
- P&O Building, Perth, 1930
- Perth City YHA (former St. John's Ambulance Building), Perth, 1939
- Piccadilly Theatre and Arcade, (William T. Leighton), Perth, 1938
- Plaza Theatre, (William G. Bennett), Perth, 1937
- Raffles Hotel, (William G. Bennett), Perth, 1936
- Regal Theatre, Subiaco, 1938
- Sawyers Valley Tavern, Sawyers Valley, 1937
- Sir J.J. Talbot Hobbs Memorial, Perth, 1940
- South Fremantle Power Station, North Coogee, 1946
- St. Mary's Hall, South Perth, 1936
- Tivoli Hall (formerly Applecross District Hall), Applecross
- Walsh's Building, Perth, 1923
- Wembley Lifecare Physiotherapy (formerly Wembley Theatre and Gardens), Wembley, 1937
- West Australian Ballet Company Centre (former Royal West Australian Institute and Industrial School for the Blind), Marylands, 1937
- Windsor Cinema, Nedlands, 1937

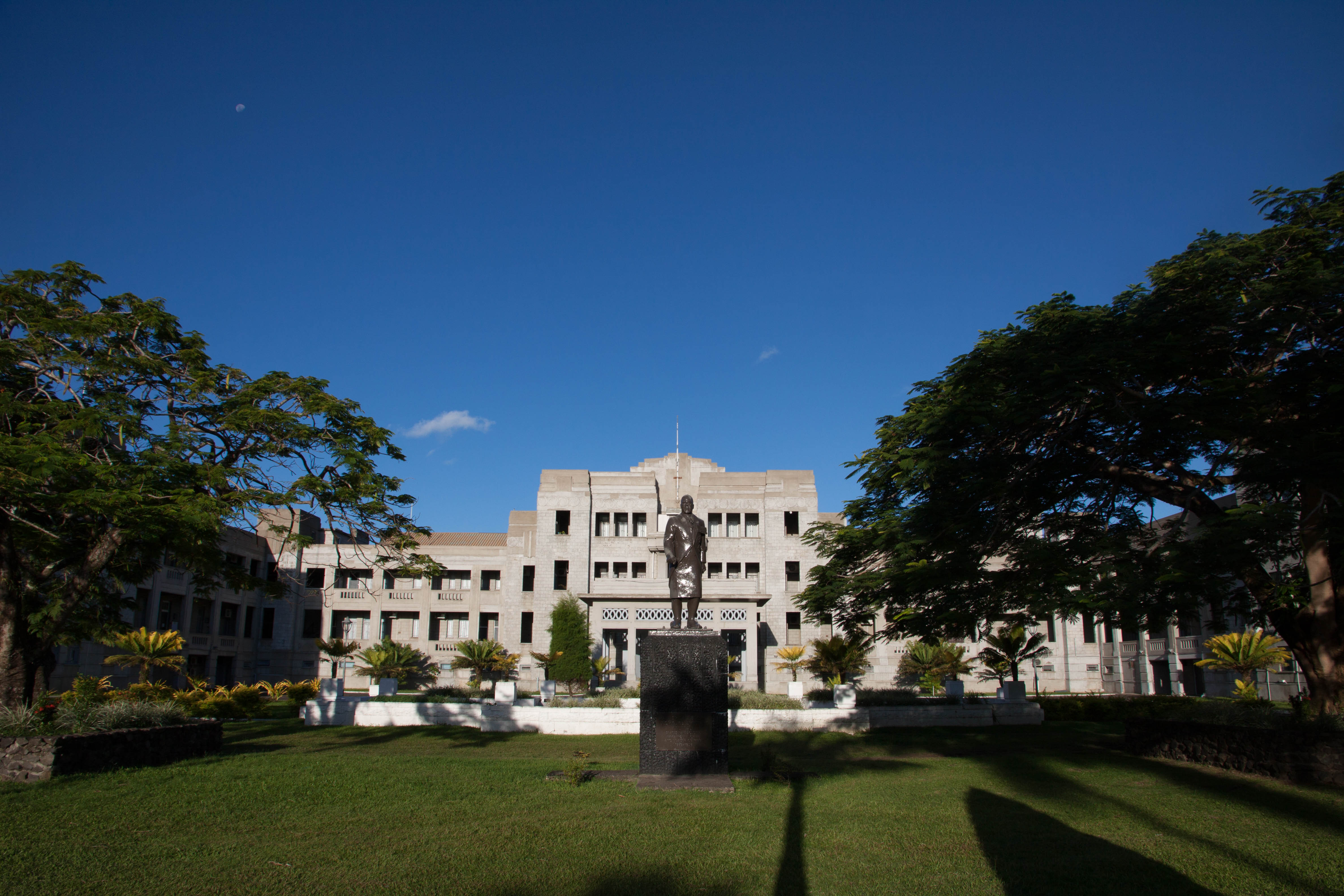
Government Buildings, Suva, Fiji

== Fiji ==
- Government Buildings, Suva, Suva, Late 1930s
- Regal Cinema, Suva, Late 1920s
- LDS Temple Suva, Suva

== New Zealand ==
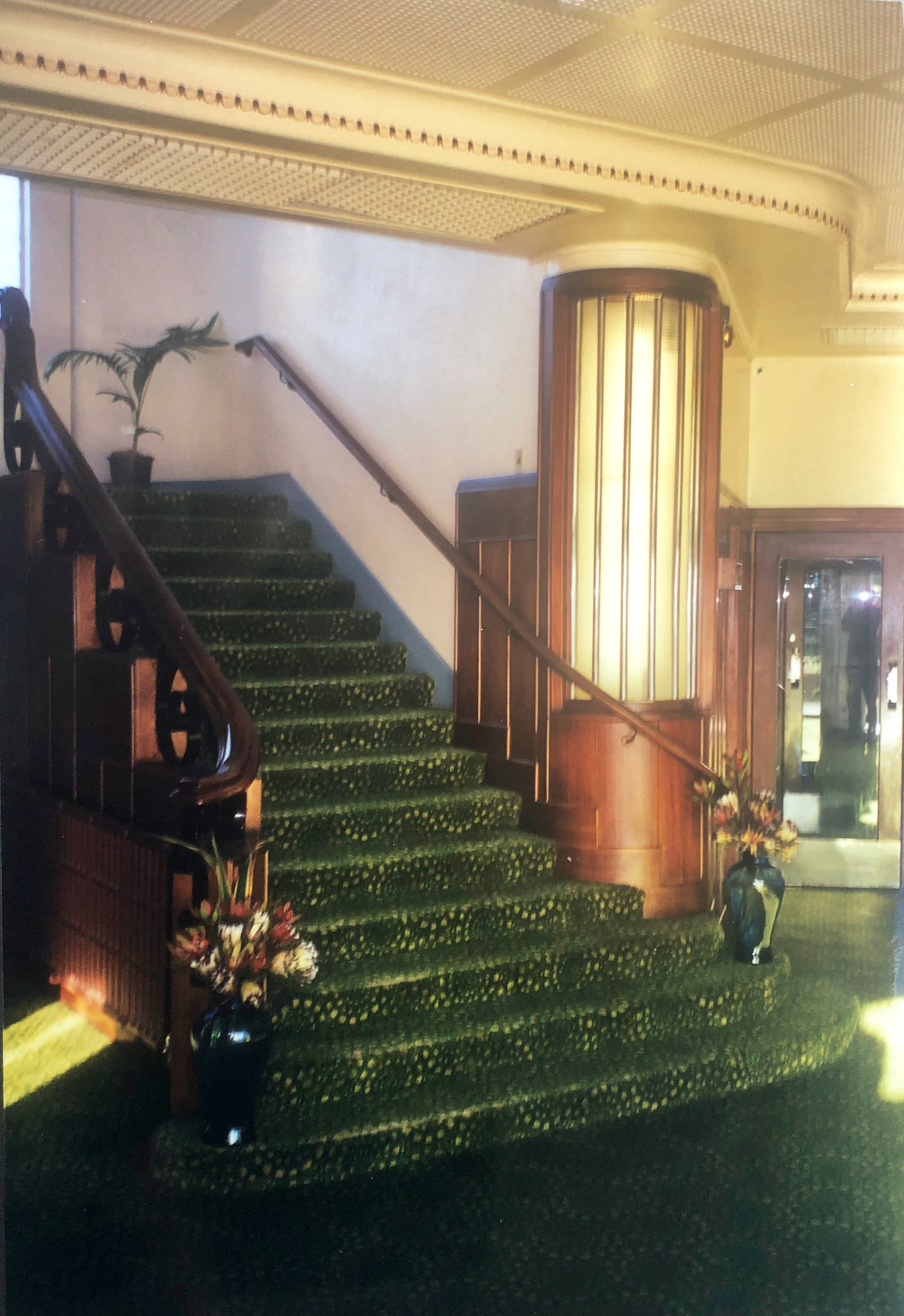
Art Deco hall & stairs Putaruru Hotel

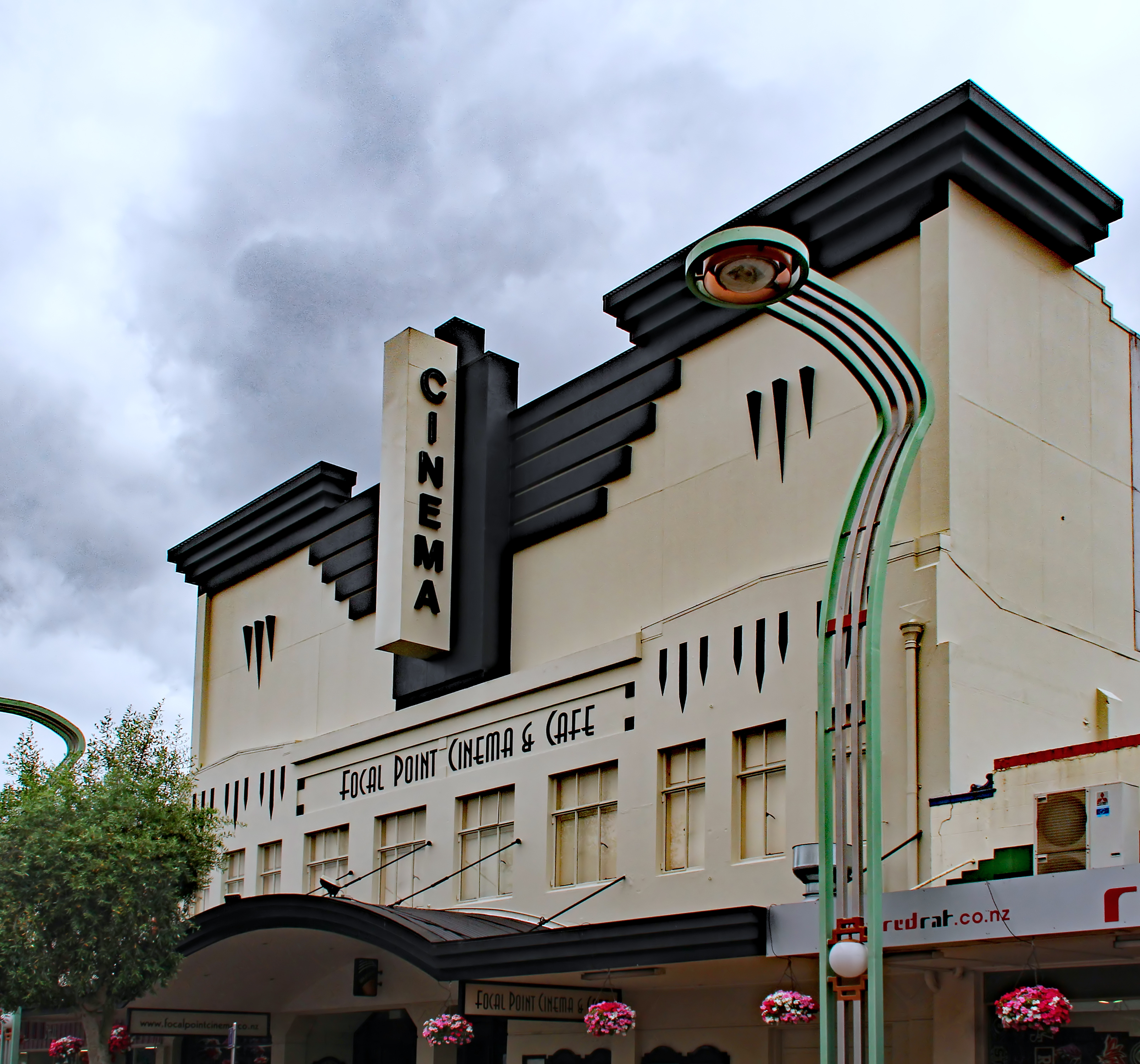
Focal Point Cinema, Hastings, New Zealand

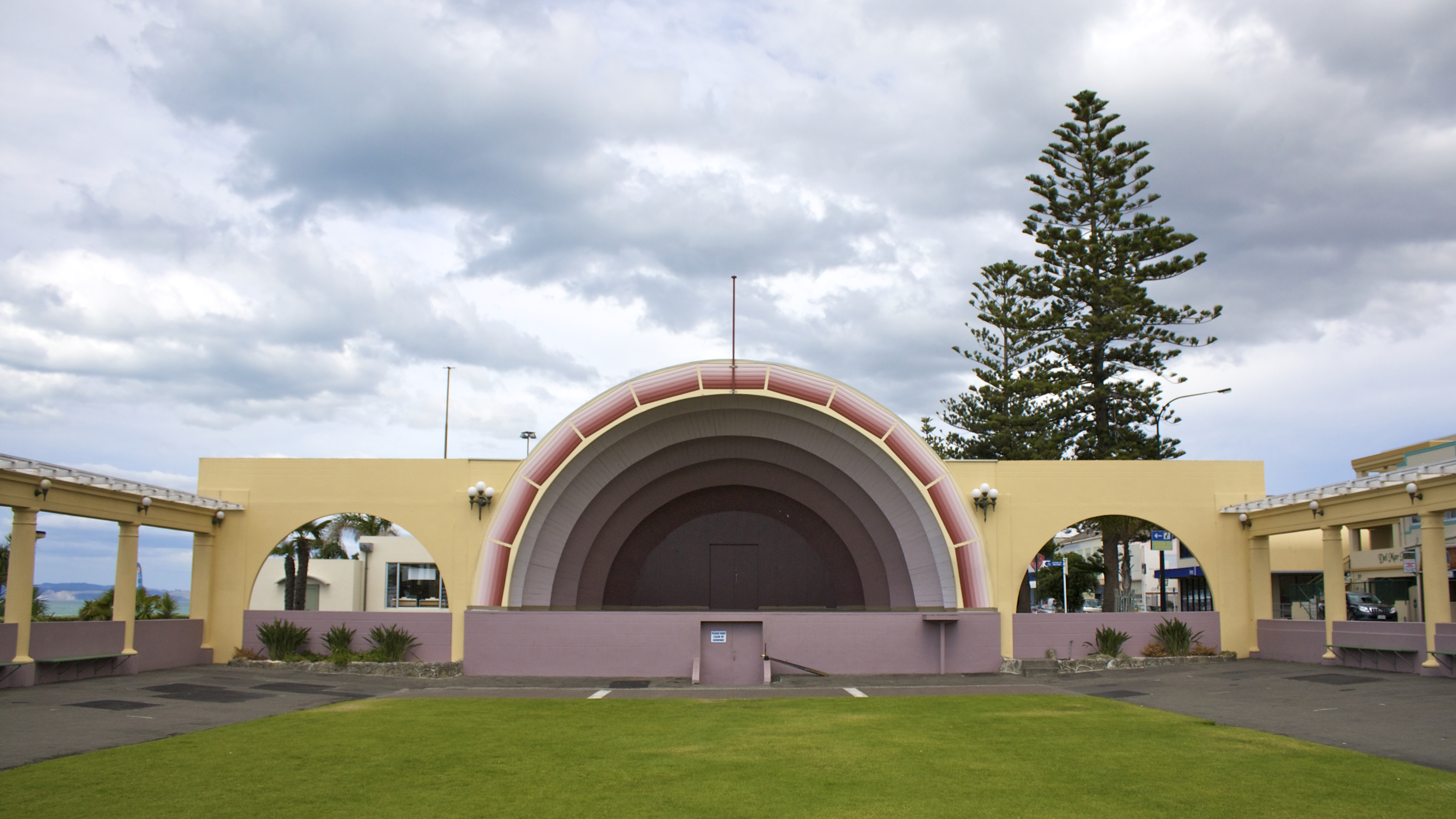
The Soundshell, Napier, New Zealand

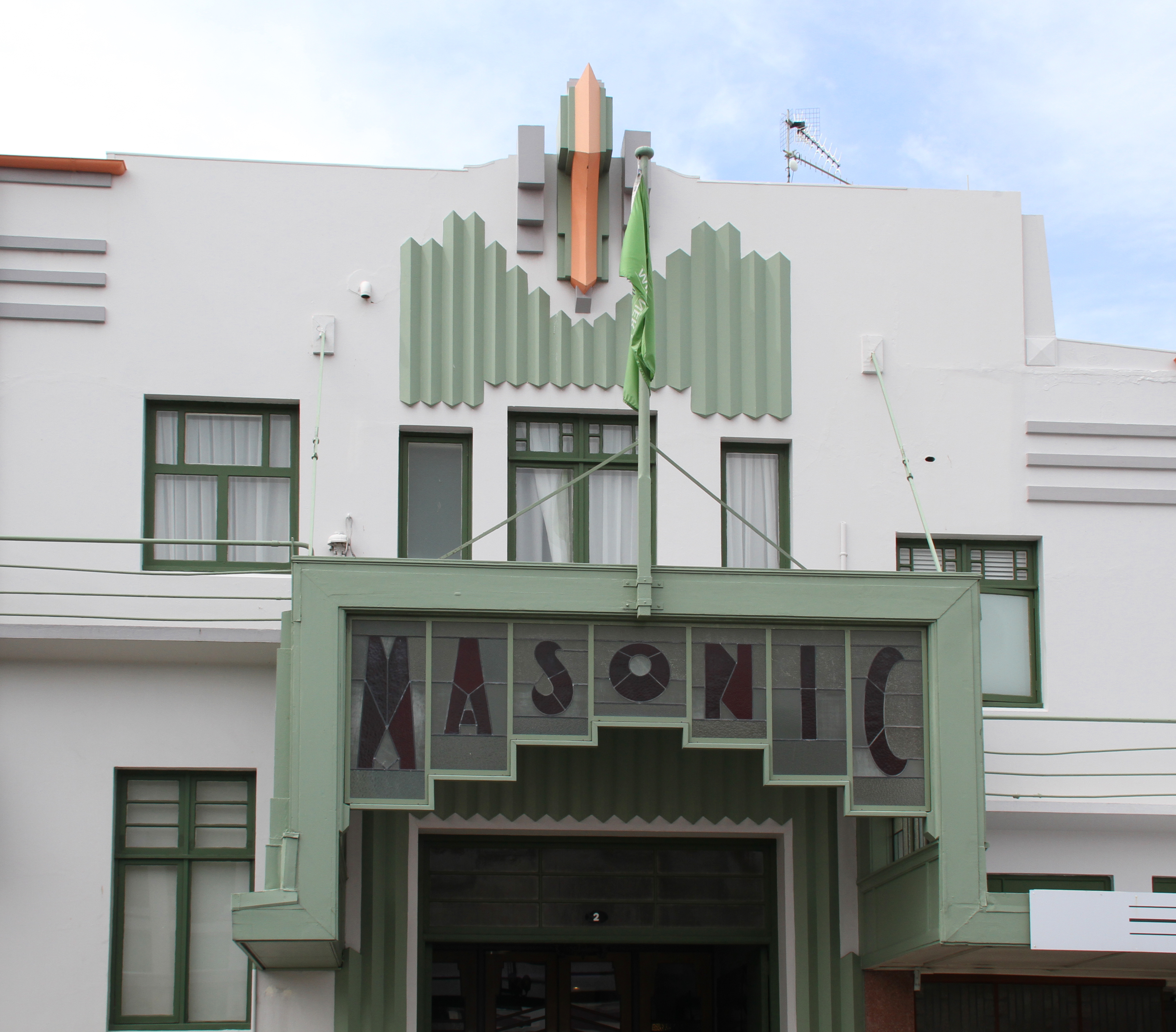
Masonic Hotel, Napier

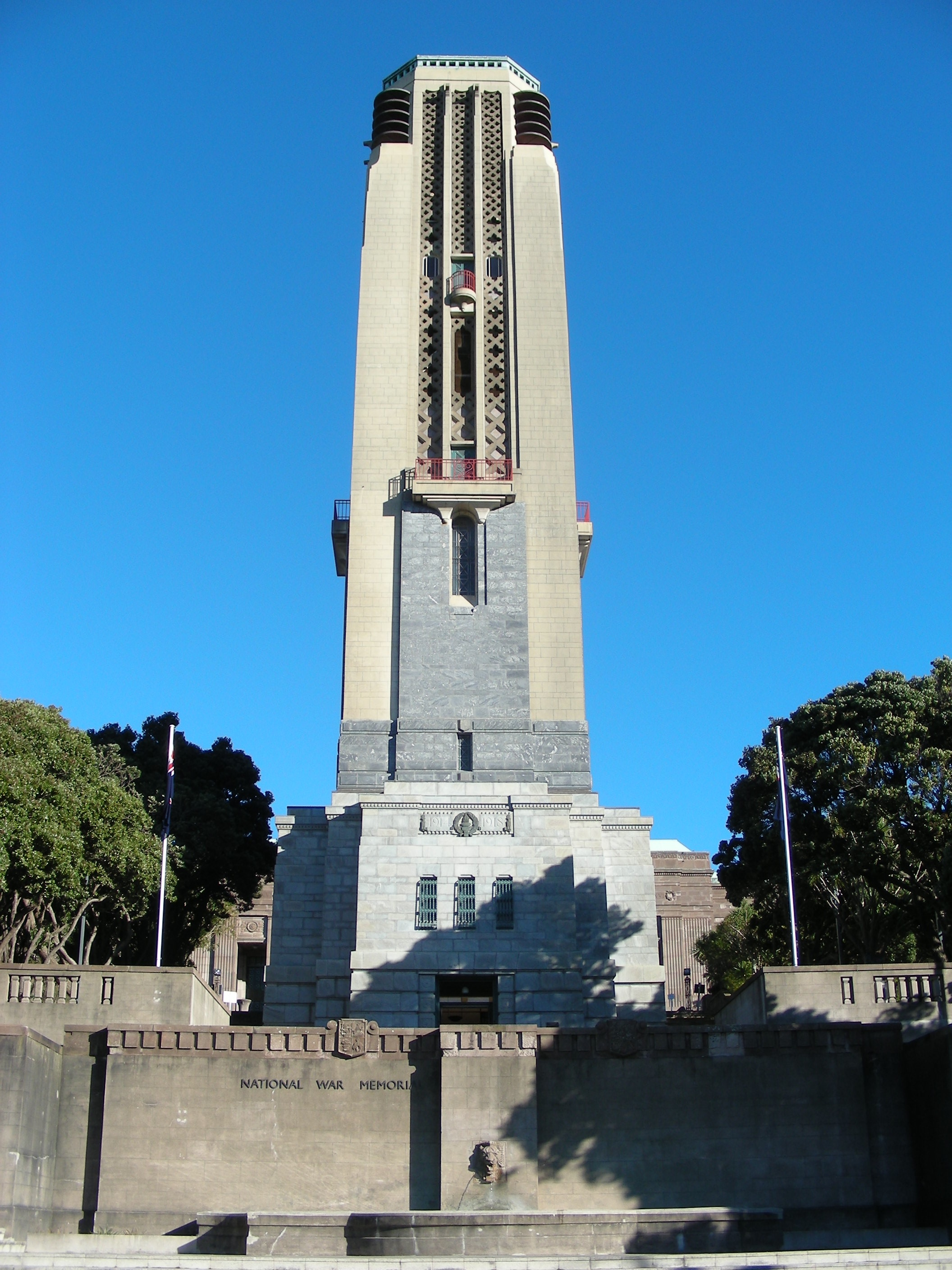
New Zealand National War Memorial, Wellington

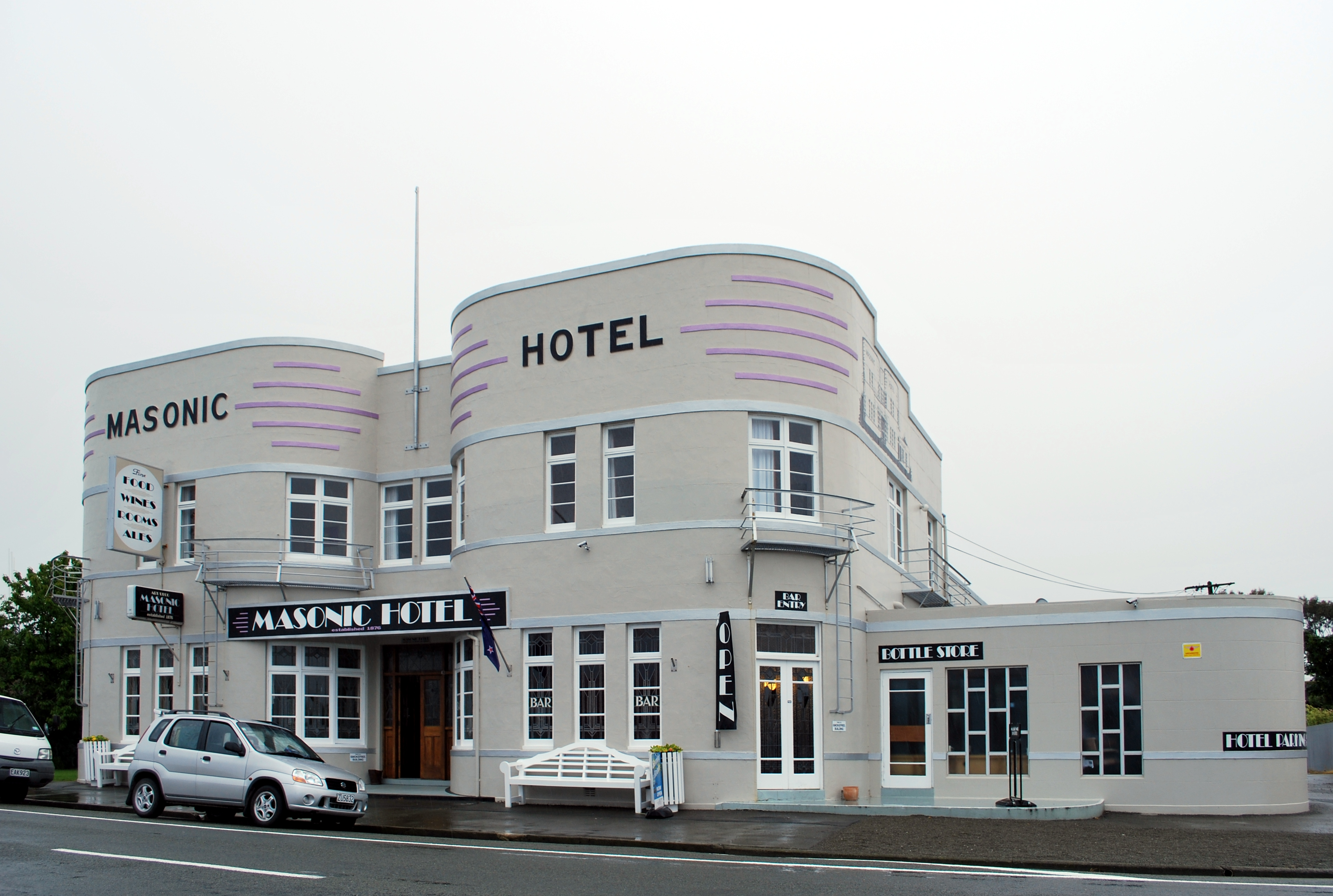
Masonic Hotel, St. Andrews, New Zealand

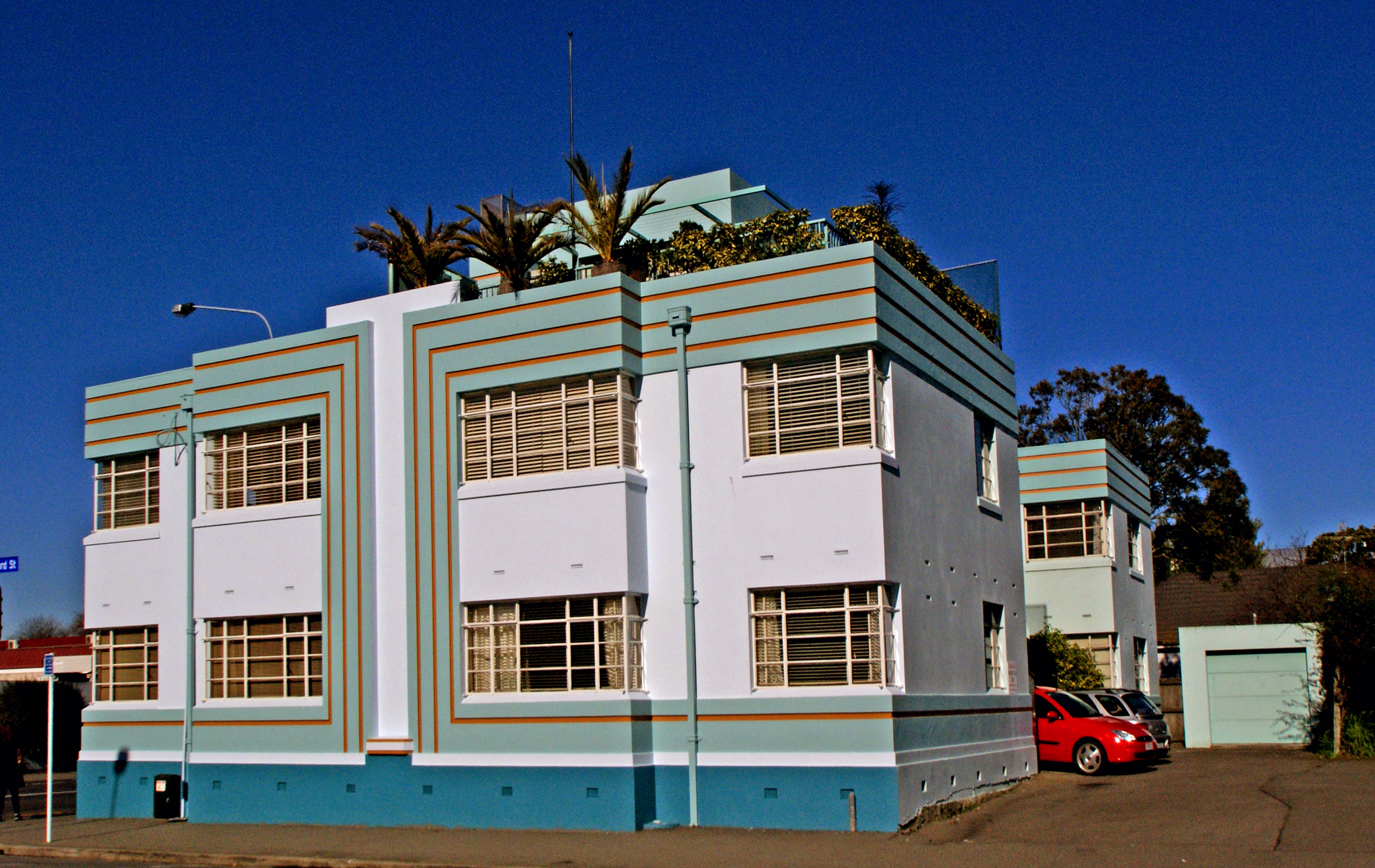
West Avon Flats, Montreal St, Christchurch, New Zealand

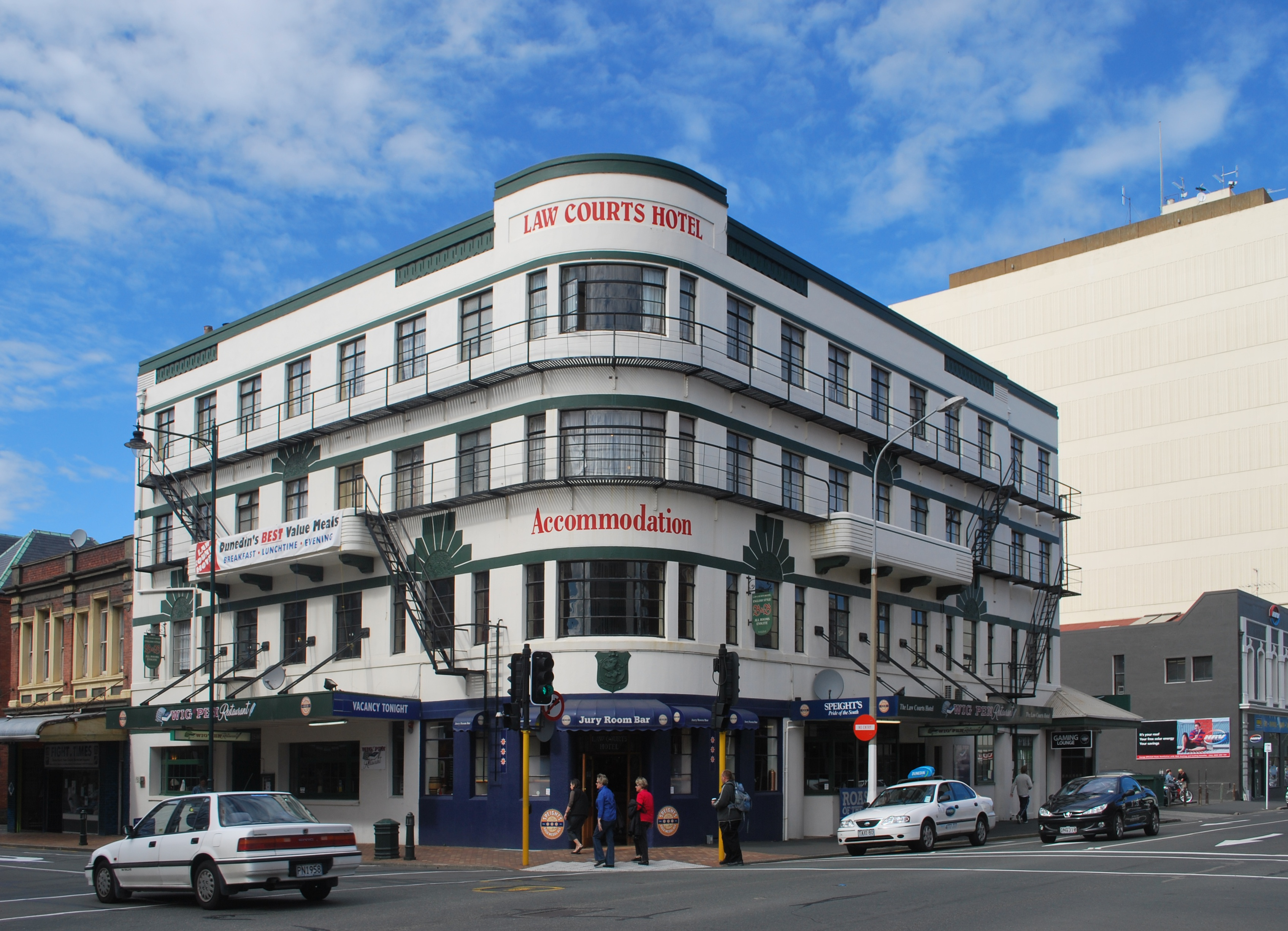
Law Courts Hotel, Dunedin, New Zealand

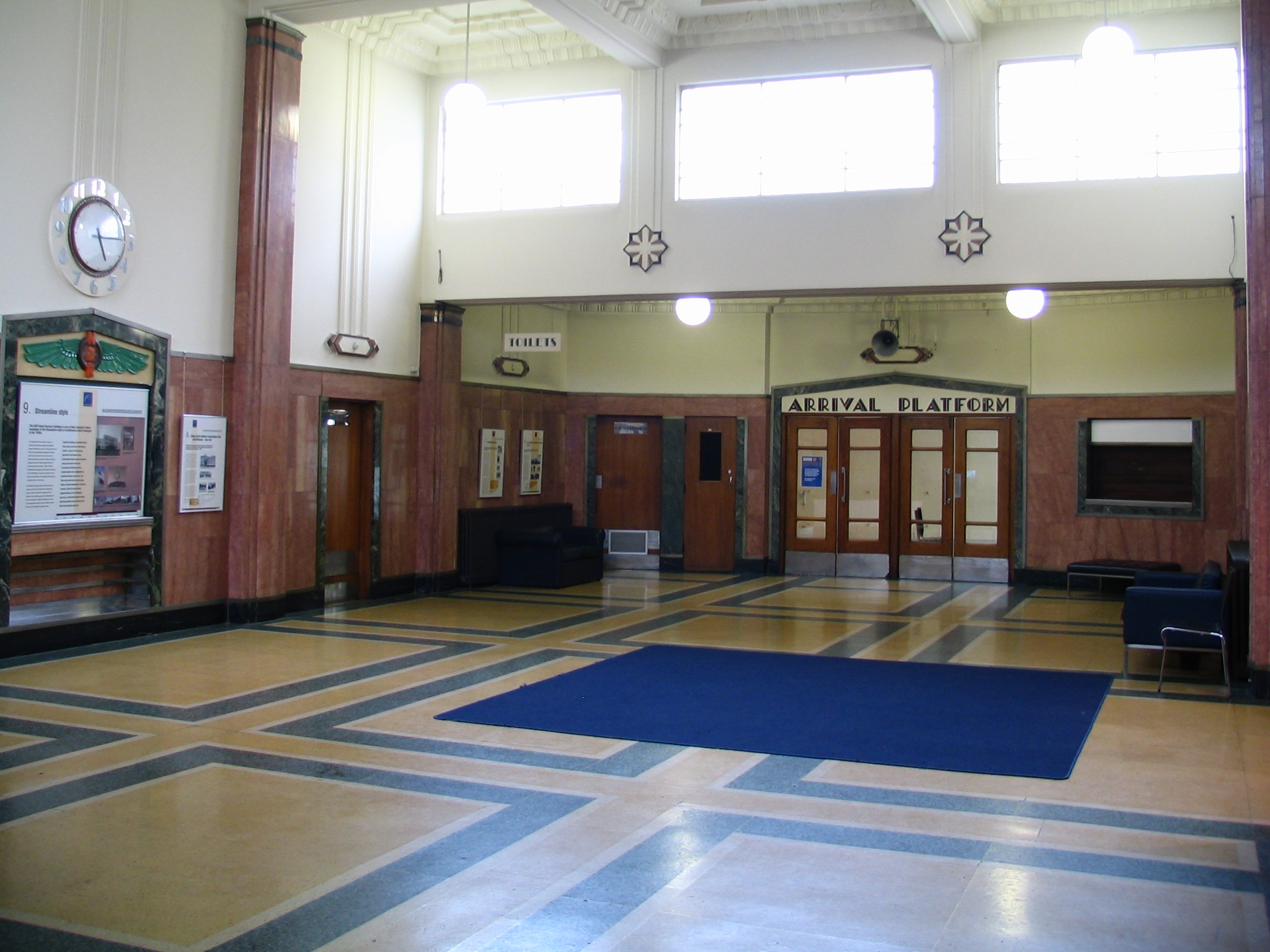
Preserved bus station foyer, Toitū Otago Settlers Museum, Dunedin

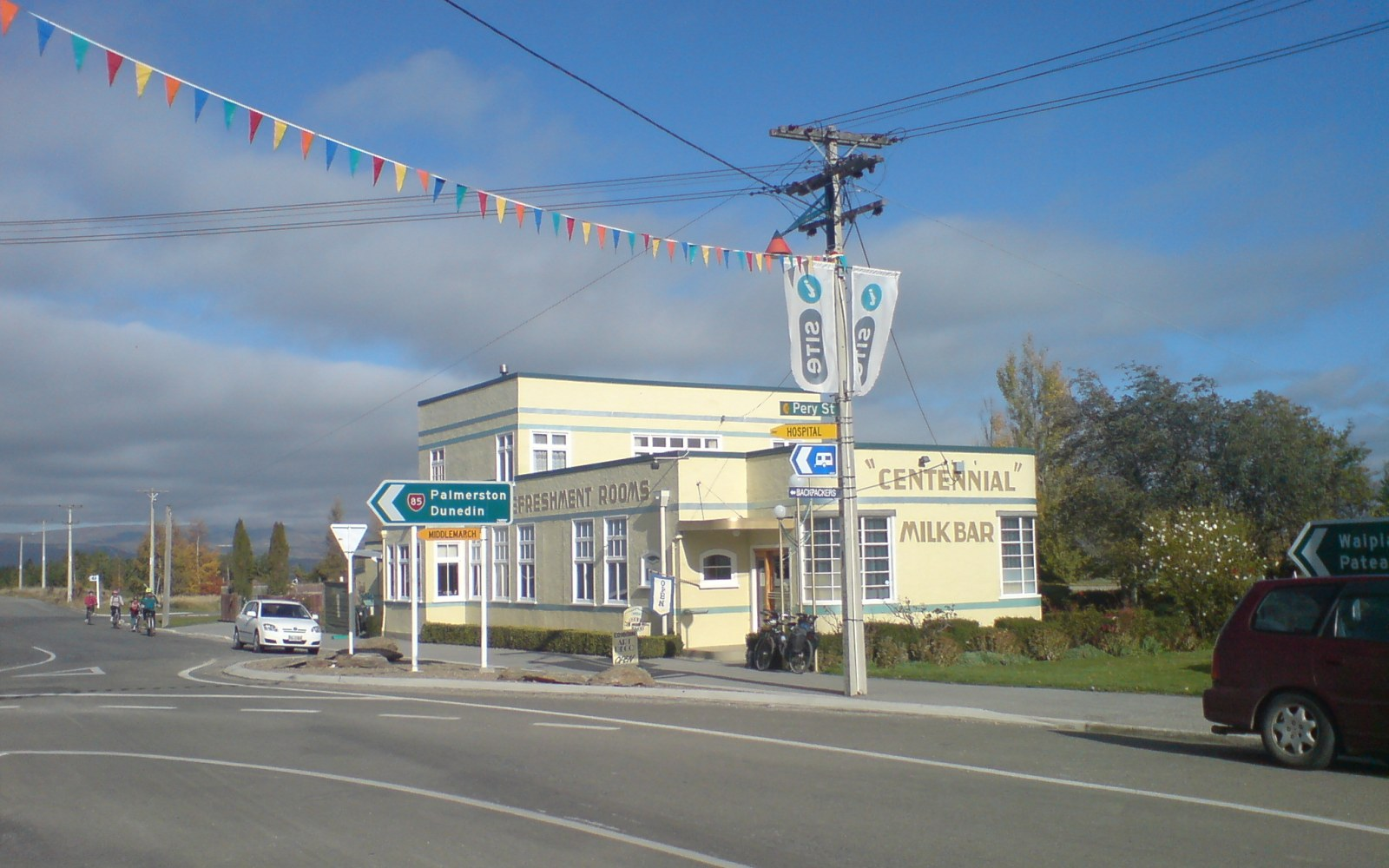
Centennial Milk Bar - Rural Art Deco Gallery, Ranfurly, New Zealand

=== Auckland ===
- ASB Auckland Savings Bank building, Ponsonby, Auckland
- Capitol Cinema, Balmoral, 1922
- Landmark House, Auckland, 1929
- Metropolis building, (Peddle Thorp), Auckland, 1999
- Scenic Circle Airedale Hotel, Auckland, 1940
- St. Peter's College, (Gummer and Ford), Auckland, 1939

=== Bay of Plenty ===
- Commercial Hotel, Waihi

=== Waikato ===
==== Hamilton ====
- 82 Grey Street, Hamilton East, 1932
- 98 McFarlane Street, Hamilton East, 1939
- Casino (Lenscrete dome of former post office), 1940
- Fairfield Bridge, 1937
- Frankton Hotel 1929

==== Huntly ====
- Essex Arms (former Coal Mine Hotel), Huntly, 1930

==== Putāruru ====
- Putaruru Hotel, Putāruru, 1952

==== Raglan ====
- Raglan Town hall (municipal buildings), Raglan, 1928

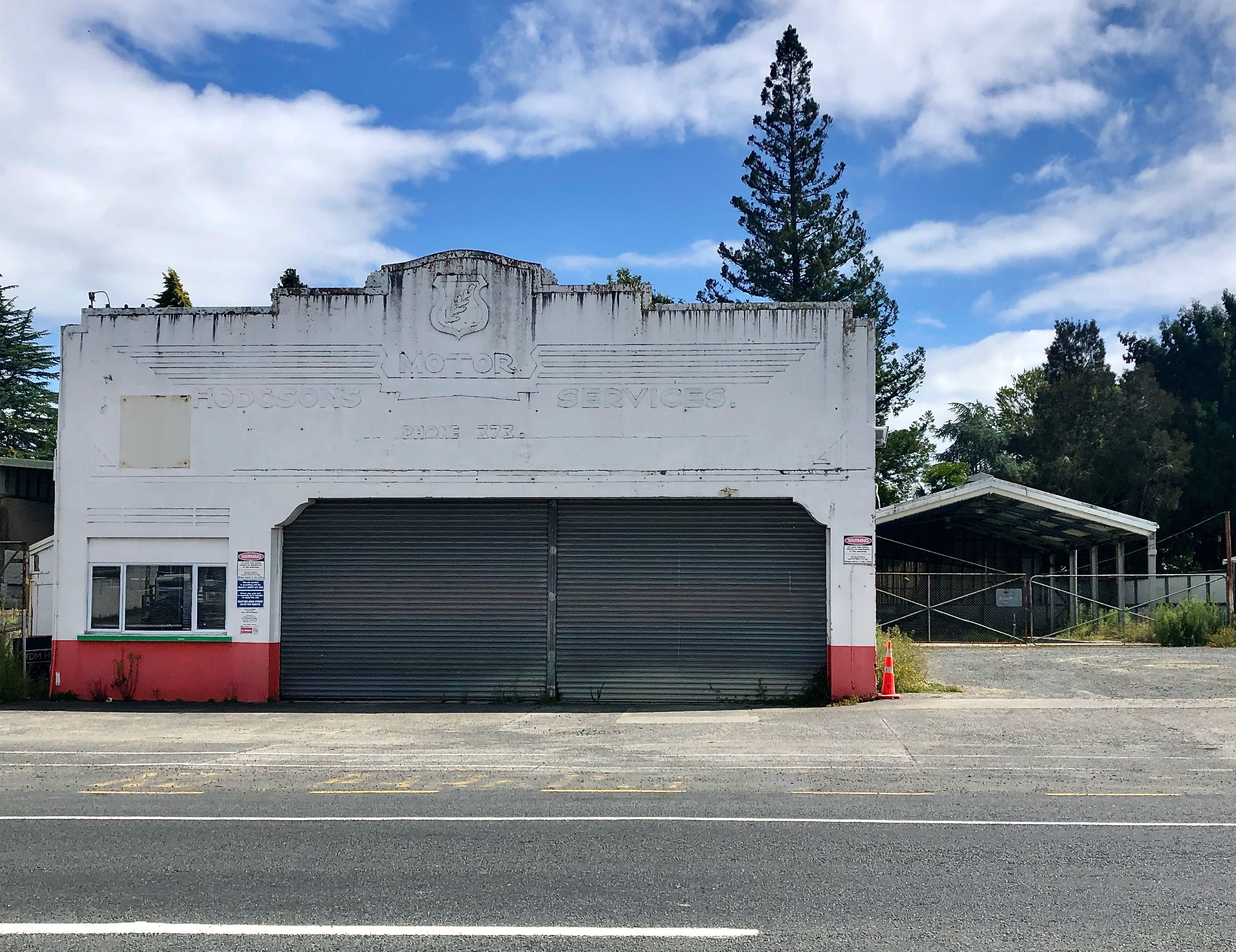
Hodgson's Motors garage, Te Awamutu

==== Te Awamutu ====
- Bus garage 1936

=== Hawke's Bay ===
==== Hastings ====
- Bank of New South Wales, Market Street, Hastings, 1933
- Carlsson House, Hastings, 1933
- CML Building, Hastings
- Cornwall Park Stone Bridges, Hastings, 1930s
- Focal Point Cinema Hastings, Hastings
- Hastings Clock Tower, Hastings, 1934
- Hastings Health Center, Hastings, 1931
- Hawke's Bay Electric Power Board Company, Hastings, 1937
- Holdens Building, Hastings, 1934
- Las Palmas, Hastings, 1935
- Westermans Building, Hastings, 1932

==== Napier ====
- 24A Hastings Street, Napier, 1933
- Abbotts Building, Napier, 1932
- The AMP Building, Napier, 1935
- Art Deco Centre (formerly the Central Fire Station), Napier, 1926, 1931
- Art Deco Masonic Hotel (W J Prowse), Napier, 1932
- Art Deco Trust (formerly the New Zealand Insurance building, Napier
- The ASB Bank, Napier
- Bowman Building, Napier, 1933
- Central Hotel, Napier, 1931
- Charlies Art Deco Restaurant, Napier, mid-1930s
- Civic Centre, Napier, 1925
- Criterion Hotel, Napier, 1932
- The ''Daily Telegraph'' Building, Napier, 1932
- Deco City Motor Lodge, Napier
- Earthquake Memorial, Park Island, Napier, 1932
- Halsbury Chambers, Napier, 1932
- Harstons Building Pub, Napier, 1930
- Hawke's Bay Chambers, Napier, 1931
- Hildebrandt's menswear building, Napier, 1932
- Kidsons Building, Napier, 1932
- Masonic Hotel, Napier, 1931
- McLean Park Pumping Station, Napier, 1931
- Ministry of Works Building, Napier
- Morris Street Pumping Station, Napier, 1931
- MTG Hawke's Bay (formerly the Hawke's Bay Museum), Napier, 1936–37
- Municipal Theatre, Napier, 1938
- Munster Chambers, Napier, 1933
- Napier Antiques & Jewellery Centre (formerly the Ministry of Transport Building), Napier
- Napier Heritage Trust (former Napier Fire Brigade hall,) Napier
- The Napier Soundshell, Napier, 1935
- The National Tobacco Company Building, Ahuriri, 1933
- The New Napier Arch, Napier, 1930s
- The Norwich Union, Napier, 1932
- Parker's Chambers, Napier, 1932
- Provincial Hotel, Napier
- Public Trust Building, Napier, 1932
- Richardsons Building, Ahuriri, 1932
- The Rose Irish Pub, Napier, 1932
- Scinde Building, Napier, 1932
- Self-Help Shoppers Fair building, Napier, 1933
- The Smith and Chambers Building, Napier, 1932
- T&G Building, Napier, 1935
- The Taradale Hotel (Now McDonald's), Napier, 1931
- Tennyson Chambers, Napier, 1932
- Thorp's Building, Napier, 1932
- Waiapu Cathedral of Saint John the Evangelist, Napier, Napier, 1931

=== Manawatū-Whanganui ===
- Embassy 3 Cinema, Whanganui, Mid 1920s

=== Palmerston North ===
- Ansett Tower (Former T & G Building), 16-22 Broadway Avenue 1938
- Regent Theatre, 53 Broadway Avenue 1930
- Broadway Chambers & Coronation Building, 88-92 Broadway Avenue 1936
- United Manawatu Lodge (now Aqaba), 186 Broadway Avenue 1931
- Palmerston North Police Station (Former), 351-361 Church Street 1939
- Ward Brothers Building, 213 Cuba Street 1935
- Coronation Hall, 801 Main Street 1911
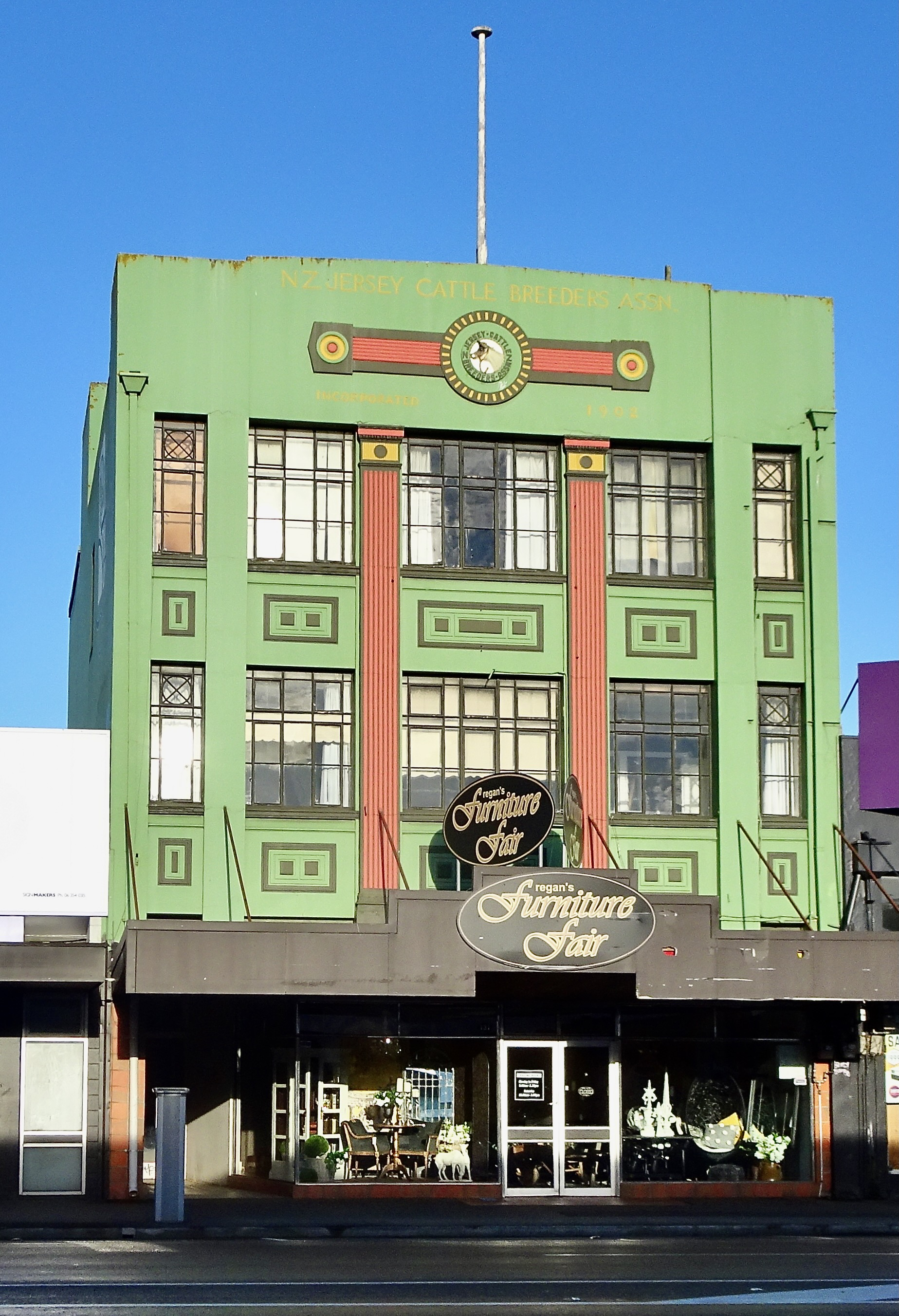
- 129-131 Rangitikei Street, Palmerston North 1928
  NZ Jersey Cattle Breeders Assn, 129-131 Rangitikei Street 1928
- Te Awe Awe Flats, 72 Te Awe Awe Street 1950
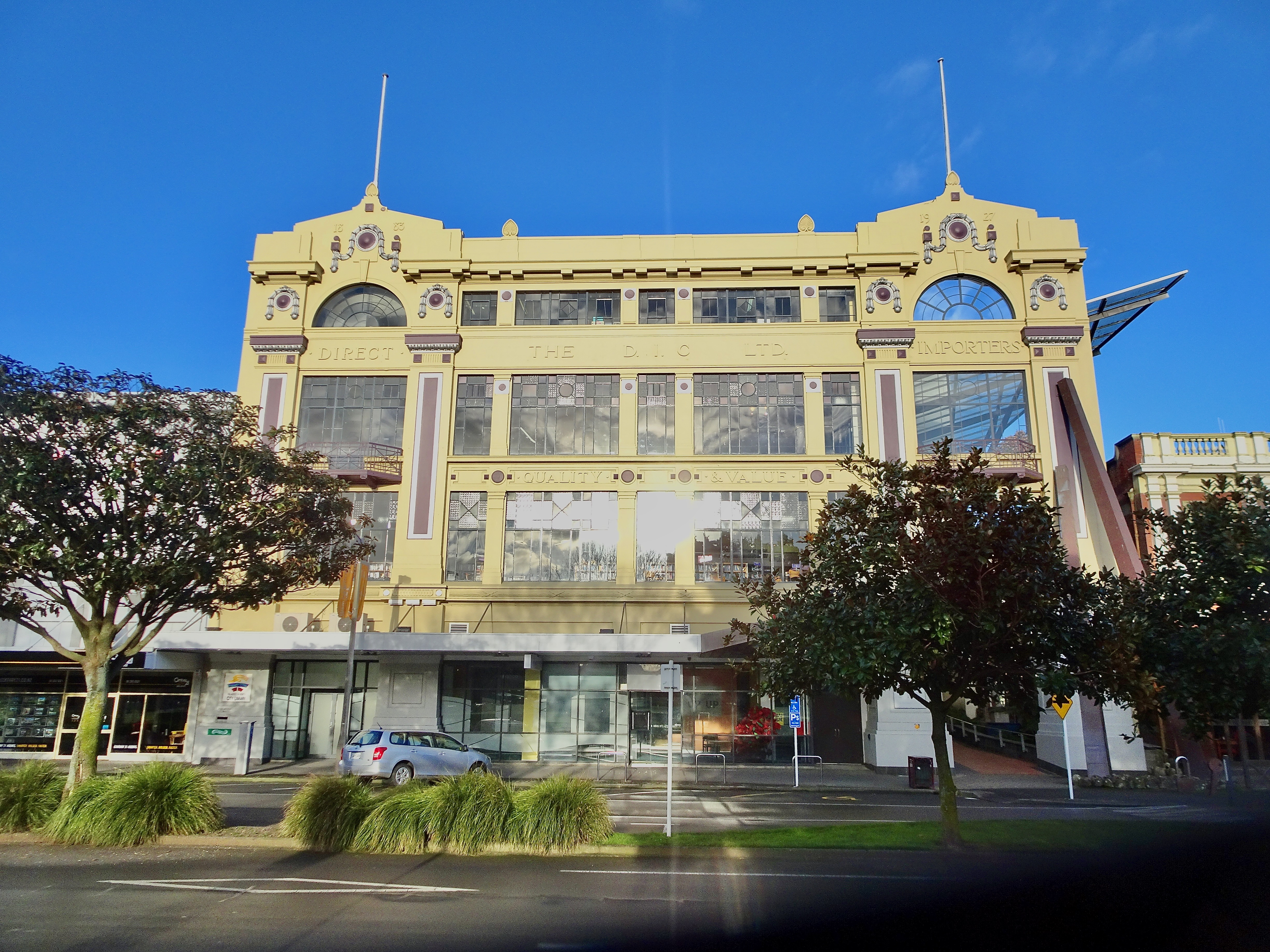
- 1928 Palmerston North City Library
  Palmerston North City Library (former Dunedin Import Co store), 4-9 The Square 1928
- Strand Building, 31-35 The Square 1930
- Old Council Chambers, 47 The Square 1892, renovated 1945
- Ladies Rest Rooms, The Square 1936
- Arts faculties, Massey University 1931

=== Wellington ===
- AMP Building (Edmund Clere), Wellington, 1929
- Berhampore State Flats, Berhampore, Wellington, 1939
- Hotel St George, Wellington, 1930
- Hotel Waterloo, 1937
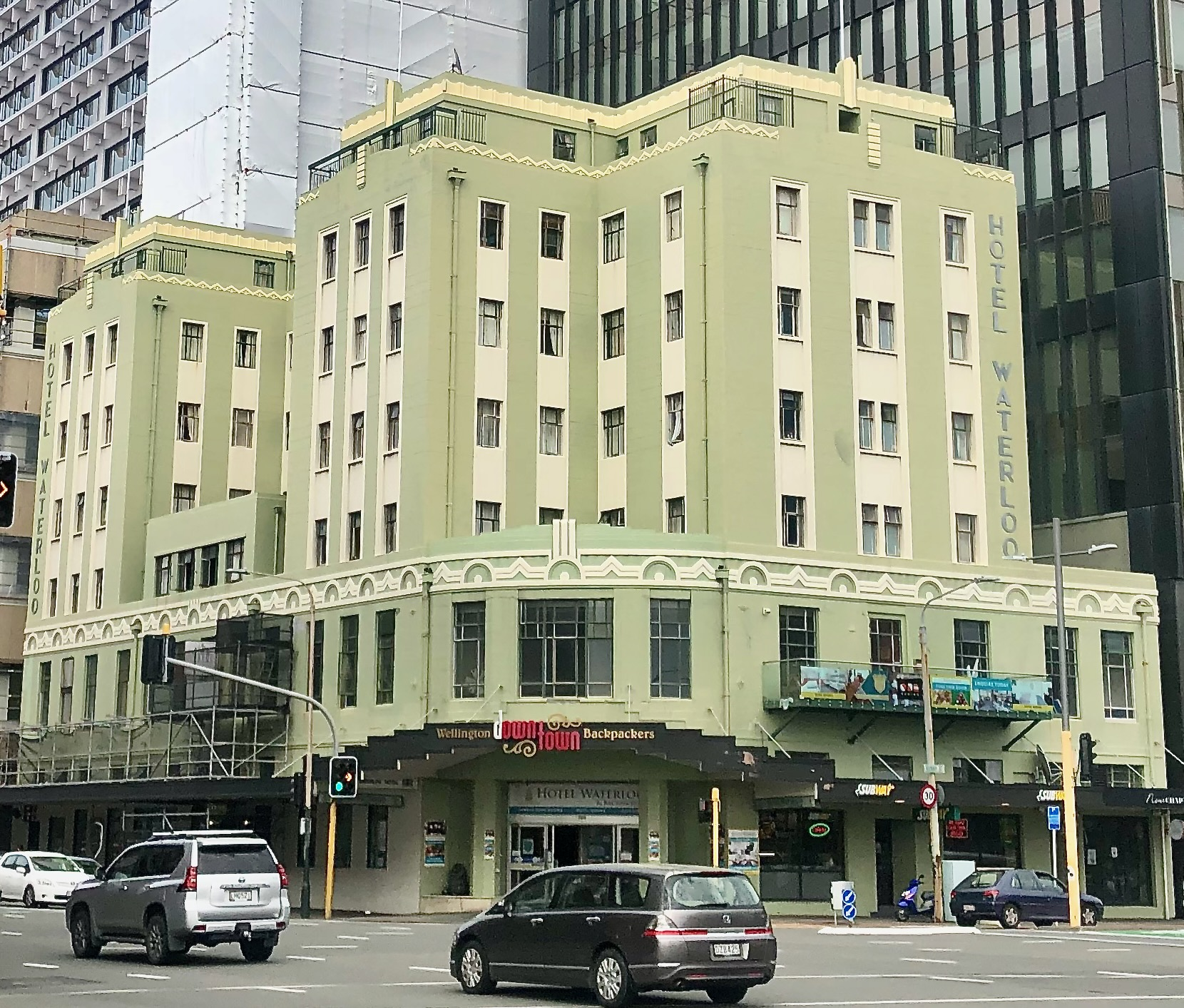
  Hotel Waterloo, Wellington
- Mutual Life & Citizens Assurance Company Building (Mitchell and Mitchell), Wellington, 1940
- National War Memorial, Wellington, 1932
- former Post and Telegraph Building, Wellington, 1939
- Prudential Assurance Building (Hennessey & Hennessey), Wellington, 1934

=== Canterbury ===
- Masonic Hotel, St. Andrews, Canterbury

==== Christchurch ====
- Majestic Theatre, Christchurch (demolished 2014)
- West Avon Flats, Christchurch

=== Otago ===
==== Dunedin ====
- Hercus Building, University of Otago Medical School, Dunedin, 1948
- Hocken Collections Library, University of Otago, Dunedin, 1951
- Law Courts Hotel, Dunedin
- Rialto Cinema, Dunedin
- Toitū Otago Settlers Museum transport wing (former NZR bus depot), Dunedin

==== Ranfurly ====
- Centennial Milk Bar (now the Rural Art Deco Gallery), Ranfurly, 1930s
- Ranfurly Auto Building, Ranfurly, 1950 (demolished 2011)
- Ranfurly Hotel, Ranfurly, mid-1930s

=== Southland ===
==== Nightcaps ====
- Town Hall, Nightcaps

== Papua New Guinea ==
- Papua New Guinea Banking Corporation Headquarters, Port Moresby, 1977
- Jacksons International Airport Terminal, Port Moresby 1959

== See also ==
- List of Art Deco architecture
- Art Deco topics
- Streamline Moderne architecture
