= United Manawatu Lodge =

Building in Palmerston North, New Zealand

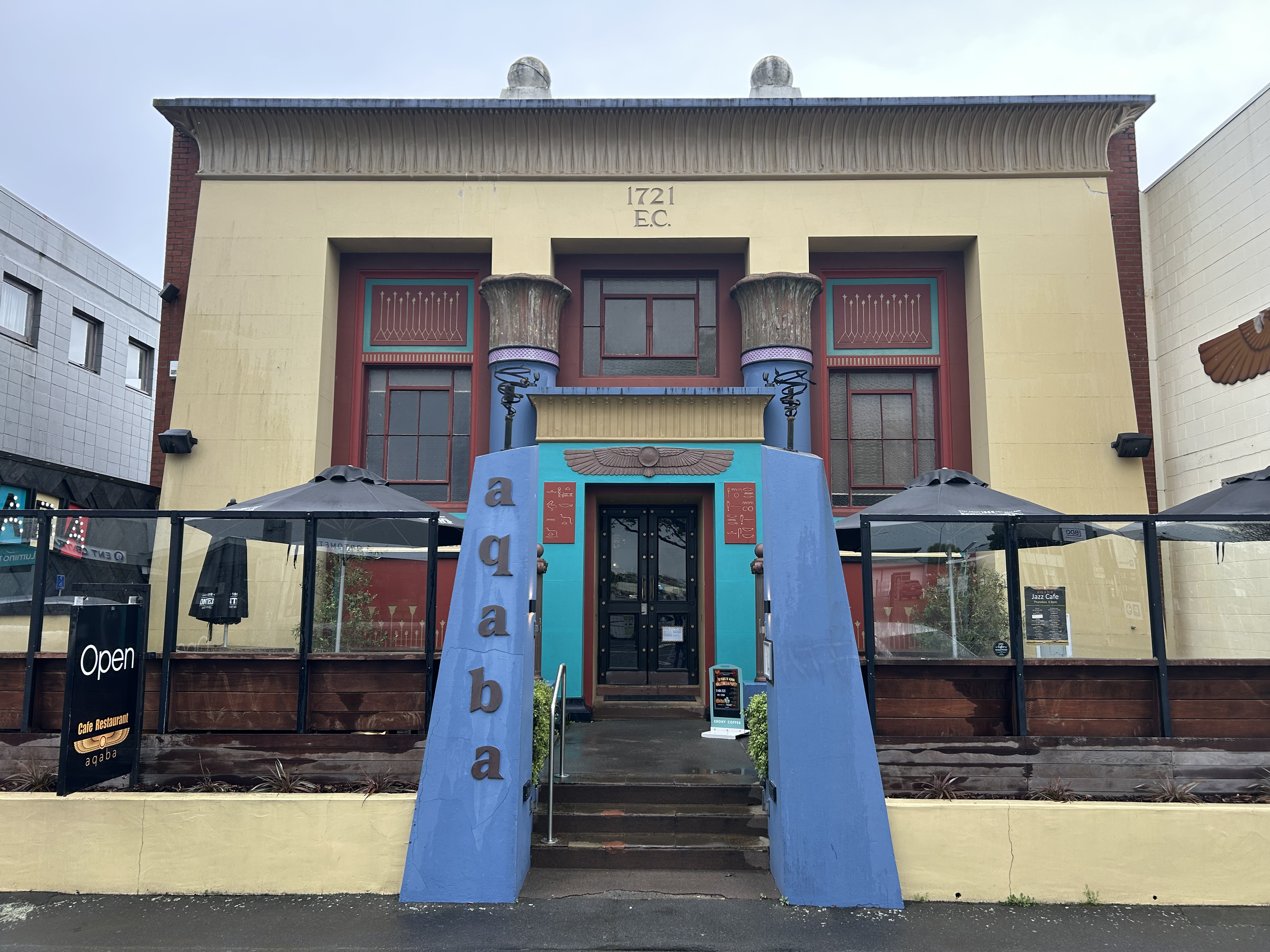
- Interactive map of the United Manawatu Lodge area
- Alternative names: Aqaba Restaurant

General information
- Type: Masonic temple
- Architectural style: Art Deco
- Location: Palmerston North, 186 Broadway Avenue, New Zealand
- Coordinates: 40°21′9.7″S 175°37′0.7″E
- Inaugurated: 24 July 1931

Design and construction
- Architect: Ernst V West
- Main contractor: Anderson & Williamson

Heritage New Zealand – Category 2
- Designated: 24 April 1997
- Reference no.: 7378

The United Manawatu Lodge also known as Aqaba Restaurant is a heritage-listed art deco building at 186 Broadway Avenue in Palmerston North, New Zealand. The building is a former masonic temple, dedicated by the United Manawatu Lodge on 24 July 1931. The lodge sold the building and moved out in the 1980s, and it was then used for a variety of purposes until 1995 when it became the Aqaba nightclub and subsequently Aqaba restaurant.

== History ==
The United Manawatu Lodge of the Ancient Order of Freemasons was established in 1877. The first Lodge temple was opened in 1880, on a site on Main Street. In 1892, the lodge moved to a new building in Broad Street (subsequently Broadway Avenue), when their original site was required for the construction of railway yards. The first Broad Street building eventually became unfit for purpose and was moved off site to allow a new temple to be built. The new building was dedicated on 24 July 1931.

The designer of the Egyptian-themed masonic temple at 186 Broadway Avenue was a local architect Ernst West, who was also a Freemason. The building included living quarters and had a theatre in the rear section. The Freemasonry movement has a history of interest in Egyptian motifs and symbolism. Egyptian-themed masonic buildings became popular during the art deco period, partly in response to the global interest in ancient Egypt that followed the discovery of the tomb of Tutankhamun in 1922.

The ceiling was painted with a "celestial canopy" of night and day scenes, and the floor covering was a blue tessellated carpet that had been imported from Scotland. An Egyptian-themed mural in the refectory depicted the "jury of gods at the judgment of the soul" including the ancient Egyptian gods Osiris and Anubis and other deities and characters. There are large pillars either side of the doorway, with two panels facing the front porch marked with hieroglyphics, that have been translated as: "Thy name shall live upon earth; thy name shall endure upon earth, thou shalt never perish; thou shalt never come to an end."

The '1721 E.C.' above the entrance is the United Manawatu Lodge registration number, where 'E.C.' is an abbreviation of 'English Constitution'.

By the 1980s, the United Manawatu Lodge found that the building was costly to maintain, and decided to sell and move to the Manawatu Kilwinning Lodge. Many interior fittings were removed following sale. The building was rented by an electrical business but was sold again. In 1995, the building was converted into a nightclub, and then after four years the owners refocused on the restaurant trade. In 1996, the building won an award in the regional New Zealand Institute of Architects Resene Colour Awards.

In 1997 the building was listed by Heritage New Zealand as a Category 2 Historic Place.

In 2019 the Aqaba restaurant was offered for sale by its owners Graeme and Marie Donald who had owned the business for 25 years. It was sold to new owners in 2020.
