= Kyle House, Sydney =

Kyle House
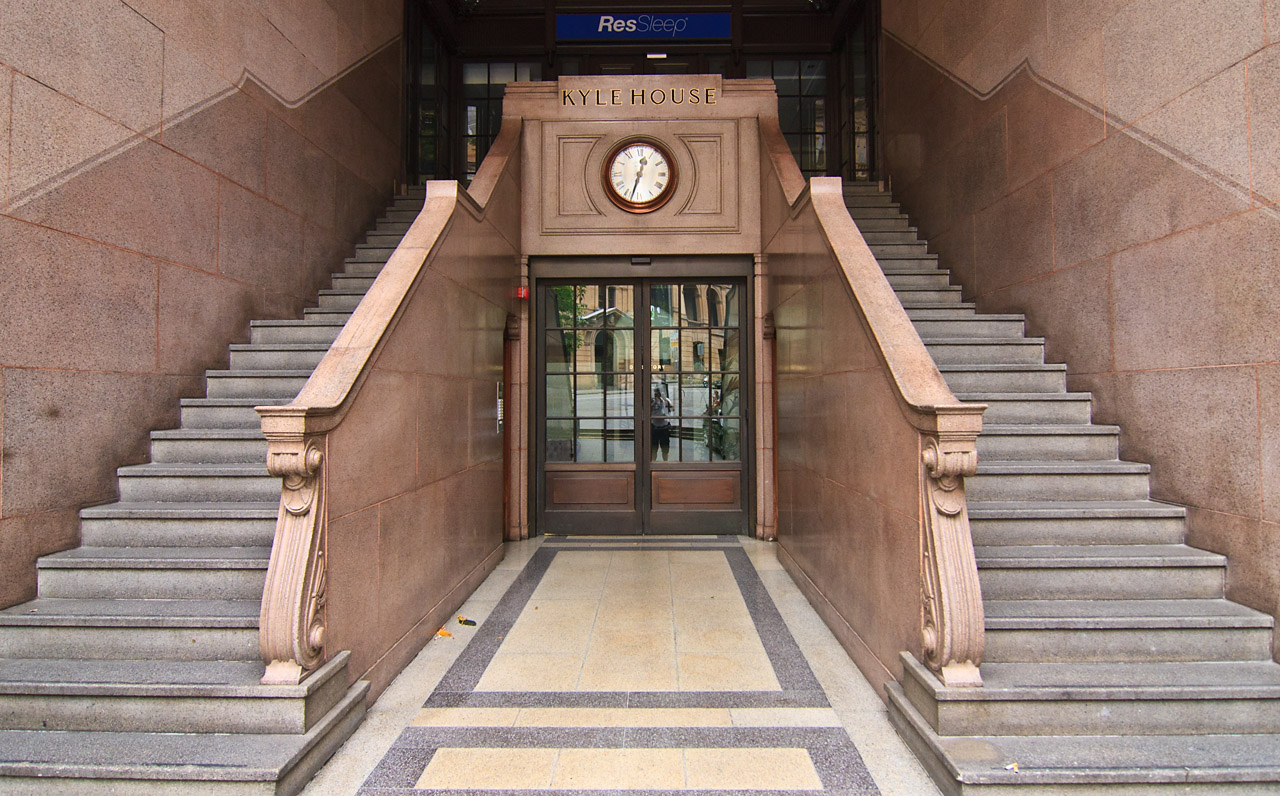
- The foyer of Kyle House, pictured in 2010

- Location within Sydney Location within Australia
- 33.8632°S 151.2094°E
- Location: 27–31 Macquarie Place, Sydney, Australia

History
- Built: 1931

Site notes
- Architect: C. Bruce Dellit
- Architectural style: Inter-war Art Deco

New South Wales Heritage Register
- Official name: Kyle House
- Type: State heritage (built)
- Designated: 2 April 1999
- Reference no.: 654
- Type: Commercial Office/Building
- Category: Commercial
- Builders: Stuart Bros

Kyle House is a heritage-listed commercial office at 27-31 Macquarie Place, in the Sydney central business district, in the City of Sydney local government area of New South Wales, Australia. It was designed by C. Bruce Dellit and built during 1931 by Stuart Bros. The property is privately owned. It was added to the New South Wales State Heritage Register on 2 April 1999.

== History ==
Macquarie Place Park is literally the hub of New South Wales, as the obelisk erected there by Governor Macquarie in 1818 was the datum point for all distances in the colony. The west side of the triangular reserve was available for private purchase, while the south side was occupied by official buildings and on the east was The Government Domain. Significant emancipist traders such as Mary Reibey and Simeon Lord bought land on the west side and Lord's famous three-storied sandstone mansion with its warehouse next to the Tank Stream occupied the site of the future Kyle House. Lord's property, reduced somewhat by a land exchange with the government, remained in the hands of Lord's widow until her death in 1864 and was thereafter owned by their son George William Lord and his family until 1920.

From the 1890s the property was leased to the McArthur Shipping Co, founded by Alexander McArthur (1814–1909), an Irish Methodist entrepreneur who had come to Sydney around 1840 and established a major retail and wholesale enterprise, with branches in Melbourne, Adelaide and Auckland finally a head office in London, which by 1880 represented "all the colonial houses in the English and European markets".

The McArthur Shipping and Agency Co Ltd bought the Sydney property in 1929 and in 1931 commissioned architect C. Bruce Dellit to design a new building for the site. Lord's building was entirely demolished and Kyle House opened towards the end of 1931, constructed by Stuart Bros.

The principal occupant was McArthur, but there were numerous tenants in the rest of the building, including Dellit. Shortly after a major internal renovation in 1983, McArthur sold Kyle House to the Mercantile and General Life Assurance Co of Australia Ltd.

== Description ==
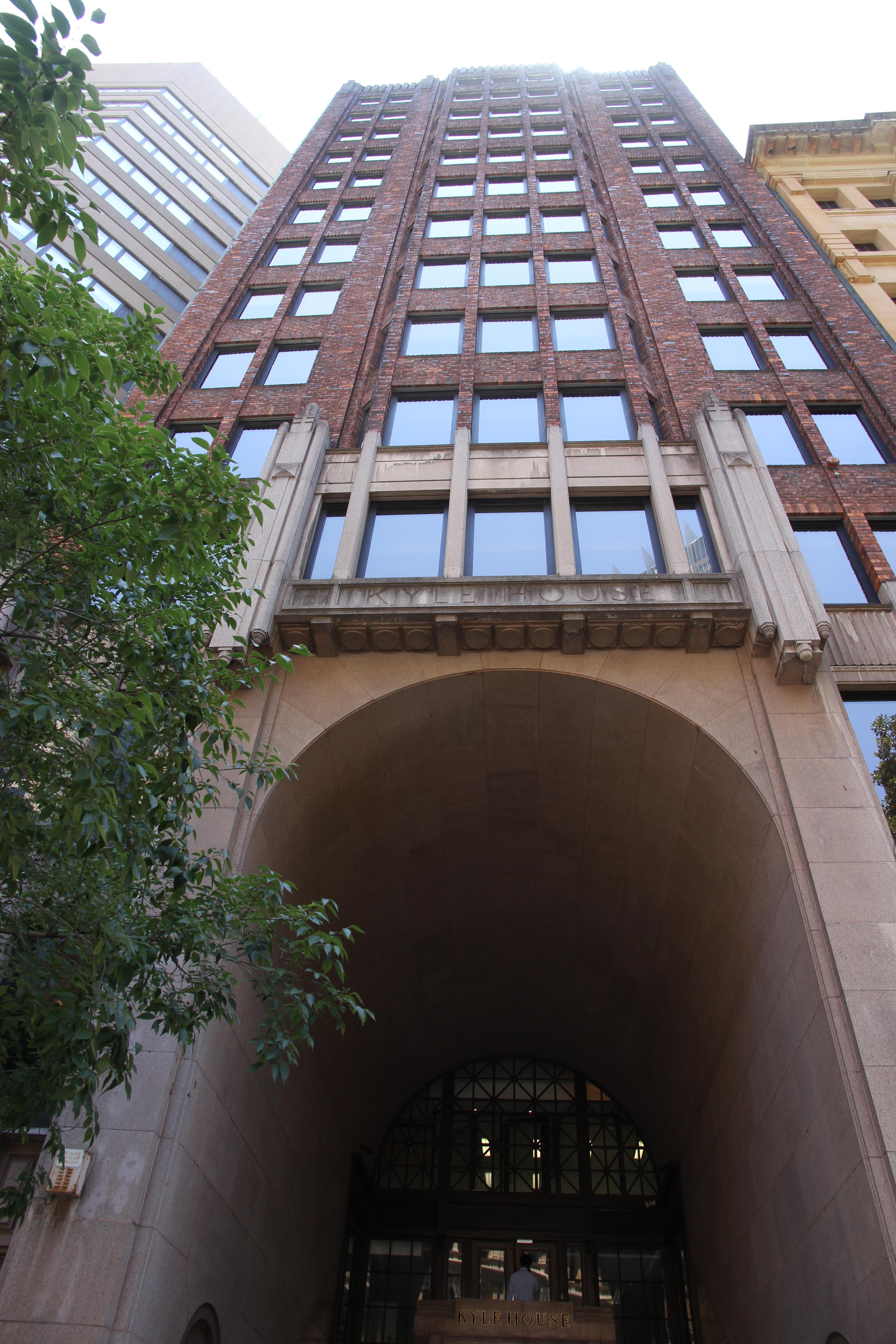
The upper facade of Kyle House, pictured in 2019.

Precast concrete panel/decoration, Face brick, Alumin. frame windows Rendered masonry, Steel/alumin. frame windows.

=== Condition ===
As at 18 September 2002, refer to Archaeological Zoning Plan The upper floors of the building are cantilevered over the rear courtyard. The building is generally in good condition.

== Heritage listing ==
As at 1 November 2006, the site of Kyle House is of state significance as the centre of two major commercial empires, Lord's and McArthur's, since the eighteenth century. Its site on the east bank of the Tank Stream is also significant. The present building has high historical significance as one of the two surviving office buildings designed by Dellit, the architect, who died young. Kyle House is aesthetically significant as an important example of Inter-war Art Deco style emphasising verticality and detail of cladding materials. It represents an early attempt to discard historical stylism and search for architectural forms and decorative elements more relevant to the 20th century.

Together with the adjacent commercial buildings in Macquarie Place, Kyle House forms an important landmark feature, and contributes to the historic streetscape character. The rear courtyard and access way arrangement is relatively rare in Sydney today, and reflects the nature of the area's association with the development of shipping and trading from the early 19th century.

Kyle House was listed on the New South Wales State Heritage Register on 2 April 1999 having satisfied the following criteria:

- "The place is important in demonstrating the course, or pattern, of cultural or natural history in New South Wales."

The ground on which Kyle House sits is of state significance as the centre of two major commercial empires, Lord's and McArthur's, since the 18th century. Its site on the eastern bank of the Tank Stream is also significant. Has historic significance at a State level.

Kyle House is important as reflecting the site's close association with shipping and merchant trading during the growth of the colony. The area's association with early traders, being close to circular Quay and the Tank Stream, was strengthened by the opening of the Royal Exchange Building in Bridge Street, directly opposite Macquarie Place in 1851. This was to become the meeting place of merchants, bankers, businessmen and shipping agents, an association which was still relevant at the time of the building of Kyle House, and which still remains today.

Kyle House is important as representative of an era of the construction of prestigious office accommodation in Sydney.

- The place has a strong or special association with a person, or group of persons, of importance of cultural or natural history of New South Wales's history."

Kyle House is significant as a rare example of the commercial work of the prominent architect C. Bruce Dellit in 1931, who was to become a leading progressive architect in Sydney during this period, however died at a young age. It was the first commercial building designed by Dellit after starting his private practice in 1929. The structure is an example of his technical skills and use of construction materials of the period, reflecting the architect's innovative and progressive methodology.

The site for Kyle House is of state significance as the centre of two major commercial empires, being Simeon Lord's and McArthur's, since the eighteenth century.

- "The place is important in demonstrating aesthetic characteristics and/or a high degree of creative or technical achievement in New South Wales."

Kyle House is aesthetically significant as an important example of Inter-War Art Deco style emphasising verticality and detail of cladding materials. It represents an early attempt to discard historical stylism and search for architectural forms and decorative elements more relevant to the 20th century. The gigantic scale of the ground floor arch is notable, and found also in Delfin House, the other surviving office building by this architect. The building forms an important part of the streetscape to Macquarie Place. Has aesthetic significance locally.

Kyle House is significant as one of the first office buildings constructed in Sydney which broke away from the traditional stylism, in an early attempt to search for architectural forms and decorative elements more relevant to the 20th century. Kyle House reflects the influence of the American skyscraper and the high esteem and commercialism that it symbolised.

Kyle House is significant within the CBD of Sydney, as one of a group of buildings which contributes to the historic townscape character overlooking Macquarie Place, with a diversity of building forms and scales.

- "The place has a strong or special association with a particular community or cultural group in New South Wales for social, cultural or spiritual reasons."

Kyle House has continued to serve the community as a place of commercial enterprise since its construction in 1931. It demonstrates, through its consistent nature of tenants, its link with the harbour and commercial activities of this area of the city.

- "The place has potential to yield information that will contribute to an understanding of the cultural or natural history of New South Wales."

Kyle House is a good example of office building of this era reflecting the planning restrictions of the day as regarding height, and employed an early use of the cantilevered structural concrete, demonstrating the potential of this form of material.

The course of the Tank Stream ran along the western border of Kyle House and there may be some archaeological remains of significance under the rear courtyard. The sandstone wall along the northern side of the courtyard has archaeological significance as an early party wall dating from 1866.

- "The place possesses uncommon, rare or endangered aspects of the cultural or natural history of New South Wales."

Kyle House is significant as a rare example of the commercial work of the architect C. Bruce Dellit in Sydney. It is one of only two office buildings designed by Dellit in private practice.

Kyle House is significant as one of the few remaining examples of Inter-War Art Deco style office buildings within the CBD of Sydney. The building is significant as a good example of a style limited in representation today, the façade of which has generally remained in its original form and configuration since construction in 1931.

The rear courtyard and access way arrangement at Kyle House is significant, for its relative rarity in Sydney today, and as a reflection of the nature of the areas association with the development of shipping and trading from the early 19th century.

- "The place is important in demonstrating the principal characteristics of a class of cultural or natural places/environments in New South Wales."

Kyle House is significant as a representative example of office building constructed during an era of construction of prestigious office accommodation in Sydney.

The Kyle House site is significant for its close association with shipping and merchant trading, of which Macquarie Place provided a central focus for trading activities given its close proximity to Circular Quay and the Tank Stream.

Kyle House is significant as a representative example of the building heights that were allowed at the time of city ordinances. It also contributes to the aesthetic quality of the streetscape of Macquarie Place due to its scale and richness of materials and details.

== See also ==
- Australian non-residential architectural styles
- Macquarie Place Park
