= Anzac Memorial =

Heritage-listed war memorial in Sydney, New South Wales, Australia

- Australia
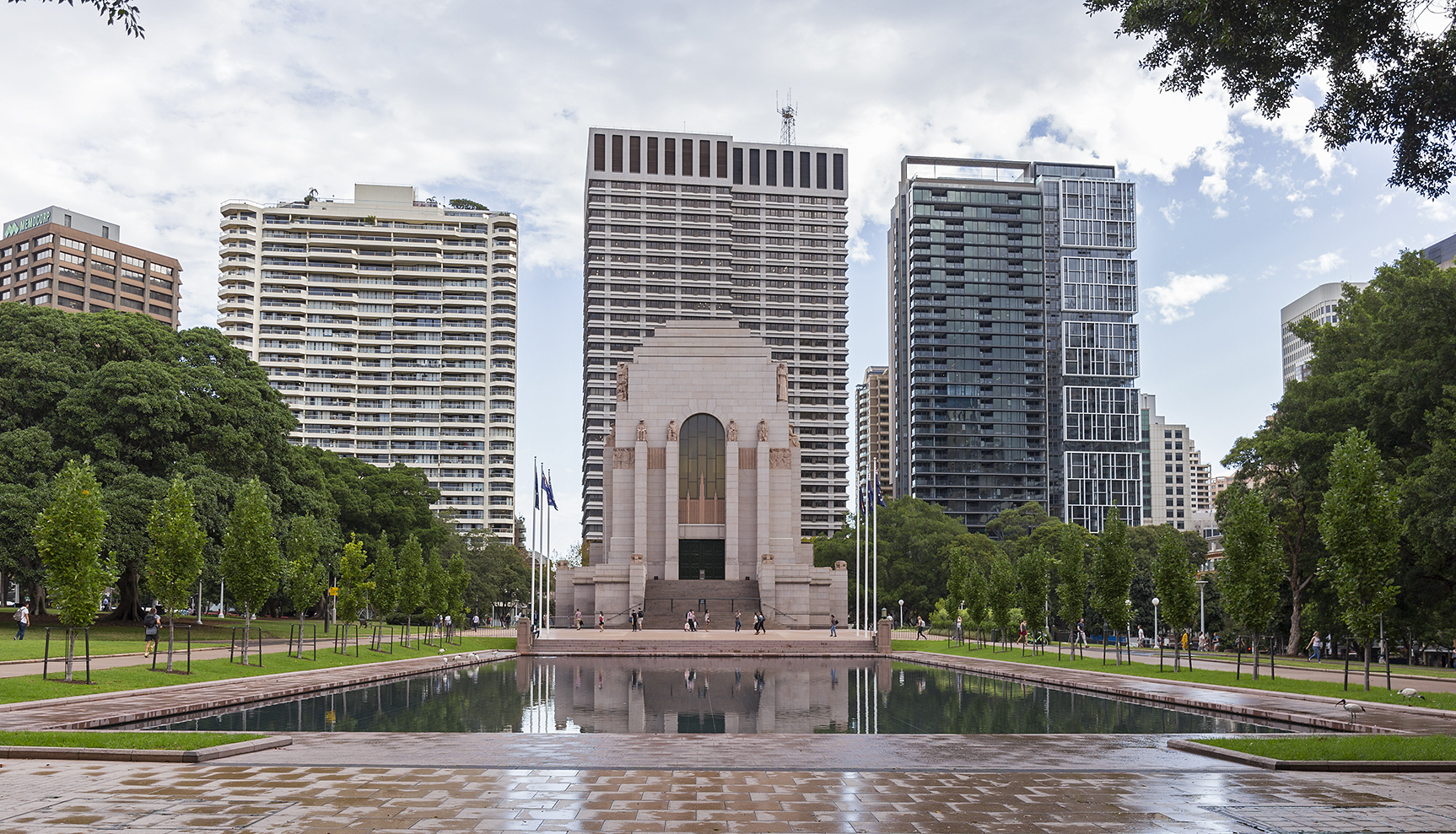
- Anzac Memorial, Hyde Park, Sydney
- For the Australian Imperial Force dead of World War I
- Unveiled: 24 November 1934; 91 years ago
- Location: 33°52′32″S 151°12′39″E; Hyde Park, Sydney, New South Wales, Australia
- Designed by: Bruce Dellit; Rayner Hoff

New South Wales Heritage Register
- Official name: Anzac Memorial; War Memorial Hyde Park; Hyde Park Memorial
- Type: State heritage (built)
- Criteria: a., b., c., d., f., g.
- Designated: 23 April 2010
- Reference no.: 1822
- Type: War Memorial
- Category: Monuments and Memorials
- Builders: Kell & Rigby

The Anzac Memorial is a heritage-listed war memorial, museum and monument located in Hyde Park South near Liverpool Street in the CBD of Sydney, New South Wales, Australia. The Art Deco monument was designed by C. Bruce Dellit, with the exterior adorned with monumental figural reliefs and sculptures by Rayner Hoff, and built from 1932 to 1934 by Kell & Rigby. This state-owned property was added to the New South Wales State Heritage Register on 23 April 2010.

The memorial is the focus of commemoration ceremonies on Anzac Day, Remembrance Day and other important occasions. It was built as a memorial to the Australian Imperial Force of World War I. Fund raising for a memorial began on 25 April 1916, the first anniversary of the Australian and New Zealand Army Corps (ANZAC) landing at Anzac Cove for the Battle of Gallipoli. It was opened on 24 November 1934 by Prince Henry, Duke of Gloucester. In 2018, refurbishments and a major expansion were completed. The memorial was officially reopened by Prince Harry, Duke of Sussex. In 2025, the Parliament of New South Wales declared the memorial building as "the principal memorial in New South Wales to Australians who serve in wars and peacekeeping missions."

== History ==
=== Aboriginal land ===
Material in rock shelters reveals that Aboriginal people inhabited the Sydney Harbour area from at least 25,000 years ago. The Gadigal, who formed part of the Darug nation, were the Aboriginal traditional owners of the inner Sydney area, upon which the Anzac Memorial stands. It is believed that the southern end of Hyde Park, where the ANZAC Memorial is located, was used as a "contest ground" for staging combative trials between Aboriginal warriors, watched avidly by the British in the early days of the colony. It is remarkable that the State's most grand and monumental war memorial should be positioned on this historical site of indigenous combat.

=== Origins of the term "Anzac" ===
The term "Anzac" began as an acronym for the Australian and New Zealand Army Corps in World War I, but it was soon accepted as a word in its own right. The Anzacs formed part of the expeditionary force organised by Britain and France to invade the Gallipoli Peninsula and clear the Dardanelles Straits for the British Royal Navy. The Australian Anzacs represented the national effort from a young nation taking its part in the Great War and reports of the courage they displayed at Gallipoli became the most enduring legend of Australian military history (Government Architect's CMP, 2007).

After the withdrawal from Gallipoli, the Anzac infantry divisions went on to fight against Germany on the Western Front. The Light Horse fought to protect the Suez Canal against the Turks and joined the forces fighting in the Middle East. On the anniversary of Anzac Day in 1918, the Australian infantry reinforced the legend when it stopped the German advance at Villers-Bretonneux on the Somme. Australians were successfully used as shock troops at Ypres, Amiens, Mont St Quentin and Peronne, and took a leading part in breaking through the Hindenburg Line, in their last major offensive.

From an Australian population of around four and a half million, enlistments in the army and navy numbered 416,809, a total that represents one-half of the men of military age in Australia at that time. Altogether, 60,000 Australians were killed and 167,000 were injured, a higher toll proportionately than was suffered by any other British Empire country. Small wonder that those who returned wanted to see the sacrifice of their dead comrades remembered.

The first Anzac Day in NSW was organised by a committee within the Returned Soldiers Association (RSA) of NSW, an organisation formed by men who had been invalided home. Later the organisation was subsumed by the Returned Soldiers' Sailors' (and Airmen's) Imperial League of Australia (RSSILA), finally named the Returned and Services League (RSL). The original objectives of the day of commemoration were to remember dead comrades, induce young men to enlist and collect money for an ANZAC Memorial monument. NSW Premier WA Holman's Labor government promised a pound for pound subsidy to match the money raised on the first Anzac Day. In 1917 the RSSILA requested that 25 April be declared 'Australia's National Day' and gazetted as a public holiday. Both the Queensland and Australian governments made Anzac Day a public holiday in 1921. The official public holiday was first gazetted in NSW in 1925.

=== Developing the memorial concept in Australia ===
Historian Ken Inglis believes that the "war memorial" is a twentieth century concept which memorialised the human cost of war rather than the victorious outcome, as the former military monuments had done, and celebrated the sacrifice of ordinary soldiers rather than focusing on the men who led them. The names of those who made the ultimate sacrifice are differentiated from the names of those who returned. Whether returned or not, the memorials record the soldiers' service to the nation. This trend to list both the returned and the fallen was uniquely Australian, reflecting the all volunteer nature of the Australian forces.

Each capital city developed its own major memorial, with many smaller memorials in the suburbs, and regional areas. The major memorials and their dates of construction are as follows:

- Darwin Cenotaph, Darwin – 1921
- War Memorial, Hobart − 1925
- State War Memorial Cenotaph, Perth – 1928–1929
- Shrine of Remembrance, Brisbane – 1930
- National War Memorial, Adelaide – 1931
- Shrine of Remembrance, Melbourne – 1928–1934
- ANZAC Memorial, Sydney – 1934
- Australian War Memorial, Canberra – 1941

The earlier memorials are generally in the form of obelisks, sometimes with applied sculpture, while most of the later examples are commemorative buildings with a range of rooms and uses. The social meanings of war memorials increased in complexity as time went on. The later examples such as the Shrine of Remembrance in Melbourne, 1934, the ANZAC Memorial in Sydney, 1934 and the Australian War Memorial in Canberra, 1941, represented the new trends in the symbolism of memorials more than the simple columns, obelisks and statues of citizen soldiers erected during the fighting and immediately after it. The Shrine of Remembrance in Melbourne is the most comparable monument to the ANZAC Memorial in Australia, both comprising one principal commemorative space, surrounded and above a series of administrative and exhibition spaces, contained within an imposing landmark building in differing architectural styles, set within a formal landscape.

=== Authorising the ANZAC Memorial ===
In 1918 the RSSILA in 1918 published its aims for the monument:

1. The building was to be a memorial for those who died;
2. It was to be architecturally worthy of its high purpose;
3. It was to provide headquarters for those working to assist widows and children of those who were killed and also, those AIF members who returned;
4. It was to house the records of the AIF;
5. It would be a meeting place and a source of assistance with repatriation; and
6. It would provide a centre for any later campaigns on behalf of the AIF and their dependants.

After 1919, all the state's war memorial building committees were required to seek expert advice from a War Memorials Advisory Committee comprising representatives from the Town Planning Association, Institute of Architects (NSW), Royal Society of Artists and the National Art Gallery (NSW). A proposal to build the memorial on Observatory Hill was withdrawn due to the planned proximity of the roads leading onto the Sydney Harbour Bridge. The proposal to use part of Hyde Park for the Anzac Memorial was promoted by former city surveyor Norman Weekes who was redesigning Hyde Park after it had been virtually destroyed during the construction of the city railway. Assisted by architect Raymond McGrath, Weekes produced a plan with two axial avenues running north -south and east–west, the latter being in line with the transept of St Mary's Cathedral. He envisaged the intersection of these avenues as an ideal site for a commemorative column and balanced that with an Anzac Memorial at the southern end. However, progress on the memorial was impeded until legislation established a board of trustees for the building and the manner in which the site would be chosen was passed in 1923.

The Trustees gained Parliamentary approval for Weekes' plan in 1929 on the condition that the area dedicated to the memorial would be limited in size. The Advisory Board for the Hyde Park Remodelling chose the southern end of the park to site the monument. The National Council of Women and Anzac Fellowship of Women objected to this site because it was considered to be insufficiently commanding, while artist Julian Ashton pointed out that skyscrapers would soon overshadow its position.

About this time another war memorial was bequeathed to Australians by the late JF Archibald, co-founder of the Bulletin newspaper, to commemorate the association of Australia and France in the Great War of 1914–1918. Created by Francois Sicard, winner of the Prix de Rome in 1891, the Public Trustee requested that it be installed at the site of Weekes' proposed column at the northern end of Hyde Park. Major Hubert Colette and JB Waterhouse supervised the erection of the Archibald Memorial Fountain, which was completed on 14 March 1932. This was when work was beginning on the ANZAC Memorial building at the southern end of the same avenue.

Debates about the style of the ANZAC Memorial can be generally divided into soldiers' versus women's groups which supported utility versus beauty respectively. The majority of returned soldiers looked for a building that would meet their immediate needs for association, while women's groups tended to favour a structure that would be commemorative. After ten years of debate, the RSSILA and the disabled veterans bodies all agreed on Anzac Day 1928 that the building "should be commemorative rather than utilitarian". As the RSSILA state president Fred Davison expressed it, the League had finally agreed to a "shrine of remembrance" such as their Victorian counterparts had begun to build. The soldiers' needs were not entirely abandoned and in the spirit of compromise one-seventh of the funding was allocated to incorporate offices where the returned soldiers' organisations could look after their members.

=== The Cenotaph, Martin Place ===
The uncertainty about both site and building style of the ANZAC Memorial combined with the long wait for its construction left Sydney without a focal point for Anzac Day ceremonies. Around 1925 the Lang Labor government responded to the urging of the NSW RSSILA by donating 10,000 pounds for a cenotaph in Martin Place, near where wartime appeals and recruitment rallies had been held. This was also the place where the Armistice Day crowds had honoured their "Glorious Dead" at the war's end on 11 November 1918. It was consecrated on 8 August 1927, becoming the focus of Anzac Day ceremonies some eight years before the ANZAC Memorial building was available for such purposes. Sydney's Anzac Day Dawn Service was never moved to the ANZAC Memorial because the Cenotaph had already become the accepted site and Martin Place had stronger war-time associations than Hyde Park.

=== The ANZAC Memorial design competition ===
A competition for the design of the memorial was commissioned on 13 July 1929. Entrants were required to be Australians qualified to work as architects within or outside NSW, the latter persons being required to register in the state if they won. Competitors could confer with an Australian sculptor, either while designing the competition entry or during its construction. All entrants had to register by 30 January 1930 and present their entries two weeks later. The judges were Professor A. S. Hook, Dean of the Sydney University Faculty of Architecture Professor Leslie Wilkinson, and the Public Trustee E. J. Payne. The winner would be appointed the ANZAC Memorial architect. The cost of the building was limited to £75,000 calculated at rates current at the time of entry. In addition to the memorial itself the building was required to provide office accommodation for the Returned Soldiers and Sailors Imperial League, TB Soldiers' Association and the Limbless Soldiers' Association. The trustees received 117 entries in the competition and chose seven for second stage consideration which were exhibited in the Blaxland Galleries in Farmers Department Store (now Grace Bros). In February 1930 the prize-winning entries were announced by the Governor of New South Wales, Sir Philip Game. Third prize was awarded to Peter Kaad, second prize to John D. Moore and the winner was Bruce Dellit. The successful contractors for the building works were Kell & Rigby. According to Building magazine, most people agreed that Dellit's design for the ANZAC Memorial was the best in the competition.

In his entry, Dellit submitted a model with photographs of it from all angles and 17 drawing sheets including an aerial perspective and an isometric section in Dellit's own words: "ENDURANCE COURAGE AND SACRIFICE – these are the three thoughts which have inspired the accompanying design, and it is around the last mentioned that it develops". Dellit explained that the central sculpture "sacrifice" was placed in the lower chamber "like a famous French tomb" – Napoleon's tomb – to "offer visitors an opportunity for a quiet, dignified, physical and mental acknowledgment of the message".

==== Bruce Dellit, the architect ====
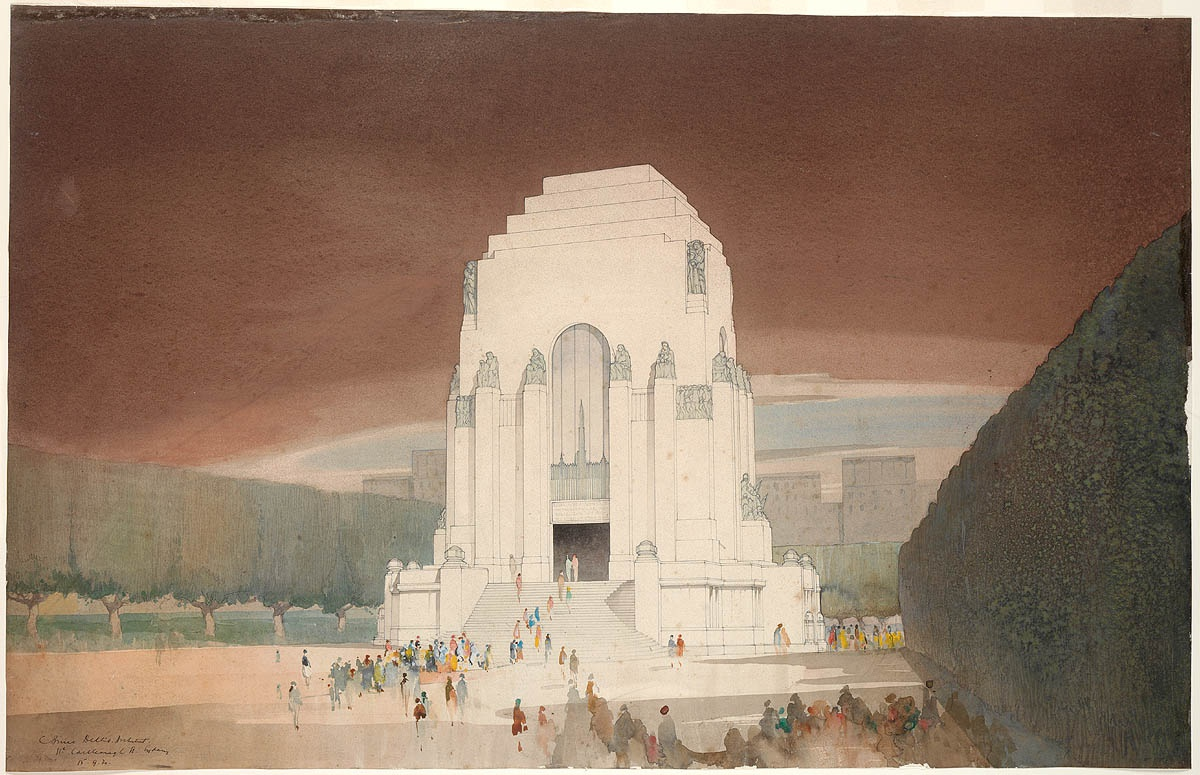
Dellit's architectural sketch of the memorial; 1930

Australian-born Charles Bruce Dellit studied at Sydney Technical College under Byera Hadley from 1912 to 1918 and continued his professional education at the University of Sydney. Dellit registered as an architect in June 1923 and established his own practice six years later. Before winning the ANZAC Memorial competition, he had designed Kyle House in Macquarie Place featuring the "monumental entrance arch" that became one of his characteristic motifs. It also shows his interest in American Art Deco skyscrapers and the patterned brickwork espoused by contemporary Dutch and German schools. Along with his contemporary Emil Sodersten, he is considered to have pioneered the Art Deco style in Australia. Dellit employed a more pronounced use of ornament and symbolism while Sodersten relied more on form and materials for his architecture. Many of the notable Art Deco buildings in Sydney were designed by these architects.

In designing the ANZAC Memorial, Dellit used sculptural and architectural imagery to express collective mourning at the death of so many young men from NSW. The form of the sculpture changed with the involvement of Rayner Hoff, whom Dellit engaged after he had won the competition. Hoff greatly strengthened the imagery by replacing Dellit's seasons and sculptures representing the arts of war and peace with figures representing all branches of the armed services. The Pool of Reflection that mirrors the building on the northern side remains Dellit's call for passers-by to stop and remember.

Similarly, while the central sculpture "Sacrifice" at the heart of the building is Hoff's, the form of the interior, itself very emotive, is Dellit's. Dellit used impressive staircases flanked by memorial urns to lead the visitor up into the Hall of Memory. Once there, they must bow their heads to look into the Well of Contemplation in order to contemplate "Sacrifice", which is in the Hall of Silence below or look up to see the dome decorated with 120,000 golden "Stars of Memory", each representing a serviceman or woman from NSW. Dellit's architecture and Hoff's sculptures greatly enhance each other to provide an artistically integrated emotional message.

According to Maisy Stapleton, the greatest exponents of the Art Deco style in Sydney were the architects C. Bruce Dellit and Emil Sodersten. She considered that Dellit's highest achievement was the ANZAC Memorial, "a vision of modern form and strong, emotive expression closely allied to popular sentiment" and described the memorial as "the epitome of Art Deco in Australia".

Dellit died of cancer on 21 August 1942 only eight years after the ANZAC Memorial was ceremoniously opened. It is considered his finest achievement by some, "a vision of modern form and strong, emotive expression closely allied to popular sentiment." His later works included two chapels at Kinsela's Funeral Parlour, Darlinghurst, 1933 and several bank buildings in the city as well as numerous competition entries. The Bulletin obituary described him as an "arresting and vital figure Everything about him was big".

==== Rayner Hoff, the sculptor ====
George Rayner Hoff was born in 1894 on the Isle of Man. His father later moved the family to Nottingham in England where Rayner Hoff worked in a stonemason's yard while still at school. At 14 he commenced work in an architect's office and later furthered his training by studying drawing and design at the Nottingham School of Art. In 1915 Hoff enlisted in the army and served on the Western Front the following year. After the war he studied sculpture at the Royal College of Art in London under Frances Derwent Wood and in 1922 he won the Prix de Rome.

Hoff arrived in Sydney in August 1923 and began work as head teacher of modelling and sculpture at East Sydney Technical College, Darlinghurst (Sydney's major art school), where he also established his private studio. Hoff exerted an enormous influence on the progress of Australian sculpture. By the end of the decade, Hoff's work at the college produced a school of gifted sculptors and assistants. It was, according to Deborah Edwards, "perhaps the sole instance of a coherent school of production among sculptors in Australian history". In 1925 Hoff completed reliefs for the Dubbo War Memorial and in 1927 he was commissioned to design the sculptures on the National War Memorial, South Australia.

In 1930 Dellit commissioned Hoff to design the sculptures for the ANZAC Memorial. Creating the numerous sculptures on the ANZAC Memorial became the pinnacle of Hoff 's career. The task involved creation of sixteen seated and four standing figures of servicemen and women in cast synthetic stone, four corner cast stone reliefs and two long bronze bas-reliefs over the eastern and western doors outside the building. Hoff's contributions to the interior also included designing the form of the 120,000 faceted gold stars that covered the domed ceiling, four relief panels showing the march of the dead, each superimposed with symbolic representations of the Army, Navy, Air Force and Army Medical Corps, and the marble wreath surrounding the Well of Contemplation that framed the view of Sacrifice below. Hoff and eight assistants were fully employed on the memorial between 1931 and 1934.

Hoff gave considerable prominence to the female contributors to the war effort in the ANZAC Memorial, including the women who lost their fathers, husbands and sons. Nurses were prominent among the figures representing the services and women were central to the group sculpture, "Sacrifice". Hoff explained the prominent position of the women in this work in 1932: "Thousands of women, although not directly engaged in war activities lost all that was dearest to them. There was no acknowledgment of them in casualty lists, lists of wounded, maimed and killed. In this spirit I have shown them carrying their load, the sacrifice of their menfolk".

In 1932 models for the two massive bronze groups intended for placement in front of the east and west windows were publicly exhibited. Hoff's "The Crucifixion of Civilisation 1914" and "Victory after Sacrifice 1918" both featured naked women as the central figures. The violent controversy that greeted the exhibition of these models prevented their development into full-size sculptures, with the sexual aspect of the imagery attracting the most intense criticism. In despair over the controversy, Hoff eventually destroyed the plaster models and refused to compromise his designs when the possibility of making them was raised again in 1934. The sculptures were never completed.

Hoff's other public sculptures in Sydney included a bas-relief of Mercury in Transport House, York Street and several sculptures in Emil Sodersten's City Mutual Life Building in Hunter Street. However, in spite of his obvious success, Hoff was unable to shake the controversy about the unexecuted ANZAC Memorial sculptures. It remained with him until his early death from pancreatitis on 19 November 1937.

=== Builders and contractors ===
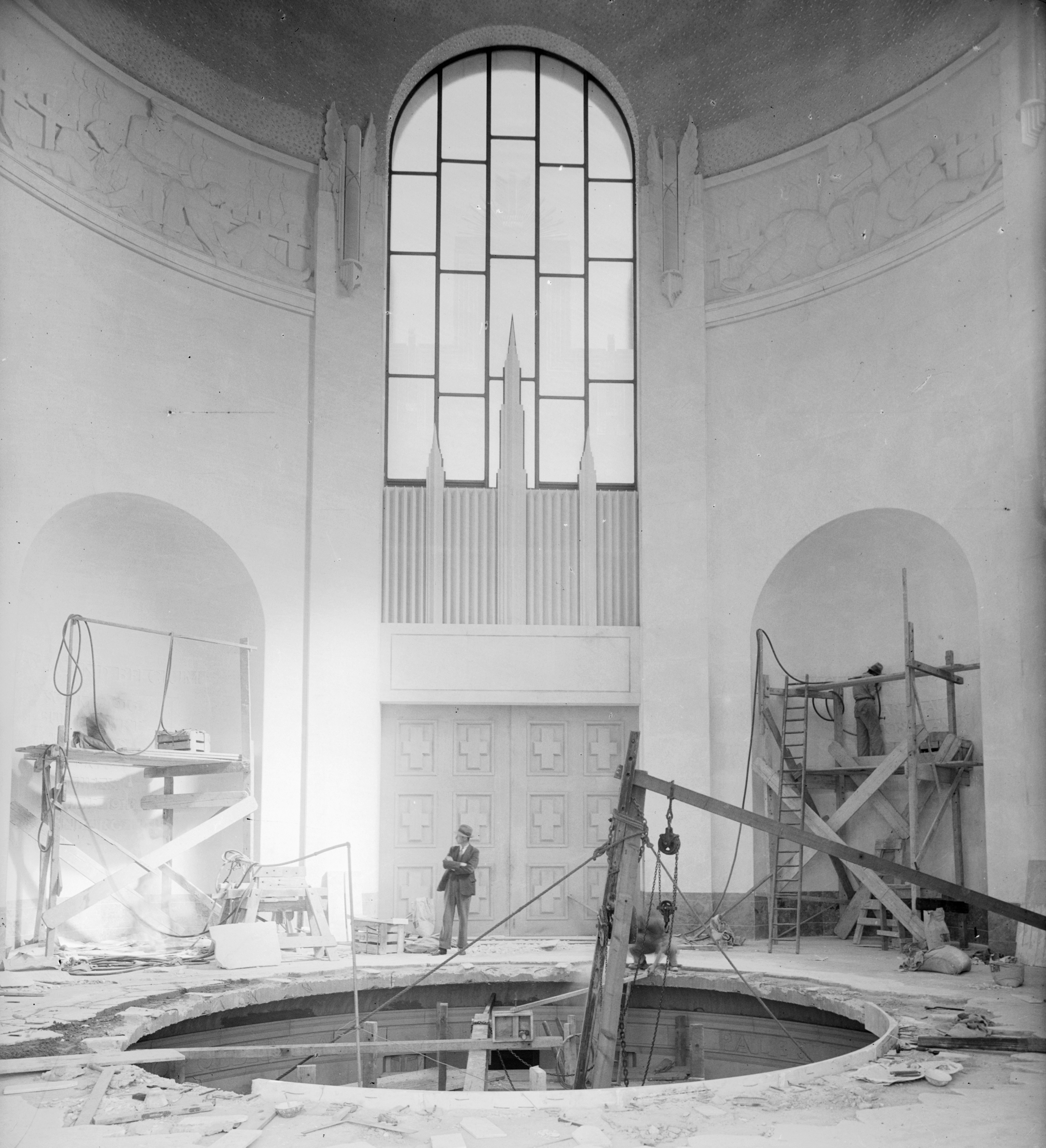
Men working on the construction of the Anzac Memorial, Hyde Park, Sydney, Sydney, c. 1934

The trustees specified that the memorial must be built of Australian materials and by Australian workmen. Having been encouraged to give preference to returned servicemen, the contractors Kell & Rigby applied to the RSSILA Labour Bureau for their workers. Also working on the ANZAC Memorial were numerous sub-contractors. These professionals and artisans included structural engineers RS Morris & Co Ltd, masons Melocco Bros Ltd who carved the wreath around the Well of Contemplation, Messrs Loveridge and Hudson Ltd who prepared the granite facing on the outside walls, JC Goodwin and Co Ltd who supplied the amber glass, Art Glass Ltd, which completed the sandblasting, and T. Grounds and Sons who manufactured the stone figures on the buttresses and the funerary urns to Hoff's design. The London firm of Morris Singer & Co Ltd cast central sculpture and bronze panels over the doors but the flame surrounding the sculpture and the bronze grilles on the lower windows were made in Australia by Castle Bros, while Kell & Rigby themselves produced the bronze nails studding the doors. Homebush Ceiling Works made the ceilings and supplied the 120,000 stars for the dome, the latter being gilded by A. Zimmerman. Kellor and Yates completed the plasterwork. The Electrical and General Installation Co was responsible for the electrical installation and Nielsen and Moller made the light fixtures. Later, Dellit was able to persuade the City Council to supply temporary floodlighting for the building, a service made permanent in 1938.

=== Changes in the course of constructing the ANZAC Memorial ===
Originally, Dellit wanted the memorial to be built of sandstone or synthetic granite on an 18-inch base of Bowral trachyte. However, the building was actually constructed in red granite from quarries near Bathurst, NSW. The podium and semi-circular stairs were faced in granite; and the terrace was formed in terrazzo.

In 1932 Dellit incorporated four stones from battlefields at Gallipoli, France, Palestine and New Guinea into the floors of the niches in the Hall of Memory in the form of the AIF Rising Sun. The names of major battles at each of these sites were added to the niche walls. The dome of stars approved in 1933 was also a late inclusion. This feature began as a fundraiser when the project had lost support through the fracas over Hoff's exterior statues. To cover the shortfall in funding the memorial, the RSSILA offered 150,000 stars for sale at two shillings each. Although they were unable to sell the full number, 120,000 stars were fixed to the ceiling to represent all the state's volunteers. In order to facilitate their attachment to the plaster ceiling, they were fashioned from plaster of Paris and gilded.

In another late change, the interior walls were lined in unpolished marble while polished marble covered the floors. All doors were originally to be bronze but funding shortages caused that specification to be changed to maple, studded with bronze nails. Dellit intended that each of the great amber windows would bear a different design for the Army, Navy, Air Force and Medical Corps. However, the building subcommittee asked for an alternative and a new design was etched on all the windows which combined the AIF symbol with a pattern of eternal flames.

Dellit always intended that the office accommodation at the base of the building should be incorporated into the memorial when the need for its original use had passed. The ex-servicemen's offices featured joinery in silky oak and parquetry floors of red mahogany. Light fittings in the shape of stars echoed the dome in the Hall of Memories. On the eastern side Dellit added an Assembly Hall to balance the entry foyer on the west. This room had seating for 130 people and was available to all ex-servicemen's groups. In practice it was used mainly by the associations with offices in the building. Its small size and the ban on alcohol (which applied to the whole memorial) meant that few associations sought to hire it. It was not available for outside use from 1942 to 1957 while the RSL occupied it as an extension to their office.

The inscriptions that Dellit intended for the memorial were another casualty of the design process. The trustees consulted the poet Leon Gellert, then Professor Hook, who consulted Professor Mungo McCallum, librarian H. M. Green and historian C. E. W. Bean, about the inscriptions. These experts ruled against most of the numerous labels suggested by Dellit. The surviving inscriptions include those on the foundation stones laid by Governor Game and Premier Bevan on 19 July 1932 which bear the words "A soldier set this stone" and "A citizen set this stone" to indicate the contributions both soldiers and citizens had made to the building. An inscription in the floor at the western entrance to the Hall of Silence, "Let Silent Contemplation be Your Offering" was also kept, as was a list of the major battles in the Hall of Silence. The experts chose a simple statement submitted by Hook, Green and Bean to mark the dedication of the building, stating, "This Memorial was opened by a son of the King on 24th November 1934".

Another feature that was considerably altered was the landscaping. Dellit planned water gardens for either side of the memorial in the form of a narrow pool to the north and a cascading waterfall to the south. However, as the bulk of the building began to rise above the park, it became apparent that the scale of the water features needed to be increased to balance it. As a result, the cascades were eliminated and the pool extended to 170 feet (52 metres) long by 72 feet (22 metres) wide. Landscaping was completed by the City Council, which was responsible for the park. Finance for the additional work came from the state Unemployment Relief Fund and a large number of council employees and relief labourers poured the concrete for the pool in a single day to eliminate the need for joints and ensure that it was watertight. The Council acceded to Dellit's request to keep a clear open space around the memorial. It also followed his plan for a line of poplars on either side of the pool to symbolise the French battlefields. Dellit also wanted beds filled with the red poppies of Flanders and other plantings from the eastern and western fronts.

=== The Opening Ceremony, 24 November 1934 ===
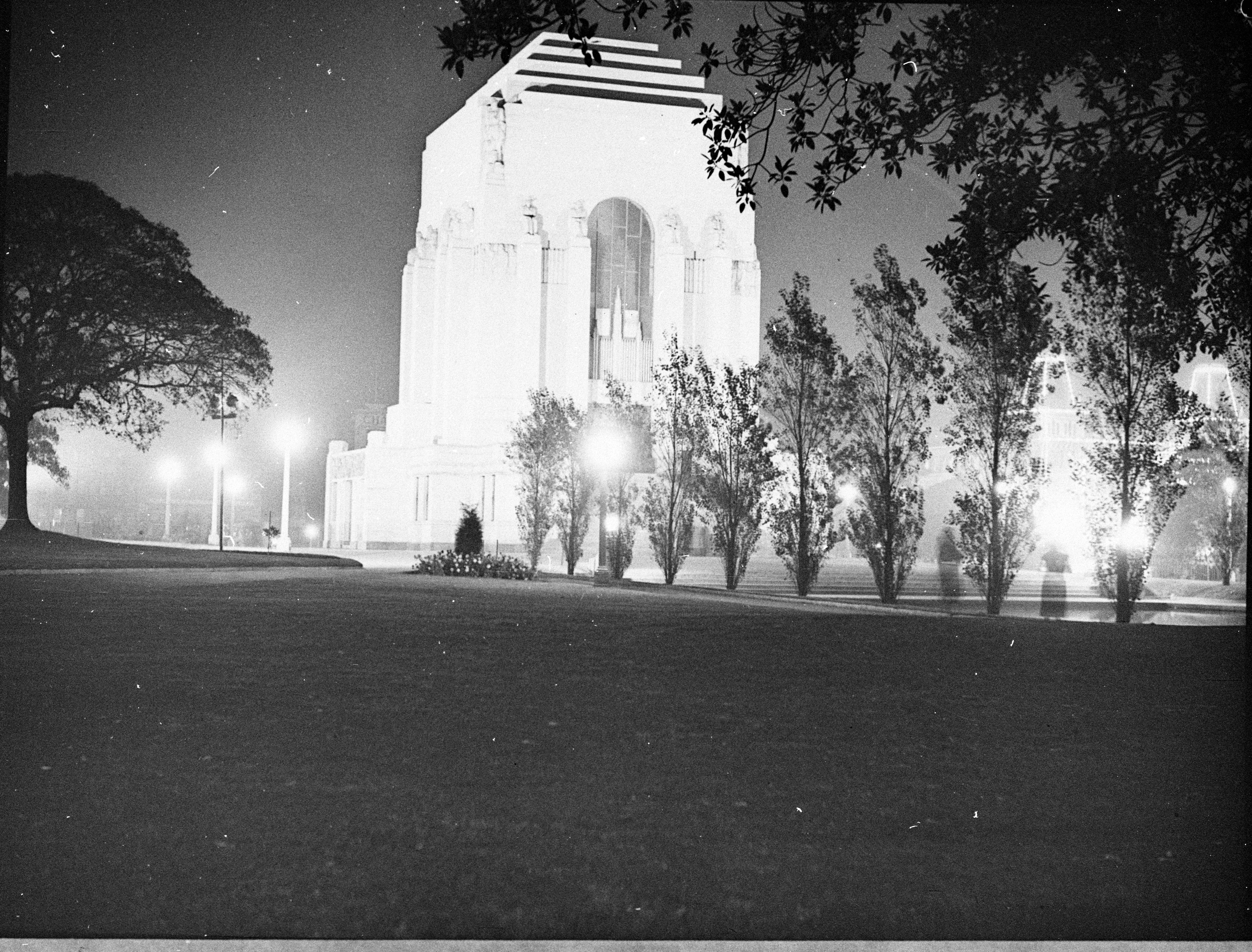
The memorial in 1934

Crowds attending the opening of the ANZAC Memorial were estimated at 100,000. Archbishop Sheehan boycotted the event on the grounds that it was "not entirely Catholic in character". In keeping with the words on the foundation tablets, the ceremony aimed to show that the building was of and for the people. The Duke of Gloucester made the dedication speech and the Anglican Archbishop of Sydney Dr Howard Mowll gave the prayer: 'To the Glory of God, and as a lasting monument of all the members of the Australian Forces of the State of NSW, who served their King and country in the Great War, and especially in grateful remembrance of those who laid down their lives, we dedicate this ANZAC Memorial'.

To familiarise the public with the symbolism of the monument and to mark its completion, in 1934 the Trustees published The Book of the Anzac Memorial in a limited edition. This volume both commemorated and explained the memorial. The December 1934 issue of Building magazine also focused on the ANZAC Memorial, devoted nine pages to explain its details and symbolism.

=== Offices at the memorial ===
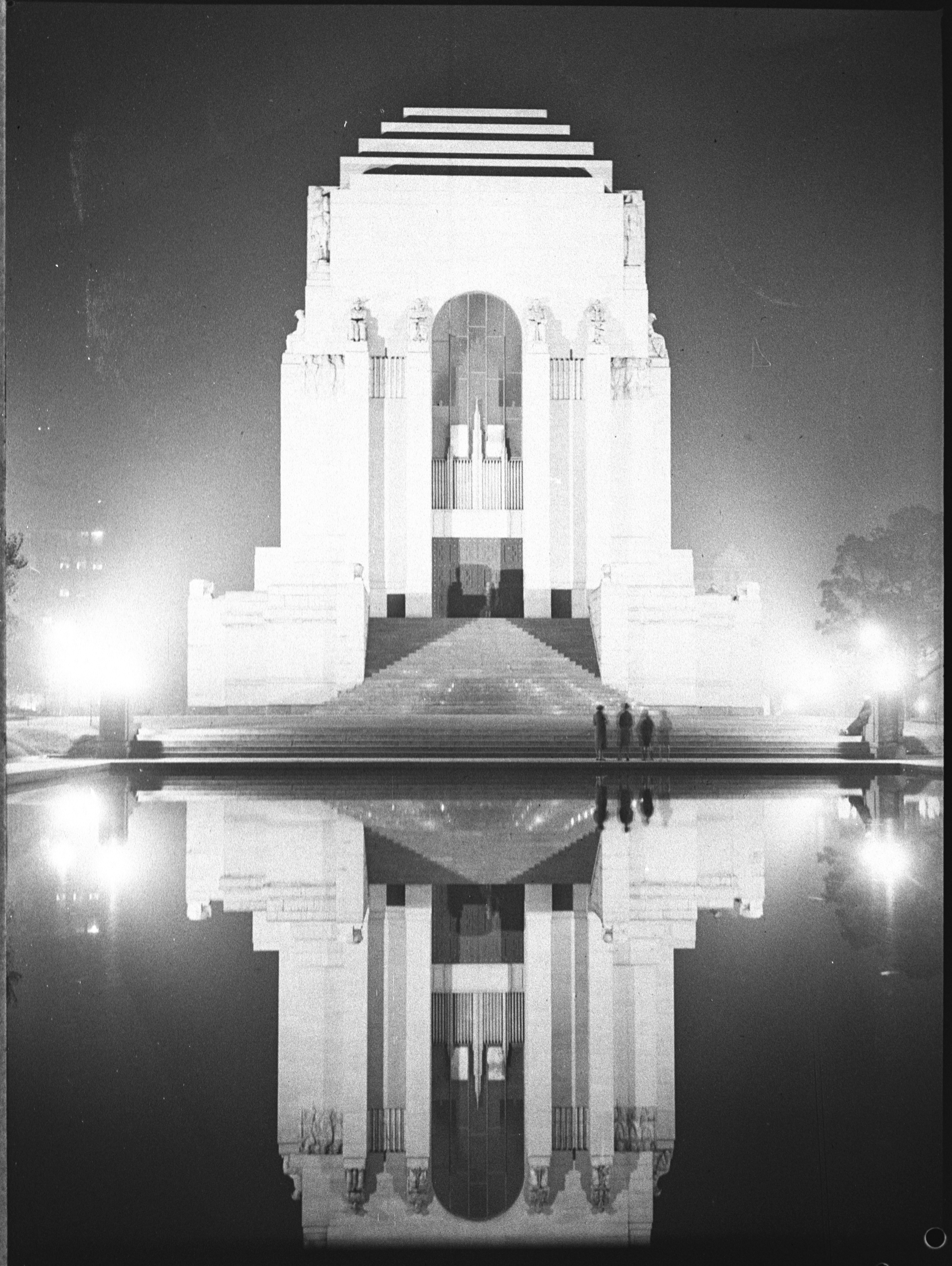
Decorations on the memorial in 1937 during the coronation of George VI and Elizabeth

All associations with offices in the ANZAC Memorial building helped members with their applications to the Repatriation Department and assistance with medical needs. Each office in the memorial had a counter where members could apply for assistance, a waiting lobby, and secretarial and general offices.

By the mid 1930s the ex-servicemen's offices in the ANZAC Memorial were already overcrowded, and the situation became critical when veterans from World War II began accessing the building for services in the 1940s. The RSL gained permission to extend its rooms into the Assembly Hall in 1942 but its situation was not significantly improved until it moved to nearby Anzac House in College Street in 1957. The TB Soldiers, Sailors and Airmen also moved into Anzac House but returned to the ANZAC Memorial in 1980. The Limbless and Maimed Soldiers' Association stayed in the memorial through the whole period that its members survived.

=== Changing perceptions of the ANZAC Memorial ===
Australia was embroiled in World War II less than five years after the ANZAC Memorial opened. Attempts to physically make changes and add additional symbols to reflect this and later wars did not proceed due to difficulties envisaging how this might be achieved without compromising the design.

Although the ANZAC Memorial experienced no significant structural changes, in the latter half of the twentieth century people did tend to assume that it was a memorial for all wars. The memorial also became a symbol of all wars in a negative way, particularly in the case of the Australian Government's support of the United States in Vietnam, which polarised the nation. In the prolonged civil protests about Australian involvement in that war – characterised by the moratorium marches of the late 1960s – the ANZAC Memorial became a rallying point. It was also the site of an anti-war sit-in in 1970 and the centre for a Ban the Bomb protest in 1983. In 1975 feminists inferred it was a symbol of male domination when they painted on it, "Women march for Liberation".

In 1984 an amendment of the Anzac Memorial Building Act of 1923 legally acknowledged the meaning of the ANZAC Memorial that most people had already accepted when it authorised the building's re-dedication as the principal war memorial of NSW. Governor Sir James Rowland performed the ceremony on 30 November, fifty years and six days after the first dedication by the Duke of Gloucester. From that time, the ANZAC Memorial's stated purpose was to honour the men and women of NSW who served in all wars where Australia had been involved.

In the same year a "museum" or exhibition space was established to inform the public both about the wars in which Australia has been involved and those who served in them. It was originally opened on the 50th Anniversary of the official opening of the memorial, on 18 November 1984. A bronze plaque marking the event was mounted on a wall in the Vestibule. A permanent photographic exhibition titled "Australians at War" opened during this month and became a great success with visiting school groups and tourists.

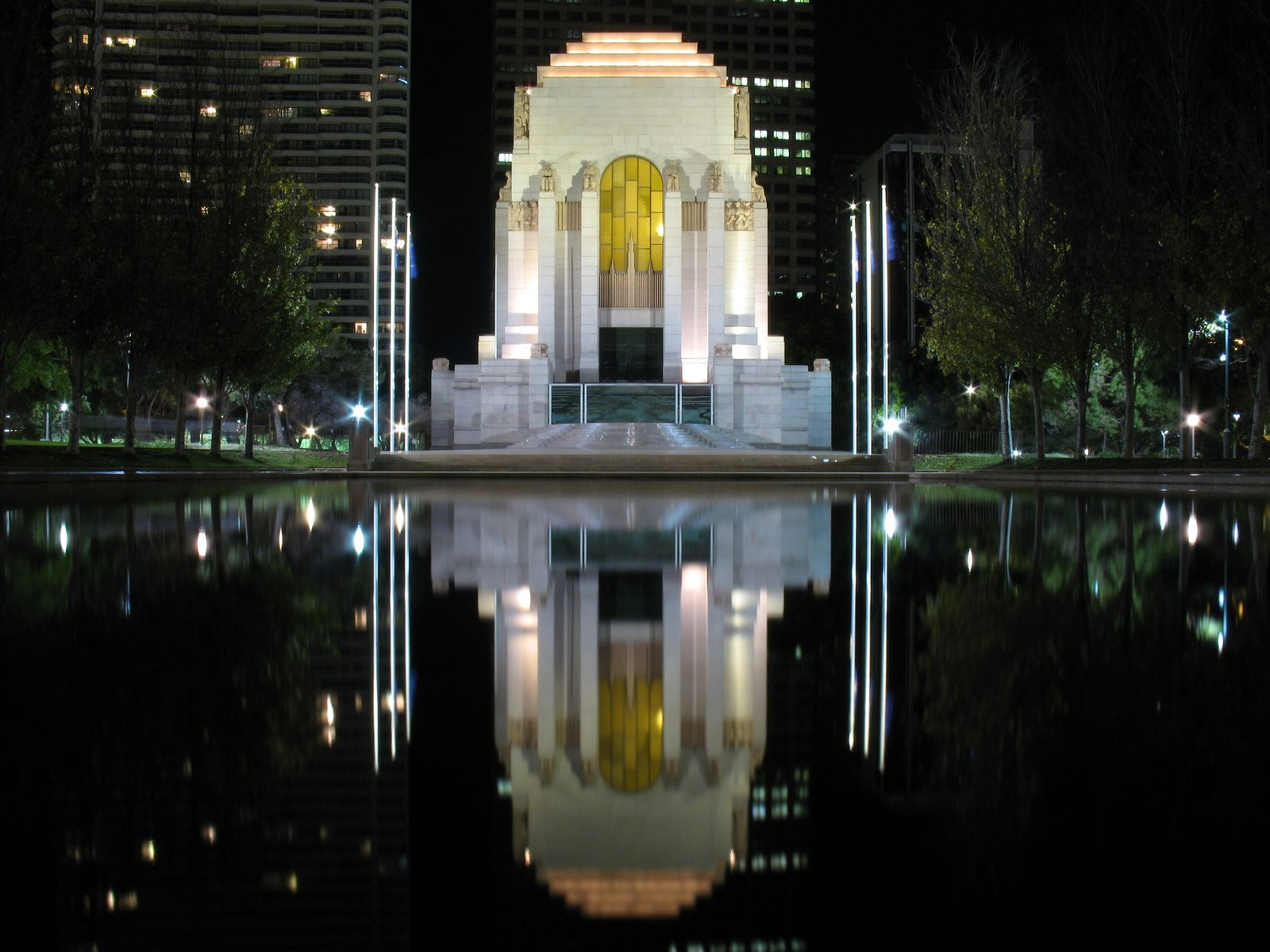
The ANZAC Memorial illuminated at night, 2007

A recent mark of respect to NSW service men and women was the 1995 addition of a Remembrance Flame to the Hall of Memory. The trustees made space for this new symbol by removing the door to the Archives Room and commissioning the Australian Gas Light Company Limited (AGL) to install the burner which is currently lit 8 hours a day between 9 am and 5 pm.

The ANZAC Memorial has been variously described as "a unique statement of architectural and sculptural unity", "the ultimate conception of the Art Deco style in this country" and "the epitome of Art Deco in Australia." It has become a site of increasing visitation in the 21st century, including a marked increase in the number of schools and other educational bodies. The ANZAC Memorial Building is "a lasting memorial", [an] "outstanding legacy" that continues to move present-day Australians to bow their heads 'in honoured memory of all those who have fought on the nation's behalf'.

=== Centenary Extension ===
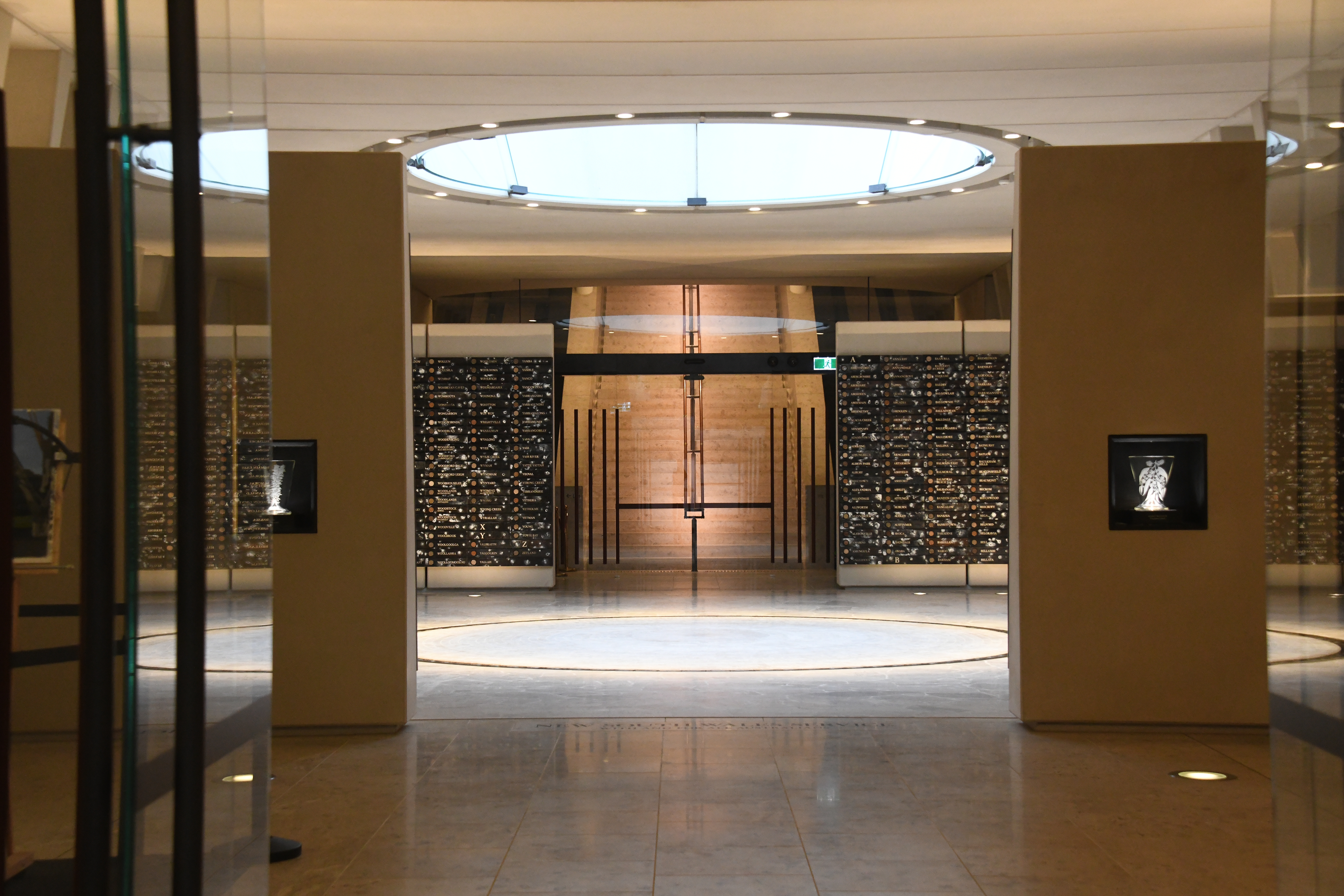
The Hall of Service

On 22 August 2016, work commenced on the $40 million enhancement of the Anzac Memorial. The extension was the "centrepiece of the State's Centenary of Anzac commemorations, marking the 100th anniversary of the ending of the First World War".

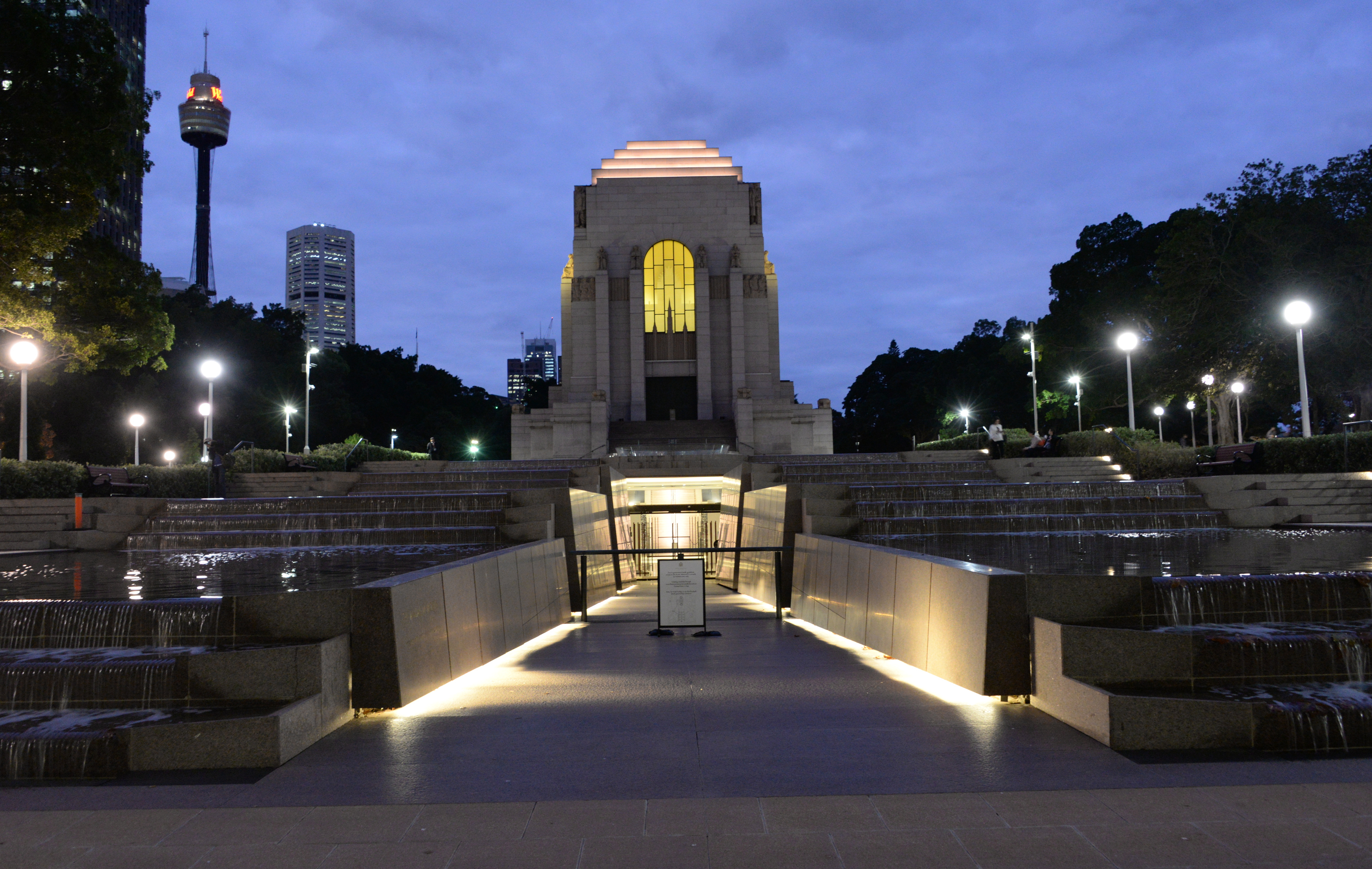
View of the waterfall extension and oculus.

The major extension realised architect Bruce Dellit's original concept for the Memorial and added new underground exhibition and education spaces. Premier Mike Baird said "by enhancing this memorial we are ensuring future generations can continue to honour those who fought for the freedoms we enjoy today". Construction was completed by Built and jointly funded by the NSW and Australian Governments.

The upgrades included:

- A large water cascade feature on the southern side of the memorial, with new entrance and walkway.
- The Hall of Service: including "a major artwork by Fiona Hall featuring 1,701 soil samples from each NSW town, suburb and district given as the home address by First World War enlistees".
- The Oculus, which is centred above the Hall of Service with a view out to the Memorial exterior.

The extension was designed by architects Johnson Pilton Walker and officially opened on 20 October 2018.

In June 2020 the Centenary Extension was awarded the Sir John Sulman Medal, the highest award for public architecture in New South Wales. Later that year in November 2020 the project was also awarded the Sir Zelman Cowen Award for Public Architecture by the Australian Institute of Architects at the national awards.

== Description ==
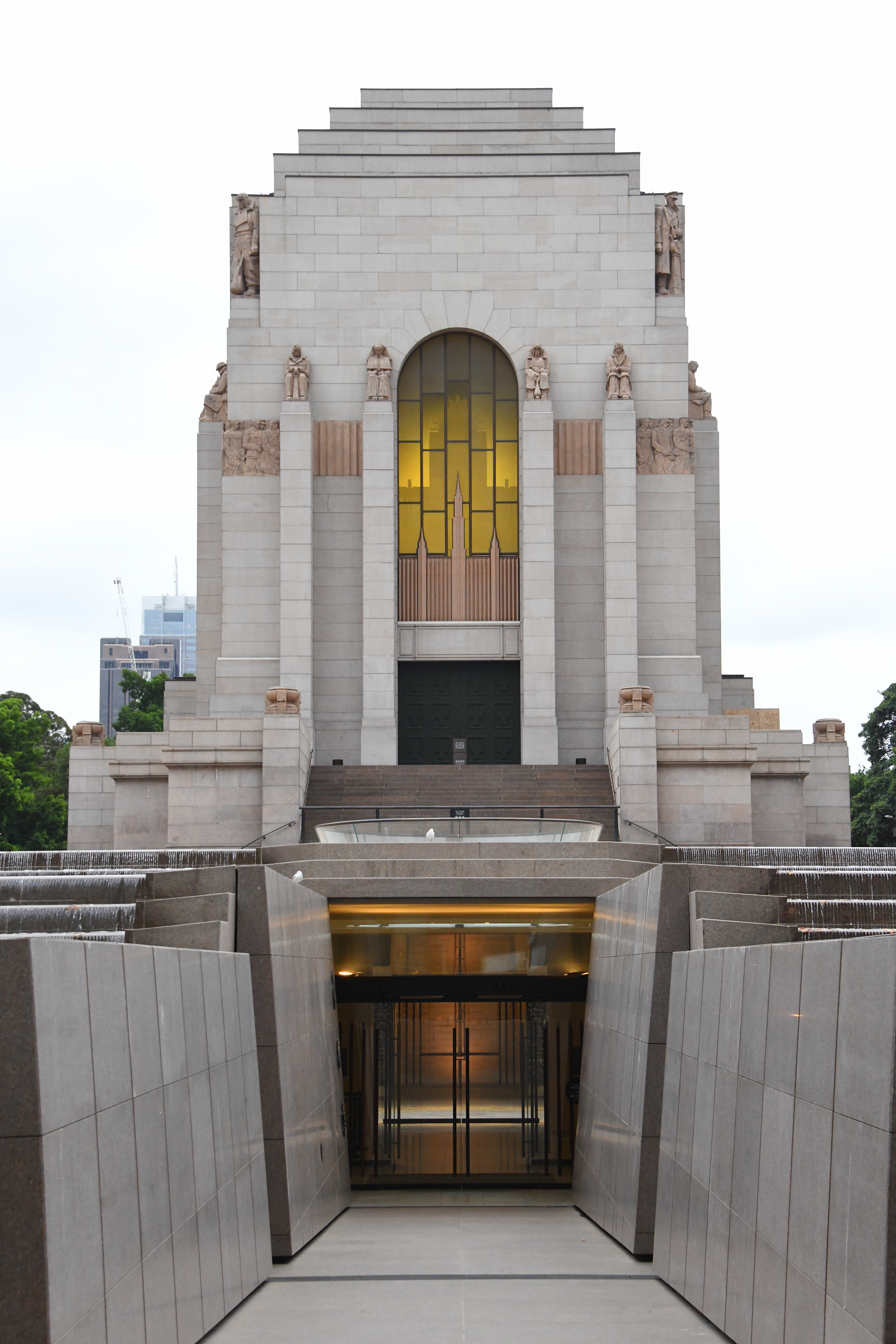
The Art Deco exterior of the building

The building is constructed of concrete, with an exterior cladding of pink granite, and consists of a massed square superstructure with typically Art Deco setbacks and buttresses, punctuated on each side by a large arched window of yellow stained glass, and crowned with a ziggurat-inspired stepped roof. It is positioned atop a cruciform pedestal within which are located administrative offices and a small museum. The interior is largely faced in white marble, and features a domed ceiling adorned with 120,000 gold stars – one for each of those men and women from New South Wales who served during World War I. Access to the main hall is provided via broad stairways on each side of the building's north–south axis, while ground-level doorways on the east and west sides offer entry to the lower section. The main focus of the interior is Rayner Hoff's monumental bronze sculpture of a deceased youth, representing a soldier, held aloft on his shield by a caryatid – three female figures, representing his mother, sister and wife. The male figure's nudity was considered shocking at the time of the monument's opening, and it is said to be the only such representation of a naked male form within any war memorial. Two other even more controversial figural sculptures designed by Hoff—one featuring a naked female figure—were never installed on the eastern and western faces of the structure as intended, partly as a result of opposition from high ranking representatives of the Catholic Church. The building's exterior is adorned with several bronze friezes, carved granite relief panels and twenty monumental stone figural sculptures symbolising military personnel, also by Hoff. Immediately to the north of the ANZAC Memorial is a large rectangular "Lake of Reflections" flanked by rows of poplars. The poplars, not native to Australia, symbolise the areas of France in which Australian troops fought. Original plans called for the construction of similar pools on each of the other sides of the building, but these were never built.

The memorial setting

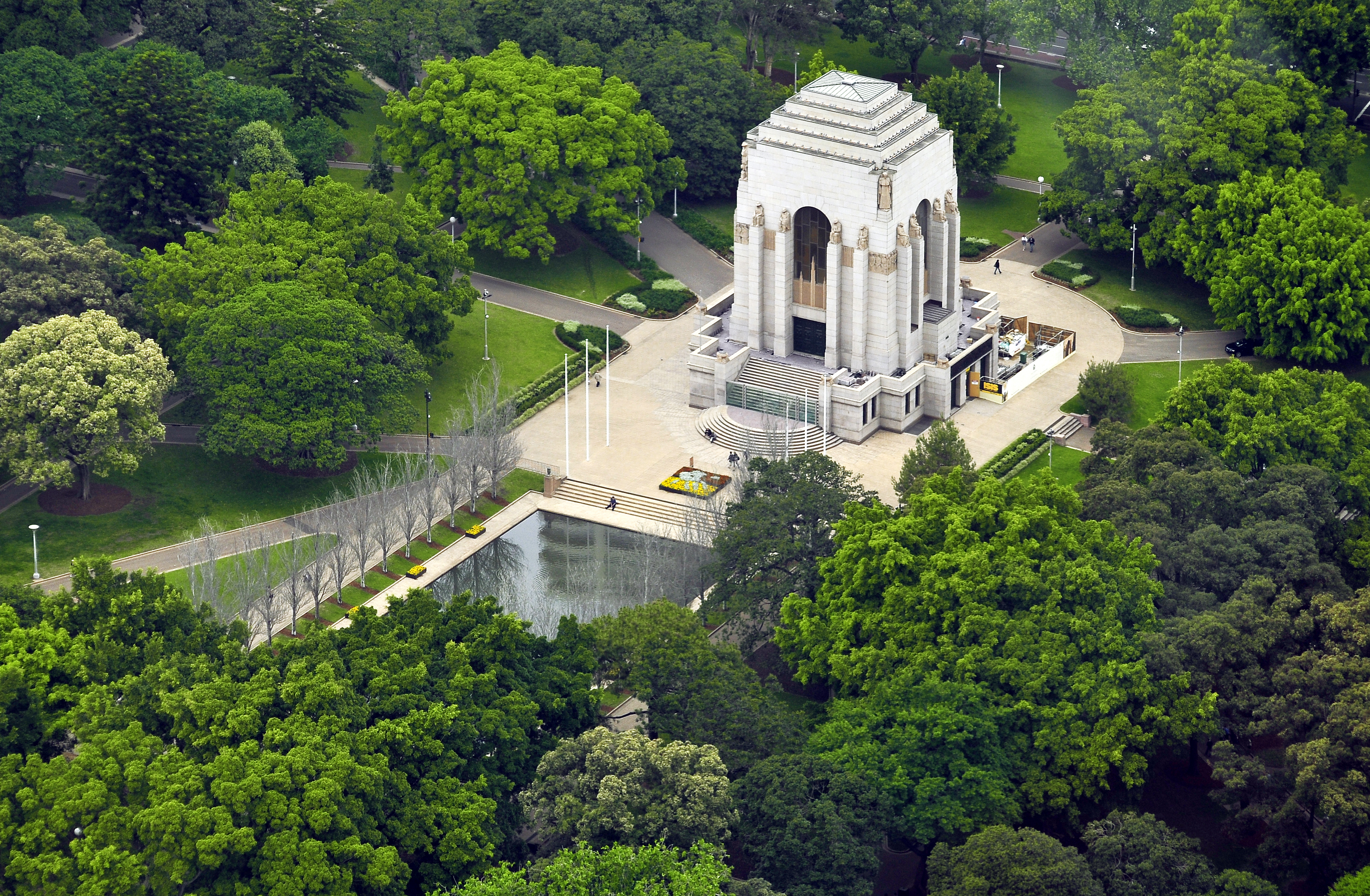
The memorial and surrounds

The ANZAC Memorial is located in Hyde Park South and is a principal physical focal point in the axis joining it and the Pool of Reflection with the Archibald Fountain in Hyde Park north. There are many prominent views of the memorial through Hyde Park South and the main axis is aligned with an avenue of fig trees, which accentuates the main path. The ziggurat form of ANZAC Memorial is also evident from Oxford Street for several blocks east of Whitlam Square.

The plantings around the ANZAC Memorial have strong associations with the building. The Allepo pine trees arranged around the building have significance because of their symbolic connection to Lone Pine Ridge in Anzac Cove in Turkey. Other symbolic trees have been brought as seedlings and planted in Hyde Park near the memorial, including Gallipoli Rose. The 14 poplars planted in two rows on either side of the Pool of Remembrance were planted in 1934, the date the pool was completed.

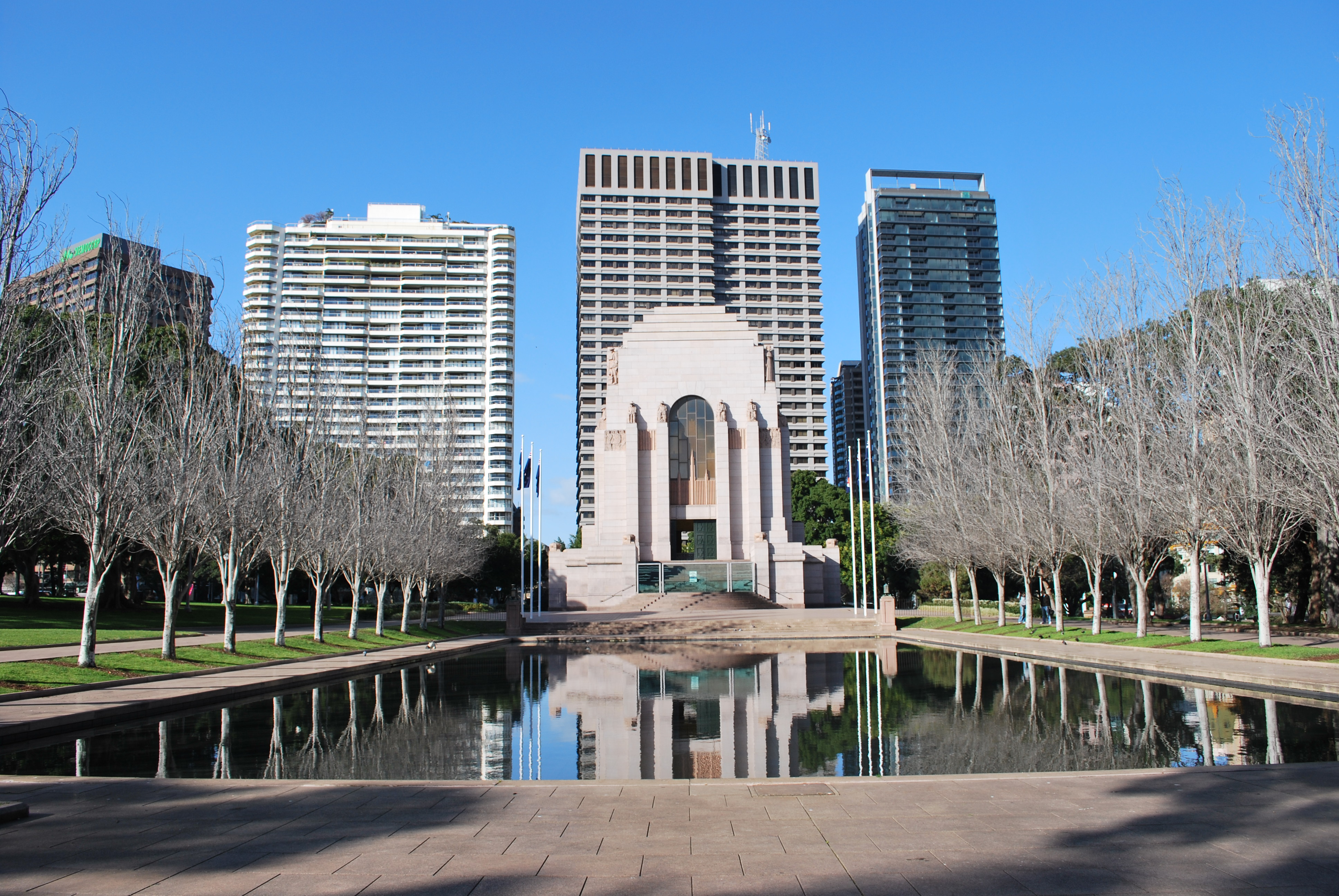
The Pool of Reflection

The pool underwent renovations in 1992 when a waterproof membrane was installed. This work was co-ordinated with paving around the memorial and the installation of a waterproofing membrane to the steps and podium level of the building.

Aligned between the Pool of Reflection and the memorial building staircase are two rows of flag poles that are used on ANZAC Day and commemorative occasions as part of the formal ceremonies at the memorial. Flags are flown permanently throughout the year. The three on the eastern side display the NSW flag and the three on the western side display the Australian national flag. The flagpole on the podium level of the memorial building is for the Governor's Flag and is only used when the Governor formally visits the site.

The external building

The ANZAC Memorial was designed as a sculptural monument. The building is symmetrical on both axes. It uses elements reminiscent of traditional gothic church buildings (buttresses, tall windows, high ceilings), but interprets them in an Art Deco style. Grand staircases lead to the podium level and extend symmetrically on the north and south sides of the building on the main axis of Hyde Park. The balustrade around the exterior of the podium level is surmounted with cast stone urns. Large timber moulded doors slide into cavities in the external walls to allow entry. The ground floor provides the visual base of the building form and is fenestrated with timber framed double hung windows and bronze security grilles. A string course of granite extends around the building and becomes the sill at windows.

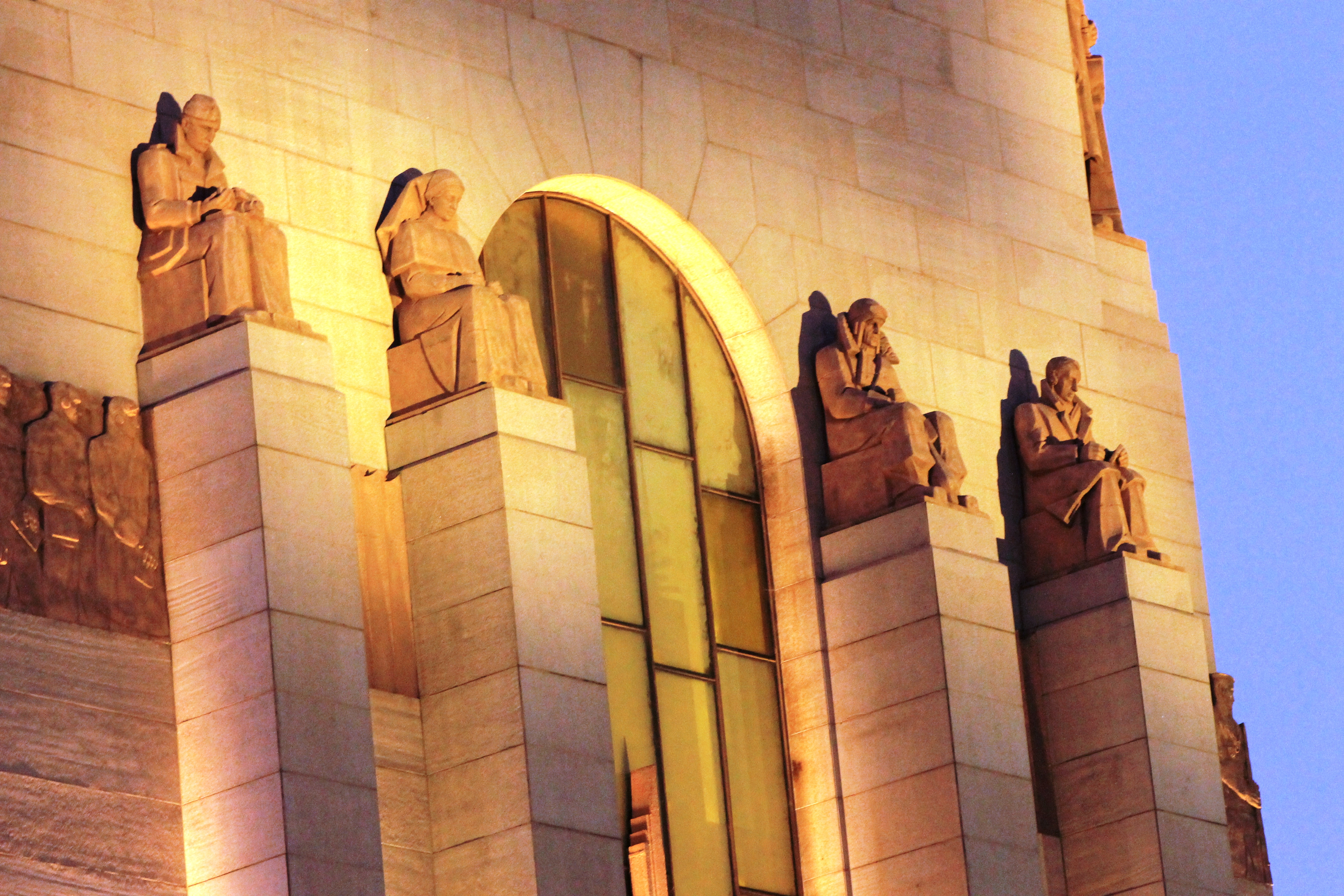
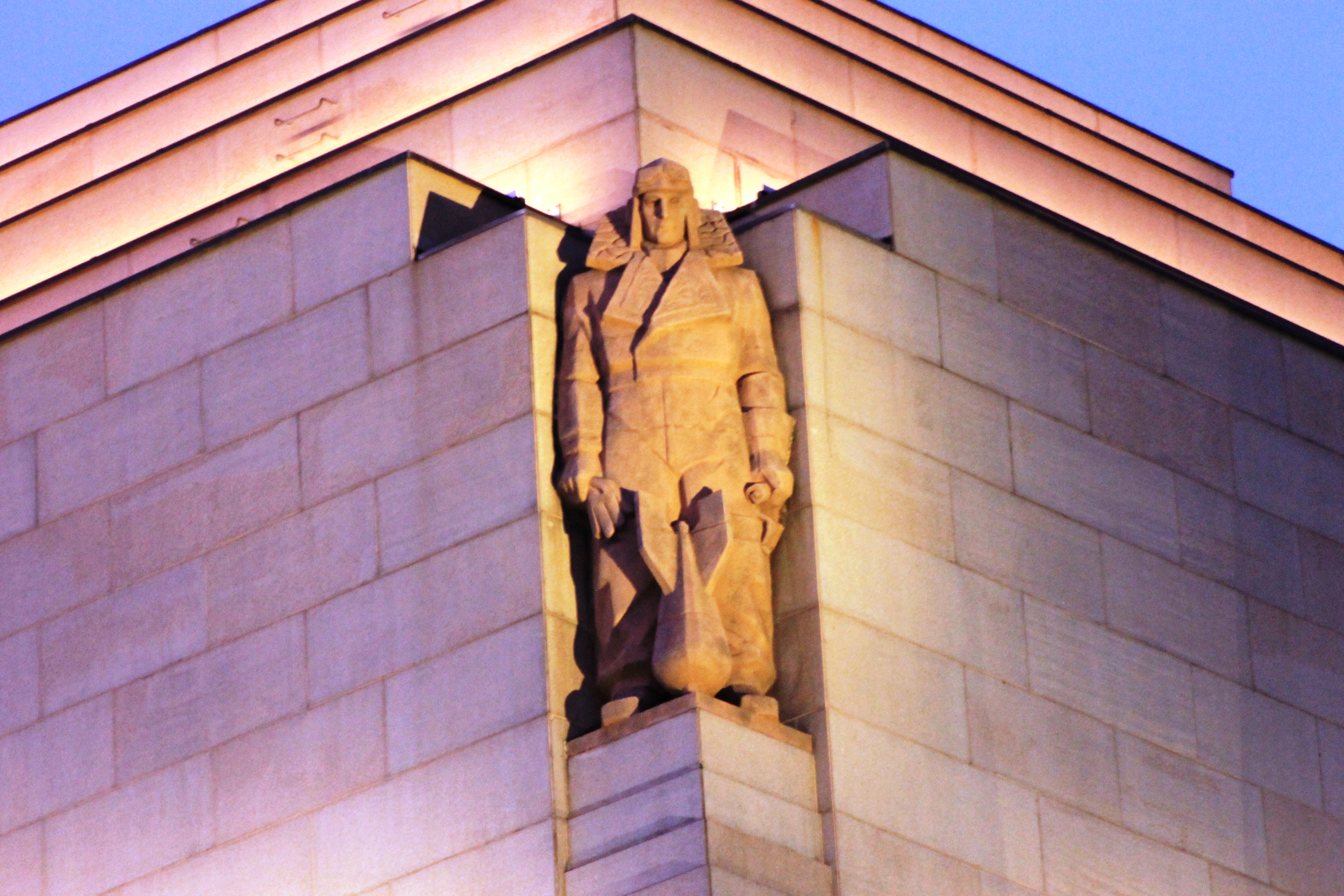
"Sentinel" figures adorning the exterior

The memorial is adorned externally with many sculptures representing the various Australian armed forces and support units. They are the sentinels of the building, keeping watch whilst representing the fallen for whom the building is dedicated. Between the seated figures in each corner are cast stone bas reliefs. The four large standing figures at the top of each corner of the building represent the Australian Infantry, Navy, Air Force and Army Medical Corps. Another 16 seated figures are positioned at the top of the buttresses, below the corner figures, and represent the various units. These statues include a Naval Signaller, Aviator, Nurse and Lewis Gunner fabricated from cast stone to resemble the granite facing of the building "so they should have the effect of having been hewn out of the moment rather than placed thereon". Above the Eastern and Western Entrances, bronze bas reliefs depict scenes of Australians in the Eastern and Western Fronts. The bronze bas reliefs are generally in good condition, however they require cleaning and the repair of some minor corrosion.

A dark pink granosite (synthetic coating) applied to the external statues in the mid 1980s does not reinterpret the architect's original design intention of the statues being hewn from the stone.

The internal building

The memorial's main entrance from ground level is from the Western side. The vestibule area is lined in Ulum white marble. Two timber cabinets of silky oak with obscured glass are recessed into opposite walls. In the centre of the ceiling is a large brass "Star" light, designed by Dellit.

This vestibule has glazed doors leading to the association and management offices to the north, exhibition area to the south, and opens to the west to the stair hall and the Hall of Silence. Originally, internal access between the upper and lower levels of the building was via two "mirror imaged" stairwells, which extended from the Stair Hall in the Vestibule to the Hall of Memory and down to the basement. One of these stairwells has been converted into a new lift, constructed in 2009, linking all three levels. This controlled lift was installed to provide equitable access to the Hall of Memory for ageing veterans and people with a disability. In the remaining stairwell is a bronze, Art Deco-styled skylight with amber glass. That has been converted to a light. Both stairwells are lined in marble with marble treads. A bronze handrail was fixed to each of the stair walls in 1997, designed by Louis Berczi, in a style to match the external copper handrails designed by Dellit.

At the edge of the Stair Hall is a barred entrance to the Hall of Silence. A large bronze moulded banister, too heavy to move, prevents access to the "tomb" of the fallen soldier, in the "Hall of Silence". At the foot of the entrance, engraved in black granite, with inset brass lettering are the words "LET SILENT CONTEMPLATION BE YOUR OFFERING".

At the top of the stairwell is a plaster niche framed with marble. The niche displays the original wreath laid by the trustees at the building opening. The wreath is kept in a glass display case and was restored in late 2009.

Hall of Silence

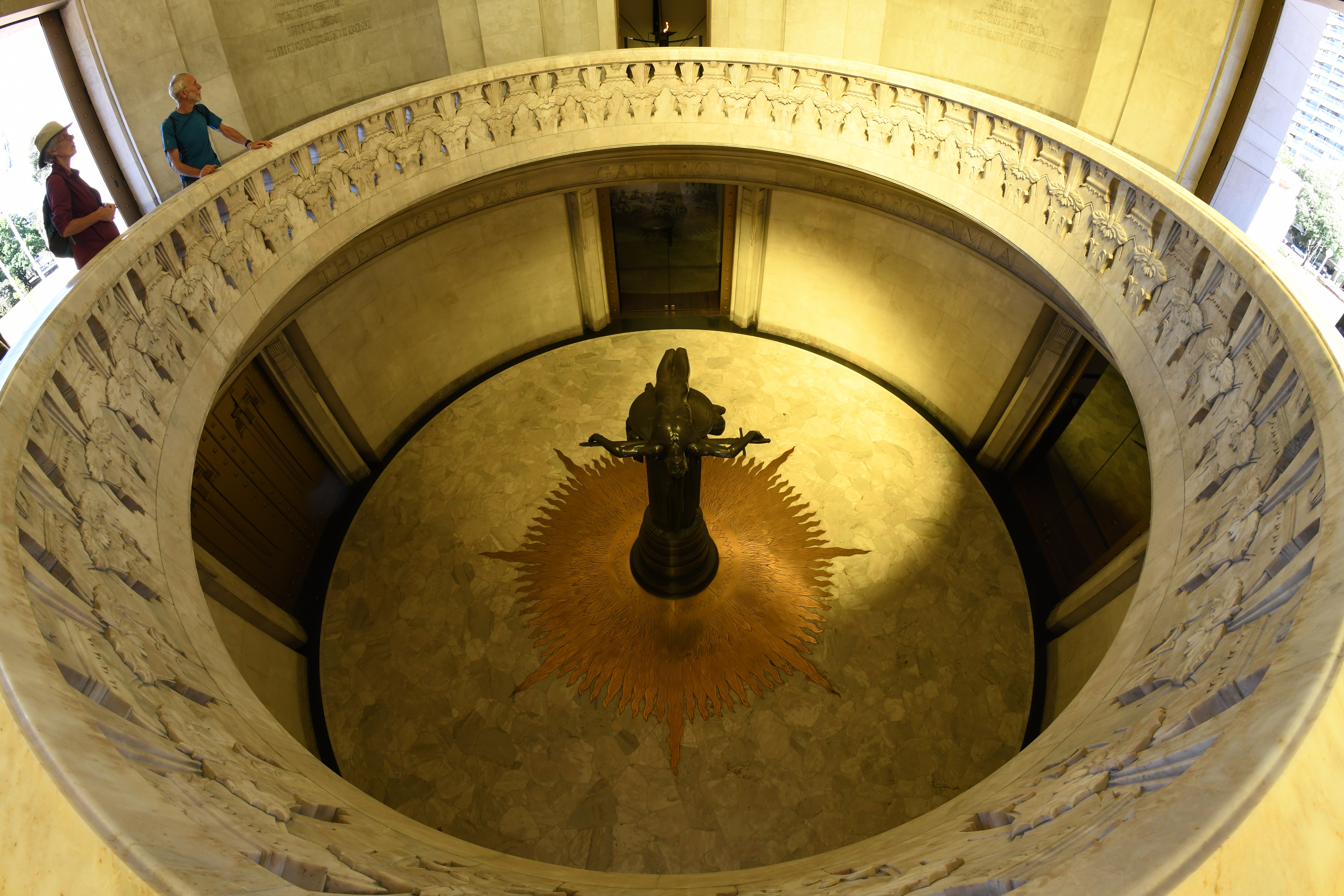
The Hall of Silence

The room located in the centre of the building is striking in its starkness and wields a powerful influence on visitors. The room is circular in plan with the sculpture "Sacrifice" located at its centre, as if to hold the sculpture in its embrace. The floor is Ulum white marble, inlayed with a bronze flame that flares out from the centrally located sculpture. The ceiling of the room curves up toward the carved marble banister that defines the "Well of Contemplation", a large circular opening in the centre of the shallow domed ceiling. This opening provides the only natural lighting to the "Hall of Silence" and has the effect of focussing that light onto the central sculpture. The cornice is a marble frieze in which is carved the names of the great battles where Australian forces participated in the war. According to Dellit, the names 'complete the message which the group of sculpture symbolising "Sacrifice" is intended to deliver'.

Located on the north–south and east–west axes, the room has three large silky oak double doors, gold painted, that slide open into wall cavities. Two of the doors are now permanently left open and glass doors installed in front of the reveals to allow visitors a view of the sculpture "Sacrifice" from inside the Exhibition space and the Assembly Hall.

Sacrifice

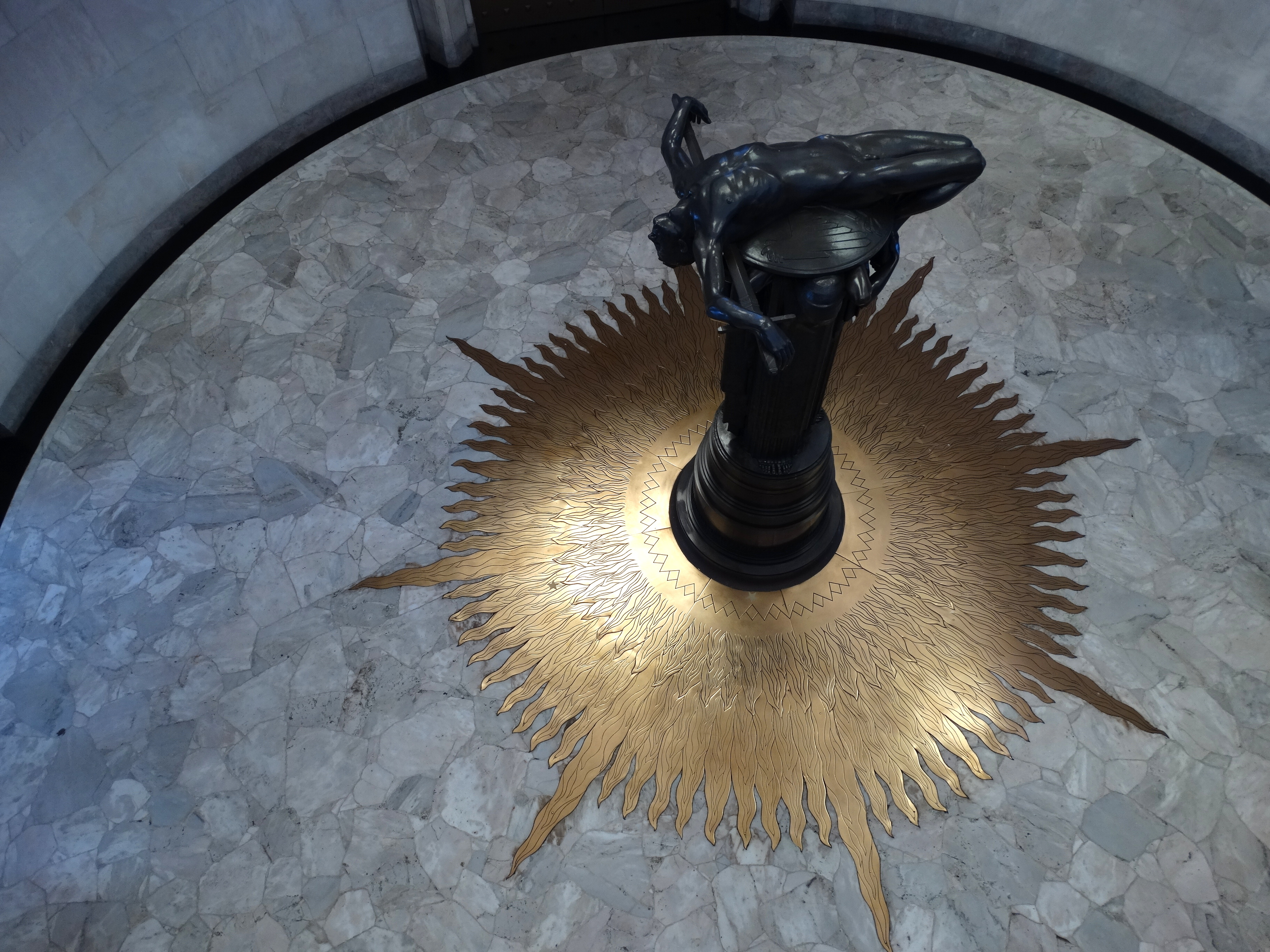
Rayner Hoff's "Sacrifice" sculpture

At the heart of the memorial is the bronze sculpture, "Sacrifice", by Rayner Hoff. It powerfully symbolises the sacrifice made in times of war by both those who go to fight and those left behind. The sculpture can be seen from above through the Well of Contemplation, with heads bowed, or at ground level from the vestibule, Assembly Hall and Exhibition space. The sculpture is also visible from Hyde Park, as originally proposed by Dellit, with glazed eastern doors to the Assembly Hall.

Hall of Memory

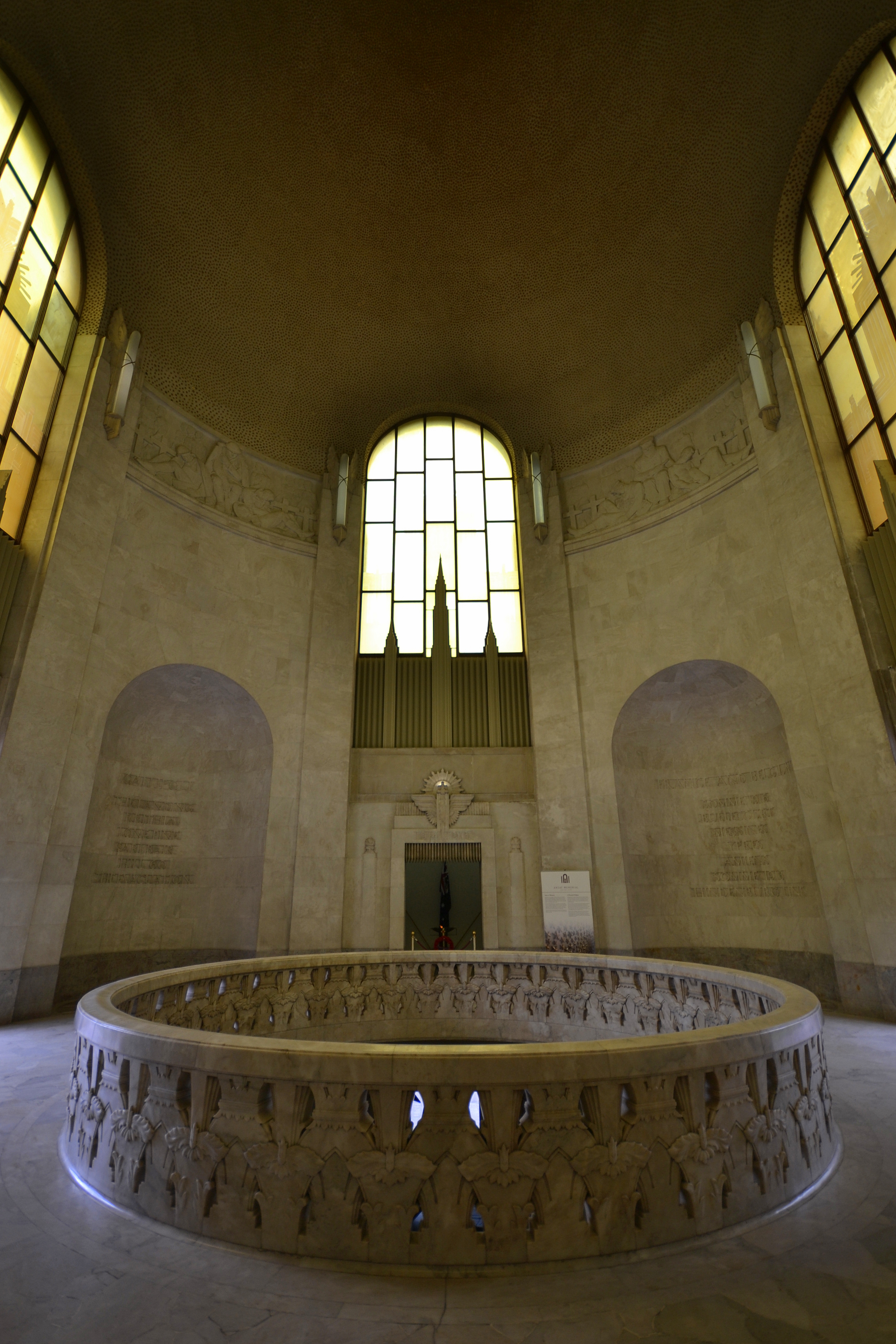
The Hall of Memory

The "Hall of Memory" is also a circular room that occupies the podium level of the building centred on and located directly above the "Hall of Silence". The large external staircases that lead to the external timber sliding double doors on the podium level on the northern and southern sides were intended to form the grand entrances to the memorial. The "Hall of Memory" is clad in Ulum marble. In the centre of the room, carved in the form of a wreath is the marble balustrade around the "Well of Contemplation".

Located in the four "corners" of the room are semi-circular "Niches of Remembrance", each devoted to one of the major theatres of World War I in which Australians fought, and each commemorating the names of major campaigns in those theatres. The name of the theatre is carved in relief into the face of the marble wall at the top of each niche with the names of the battles beneath it, another example of the fusion of sculpture and building. At the base of each niche, laid in the paving is a headstone from Flanders, Gallipoli, Palestine and New Guinea.

Above the tall niches are marble cast bas reliefs by Rayner Hoff that represent the Army, Navy, Air Force and Army Medical Corps and therefore correspond to the four large standing external sculptures. Hoff called them "The March of the Dead". Each relief is bracketed by winged finial lights. Above all this is the high soaring dome of the ceiling covered with 120,000 stars, one for every man and woman in NSW who served in the Great War, made of plaster of paris and painted gold leaf. The height of the room is accentuated with the four grand cathedral windows of etched amber glass, designed by Dellit with Hoff.

To the west of Hall of Memory are the internal stairs from the ground floor vestibule. To the east is the Remembrance Flame Room, originally the Archives Room and intended to list the names of those 21,000 NSW men and women who died serving their county in the Great War. The room's entrance is accentuated with pilasters and carvings. Over the doorway is carved "1914–1918" and above that is a winged flaming sword (a symbol of sacrifice) over a rising sun emblem. The room holds the Remembrance Flame that was first officially lit on 11 November 1995. The Great Doors to the room are left open to keep the flame exposed to view at all times. A braided rope hangs across the entrance to prevent visitors from entering.

The exhibition space

The exhibition space occupies the southern office area originally provided for the RSL. In 1986, changes to the existing room layout were made, including removal of a number of small offices. The original Strong Room with its Chubb security door is still intact. The items displayed in the museum collection were donated by the public and they include personal letters, medals, books, diaries, uniforms, souvenirs, relics and banners relating to the various conflicts in which Australians were involved. In 2000 an Abloy anti-theft proof locking system was installed in the exhibition cases. To commemorate the 75th anniversary of the Memorial in 2009, the space was refurbished (for example the original marquetry counter was reused as the visitor's counter) and a new exhibition was installed.

The Assembly Hall

Located opposite the entry vestibule on the eastern side of the memorial, the Assembly Hall was originally designed as a large open space used for meetings and forums by the different building occupants. In recent years it had been partitioned to allow for a smaller meeting space, office accommodation and archive storage at the northern end. It has been restored and reopened to the public, with new glazed doors to the east and west and a large freestanding AV unit, screening a short film about the Memorial. The room can also be used as a travelling exhibition space.

The original plans for the room proposed a raised dais on the southern endwith protruding stage and steps but this was never built. The original dais area was fitted as a kitchen for the memorial staff. This was subsequently removed in 2009, providing a linking space between the exhibition and the Assembly Hall.

The design of the room is more ornate than the general office space. The Art Deco detailing extends to the fittings and fixtures in the room. The ceiling is moulded with large Art Deco coffers and the walls are punctuated with plaster pilasters. A set of gold painted great doors opens back to reveal the sculpture "Sacrifice". This room has marble door architraves and "star lights" designed by Dellit. The original flange wall lights are still in use and many of the original switches still exist in the room. The floors of the Assembly Hall are two-inch hardwood seasoned Red Mahogany.

The bearers are built directly onto the concrete slab. The flooring structure suggests that the original intent may have been to install parquetry flooring throughout the hall. These floor boards were lifted, patched, repaired and relaid as part of building works during 2009.

Offices for the TB Soldiers and Limbless Soldiers Association The northern side of the ANZAC Memorial was originally designated for offices for the TB Soldiers Association and for the Limbless Soldiers Association with parquetry floors, marquetry counters and maple panelled timber partitions. The association's rooms are accessed by the public from the front vestibule via a tiled corridor with maple-framed clerestory windows glazed with obscured glass. The offices as built did not follow the original plan. The original partitions in the TB Soldiers Association were removed in 1986 and substituted with aluminium-framed timber panel and glass partitions. These were subsequently replaced in 2009 with stud-framed plasterboard walls in a new configuration.

The Limbless Soldiers offices changed only slightly from the original layout. The marquetry counter ran across the room and the entrance door was placed to the top of this room. The general activity room was also changed just slightly from the plan, the door is in the middle of the room and the wall curves slightly to make a concave shape in the corridor. Building works in 2009 included restoration of the remaining original offices, creation of a new meeting room/library, kitchenette and management offices. The timber panelled partitions in this area are still in good order but only some of the original furniture remains. The Limbless Soldiers Association moved out of their offices in 2004 and the area has been used by the RSL since that date.

The original Chubb Strong Rooms are still retained in both rooms (there are three strong rooms in all).

Basement

The basement of the ANZAC Memorial contains toilets for both men and women and the original timber lockers are still used by the memorial staff today. The basement has had some alterations within the original layout, however the toilet partitions and doors as well as many fixtures have not been altered and are in good order. Construction during 2009 included the insertion of a new disabled toilet (associated with the new lift), and a purpose-made cleaners room. Two light wells were originally created to provide fresh air and natural light for the toilets. These light wells now also contain the air conditioning plant, air intake and exhaust system for the building. A major stormwater pit (approximately 1m x 1m) is also located in the basement, in the central cleaner's store with a submersible pump, and is known as the Underground Plant Room. The stairs and flooring of the basement are terrazzo in good condition. The partitions in the male and female toilets are marble and the original timber doors and hardware are in good order. In addition to the existing original timber handrail, a new brass handrail was added in 1985 to match the style of the handrail in the stairwell to the "Hall of Memory".

Undercroft and vertical security screens

The undercrofts are located under the external stairs leading to the podium level of the memorial. Originally intended for storage spaces for the offices of the RSL and the TB and Limbless Associations, they were largely unusable until 1992 when a water proof membrane was installed over the external stairs to deal with the damp and water ingress issues. The north undercroft now stores the original unused furniture from the memorial.

To provide protection against increasing vandalism of the ANZAC Memorial, external security screens were installed in 1999. The panels of the screen are made of safety glass etched with designs that continue the original concept of the symbolic use of building elements to reinforce the memorial's purpose. When lowered (normally between 9am and 5pm) they are virtually invisible and allow unobstructed public access.

The great doors and windows

There are ten sets of great doors to the building, seven on the ground floor and three on the podium level. All the doors are double leaf sliding doors of solid silky oak timber with brass furniture. The sets of external doors are painted green externally and gold internally. The doors slide on tracks that are recessed in the masonry walls of the building. The sets of doors are all panelled and decorated with carvings of urns, eternals flames, swords and crosses all symbolic of the memorial. These doors were repaired and repainted in 2006.

Moveable heritage

There is an extensive collection of artefacts, items of memorabilia and tributes on display in the Museum space or stored in a number of small spaces on site, including one of the safes. These items have all been donated by members of the public.

Mechanical and electrical services

Construction works during 2009 upgraded the services in the building, including the air-conditioning with the installation of new suspended services spine for ductwork, lighting and security services through the exhibition area and offices.

Many of the original electrical fittings remain in use in the building. These include switches and lighting. The original star lights, designed by Dellit and inspired by the stars on the ceiling of the Hall of Memories, are still used throughout the building. The original wall bracket light fittings in the Assembly Hall are also still used.

=== Condition ===
As at 26 February 2010, following many years of major catch-up maintenance and repair works, the general condition of the Memorial in 2010 is very good. Water ingress has been a constant issue within the building since it opened in 1934. In 2009 this was resolved with modifications to the podium drainage and paving system.

==== Archaeology ====
The archaeological potential of the site has not been formally assessed. Hyde Park was the site of Australia's first race course and cricket pitch. Recent scholarship suggests Hyde Park north was also the site of a "fighting ground" for staging combative trials, first by the Aboriginal people between their own clans, later by Aboriginal people in demonstrating their fighting prowess against the British. Evidence associated with these uses as well as former park layouts may still exist within the park precinct, although it is likely to have been substantially disturbed by construction of the railway stations and tunnels as well as the memorial itself. The outlet to Busby's Bore is immediately to the east of the memorial within the broader site curtilage.

The Anzac Memorial is remarkably intact, and contains a great deal of original fabric. This includes moveable items such as the wreath laid by the Duke of Gloucester.

=== Wreath ===
The memorial contains a number of moveable heritage items including the wreath, rail designed by Bruce Dellit. Two larger plaster models of the building and possibly some furniture within the office spaces.

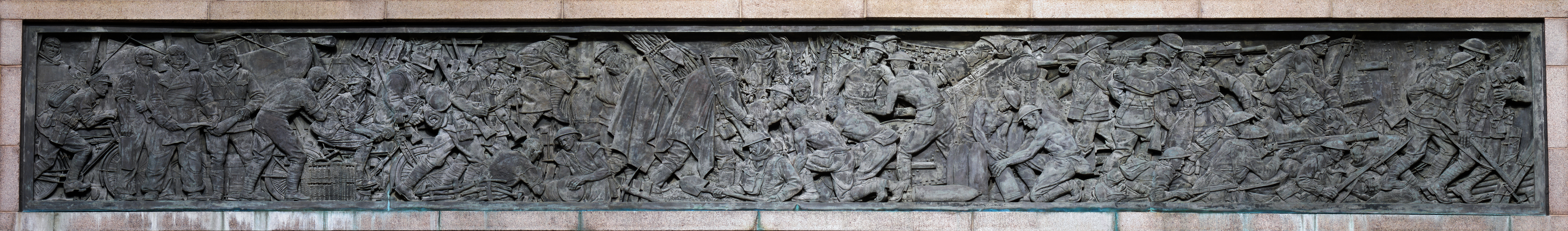
A ten-metre-long bronze relief, over the west door by Rayner Hoff.

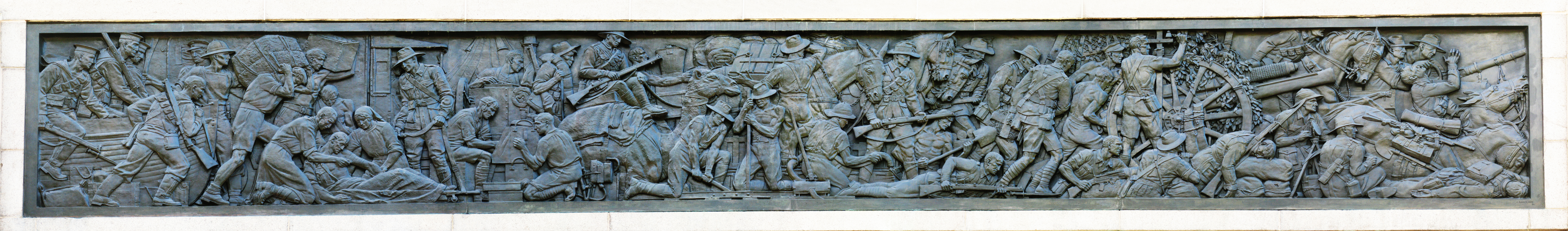
The other 10 m (32.8 ft) long bronze relief, over the east door. These two sculptures illustrate the functions and activities of elements of the Australian Imperial Force overseas.

== Heritage listing ==
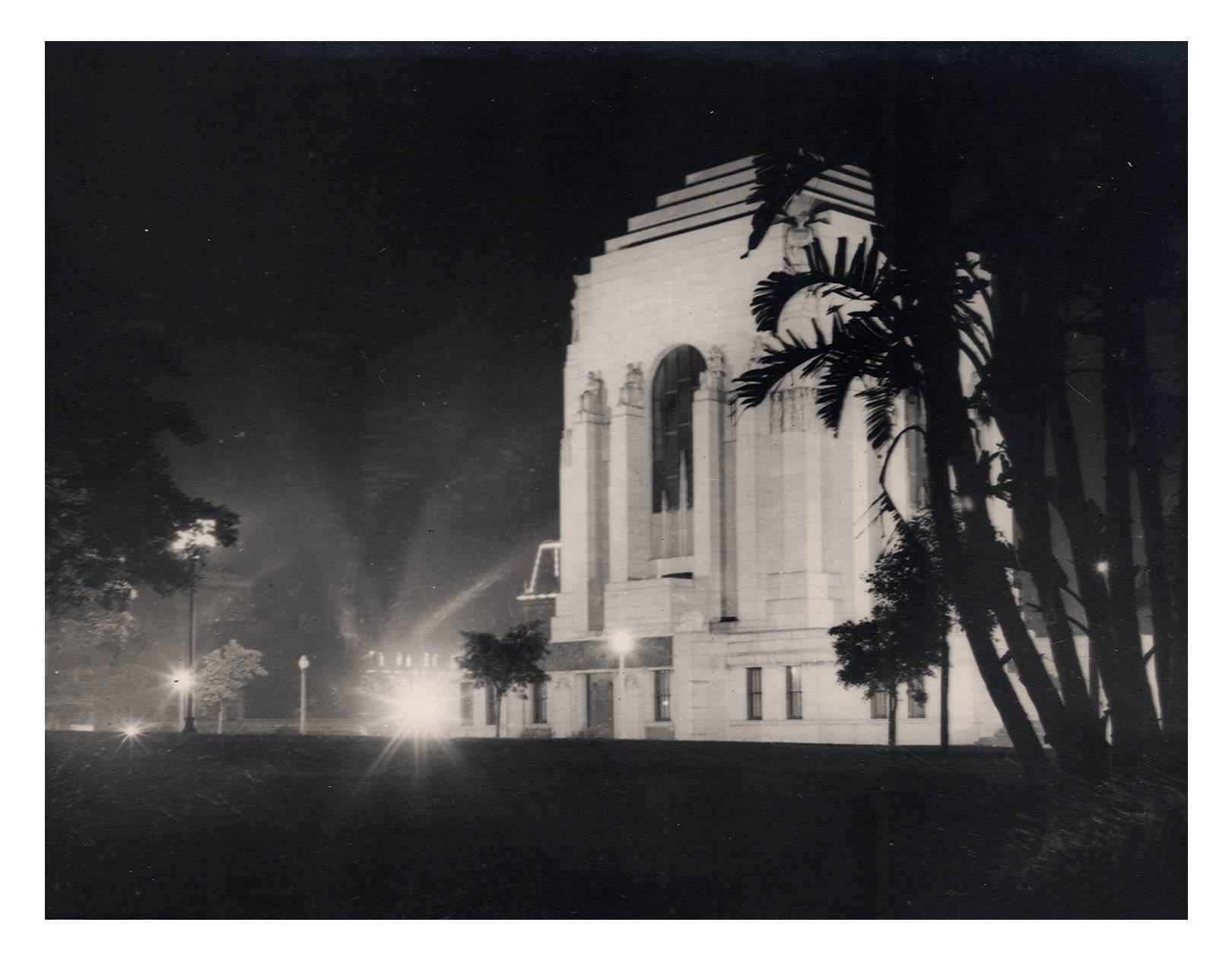
The Anzac War Memorial during the 1938 Sesquicentenary Celebrations

As at 19 September 2011, The ANZAC Memorial, completed in 1934, is of historical significance to the State for its embodiment of the collective grief of the people of NSW at the loss of Australian servicemen and women since World War I. It is associated with the landing of Australian troops at Gallipoli on 25 April 1915, since fundraising for the memorial was established on the first anniversary of the landing. It is also associated with returned servicemen and their organisations including the RSL, which lobbied for the erection of the monument and occupied offices within it. The ANZAC Memorial is of State aesthetic significance as a great work of public art which is arguably the finest expression of Art Deco monumentality in Australia. The result of an outstanding creative collaboration between architect Bruce Dellit and sculptor Rayner Hoff, it contains complex symbolic embellishments that reinforce and enhance the commemorative meanings of the building. Its landscape context in Hyde Park was purposefully designed for it by Dellit including the large Pool of Reflection lined by poplars. Its positioning on a major axis linked to the Archibald Fountain contributes significantly to the physical character of Hyde Park and the city of Sydney. The ANZAC Memorial is of State significance as the largest and most ambitious of the numerous war memorials constructed throughout NSW after the Great War. The memorial is also representative as NSW's contribution to the group of "national war memorials", whereby each state capital city developed its own major war memorial in the inter-war period. In this group the ANZAC Memorial is outstanding in its size, integrity and aesthetic appeal.

ANZAC War Memorial was listed on the New South Wales State Heritage Register on 23 April 2010 having satisfied the following criteria.

The place is important in demonstrating the course, or pattern, of cultural or natural history in New South Wales.

The ANZAC Memorial in Hyde Park is of historical significance to the State as an embodiment of the collective grief felt by the people of New South Wales at the loss of Australian servicemen at Gallipoli and other conflicts since then. Authorised by NSW legislation in 1923, it is of State significance as a major place of commemoration and for its associations with the celebration of Anzac Day since 1941. The ANZAC Memorial is also of historical significance because its construction provided much needed employment for returned veterans during the Great Depression. The Lake of Reflection was constructed through the Unemployment Relief Fund established by the State government.

The place has a strong or special association with a person, or group of persons, of importance of cultural or natural history of New South Wales's history.

The ANZAC Memorial is of State significance for its association with the landing of Australian troops at Gallipoli on 15 April 1915. The landing at Gallipoli was a significant event in Australian history, having an enormous impact on the Australian psyche and the formation of the Australian character and fundraising for the memorial was established on the first anniversary of the landing. This association is strengthened by the presence of an Aleppo Pine in the western ground of the memorial, taken from the Lone Pine at Lone Pine Gap in Gallipoli. The ANZAC Memorial is also of State significance for its association with returned servicemen and their organisations including the RSL, Limbless and Maimed Soldier's Association and the T.B. Sailors and Soldier's Association of Australia. These groups both lobbied for the erection of the monument and have occupied offices within it. The ANZAC Memorial is also of State significance as for its associations with its architect Bruce Dellit and its sculptor Rayner Hoff, both of whom are famous largely because of their design work in creating the memorial, which is arguably the finest Art Deco building in Australia. The memorial is associated with Anzac Day and the Anzac Day march on 25 April each year which starts at the Cenotaph and concludes near Hyde Park.

The place is important in demonstrating aesthetic characteristics and/or a high degree of creative or technical achievement in New South Wales.

The ANZAC Memorial is of State aesthetic significance as a great work of public art which is arguably the finest expression of Art Deco monumentality in Australia. It is the result of an outstanding creative collaboration between architect Bruce Dellit and sculptor Rayner Hoff and contains complex symbolic embellishments that reinforce and enhance the commemorative meanings of the building. Its relative lack of religious symbology provides evidence of the processes of secularisation in NSW during the inter war period. The memorial has been praised for its "unity of architecture, carving and sculpture" and for "achieving a remarkable dignity of expression". Rayner Hoff's sculpture has been described as "a masterpiece of craftsmanship... romantic without being sentimental, austere without being severe" (Sturgeon). The ANZAC Memorial is also of State significance for the landscape purposefully designed for it by Dellit including a large reflection pool lined by poplars. The building is a prominent element in Hyde Park where it shares a principal axis with another major memorial to World War I, the Archibald Fountain. Its position contributes significantly to the physical character of Hyde Park and the city of Sydney.

The place has a strong or special association with a particular community or cultural group in New South Wales for social, cultural or spiritual reasons.

The ANZAC Memorial is of State significance as a major focus for the public commemoration of Australians lost at war since its completion. Its construction is linked to acceptance of the term "Anzac" by the Australian people and the legend that is associated with the name. The memorial remains an integral part of Anzac Day commemorations each year. Its sculpture is likely to be of State social significance for its commemoration of the role of women in war, both as war workers and as mothers of soldiers, which was almost unheard of in the 1930s and remains unusual today. The Returned Soldiers Association of NSW wanted the memorial to be "A lasting memorial, some outstanding legacy that shall quicken the blood of future generations, and move them to bare their heads in honoured memory of those who won for Australia its place amongst the nations". The ANZAC Memorial provides an important place of communal commemoration.

The place possesses uncommon, rare or endangered aspects of the cultural or natural history of New South Wales.

The ANZAC Memorial is of State significance as a notable example of Art Deco public architecture.

The place is important in demonstrating the principal characteristics of a class of cultural or natural places/environments in New South Wales.

The ANZAC Memorial is of State significance as the largest and most ambitious of the numerous war memorials constructed throughout New South Wales after World War I and as a remarkable example of commemorative architecture and Art Deco design. The memorial is also representative as NSW's contribution to the group of "national war memorials", whereby each state capital city developed its own major war memorial in the inter-war period. In this group the ANZAC Memorial is outstanding in its size, integrity and aesthetic appeal.

== See also ==
- ANZAC Memorial (Israel)
- Australian War Memorial – Australia's national war memorial and museum in Canberra
- El Alamein Fountain
- HMAS Sydney I – SMS Emden Memorial
- Hobart Cenotaph – Hobart's main war memorial
- National War Memorial (South Australia) – Adelaide's main war memorial
- Regimental Square
- Shrine of Remembrance – Melbourne's main war memorial
- Shrine of Remembrance, Brisbane – Brisbane's main war memorial
- Sydney Cenotaph
