= Bruce Dellit =

Australian architect

Charles Bruce Dellit
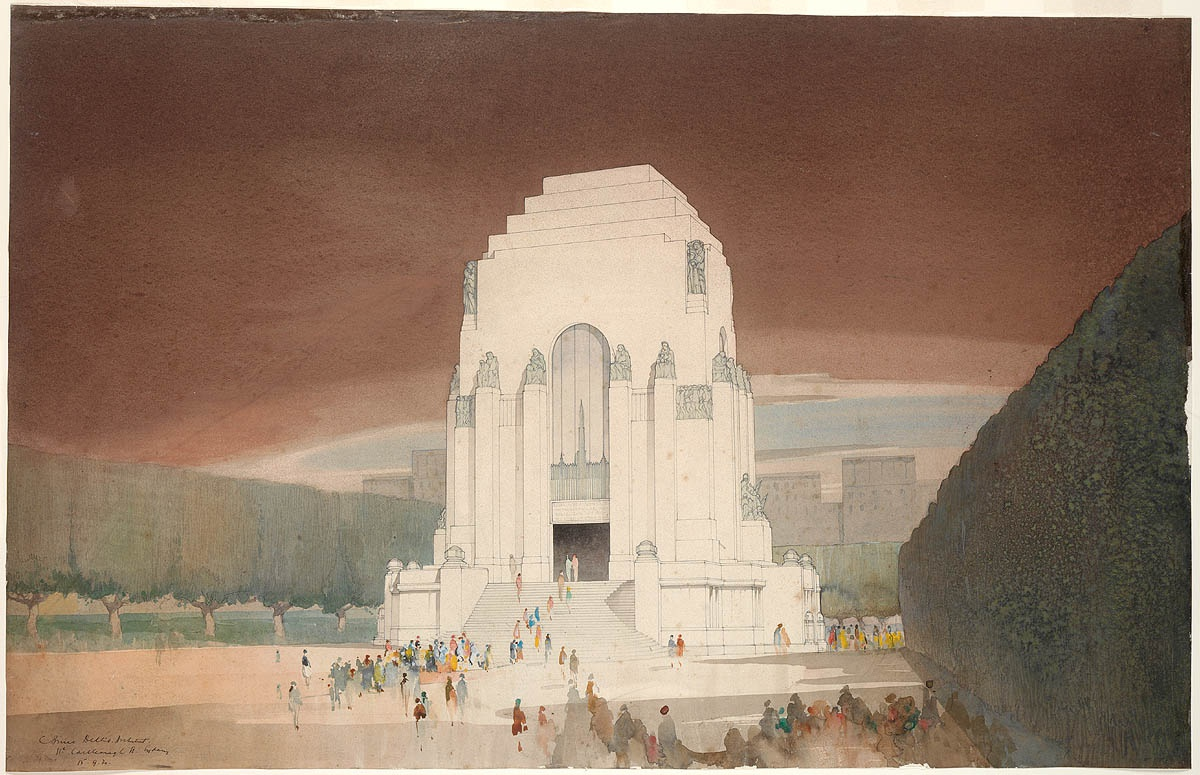
- Anzac War Memorial, Hyde Park, Sydney
- Born: 7 November 1898; Darlington, New South Wales
- Died: 21 August 1942 (aged 43); Hornsby, New South Wales
- Other names: Bruce Dellit
- Education: Christian Brothers' College, Waverley; Sydney Technical College
- Occupation: Architect
- Known for: Architecture

Charles Bruce Dellit (7 November 1898 – 21 August 1942) was an Australian architect who pioneered the Art Deco style in Australia. He was generally known as Bruce Dellit.

He is known for having designed the Anzac War Memorial in Hyde Park, Sydney.

== Early life and education ==
Dellit was born on 7 November 1898 in Darlington, Sydney Australia. He was the son of Albert Dellit, a furniture manufacturer and Agnes Gertrude Mack. His full siblings were Albert Cormack, Leo Harold and Ena May. As a child, he attended Christian Brothers' College, Waverley.

After leaving school, Dellit gained employment with the architect John L. Berry and at 16 he enrolled at the Sydney Technical College. From 1919, Dellit studied architecture under Professor Leslie Wilkinson at the University of Sydney for one day a week.

== Career ==
From 1918 Dellit worked for architects Hall & Prentice in Queensland and, after returning to Sydney, joined Spain & Cosh in 1922. He set up his own practice in 1928.

Dellit is most noted for his design of the art deco Anzac Memorial in Hyde Park, Sydney, built to commemorate the ANZACs who fought in the First World War. Dellit won the project in a design competition that attracted over 100 entries. He introduced the new fashion for Art Deco (more familiar for entertainment buildings) devoid of any classical details and adding a stepped roof. Dellit engaged the sculptor, Rayner Hoff, to create the statues and bas-reliefs for the monument.

Dellit continued to complete several commercial and residential buildings during the 1930s.

== Notable works ==
=== Kyle House ===
After beginning his private practice in 1928, Dellit's first major project was Kyle House in Macquarie Place, Sydney. The building, notable for its strong vertical lines and dominating ground floor arch, is considered among the earliest examples of Sydney commercial architecture embracing the Inter-War Art Deco style.

=== Kinselas Funeral Chapel ===
Built in 1910 at the present location of Taylor Square Darlinghurst. The original building was converted into an Art Deco style by Dellit after being purchased by funeral director Charles Kinsela in 1932. The building, which is now used as a bar, contains the work of Rayner Hoff and is considered among the best examples of Art Deco "funerary spaces" in Sydney.

=== Liberty cinema ===
In 1934 Dellit rebuilt the old Rialto theatre at 232 Pitt Street, close to the Lyceum. Constructed of reinforced concrete in art nouveau style, its foyer featured bas-relief panels by Rayner Hoff, as well as a bust of William Charles Wentworth. It was rebuilt in the 1970s as the three-screen Greater Union Pitt Centre.

=== Anzac Memorial ===
Dellit's Anzac Memorial, within Hyde Park, Sydney, is considered to be the "epitome" of pairing of the symmetrical classicism of the Moderne style architecture with Art Deco, decorative embellishments. Dellit's "masterpiece", completed in 1934, is complemented by Rayner Hoff's Art Deco sculptures and reliefs depicting the men of the First Australian Imperial Force.

== Personal life ==
Dellit married Victoria Clara Millar on 15 October 1921 in Queensland. Children of the marriage were Portia, Albert Victor (known as Victor) and Deirdre. Victor was also a prominent architect.

Dellit died from cancer, aged 43, in Hornsby near Sydney, NSW.
