= List of Art Deco buildings in Perth =

This page is a list of historically significant Art Deco and Moderne buildings in the Perth, Western Australia metropolitan area.

== Commercial buildings ==
Name	Address	Date	Architect	Image
Art Deco Shop (Persian Carpet Gallery)	102 Stirling Highway, Nedlands	1938	W G Leighton	
Atlas Building	8-10 The Esplanade, Perth	1931	F. G. B. Hawkins	
Bank of NSW	899 Hay Street, Perth	1935		
Clock Tower Building & Moon Cafe	323 William Street, Northbridge	1930		
De Feu & Co	38 Roe Street, Northbridge	1939	William G Bennett	
Devon House	729 Hay Street, Perth	1937	Baxter-Cox and Leighton	
Family Stores	471 Murray Street, Perth	Poss 1930		
Gledden Building	731-737 Hay Street, Perth	1938	Oldham, Boas and Ednie-Brown	
Harper's Buildings	810-824 Hay Street, Perth	1937	Edwin Summerhayes	
Hugh Howling Chemist	935 Hay Street, Perth	c1932	Reginald Summerhayes	
Motor House	68 Milligan Street, Perth	1937	William G. Bennett, Powell, Cameron and Chisholm	
P&O Building	56-58 William Street, Perth	1930	Hobbs, Smith and Forbes	
Pensioners Funeral Service	359 Beaufort Street, Perth	1937	Samuel Rosenthal	
Swan Building Society	215 James Street, Guildford	1937		

== Apartments and residential buildings ==
Name	Address	Date	Architect	Image
Attunga Flats	103 Thomas Street, Subiaco	1937	Marshall Clifton	
Bellevue Mansions	16 Bellevue Terrace, West Perth	late 1920s	Samuel Rosenthal	
Blue Waters	Canning Highway, Como	1954	K. D'Alton	
Bulwer Park Flats	196 Bulwer Street, Perth	1940	Harold Krantz	
Chisholm House	32 Genesta Crescent, Dalkeith	1939	Oswald Chisholm	
Flats 72 Stirling Hwy	72 Stirling Highway, Nedlands	1938	Howard Krantz	
Glendower Flats	15 Glendower Street, Perth			
Greenough Flats	114 Stirling Highway, Nedlands	1940	Horace Costello	
Kylemore	43 Jutland Parade, Dalkeith	1937	Horace Costello	
Lawson Apartments	2-4 Sherwood Court, Perth	1937	Hennessy, Hennessy & Co and Reginald Summerhayes	
Mayfair Flats	83 Carr Street, West Perth	1936	William G. Bennett	
New Court Flats	35 Mary Street, Highgate	1940		
Residence 135 Guildford Rd	135 Guildford Road, Maylands			
Rostrevor Flats	173 Goderich Street, Perth	1937	Cavanagh & Cavanagh	
Preston Flats	264 Stirling Street, East Perth	1940		
Sabovsky Flats	55 Stirling Highway, Nedlands	1940	Howard Krantz	
Tassia Court	11 Parry Street, Perth	1940		
Torbay Flats	189 Stirling Highway, Nedlands	1938		

== Cinemas and theatres ==
Name	Address	Date	Architect	Image
Astor Theatre	659 Beaufort Street, Mount Lawley	1939	William T. Leighton	
Como Theatre (formerly Cygnet Cinema)	16 Preston Street, Como	1938	William T. Leighton	
Luna Leederville (formerly New Oxford Theatre)	159 Oxford Street, Leederville	1927	Samuel B. Rosenthal	
Plaza Theatre and Arcade	650-658 Hay Street, Perth	1937	William G. Bennett	
Piccadilly Theatre and Arcade	700-704 Hay Street, Perth	1938	William T. Leighton	
Regal Theatre	474 Hay Street, Subiaco	1938	William G. Bennett	
Windsor Cinema	98 Stirling Highway, Nedlands	1937	William T. Leighton	
Wembley Lifecare Physiotherapy (former Wembley Theatre and Gardens)	202 Cambridge Street, Wembley	1937	Frank Coote and Samuel Rosenthal	

== Educational buildings ==
Name	Address	Date	Architect	Image
MLC Barclay House	Corry Lynn Road, Claremont	1939		
Royal West Australian Institute for the Blind (West Australian Ballet Company Centre)	134 Whatley Crescent, Maylands	1937	A. E. Clare	
Perth Girls' School	2 Wellington Street, East Perth	1936	A. E. Clare, Len Green & Len Walters	

== Hotels and pubs ==
Name	Address	Date	Architect	Image
Cottesloe Beach Hotel (former Hotel Cottesloe)	104 Marine Parade, cnr John Street, Cottesloe	1937	Hobbs, Forbes and Partners	
Criterion Hotel (former Regatta Hotel)	560 Hay Street, Perth	1937	Hobbs and Forbes	
Highway Hotel/Coronado Hotel (Claremont Medical Centre)	206 Stirling Highway, Claremont	1940	Reginald Summerhayes, Marshall Clifton	
Raffles Hotel	Canning Highway, Applecross	1937	William G. Bennett	

== Industrial buildings ==
Name	Address	Date	Architect	Image
East Perth Power Station	11 Summers Street, East Perth	1938		
Emu Brewery (Fmr) (Demolished 1991)	102 The Esplanade, Perth	1938	Oldham, Boas and Ednie-Brown	
Lincoln Street Ventilation Stack	57 Lincoln Street (cnr Smith Street), Highgate	1941	A. E. Clare	
Mackay's Aerated Waters	10-22 Money Street, Perth	1943	Powell, Cameron and Chisholm	
Magnet House (building)	393 Murray Street, Perth	1936		
South Fremantle Power Station	Robb Road, North Coogee	1946		
Former Michelides Tobacco Factory (Demolished 2014)	88 Roe Street (cnr Lake Street), Northbridge	1936	Oldham, Boas and Ednie-Brown	

== Institutional buildings and facilities ==
Name	Address	Date	Architect	Image
Centenary Pavilion, Royal Agricultural Society	Royal Show Grounds, 1 Ashton Avenue, Claremont	1929		
Co-Masonic Temple	110 Brisbane Street, Perth	1936	William G. Bennett	
Karrakatta Cemetery Columbarium	Railway Road, Karrakatta			
King Edward Memorial Hospital Entrance	Bagot Road, Subiaco	1938	A. E. Clare	
Masonic Hall (Druids Hall)	130 Guildford Road, Maylands	1937		
Perth Dental Hospital (now WA Country Health Service)	189 Wellington Street, Perth	1936	Reginald Summerhayes & George Rowe	
Royal Perth Hospital A Block and Wellington Street Entrance	197 Wellington Street, Perth	1939/1942	A. E. Clare	
St John’s Ambulance Building (Perth City YHA )	300 Wellington Street, Perth	1939	Ochiltree and Hargrave	
St. John Ambulance Claremont Sub Centre	282 Stirling Hwy, Claremont	1965		
Swan Army Barracks East Wing	2 Francis Street, Northbridge	1939	M Finlayson	

== Religious buildings ==
Name	Address	Date	Architect	Image
First Church of Christ, Scientist, Perth	264 St Georges Terrace (cnr Elder Street), Perth	1939	Ochiltree & Hargrave	
Greek Orthodox Cathedral of St Helene & St Constantine	20 Parker Street, Northbridge	1937	Harold Boas of Oldham, Boas & Ednie Browne	
Immaculate Conception Catholic Parish	154 Canning Highway, East Fremantle	1940	William Tracey (Cavanagh and Cavanagh)	
St Columba's Church	25 Forrest Street, South Perth	1937	Edgar le Blond Henderson	
St Mary’s Anglican Church	9 Ridge Street, South Perth	1936	William G. Bennett (Eales, Cohen and Bennett)	

== Public buildings and facilities ==
Name	Address	Date	Architect	Image
Tivoli Hall (former Applecross District Hall)	Canning Beach Road (cnr Kintail Road), Applecross		Eales, Cohen and Fitzhardinge	
Christian Lyon Building (former electrical substation)	496 Stirling Highway, Cottesloe			
Claremont Municipal Chambers	308 Stirling Highway, Claremont	1935	Reginald Summerhayes	
Edith Dircksey Cowan Memorial	Kings Park, Perth	1934	Harold Boas	
Guildford Council Chambers	97 James Street, Guildford	1900 Remodelled 1937	John Fitzhardinge of Eales, Cohen and Fitzhardinge	
Guildford Fire Station	2 Meadow Street, Guildford	1934	K C Duncan	
Guildford Town Hall	99 James Street (cnr Meadow Street), Guildford	1937	John Fitzhardinge of Eales, Cohen and Fitzhardinge	
Camelot Cinemas (former Mosman Park Memorial Hall)	Lochee Street, Mosman Park	1939	Kreitmeyer and Rowe	
McNess Memorial Fountain	Florence Hummerston Reserve, Perth	1940	William G Bennett	
Nedlands Park Masonic Hall	6-8 Broadway, Crawley	1935	William G. Bennett	
Sir J. J. Talbot Hobbs Memorial	Supreme Court Gardens, Perth	1940	Hobbs, Winning and Leighton	

== Sports buildings ==
Name	Address	Date	Architect	Image
Nedlands Tennis Club	Cnr Bruce Street and Gallop Road	1937	Harold Krantz and Neil Perkins	
Mount Lawley Bowls Club	Cnr Storthes and Rookwood Streets, Mount Lawley	1936	William G. Bennett	
Perth Oval Entrance	27 Bulwer Street, Perth,	1933	City Engineers Office	

== Country buildings ==
Name	Address	Date	Architect	Image
Lord Forrest Olympic Pool	Cnr Cassidy and McDonald Streets, Kalgoorlie	1938	William G. Bennett	
Sawyers Valley Tavern	10860 Great Eastern Highway, Sawyers Valley	1937	William G. Bennett	

== Non Deco buildings of the era ==
Name	Address	Date	Architect	Image
Carlton Hotel	248-260 Hay Street (cnr Goderich Street), East Perth	1928	Eales and Cohen	
Walsh's Building	88 William Street, Perth	1923	Talbot Hobbs	

== Photo gallery ==
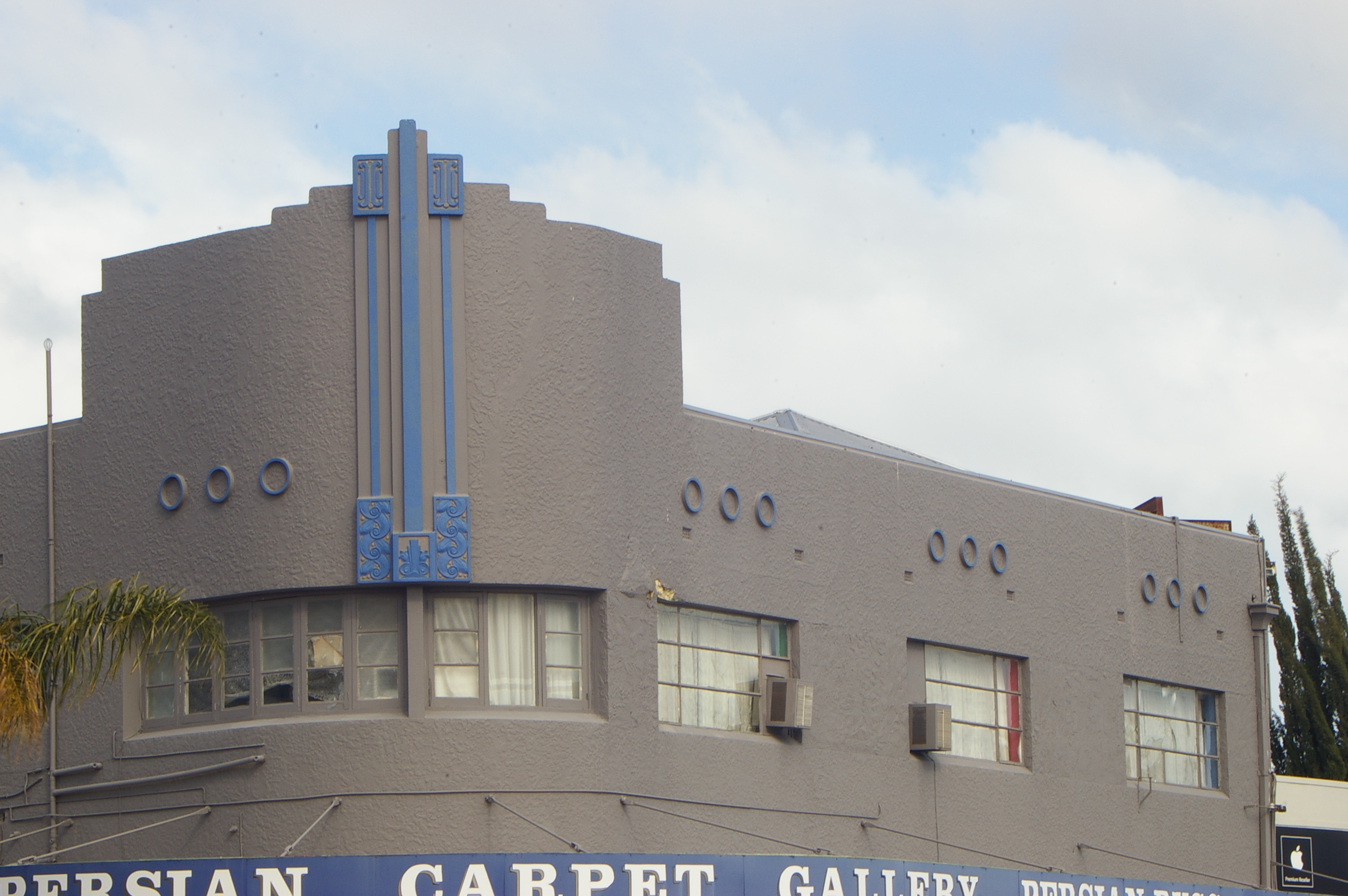
Art deco building next door to the Windsor Cinema in Nedlands

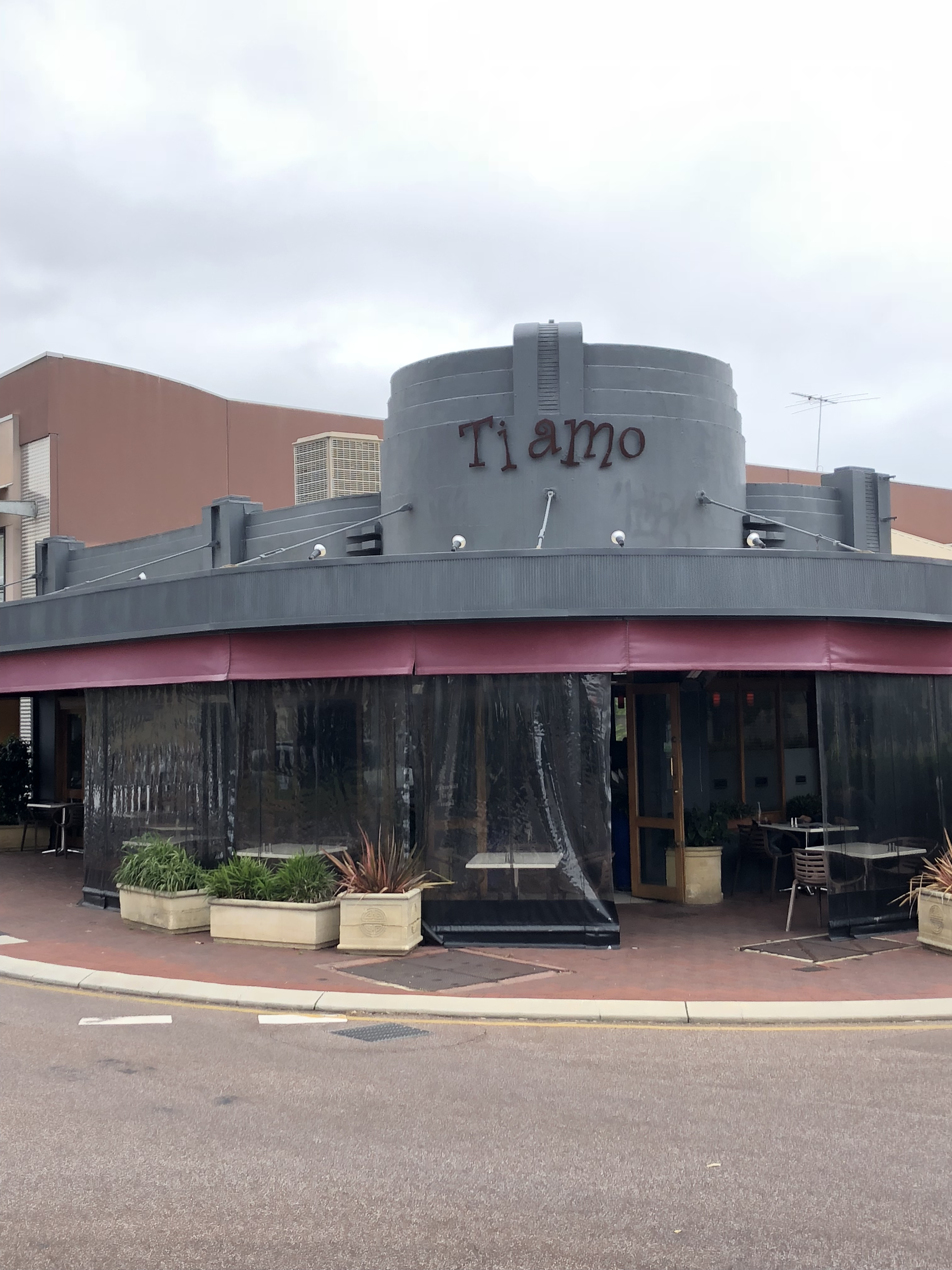
Cafe Tiamo, Nedlands

== See also ==
- List of Art Deco architecture
- List of Art Deco architecture in Oceania
