= Hugh Vivian Taylor =

Australian architect (born 1894)

Hugh Vivian Taylor (1894-1981) was a prominent Australian architect, construction engineer and acoustic consultant, known for his work in both fields.

Born in 1894, Taylor's early education was at Swinburne Technical College, but his architectural career was forged under unique circumstances. Following service in World War I, Taylor could not afford a formal apprenticeship, so he worked on building sites saving money and eventually passing the Royal Institute of British Architects exams to qualify as an architect in 1921. By 1925, he had returned from London to Australia and formed the architectural firm H. Vivian Taylor & Soilleux with Garnet Argyle Soilleux, a collaboration that lasted for many years. In 1933 Best Overend, another prominent Melbourne architect joined the firm, and for several years, the practice operated as Taylor, Soilleux & Overend. After Overend left in 1937, the firm reverted to its previous name of Taylor, Soilleux. Taylor's partnership with Soilleux, and the earlier experiences gained while working with modernist architect Wells Coates in London, brought a modern, functional aesthetic to his architectural designs, marrying form and function. The firm was wound up in 1941 with the advent of WWII, and afterwards Taylor turned to work primarily as an acoustics consultant, eventually helping to form the Australian Acoustical Society in the late 1960s.

His groundbreaking work in the field of architectural acoustics coincided with of sound being introduced to films, which spurred a need for acoustic solutions in preexisting cinemas and theatres in Melbourne and around Australia. Over the course of his career, he collaborated with other architects as well as theatre and cinema owners to optimise the acoustic environment of over 400 venues across Australia. Some of his most notable work as an acoustic consultant included the refurbishment of Melbourne's Her Majesty's Theatre, the Houses of Parliament in South Australia, and after WWII radio studios for the ABC. During the partnership with Soilleux and with Overend, the firm also designed a succession of complete Art Deco cinemas, amongst the most interesting of the era, now all lost except for the Rivoli Theatre in East Hawthorn, Melbourne.

Hugh Vivian Taylor's contributions advancing both architecture and acoustic design in Australia were formally acknowledged when he was elected as the first Fellow of the Australian Acoustical Society in 1972. Also, the Association of Australasian Acoustical Consultants (AAAC) gives out an award named after him each year. His firm's legacy has been compromised by the number of theatres and cinemas that he worked on being pulled down in recent decades to make way for other types of buildings. One of the best examples that remains today is the heritage listed Rivoli theatre in Hawthorn East.
