= Gledden Building =

Heritage listed building in Perth, Western Australia

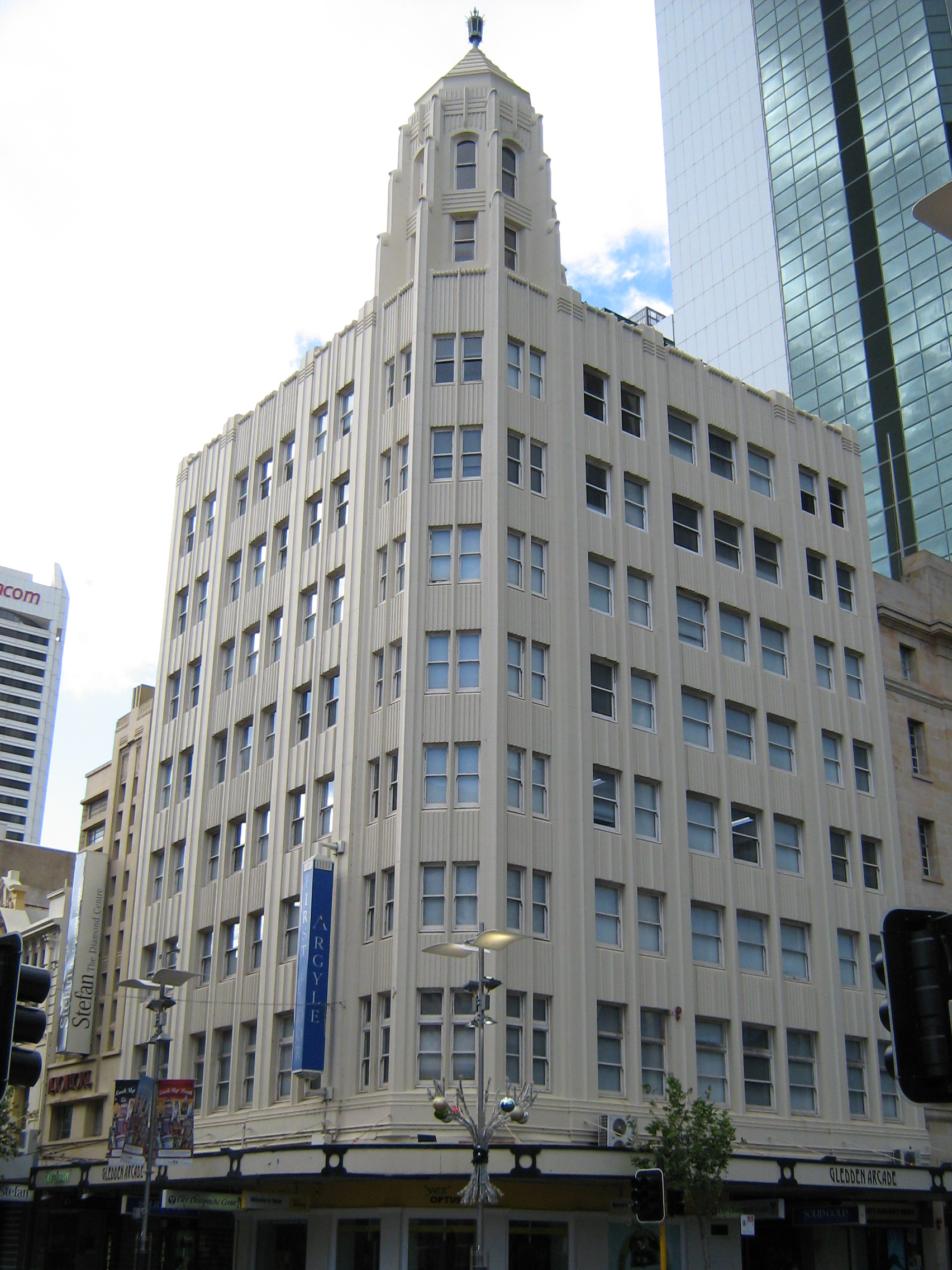
- Gledden Building – cnr Hay and William Streets
- Interactive map of the Gledden Building area

General information
- Architectural style: Art deco
- Location: Perth, Western Australia, 731–737 Hay Street
- Coordinates: 31.954827°S 115.860351°E
- Construction started: 25 March 1937
- Inaugurated: 13 May 1938
- Renovated: 1984; 1990
- Cost: £36,845
- Renovation cost: $363,000 (1990)
- Owner: Primewest Management

Technical details
- Structural system: Reinforced concrete
- Floor count: 7

Design and construction
- Architects: Harold Boas; John Oldham; William Bennett
- Architecture firm: Oldham, Boas and Ednie-Brown
- Main contractor: A.T. Brine and Company

Western Australia Heritage Register
- Type: State Registered Place
- Designated: 1 December 1995
- Reference no.: 2002

The Gledden Building is an Art Deco office building in Perth, Western Australia. The building was constructed on land that had been bequeathed to the University of Western Australia by surveyor Robert Gledden.

== Site and brief ==
The building is located on the corner of William Street and Hay Street in the Perth Central Business District. It is one of three heritage buildings on the corner – the other two being the Walsh's Building and the Wesley Church. It is located between two shorter heritage-listed art deco buildings – Devon House and the P&O Building (also known as the Orient Line building and the Malaysia Airlines building).

The land on which the building now sits was once part of a lot that extended along William Street between Hay Street and St Georges Terrace. The lot was originally acquired by William Leeder in 1833 but changed hands a number of times and eventually was subdivided. The plot acquired by Robert Gledden became property of the University of Western Australia in 1927.

By September 1936, the UWA Senate had agreed to erect a new building on the site and put out a tender to build the structure. After an unsuccessful tender process in October 1936, the designs were redrawn and a new tender was called in January 1937. A.T. Brine and Company was the successful tenderer with a price of £36,845, under the forecast budget.

== Architecture ==
Architect and town planner Harold Boas was one of the key proponents of building on the site. In late 1935 Boas presented a proposal to the UWA board for an office tower with a two-level retail arcade. Boas' design was inspired by the vertical emphasis employed in many American skyscrapers of the day especially in New York City and Chicago – most notably the Barclay-Vesey Building and the Chicago Tribune Tower.

=== Friezes ===
In September 1937, while the building was still under construction, the university held a competition to design friezes for the ground level retail arcade. The competition called for friezes to include motifs representative of Western Australian flora and fauna. Western Australian artists George Benson, Clem Kennedy and William G. Bennett were the three winners of the competition and their works were included in the final construction. The friezes remain in place.

== Construction ==
Construction began on the building in March 1937 and was completed by May 1938.

=== Construction materials ===
Reinforced concrete was used in construction of the building. This was the largest scale building in Perth to use this technique to that date.

=== Features ===
At construction the building featured a two-level retail arcade, a basement restaurant, an observation tower as well as several levels of office space. The second level of the retail arcade, the basement restaurant and the observation tower are no longer open to public access.

== Current use ==
The ground level retail arcade is still in use and several office levels are still occupied. The basement is now used in part as retail space as well as for storage.

== In art ==
The Gledden Building inspired architect and artist John Oldham to paint a watercolour depicting the building set in a New York-style cityscape.

== Heritage status ==
The Gledden Building is listed on a number of heritage lists due to its status as the only inter-war art deco high-rise office building remaining in Perth. The building was listed on the Register of the National Estate in 1998 and classified by the National Trust of Australia in 1989.
