= Applecross ferry terminal =

Proposed ferry terminal in Applecross, Western Australia

Applecross

General information
- Location: Canning Beach Road, Applecross; Western Australia; Australia
- Coordinates: 32.009945°S 115.851651°E
- Owner: Public Transport Authority

Other information
- Fare zone: 1
Location

The Applecross ferry terminal is a proposed ferry terminal in Applecross, on the Canning River in Perth, Western Australia. Located next to the Raffles Hotel, the terminal will be served by Transperth ferries running to Elizabeth Quay via Matilda Bay.

== Description ==
The Applecross ferry terminal is located next to the Raffles Hotel, and will provide access to bus services along Canning Highway and the surrounding area as well.

== History ==
Development applications for the Applecross and Matilda Bay terminals were lodged in September 2025. In November 2025, the Environmental Protection Authority ruled that the ferry terminal would not need a formal environmental assessment. In May 2026, tenders were sought for the construction of the two ferry terminals.

Opposition to the Applecross ferry terminal has been lower than opposition to the Matilda Bay terminal. In August 2025, some Applecross residents, who formed the Canning Bridge Ferry Action Group, called for the terminal to be located across the river at Como instead. They claimed that the Applecross location would be dangerous for dolphins and swans. Some City of Melville councillors voiced concerns that the Applecross terminal would not be well integrated with bus or train services. One councillor said that the Applecross jetty would be a better location, whereas another councillor said Point Walter would be better.
