= P&O Building =

P&O Building may refer to:

- P&O Building (Fremantle)
- P&O Building (Perth)
