= Cairo Flats =

Coordinates: 37.8030°S 144.9746°E

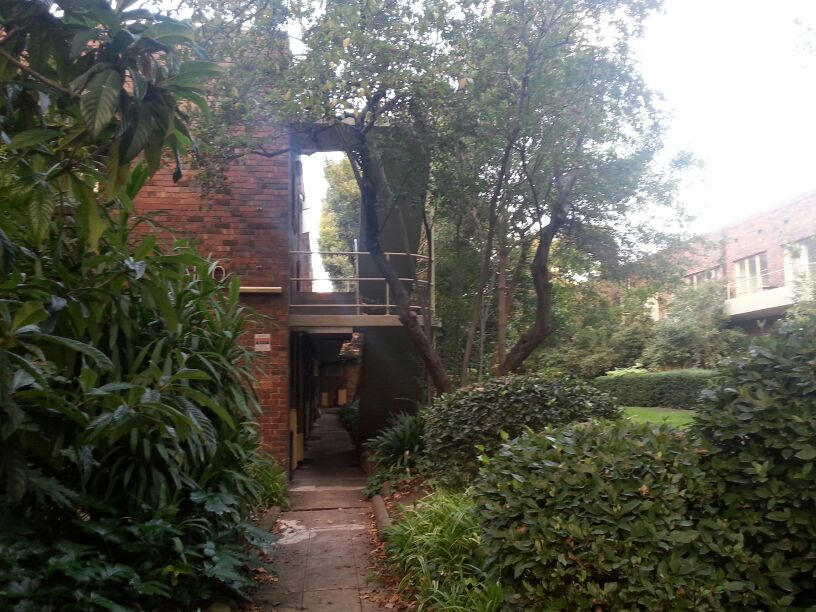
- Interactive map of the Cairo Flats area

General information
- Location: 98 Nicholson Street, Fitzroy, Melbourne, Australia
- Completed: 1936

Design and construction
- Architect: Best Overend
- Architecture firm: Taylor Soilleux & Overend

Website
- https://cairoflats.com.au/

Cairo Flats, also colloquially known as Cairo Bachelor Flats or Cairo, is a heritage-listed apartment building in the Melbourne inner city suburb of Fitzroy. Cairo Flats derives its name from the Egyptian capital city. While several theories have been proposed regarding the reason for this name, no official documentation exists to substantiate any of them, leaving the matter open to speculation. Cairo Flats is situated opposite the Royal Exhibition Building in the Carlton Gardens, a UNESCO World Heritage Site. As a result, Cairo also sits within the World Heritage Environs Area (WHEA) overlay that surrounds this precinct.

The building was designed in 1935 by modernist architect Acheson Best Overend and completed in December 1936 by Blease Macpherson & Co. Cairo is a U-shaped, two story building comprising 28 apartments, mostly studio flats. Overend was influenced by modernist architect Wells Coates and the "minimum flat concept". Each apartment was designed to "provide maximum amenity in minimum space for minimum rent". Internally, all features were designed to be minimal and fully integrated. Designed for the middle-class bachelor, wardrobes, dressing tables, cupboards, shelves, kitchen tables, chairs and the bed were all incorporated as built-in elements, so that only a suitcase of clothing was required when moving in. Externally, the building's cantilevered external concrete stairs are noted as an unusual innovation and feature.

Amongst a plethora of examples of blocks of flats in the modernist style, Cairo stands alone as a building designed in the 1930s with the purpose of providing high quality housing for bachelors in Melbourne. Architectural historian Professor Philip Goad included Cairo Flats in his Australian Modernism: Top 10 series, highlighting the building's significance in promoting a new way of living.

The site on which Cairo sits was previously home to Uxbridge House, a private residence and then private hospital, which fell into a state of disrepair and was demolished to make way for Cairo. All that remains from the time that Uxbridge occupied the site is the original Hanover Street Brick Wall, which dates from the 1870s.

Cairo has been the residence of architects John Mockeridge and Frederick Romberg.

== See also ==
- Cairo (novel)
