= William Bates (Australian politician) =

Australian politician

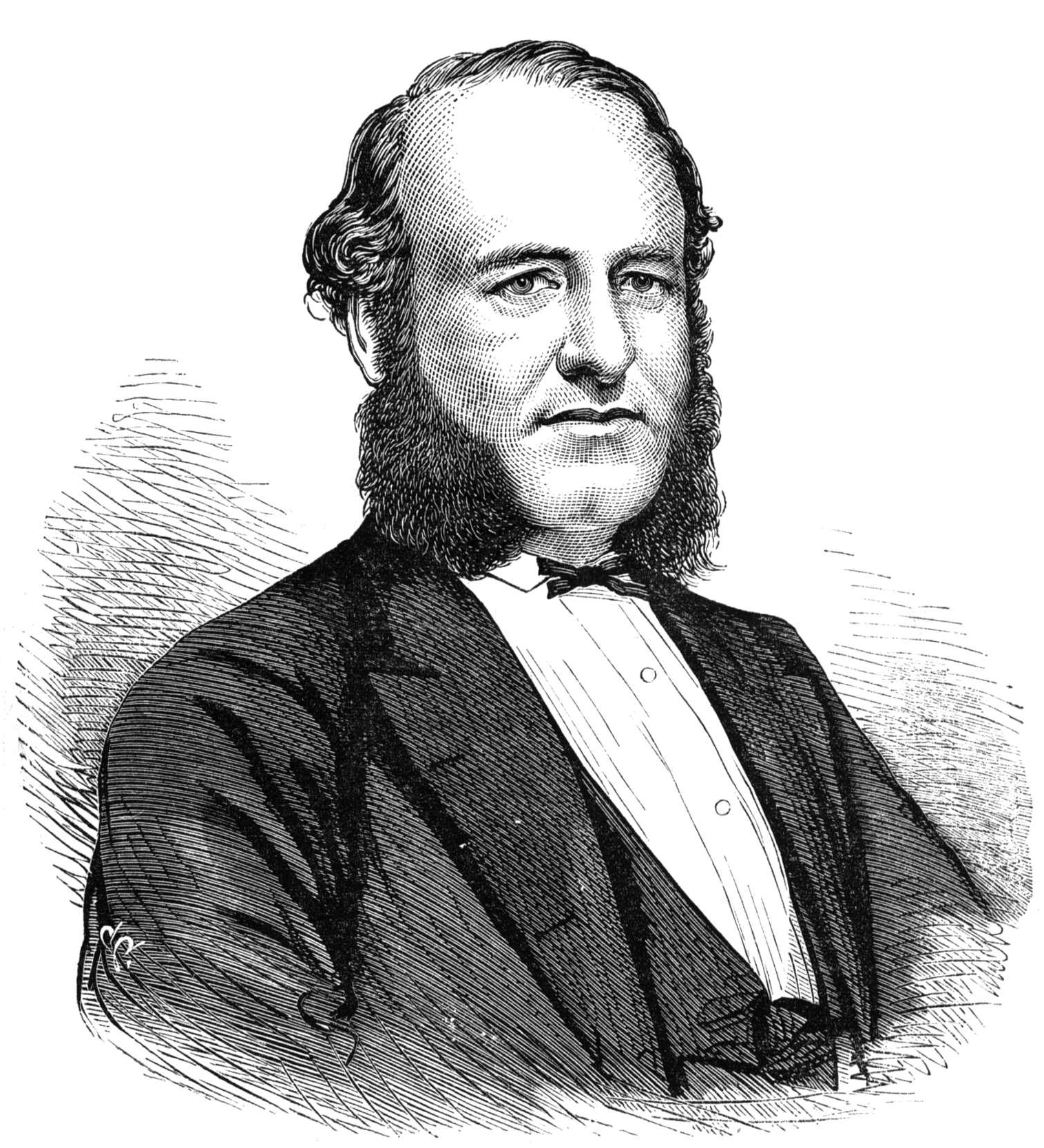
William Bates, 1870 engraving

The Hon William Bates MLA (27 February 1825 – 12 January 1891) was a politician in colonial Victoria, Australia.

Bates was born at Uxbridge, in Middlesex, and emigrated to South Australia in 1850. In 1852 the gold discoveries tempted him to Victoria, where he went into business at Sandhurst, and after four years' successful trading, removed to Melbourne, where he had a prosperous career as a general merchant. In 1868 he was returned to the Victorian Legislative Assembly for the electoral district of Collingwood as a supporter of the Darling Grant, defeating no less a candidate than the Hon James Service. He was Minister of Public Works in the M'Culloch Government from April 1870 to June 1871, but did not re-enter Parliament after 1874, though he contested for the districts of Fitzroy (1877) and Collingwood again (1880). Mr. Bates was a prominent member of the Congregationalist body, and was Treasurer of the Jubilee Fund which was raised a few years ago to celebrate the jubilee of the establishment of the first church of the denomination in Victoria. That movement was so successful that close upon £48,000 was raised, and the denomination was able to pay off the debts on all its churches in the colony.

William Bates married Anne Cramer Williams in Melbourne in 1857, and they had 2 sons and 5 daughters. In the 1860s, he moved his family to Nicholson Street, Fitzroy, and they lived at Uxbridge House. Mr. Bates died at Uxbridge, in Melbourne, on 12 January 1891, at the age of sixty-five.
