= Robert Gledden =

Robert John Gledden (26 December 1855 – 5 November 1927) was an English-born Australian surveyor and public benefactor.

Gledden was born at Bishopwearmouth, Sunderland, County Durham, England.

The Gledden Building in Perth was named in his honour.
