= Uxbridge House =

Coordinates: 37.8030°S 144.9746°E

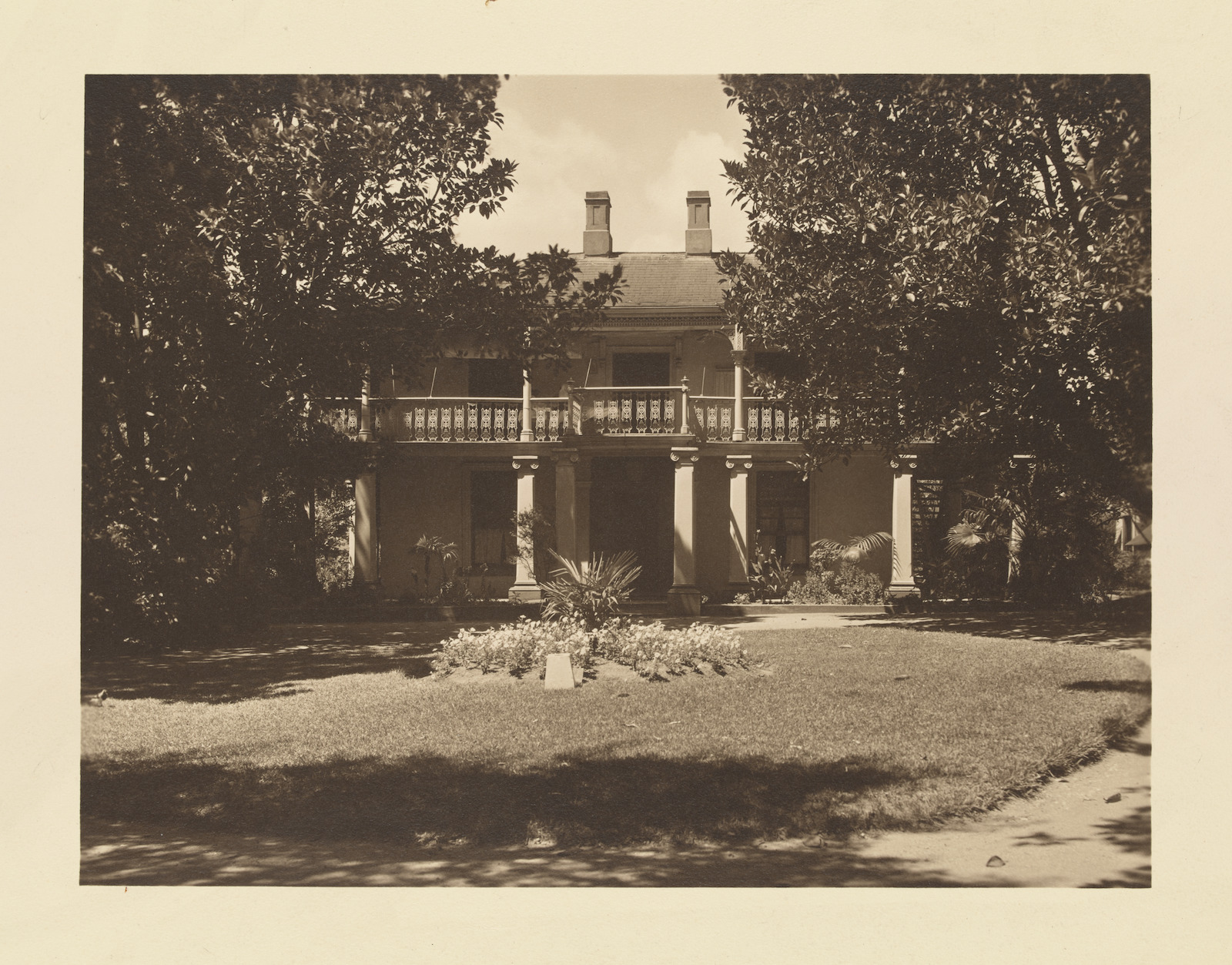
Uxbridge House

Uxbridge House was built circa 1845 on Nicholson Street in the Melbourne suburb of Fitzroy, Australia. The site ownership changed hands several times, but the most prominent owner was William Bates who lived there from the 1860s until his death in 1891. The house was named by William Bates after his hometown of Uxbridge in Middlesex, England.

Following the death of William Bates in 1891, the family moved out and by 1895 Uxbridge House had become a private hospital. By the mid 1930s the hospital was in a state of disrepair. A fire, reported in The Argus is also said to have damaged parts of the building. The site was a prime candidate for renewal, as Melbourne was also suffering from a lingering housing shortage. What remained of Uxbridge House was demolished in 1935 to make way for Cairo Flats in 1936. All that currently remains from Uxbridge House is the original Hanover Street Brick Wall, which runs along the northern boundary of the site and dates from the 1860s.

Various articles in The Argus also show that the original address of Uxbridge House was 90 Nicholson Street, Fitzroy. However the site that Cairo Flats occupies is now known as 98 Nicholson Street in Fitzroy.
