= Plaza Theatre, Perth =

Cinema in Perth, Australia

Plaza Theatre and Arcade
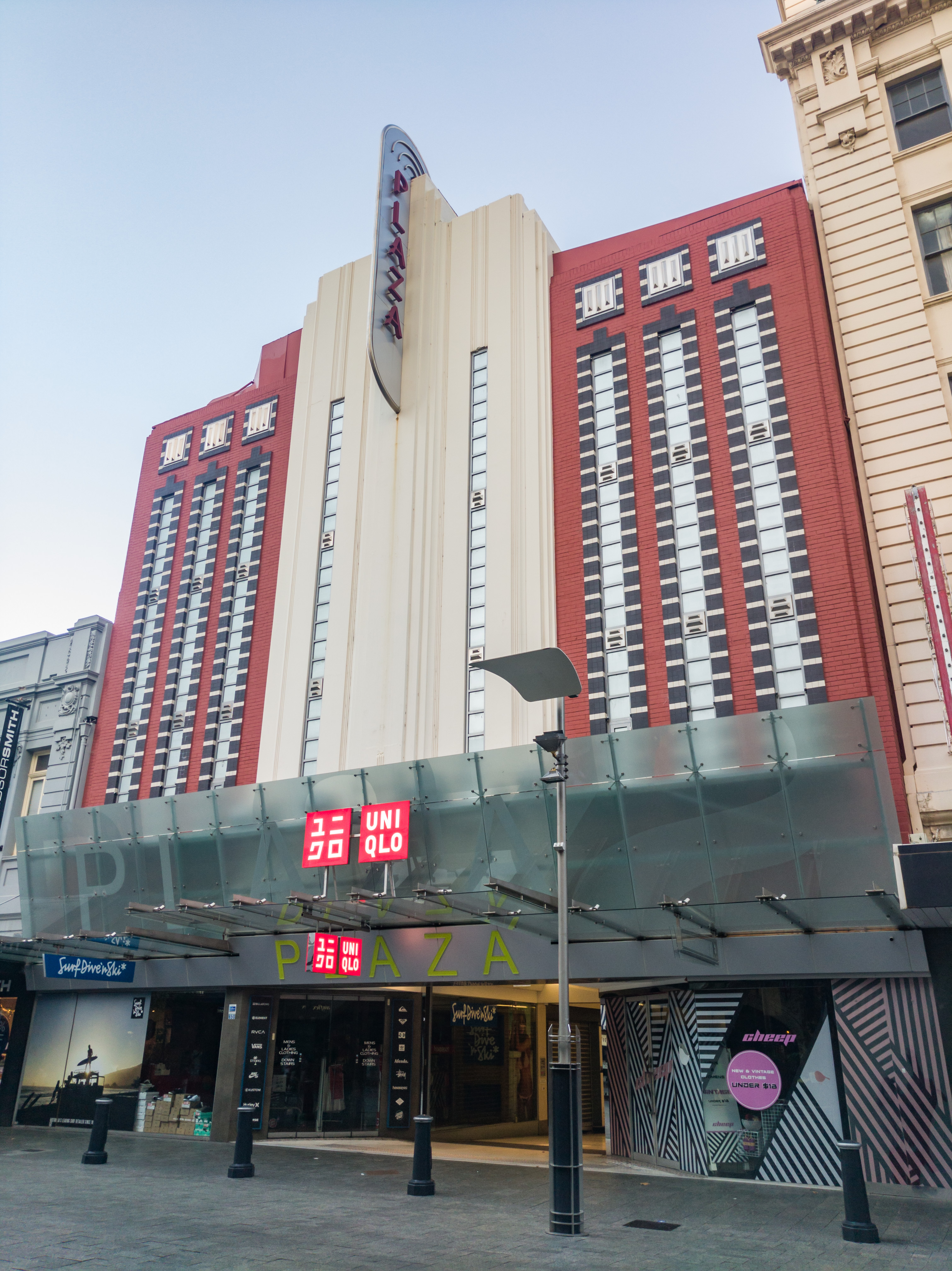
- Plaza Theatre facade (Hay Street Mall)
- Alternative names: Paris Theatre

General information
- Architectural style: Streamline Moderne/Art Deco
- Location: Hay Street, Perth, Western Australia, Australia
- Coordinates: 31°57′15″S 115°51′34″E
- Inaugurated: 17 September 1937; 89 years ago
- Client: Hoyts Theatres Ltd

Design and construction
- Architects: William G. Bennett; H. Vivian Taylor
- Main contractor: E. Allwood (Theatre); W. Drabble Ltd (Arcade)

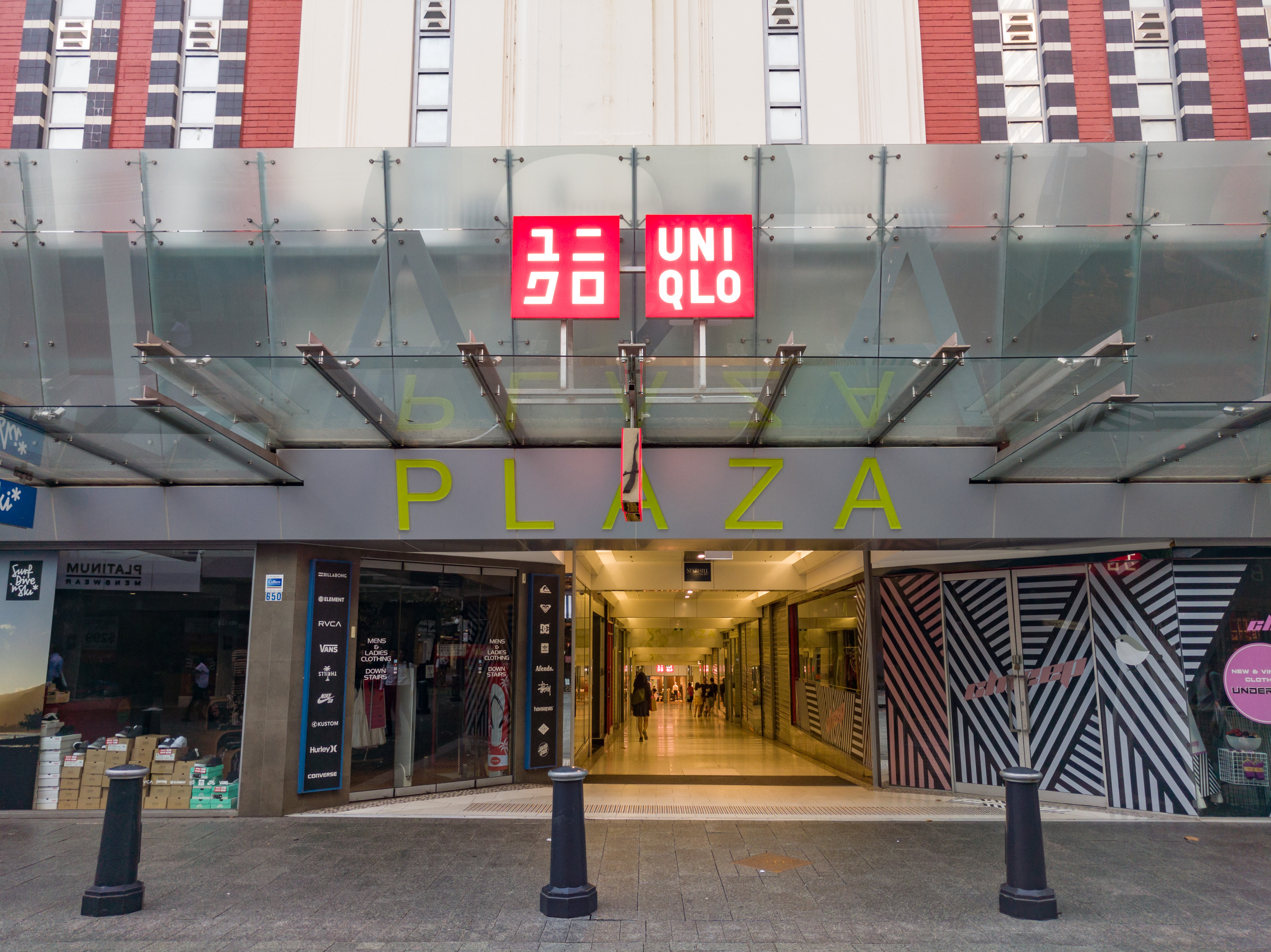
Hay Street Mall entrance to Plaza Arcade

The former Plaza Theatre is located at 650–658 Hay Street, Perth, Western Australia. It was the first purpose-designed Art Deco cinema in Perth. The Plaza Theatre opened in 1937 and was built for Hoyts Theatres Ltd.

== History ==
The Plaza Theatre was opened on Hay Street on 17 September 1937 with a seating capacity of 1,275 divided into lounge, circle and stalls. The first feature film screened at the theatre was Lloyd's of London. Built on the site of the former Majestic Picture Theatre, the theatre was part of a new arcade development linking Hay and Murray Streets. The arcade remains one of Perth's busiest, while the theatre has been closed and put to other uses in recent decades.

Designed by William G. Bennett in association with Melbourne's H. Vivian Taylor & Soilleux, the facade of the theatre/arcade is narrow but dramatic, presenting a stylised skyscraper effect in classic art deco fashion. It opened a year in advance of the rival development of the Piccadilly Theatre and Arcade, located 60 metres further to the west on Hay Street.

Like its late-1930s rivals – the Piccadilly Theatre and the Metro Theatre (on William Street) – the Plaza offered more comfort for Perth's movie-goers. Unlike the atmospheric Ambassadors Theatre (across the street from the Plaza) and the monumental Capitol Theatre (on William Street), the new-wave art deco cinemas were compact and modern.

In 1940 the Plaza was modernised and remodelled at a cost of £15,000. Further renovations, including the refurbishing of the interior and the installation of a Todd-AO sound system, were completed before the opening of South Pacific in 1960, which established a new long-run record for Perth of 45 weeks. The seating capacity of the theatre was reduced to less than one thousand in 1961. With increased capacity, a new screen and plusher appointments, the Plaza became Hoyts' premier theatre in Western Australia.

On 17 August 1965 the theatre closed and re-opened two days later as the Paris. Soon after, Hoyts relinquished their lease to the Ace Theatre group. With the advent of the multi-screen central city and suburban complexes, the theatre was closed permanently in 1984, briefly becoming a youth disco.

In 2003 the Plaza Arcade was acquired by Lease Equity, on behalf of Atzemis Berbatis Group for $26 million. In August 2005 a major refurbishment of the Arcade commenced, under the supervision of Bollig Architects with construction by Link Projects and Project Management. The $5 million redevelopment featured new Italian terrazzo mall tiles, modern ceiling works, new facade lighting and glass panelling, and was completed in October 2006.

== Architectural character ==
The Plaza Arcade has 40 convenience based shops on the ground floor, with the former cinema above. The arcade entrance at Hay and Murray Streets is located centrally within the facade, with a shop on either side. The facade of the building at Hay Street has been constructed in the Inter-war Art Deco style. At first floor level the facade is divided into three bays, symmetrically composed around the dominant central bay. This bay is rendered. The flanking bays are painted brickwork. The shops below the canopy have been modernised.

Architecture historian Ross Thorne provides the following description:

The facade to Hay St had a symbolic skyscraper effect. There were tall strips of windows; the centre third was taller than and projected from the remainder. Stepping from the centre of this central bay was the vertical sign which projected above the roof and curved back and down into the modern ziggurat roof form. The auditorium was rather simple in fibrous plaster, striated lines and straight ceiling coves accentuated the long dimension of the room. The slightly lower sections each side of the ceiling, as well as incorporating indirect lighting coves to wash light across upper ceiling levels and down the walls, probably boxed in the airconditioning ducts.

== Heritage value ==
The Plaza Theatre and Arcade was classified by the National Trust of Western Australia on 3 December 1990.

== See also ==
- List of Art Deco buildings in Perth
- List of Streamline Moderne cinemas in Australia
