= H. Vivian Taylor & Soilleux =

Defunct firm in Melbourne, Australia

Practice information
- Firm type: Partnership
- Partners: Hugh Vivian Taylor; Garnet Argyle Soilleux; Best Overend (1933–1937)
- Founded: 1925
- Dissolved: 1941
- Location: Melbourne, Victoria, Australia

Significant works and honors
- Buildings: Rivoli Theatre
- Design: Streamline Moderne / Art Deco

H. Vivian Taylor & Soilleux was an architectural firm based in Melbourne, Victoria, Australia, noted for producing some of the most stylish Streamline Moderne and Art Deco cinemas in the 1930s Australia, all now demolished or extensively altered except for the Rivoli, in Hawthorn East. The firm operated from 1925 until its dissolution in 1941.

== History ==
The Encyclopedia of Australian Architecture stated that Hugh Vivian Taylor formed a partnership with fellow Melbourne architect, Garnet Argyle Soilleux in 1925. However, from contemporary newspapers articles and the H Vivian Taylor collection of drawings at the State Library of Victoria, they seemed to work independently until 1928. In 1933, young architect Best Overend, who had earlier articled with Taylor and just returned form a period living and working in London with noted modern firms, joined as a partner, with the practice operating as Taylor, Soilleux & Overend. This partnership continued until 1937, when Overend departed overseas again, and the firm returned to the previous name. For many years they operated out of an office in Little Collins Street in Melbourne. With the onset of WWII, the firm was wound up in 1941.

== Design expertise ==
From 1928, Taylor became on the first Australian specialists in architectural acoustics, and with the introduction of sound to movies in Australia in 1929, the firm became busy refurbishing cinemas and theatres that had not been designed with any consideration for the way sound would bounce around the cinema. He gave a lecture to the Australian Institute of Architects on the topic in 1932. An early example was the 'acoustical treatment' of the Crown Theatre in Victoria Street, Richmond (much later known as the Valhalla) in 1931, and another the remodeling of the 1914 Palace Theatre in North Fitzroy with 'sound absorbing materials' in 1933. The firm is thought to have acted as acoustic consultants for other architects and theatre owners for hundreds of cinemas and theatres right across Australia. An example of this was consulting with C N Hollinshead & Albion Walkley on the reconstruction of the auditorium of His Majesty's Theatre in Exhibition Street in 1934.

The firm also designed numerous complete cinemas in Melbourne and elsewhere in Australia, which were acoustically considered and amongst the most stylish and innovative of the many designed in the Art Deco style in the 1930s. The auditorium interiors were particularly notable, some featuring complex curved lines and forms and unique patterns, for instance the ceiling decoration at the Rivoli is composed of interlocking cog wheels. The exteriors of the Rivoli in East Hawthorn and the Ozone in Mildura were also notable for featuring bolly modelled forms in the Streamline Moderne polychrome brickwork. Six of their theatres featured very unusual freestanding ticket boxes in the foyers, for instance in the form of a sphere, a teardrop, and a crystalline pillar.

With the arrival of the outer suburban Drive-In and then television in 1956, audiences for independent cinemas dramatically declined through the 1960s leading to the closure and alteration or demolition of the majority of interwar cinemas across the country, including almost all that were designed by the firm. Their major legacy is the heritage-listed Rivoli Theatre in Hawthorn East.

== Cinema projects ==
Practice	Year	Project	Location	Description	Image	Notes
Taylor, Soilleux & Overend	1935	Carnegie Theatre	Woorayl St, Carnegie	Internal reconstruction of an earlier theatre; closed in 1959, demolished in 1985		
Taylor, Soilleux & Overend	1936	Hoyts Windsor Theatre	Cnr Albert & Peel Sts, Windsor	Closed in 1962, demolished in 1992		
Taylor, Soilleux & Overend	1937	Regal Hartwell	Cnr Camberwell & Toorak Rds, Camberwell	Closed in 1959, later demolished		
Taylor, Soilleux & Overend	1937	Padua Theatre	214 Sydney Rd, Brunswick	Renamed as the Metropolitan Theatre in 1969, screening Italian language films; demolished in 1982		
Taylor, Soilleux & Overend	1937	Hoyts Albury	483 Olive St, Albury, New South Wales	Demolished in 1974		
Taylor, Soilleux & Overend	1937	Hoyts Plaza Theatre (Note: As consultants/collaborators with William G. Bennett.)	Plaza Arcade, Hay St, Perth, Western Australia	Renamed as the Paris theatre in 1965; closed in 1984, elements extant		
Taylor & Soilleux	1938	Oriana Theatre	High St, Fremantle, Western Australia	Remodelled in 1949, demolished in 1972		
Taylor & Soilleux	1938	Ozone	Langtree Ave, Mildura	Closed in 1971, later demolished		
Taylor & Soilleux	1939	Hoyts Park Theatre	319 Montague St, Albert Park	Demolished in 1962		
Taylor & Soilleux	1939	Yallourn Theatre (Note: As consultants/collaborators with W. E. Gower.)	Town Square, Yallourn	Closed in 1979, demolished in 1983		
Taylor & Soilleux	1940	Rivoli Theatre	200 Camberwell Rd, East Hawthorn	Twinned in 1968; expanded as a multiplex in 2000		
Taylor & Soilleux	1940	Century Newsreel Theatre	125 Swanston St, Melbourne	Located in the basement of the Century Building; closed in 1985; converted into a live music venue		
Taylor & Soilleux	1941	Maling Theatre (Note: As consultants/collaborators with Nevillle Hollinshead.)	Maling Rd, Canterbury	Closed in 1959, destroyed by fire in 1990		

== Sell also ==
- Architecture of Melbourne
- List of Streamline Moderne cinemas
- Streamline Moderne architecture
