= Matilda Bay ferry terminal =

Matilda Bay

General information
- Location: Hackett Drive, Crawley; Western Australia; Australia
- Owner: Public Transport Authority

Other information
- Fare zone: 1

The Matilda Bay ferry terminal is a proposed ferry terminal in Matilda Bay on the Swan River in Perth, Western Australia. Located next to the University of Western Australia in Crawley, the terminal will be served by Transperth ferries running between Elizabeth Quay and Applecross.

== Description ==
The Matilda Bay ferry terminal is located next to the University of Western Australia (UWA), and will provide access to the Queen Elizabeth II Medical Centre and the surrounding area as well.

== History ==
In 2021, UWA's Crawley campus master plan for the next decade said that a ferry terminal should be built in Matilda Bay.

Five locations were considered: North Matilda Bay, Central Matilda Bay, South Matilda Bay, Pelican Point boat ramp, and Jo Jo's Jetty. Out of the five locations, the Central Matilda Bay site was chosen in July 2025. This was approximately 300 metres (980 ft) south of the government's initially preferred location. The new site was chosen to provide space for other river users, including rowing clubs. Some water users said placing the ferry terminal at Jo Jo's Jetty, further south, but there were other water users, such as wind and kite surfers, who used that location. The site was also further from UWA, on a floodplain, would disturb protected seagrass, and was close to the Swan Estuary Marine Park. Transport Minister Rita Saffioti said that not all would approve of the location, but that the ferry terminal would be built in central Matilda Bay anyway.

Development applications for the Matilda Bay and Applecross terminals were lodged in September 2025. In November 2025, the Environmental Protection Authority ruled that the ferry terminal would not need a formal environmental assessment. In May 2026, tenders were sought for the construction of the two ferry terminals.

The ferry terminal is opposed by the Western Australian Liberal Party, including the local Member of Parliament, Jonathan Huston. In September 2025, he started a petition on Change.org to "Save Matilda Bay", which has received over 1,500 signatures. Later that month, he voiced his opposition to the terminal in the Western Australian Legislative Assembly. On 20 September, a community get-together was held at Matilda Bay, which was organised by Huston. Greens MP Brad Pettitt spoke at the event as well. Huston claimed that despite his opposition to the ferry terminal, he is not a NIMBY. In 2026, an application to stop the terminal from being built was made to the federal government by an unnamed Noongar woman under the Aboriginal and Torres Strait Islander Heritage Protection Act 1984, claiming the terminal would "permanently alter the cultural landscape, desecrate sacred sites, sever ongoing cultural practices, and irreversibly degrade the environment".
