= Best Overend =

Australian architect

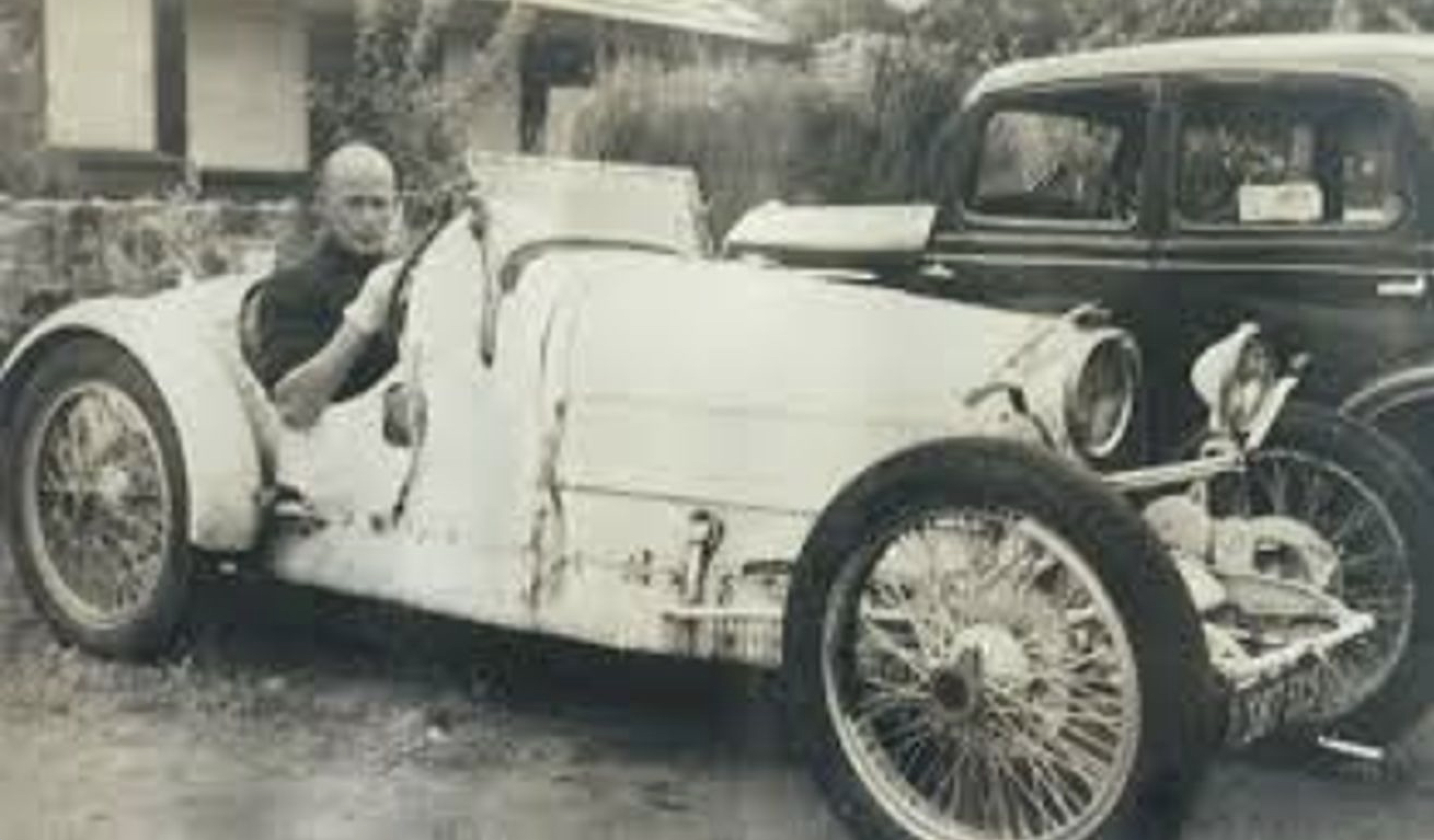
- Best Overend in a 1926 Grand Prix Type 37 Bugatti
- Born: Acheson Best Overend; 15 October 1909; Launceston, Tasmania
- Died: 28 July 1977 (aged 67)
- Citizenship: Australian
- Education: Swinburne Technical College, University of Melbourne
- Occupation: Architect
- Years active: 1931—1977
- Spouse: Bernice Adelaide Emily Overend (née Lawn)
- Children: Darren Lawn Overend (10 June 1944—16 January 2024)
- Parent(s): Harold Acheson Overend, Emily Trahair
- Buildings: Cairo Flats

Acheson Best Overend ARAIA ARIBA (15 October 1909 – 28 July 1977) was an Australian architect who worked mostly in Melbourne. He is known as one of the first architects in Victoria to be truly committed to Modernism (from the early 1930s), promoting the approach in articles in popular magazines and newspapers. He did not however design many notable independent works, the exception being the Cairo Flats in Fitzroy, built 1935–1936, a daringly Modernist design for Melbourne in the 1930s.

== Early life ==
Acheson Best Overend, generally known as Best, was born in Launceston, Tasmania on 15 October 1909. He was the son of Harold Acheson Overend, a Methodist minister and Emily Trahair, a businesswoman, and was educated at Wesley College, Melbourne.

== Early career ==
In 1926 he became an articled pupil in the practice of architect Hugh Vivian Taylor, who gradually became expert in acoustics. Partnering with Garnet Argyle Soilleux in 1928, the firm became Taylor & Soilleux, which soon specialised in the re-design of cinemas during the conversion to sound films after 1929. An unusual project at this time was the new 2AY Broadcasting Studio in Albury, completed in 1930. He also attended classes in architecture at Swinburne Technical College and later the evening classes at the University of Melbourne Architectural Atelier.

On completion of his studies, and in the face of the effects of the Great Depression, Overend moved to London in 1931, where he first worked for Raymond McGrath, a fellow Australian who was then working on the interiors of the BBC's Broadcasting House. Overend soon left in July 1931 to work for modernist architect and designer Wells Coates, where he worked as chief draftsman for over eighteen months when the office was developing the landmark Modernist Isokon Flats (completed in 1932), as well as the interiors of Broadcasting House.

In September 1931 he received a job offer from another noted Modernist Serge Chermayeff, but Wells did not agree. Overend passed his RIBA examinations in 1932 and joined the Architectural Association. The people he met and worked for, and the experiences he had overseas, rounded off his formal architectural education.

== 1930s ==
Overend returned to Melbourne in March 1933, and soon was elected as an Associate of the RVIA. He was then offered a partnership with his old firm, which became H. Vivian Taylor, Soilleux and Overend in May 1933. The firm soon moved on from re-designing cinemas to designing numerous new ones, amongst the most stylish and innovative of the many designed in the Art Deco style in the 1930s. Important examples included the Windsor Theatre, Windsor, 1936, the Padua Theatre, Brunswick, 1937, and the Regal Hartwell, cnr Camberwell and Toorak Roads, Camberwell, 1937, all now demolished. Other commissions included a series of service stations, and a series of houses. The Armytage House, Mont Albert Road, Balwyn, 1933, was noted by the Australian Home Beautiful for the simplicity of materials, and he sweeping concrete stair 'apparently unsupported' and expressed on exterior by a curved corner tower (demolished in 1980).

While working at Taylor & Soilleux, and drawing on influences from his time working under Wells Coats in London, he designed Cairo Flats in 1935, a two story block of flats in Melbourne, for which he is best known. Completed in 1936, they are arranged around a central garden, with many flats facing north, opened to the light through large windows and narrow balconies. Access to the upper level was via three daringly curved cantilevered staircases, and most apartments are studio flats with tightly planned kitchens and bathrooms, a type that was almost unheard of in Melbourne.

In 1937 he left the partnership to travel overseas again, sailing for Japan, but was diverted to Shanghai, where he found work with Lester Johnson & Morris, and worked on the design of an ultra-modern skyscraper for the Bund waterfront. The project was halted with the Japanese bombardment of the city in September, which Overend reported on extensively for the Australian press. He then travelled to London, working again for Wells Coates, but soon came back to Melbourne.

In May 1938, Overend opened his own firm, and his projects were mainly residential before World War II began.

In 1939, he began designing The Koornong School, located in Warrandyte, which offered a new type of education. Here he used flat or skillion roof light timber buildings, arranged organically in the bush setting.

That same year a design for an extremely modernist house for a site in North Balwyn was published in the Australian Home Beautiful. It was a two storey a rectangular prism, with continuous strip windows, and the living and dining areas separated by a curtain, but was never built.

In 1941, Overend designed the remarkable Carrington Park, Elizabeth Drive, Rosebud, for Leonard and Muriel Moran, of the Moran & Cato retail chain. The main floor of the house is elevated on a thin concrete platform, and consisted of an entirely glazed frontage that wrapped around a circular 'observation deck' at the north-west corner, with narrow 'catwalk' balcony with pipe handrails. The windows have since been altered.

Overend was also a prolific writer, contributing regularly to the column "Architecture and Property" in The Argus, Australian Home Beautiful, Table Talk, and a variety of other esteemed publications through the 1930s. With a forward-thinking approach, Overend consistently provided insightful commentary on innovations, highlighting their practical applications and advantages. His writings served as a valuable resource for designers and homeowners, offering them guidance and inspiration to adopt and implement these advancements in their projects. Through his writings, Overend played a significant role in shaping the discourse around modern design and construction practices in Australia.

In 1938 Overend was one of four architects appointed to the Victorian Architect's Panel advising the new Housing Commission of Victoria, where he advocated prefabricated housing solutions. The commission began experimenting with the technology by 1939, using it for most construction by the early 1960s.

== Military service ==
Overend served in the Royal Australian Air Force in World War II. He rose to the rank of Squadron Leader and was mentioned in dispatches.

== Later career ==
After the war, Overend remained on Housing Commission of Victoria's Architects' Panel, serving until 1955. He was particularly involved with the Ascot Estate, the largest undertaking of the Commission in the early post-war years.

Other notable designs of this period include the Graham Hotel on Swanston Street, built in time for the 1956 Melbourne Olympics. He also designed the arched-roofed 'Power House' sports pavilion on Albert Park Lake in 1965, and the P &O in Collins Street about the same time.

He was active in the profession, serving as President of the Victorian Chapter of Australian Institute of Architects, 1961–1963, and National President of the Australian Institute of Architects, 1967–1968.

He has been credited with the design for the Gippsland 'new town' of Churchill, announced in 1965.

Awards include an MBE in the 1977 New Years Honours for services to architecture, and more recently the Best Overend Award for Residential Architecture – Multiple Housing was named in his honour by the Victorian chapter of the Australian Institute of Architects.

== Notable works ==
=== Cairo Flats ===
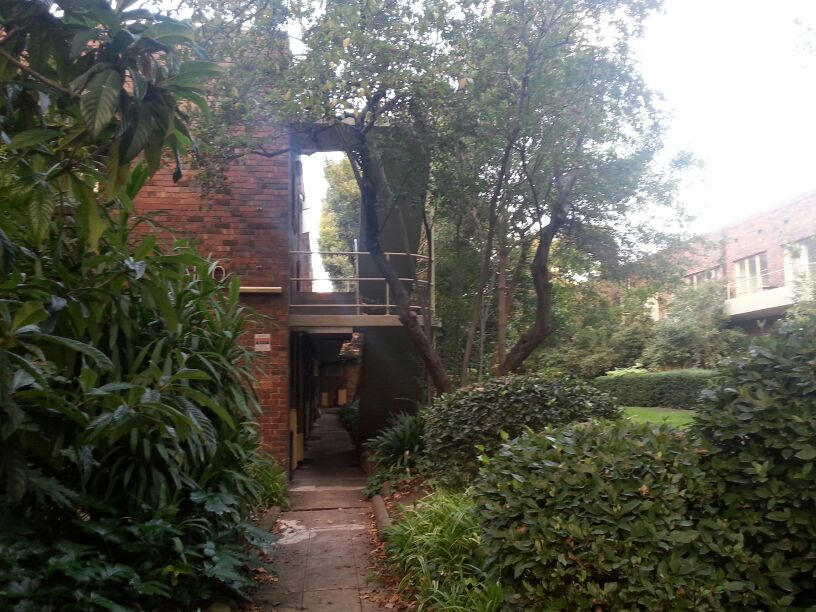
Cairo Flats in Fitzroy

In December 1935, Overend was asked to design a block of 40 flats in Nicholson Street, Fitzroy. He proposed 28 apartments, mainly studio flats with a single main room, as well as some with a separate bedroom. The development included a shop, a communal dining room, storage rooms, and an apartment for a manager. They were planned as a U-shaped block around a garden, with two main long wings facing north with small balconies and large window-walls allowing maximum sun penetration. The building was completed in December 1936. Cairo is a celebrated landmark of

=== Koornong School ===
The Koornong School was established in 1939 by Clive (1908–1977) and Janet (1911–1992) Nield, inspired by the natural and artistic milieu of Warrandyte. Despite the uncertainties posed by the war in Europe, the Nields envisioned a modern, self-governing school set amidst the eucalypt bushland along the Yarra River in Warrandyte North. Their aim was to create a free-thinking educational environment, with architecture reflecting their belief that learning spaces are integral to a child's development.

Best Overend was chosen to design buildings that aligned with this progressive educational concept. He used flat or skillion roof buildings, external studwork, and stone chimneys, all arranged organically within the bush setting by the river. Students actively contributed to the construction of key facilities, including an art studio, a swimming pool, and a dining room. However, wartime restrictions and financial mismanagement created significant challenges, culminating in the school's closure in 1947. The experiment ended amidst chronic financial difficulties following the Second World War. Tragically, many of the original buildings were destroyed by bushfires in 1962, but the skillion roofed headmasters house survives.

=== The Ascot Estate ===
The Ascot Estate was built on the site of the former Ascot Racecourse, which was compulsorily acquired in 1946, primarily intended to rehouse those displaced by the Commission's slum reclamation policies in inner city areas. By then Best Overend was deputy chairman of the Housing Commission of Victoria's Architects' Panel. Following a tour of Cairo Flats, Overend successfully persuaded his colleagues at the Commission's to shift focus to large-scale new developments that included efficient modern flats.

His firm was then commissioned to design both the layout of the estate – intended to provide the 'maximum amount of unencumbered open space on the site' – as well as the flats, and by 1948 the first tenants were moving in. The Type A blocks were the most creative, with a stepped plan and angled balconies, and a low pitched tiled roof, rather than flat as Overend had preferred.

By 1951, the estate ultimately consisted of more than 50 widely-spaced apartment blocks arranged informally across the site, with over 800 flats, and 50 freestanding houses, housing over 1000 residents. It became the first of many large-scale redevelopments, and remained the largest until the Commission adopted the construction of multiple high-rise flats on various inner city estates in the mid to late 1960s. Today, the Ascot Vale Estate stands as a landmark of post-war public housing, and the earliest section is heritage listed.
