= Garnet Argyle Soilleux =

Australian Architect

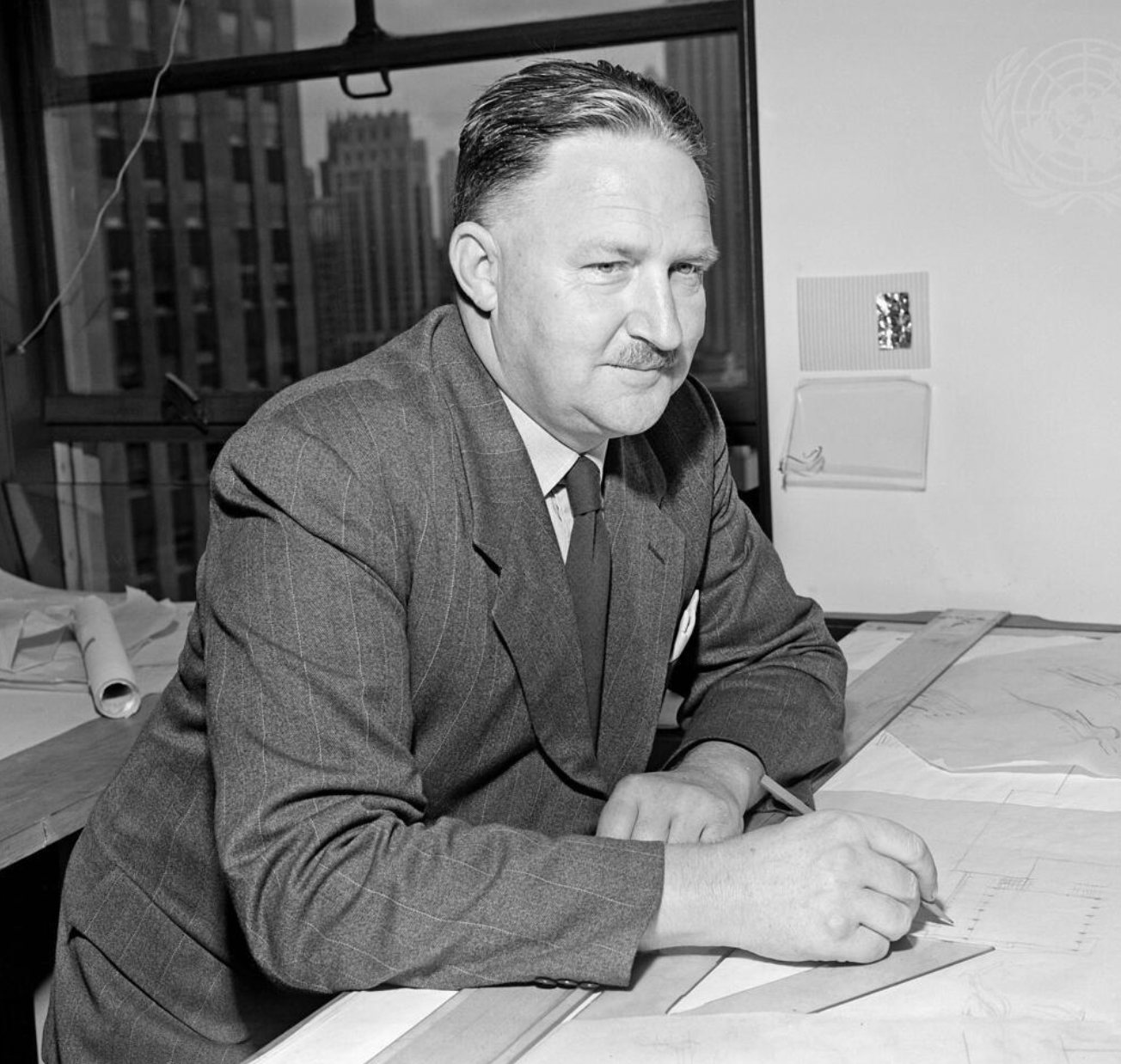
Planning of United Nations Headquarters 1947

Garnet Argyle Soilleux (14 September 1900 - 17 May 1959), commonly referred to as G. A. Soilleux (pronounced swoll-you), was a notable Australian architect. He was born at Burke House, Burke Road, in the Melbourne suburb of Hawthorn (later part of Camberwell), Victoria. He immigrated to San Francisco, San Francisco, California, United States in 1927. Soilleux married Ethel Victoria Crawford in 1937, in Victoria, Australia. He died on 17 May 1959, in Plymouth, Devon, England, United Kingdom, at the age of 58, and was buried in Kew Cemetery, Boroondara - Kew, Victoria, Australia.

== Career ==
After completing his architectural studies at the University of Melbourne in the early 1920s, he embarked on a successful career, initially forming a partnership with fellow architect and acoustic consultant Hugh Vivian Taylor in 1925. The firm, H. Vivian Taylor & Soilleux, became a leader in Australia, in theatre and cinema design and acoustics during the interwar period, contributing to the design or alteration of hundreds of theatres and cinemas. In 1933 Best Overend, another prominent Melbourne architect joined the firm, and for several years, the practice operated as Taylor, Soilleux & Overend. This partnership continued until 1937, when Overend departed, and the firm returned to its previous name.

When World War II broke out, Soilleux enlisted in the Royal Australian Air Force and served in Darwin during the first Japanese air raids in 1942. After the war ended and he transitioned back to civilian life, Soilleux embarked upon a significant post war career back in the field of architecture. Soilleux's designs emphasised functionality, simplicity, and the integration of new materials and construction techniques. He also joined the Commonwealth Department of Works and, in the same year, was appointed to the prestigious United Nations Board of Design, tasked with overseeing the design and construction of the United Nations Headquarters in New York. At the time of his death in 1959, Garnet Argyle Soilleux was serving as the Deputy Director of Works and Buildings in the Commonwealth Department of Works, marking the conclusion of a distinguished career in architecture and public service. Despite his significant contributions to architecture in Australia, Soilleux's name is not as widely recognized as some of his contemporaries.

== Personal ==
Father: Wor. Bro. Dr. Garnet Soilleux P.M. (14 May 1860 - 29 March 1935), who is the only son of the late Mr. Henry Garnet Soilleux (18 April 1828-25 May 1897), chief inspector of the Bank of Victoria. Born at Yackan-dandah, he was educated at Geelong College and for several years he managed a station in the Western district of Victoria. Then he entered the University of Melbourne and later in London be-came a member of the Royal College of Surgeons.

Mother: Miss Ethel May Argyle, of Kyneton, a cousin of Sir Stanley Argyle and Hon. Secretary of the Australian Ladies' Kennel Club

Brother: Mr. Henry Mamby Argyle Soilleux (2 December 1913 - 16 August 1946)

Sister: Miss Ethel Easter Soilleux, also known as Mrs T. B. Dodds (23 April 1905 - ?), who was a music teacher and published many articles related to architecture, and Nancie Lorne Soilleux (1910-1910)

Wife: Miss Ethel Victoria Crawford (1899 - 30 June 1955) was born in Castlemaine, Victoria, Australia as the daughter of Arthur Edward Crawford and Victoria. She married Garnet Argyle Soilleux in 1937, in Victoria, Australia. She died on 30 June 1955, in Mildura, Victoria, Australia, at the age of 56, and was buried in Kew Cemetery, Boroondara - Kew, Victoria, Australia.

== Hobby ==
Soilleux was a member of the crew of the 72ft. ketch Ticonderoga, scratch boat in a 500 mile yacht race from Newport (Rhode Island) to Annapolis (Maryland). Thirty nine yachts competed. The Ticonderoga was unplaced. Soilleux was a member of the Royal Yacht Club of Victoria.
