= Sawyers Valley Tavern =

Hotel in Sawyers Valley, Western Australia

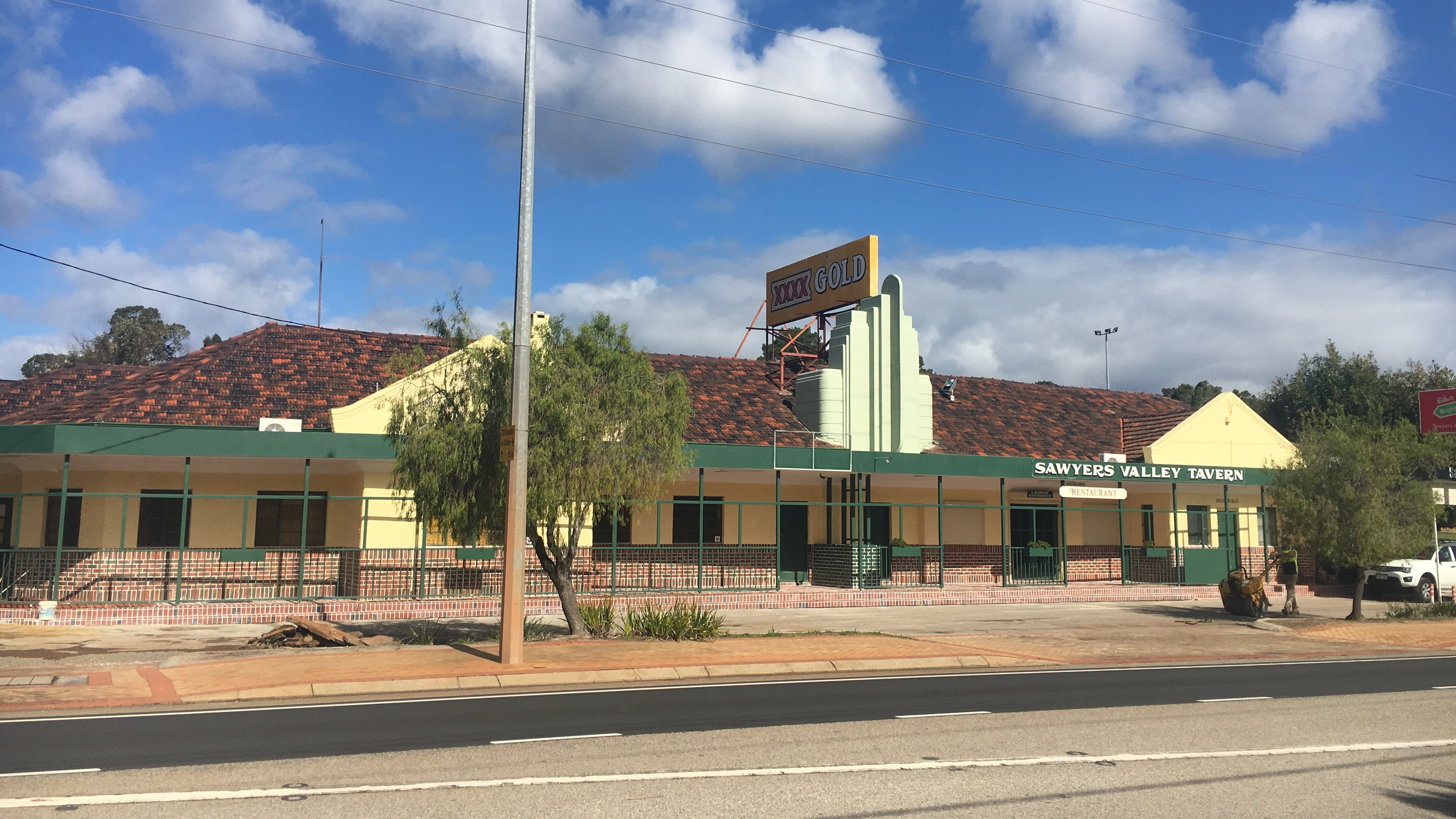
- Interactive map of the Sawyers Valley Tavern area
- Former names: Sawyers Valley Hotel

General information
- Type: Hotel
- Location: 10860 Great Eastern Highway, Sawyers Valley, Australia
- Coordinates: 31.9038°S 116.2047°E
- Opened: 1882

Website
- http://sawyersvalleytavern.com.au/

The Sawyers Valley Tavern was established in 1882 in Sawyers Valley, a hills suburb of Perth, Western Australia. It was originally called the Sawyers Valley Hotel before acquiring its current name.

== Lot Leather ==
Lot Leather arrived on the convict ship Clyde in 1863 after killing his sweetheart's lover. Leather began pit sawing at Sawyers Valley soon after, and in 1874 he purchased the land on which the Sawyers Valley Tavern is built. In the mid 1880s he built a store, next to his homestead on York Road, to serve the Eastern Railway construction workforce and the local sawyers.

== History ==
In 1882, Leather successfully applied for a colonial wine and beer licence, and the store was replaced with the Sawyers Valley Hotel. Even after the railway was finished, the hotel attracted locals from nearby sawmills.

The hotel and the adjacent recreation ground served as a local meeting place for mill workers, travellers, road boards, progress associations, historical societies and political rallies.

It also quickly became the gathering place for numerous sporting clubs, rifle clubs, cricket teams, cycling and motorcycle clubs. Sports meetings were promoted by subsequent publicans, including JH Kendall, who was licensee for 21 years. It was the focus of annual competitions in wood chopping, timber sawing, and tug-of-war, with teams from nearby mills and hotels in Chidlow and Mount Helena.

In 1937 the old timber hotel was demolished and the new single storey brick hotel, designed by William Bennett, was erected on the same site, featuring saloon and public bars, lounges, a dining room and ten bedrooms, kitchens and bathrooms.

During the Second World War the hotel featured in the local newspapers for incidents involving American servicemen. American soldiers and sailors were arrested for being drunk and fighting, and their girlfriends arrested for living "idle and disorderly lives" and prostitution.

Over time licensees of the hotel have included Thomas Stone, Walter Pearce, William Riley, Fred Jacoby, Mary Kelly, and Clare Firth.

== Architectural character ==
The single storey Sawyers Valley Tavern is one of a few Art Deco style buildings in the shire other than some minor elements on several residence. The overall character of the building retains much of its original form and is simply detailed. The principle focus of Art Deco decoration is the projection through the tiled roof at the main entry of a tall, stepped, rounded and streamline rendered parapet element.

== Heritage value ==
The Sawyers Valley Tavern has high social significance for the local community. The building's Art Deco character is unique in the Shire of Mundaring. Sitting opposite the Railway Reserve Heritage Trail, the site also has historic significance as the location of Lot Leather's former store and hotel.

In 2016 the Sawyers Valley Tavern was listed on Western Australia's Heritage Register for the contribution made by the place to Western Australia's cultural heritage.
