= Walsh's Building =

Building in Perth, Western Australia

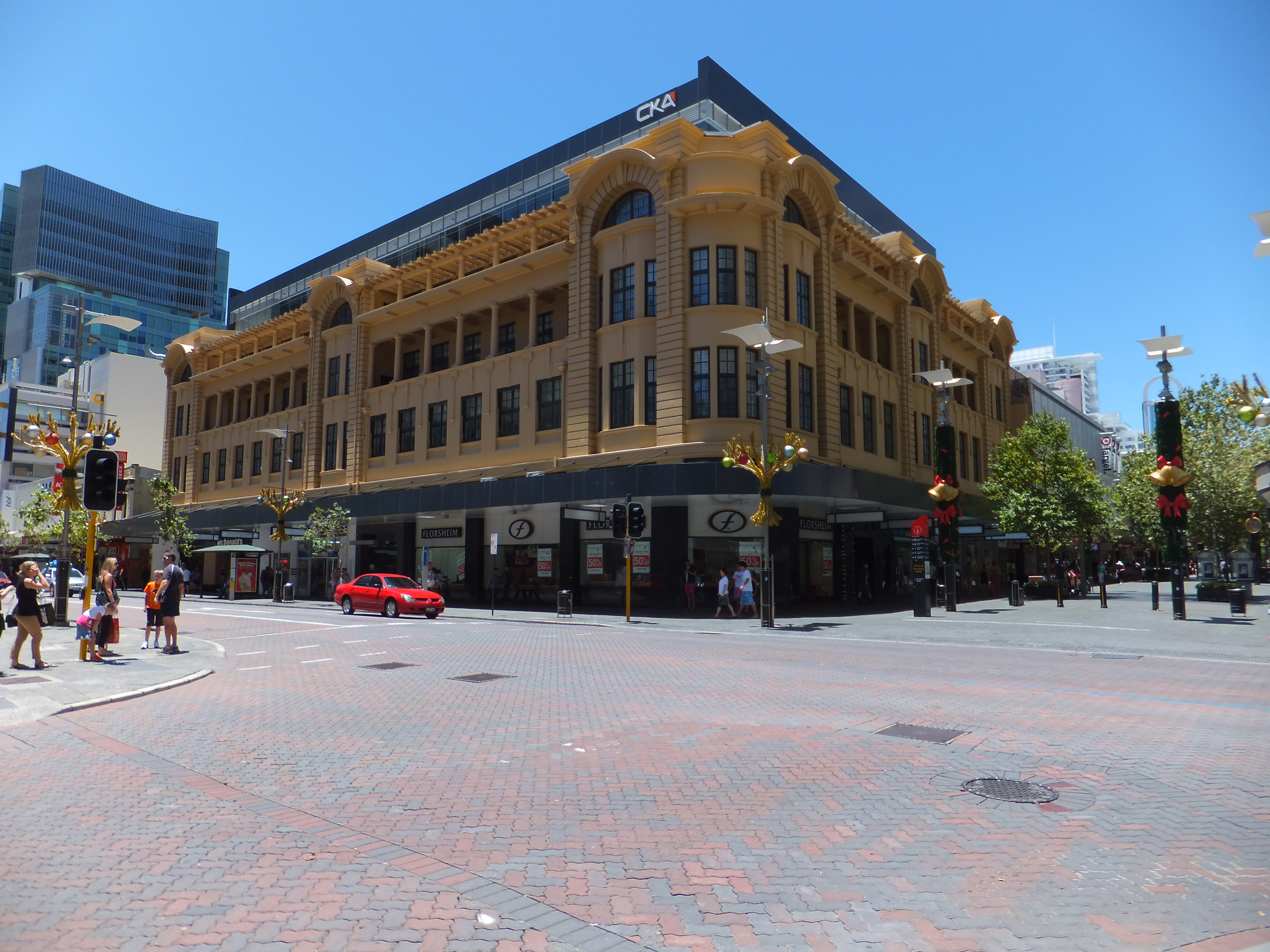
- The Walsh's Building after the 2010–12 renovation
- Interactive map of the Walsh's Building area
- Alternative names: Economic Store Building

General information
- Type: Retail; Office
- Architectural style: Art Deco
- Location: Perth, Western Australia, 726 Hay Street; 88 William Street
- Coordinates: 31.9532°S 115.8575°E
- Current tenants: McDonald's; Florsheim
- Construction started: 1922; 104 years ago
- Completed: 1923; 103 years ago
- Renovated: 2011; 15 years ago
- Cost: £A 80,000 (equivalent to A$7.3M in 2022)
- Renovation cost: A$15M
- Owner: Winston Holdings Pty Ltd; Ayoman Pty Ltd
- Landlord: CB Richard Ellis

Technical details
- Floor count: 6

Design and construction
- Architect: Talbot Hobbs
- Main contractor: C. W. Arnott

Renovating team
- Architect: Palassis Architects
- Renovating firm: Diploma Group

Walsh's Building formerly known as the Economic Store Building is a building in Perth, Western Australia. It was designed by Talbot Hobbs.

== Site ==
The building is located on the corner of Hay Street and William Street, Perth. It stands opposite the Gledden Building and Wesley Church, two other heritage listed buildings on this corner. The current building replaced the previous Economic Store building that had been destroyed by fire in 1921.

== Architecture ==
The building was designed in the Inter-war Art Deco style by Talbot Hobbs, an architect responsible for a number of buildings in the Perth Central Business District.

== Construction ==
Construction on the site began in 1922 and was complete by early 1923. The lead contractor was C. W. Arnott. In late 2012 a A$15-million renovation of the building was completed.

== Usage ==
The first major tenant in the building was the Economic Store, of which the Perth Mayor Sir William Lathlain was the proprietor.

The building took on its current name when the Walsh's Menswear store opened on the ground level.

The basement of the building was used as a food court until a 2007 fire caused extensive damage, forcing its closure.

It was classified by the National Trust of Western Australia in 1978.
