= Blue Waters, Perth =

Private residence in Como, Western Australia

Coordinates: 32°00′08″S 115°51′41″E

Blue Waters
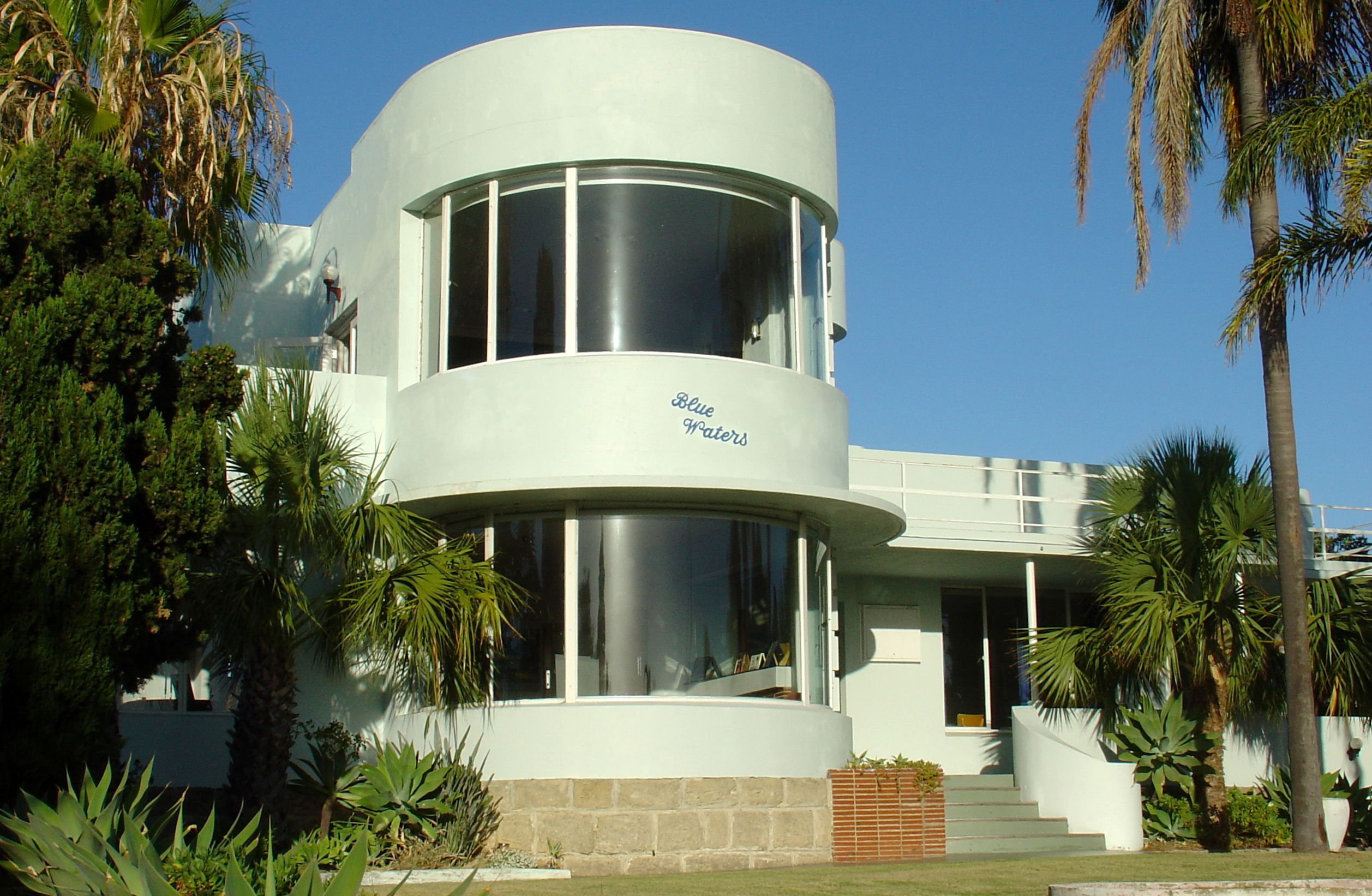
- Interactive map of the Blue Waters area

General information
- Architectural style: Inter-War Art Deco
- Location: Western Australia, 426 Canning Highway, Como, Australia
- Opened: 1954
- Renovated: 2006
- Owner: David Cavanagh

Design and construction
- Architect: Keith D'Alton

Blue Waters is a historic private residence located on Canning Highway in Como, Western Australia. The house was built in 1954 by Mabel and Keith Perron (the brother of Stan Perron). Designed as a "party palace", it became the hub of the Perth social scene for many years.

== History ==
Shortly before the Second World War, the Perrons were inspired by a magazine illustration of a Florida Art Deco house design. Construction of the 1930s design was delayed until 1954 because of wartime restrictions. Building materials were rationed during the war, and the design of Blue Waters involved a greater quantity of brickwork and glass than the quotas allowed. To overcome the handicap, Keith Perron established a brickworks. Other technical challenges could not be met in Australia, the curved glass windows and frames having to be shipped from the U.K.

The house became both a social hub and a landmark outside which tour buses would regularly pause. On a return trip from Darwin, the Perrons' two young sons brought back two baby crocodiles in a shoe box, and set up a small pond in the backyard for them. One was later donated to the Perth Zoo after venturing outside the property. Daughter Judith had a modelling career and used the house for photographic shoots. A cousin, Marshall Perron lived there for a while as a young man before establishing himself as a Northern Territory politician and chief minister.

In 1961 the house, complete with its original furniture, was sold to Joy and Eric Lillingston for £A 12,500, equivalent to A$407,000 in 2022. In 1965, it was bought by a bookmaker named Botica, and later by a Mr Sowden who was the deputy mayor of Fremantle. In the 1970s, the Norvillas family acquired it and stayed for 35 years before selling in 2006 to David Cavanagh. Cavanagh contacted the original owners for their advice in restoring the property to its original condition.

The house was listed on the Municipal Heritage Inventory of the City of South Perth in December 1994, affording it a "high level of protection" under the City of South Perth Town Planning Scheme. The statement of significance for the house's registration noted its "aesthetic, representative and rarity cultural heritage significance".

The house has been featured in a number of films, including The Reckoning, a 2014 crime thriller, which starred Jonathan LaPaglia, Luke Hemsworth and Viva Bianca.

== Design ==
The building was designed by architect Keith D'Alton, and has featured in national reference books on Australian architecture for its interwar design features and its distinctive curved glass windows.
