= Rivoli Cinemas =

Heritage-listed cinema in Melbourne, Australia

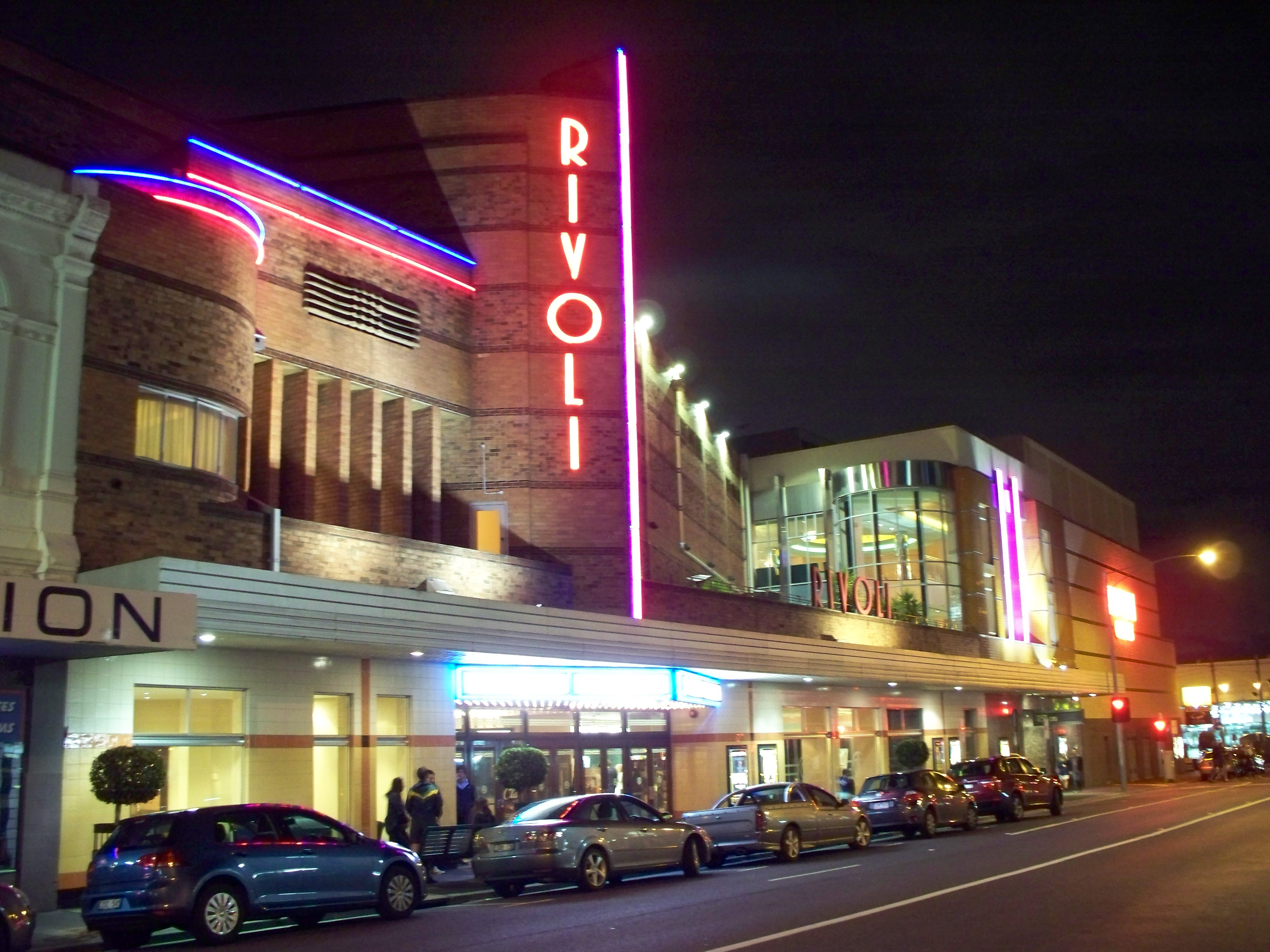
- The eight-screen free-standing Rivoli Cinemas, operating within the Village Cinemas chain

- Location of the cinema in Greater Metropolitan Melbourne
- Interactive map of Rivoli Cinemas
- Former names: Rivoli Theatre
- Location: 200 Camberwell Road, Hawthorn East, Melbourne, Victoria, Australia
- Coordinates: 37°49′50″S 145°03′19″E
- Operator: Village Cinemas
- Capacity: 1,640 (1940–1999); 1,550 (since 2000)
- Type: Multiplex
- Screens: 1 (1940–1968); 2 (1968–1999); 8 (since 2000)

Construction
- Opened: 11 October 1940; 86 years ago
- Renovated: 2000
- Architectural style: Streamline Moderne
- Architect: H. Vivian Taylor & Soilleux
- Project manager: Robert McGleish

Website
- villagecinemas.com.au
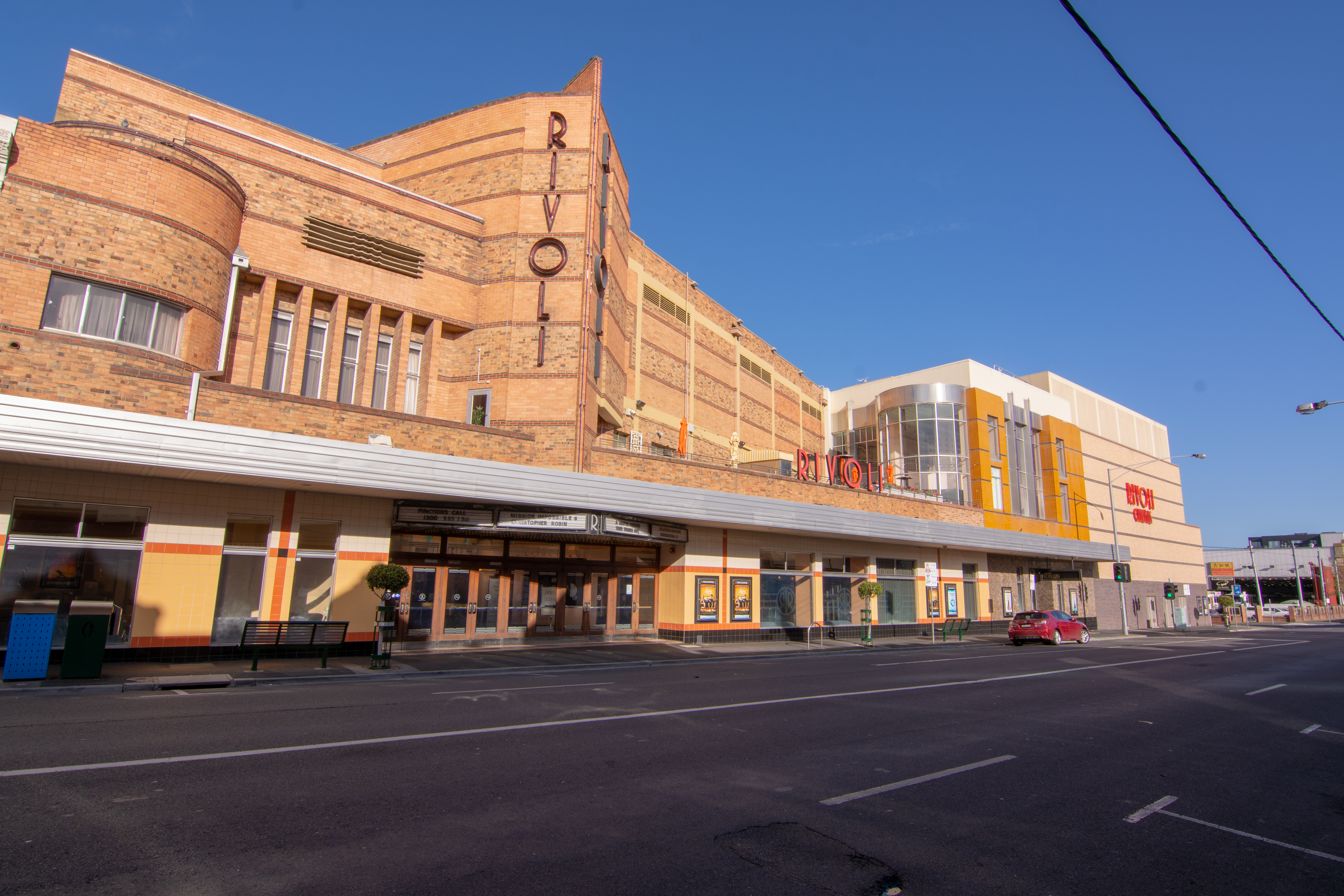
- The cinema in 2018

Victorian Heritage Register
- Official name: Rivoli Theatre
- Type: Registered place
- Designated: 10 February 2005
- Reference no.: VHR H1524
- Heritage overlay no.: HO482
- Category: Recreation and Entertainment

The Rivoli Cinemas, also known as Rivoli Theatre and New Rivoli Theatre, is an eight-screen multiplex, located at 200 Camberwell Road in Hawthorn East, an inner eastern suburb of Melbourne, in Victoria, Australia. Noted for its Streamline Moderne architecture, the cinema was built in 1940, and reopened as a multiplex in 2000 following a renovation and expansion.

The Rivoli Theatre was added to the Victorian Heritage Register on 10 February 2005 in recognition of its architectural, historical, and social significance.

== History of the cinema ==
Rivoli Cinemas opened on 11 October 1940, with a screening of French Without Tears, starring Ray Milland. At the time, the cinema had a capacity of 1,644 seats, of which 1,004 were in the stalls and 640 were in the dress circle.

The cinema replaced a 1921 theatre of the same name, that was located in Burke Road and designed by Frank Richardson. Robert McGleish, a notable figure in the Melbourne cinema scene of the time and manager of the first Rivoli, was responsible for the new cinema's construction and it was designed by architects H. Vivian Taylor & Soilleux.

In 1968, it was the first cinema in Australia to be converted to twin auditoriums, enabling cinema goers to choose which movie to watch. The main auditorium was split with the balcony becoming the main cinema, retaining the elaborate plasterwork, while the smaller cinema created in the stalls area did not.

This action may have allowed the cinema to weather the post-war decline into the 1990s when cinema going regained popularity. An extensive $16 million restoration and expansion began in 1999, including a large addition on the west side of the building to incorporate six new screens, with capacity reduced to 1,550 seats following the renovation.

== Architecture ==
The Rivoli Cinemas is an excellent example of Streamline Moderne, also known as Art Moderne, the late 1930s version of Art Deco architecture, with impressive external polychrome brickwork and internal plasterwork. It is the only intact surviving example in Victoria of the work of cinema specialist architects H. Vivian Taylor and Soilleaux, a practice responsible for the architecture or acoustics of more than 500 cinemas and theatres in Australia.

The exterior façade features distinctive horizontally-banded brickwork in shades of pink and oatmeal and a vertical fin. To the east is a curved-walled balcony, and the west angle incorporates a roof garden. The ground level walls around the doors originally featured cream and orange ceramic tiles, lost during succeeding alterations, and reinstated in 1999–2000, along with the Art Deco-style signage on the fin.

The interior of the cinema was the height of luxury when it opened, featuring a circular ticket hall on the lower level and dramatic circular staircase up to a lounge above, also an access point for the roof garden. The two-level auditorium had plaster walls and ceiling, constructed independently of the structure and considered to be an innovation. Grilles were added for decoration and to house acoustics, with lighting largely concealed behind plasterwork. Renovation work during 1999 and 2000 added substantial new areas to the building and retained the original plasterwork in the largely untouched upper auditorium. The foyers, circular staircase, and upper lounge are also largely original.

Due to the significance of the cinema, restoration was undertaken in consultation with Heritage Victoria and the Melbourne-based Art Deco & Modernism Society (ADMS) to ensure the fabric and quality of the original architecture was maintained.

== Cinema ghosts ==
Rivoli Cinemas was cited in an ABC science feature in 2003 on research into the existence or otherwise of ghosts. According to cinema staff, several spirits inhabited the building, including a man in Row P of Cinema One.

== See also ==
- Architecture of Melbourne
- List of theatres in Melbourne
- List of places on the Victorian Heritage Register in the City of Boroondara
