= Raffles Hotel, Perth =

Raffles Hotel
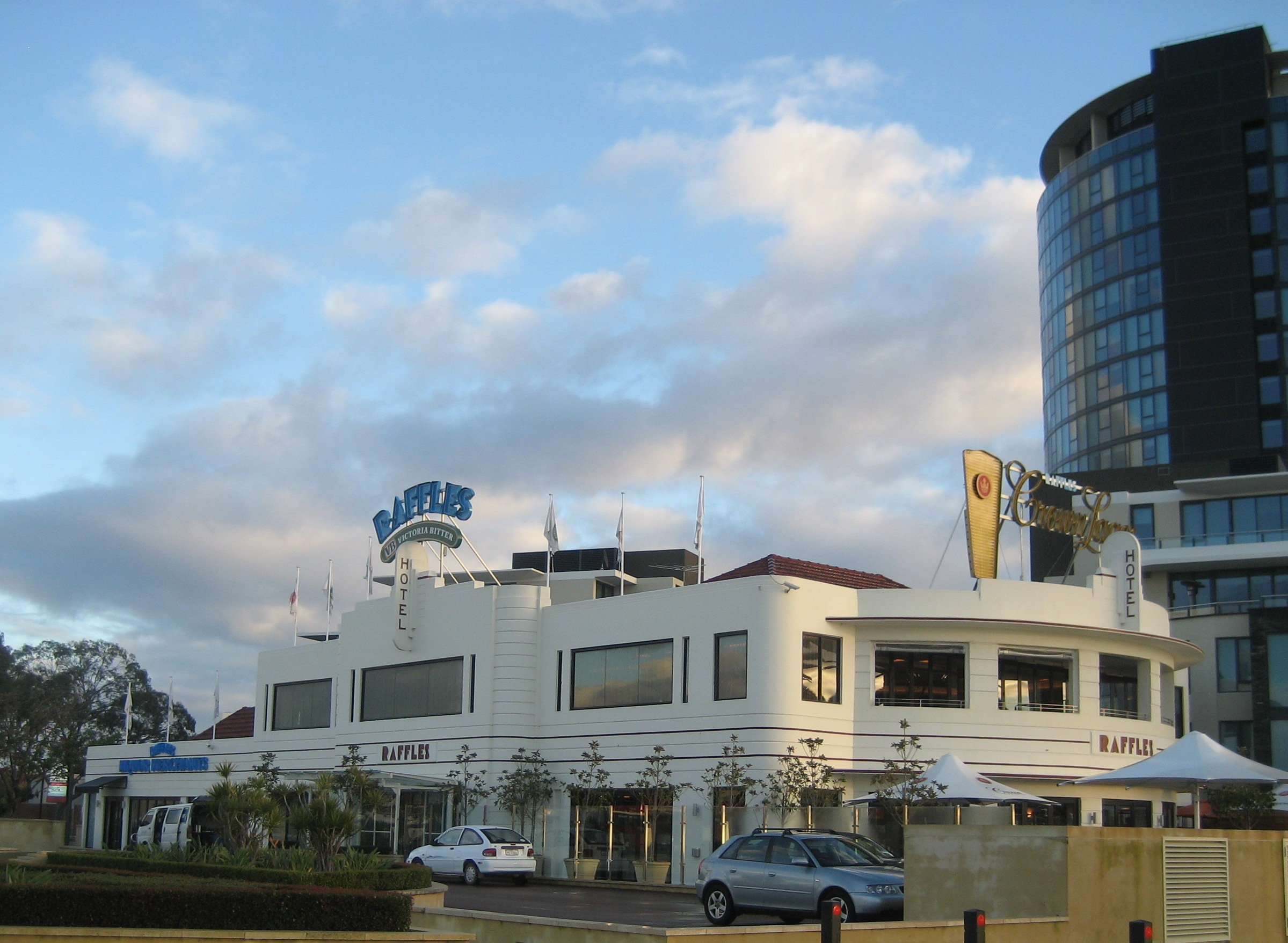
- The Raffles Hotel in Applecross, Perth
- Interactive map of the Raffles Hotel area

General information
- Type: Hotel
- Architectural style: Inter-War Functionalist/Art-deco
- Location: Applecross, Western Australia
- Coordinates: 32°00′39″S 115°51′06″E
- Completed: 1896
- Renovated: 1937; 2007; 2015

Technical details
- Floor count: 2

Renovating team
- Architect: William G. Bennett

Western Australia Heritage Register
- Designated: 22 January 2002
- Reference no.: 1544

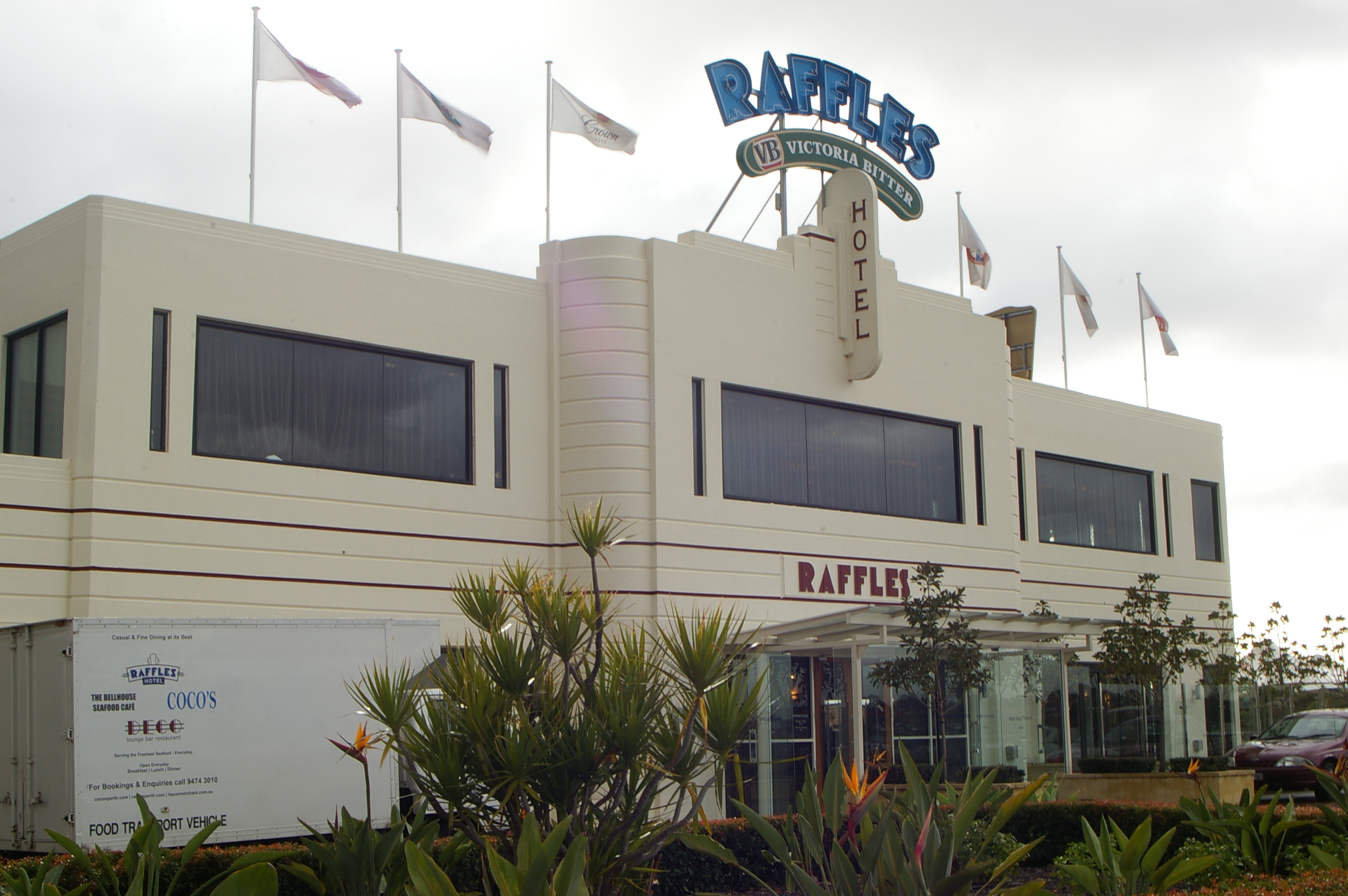
The Raffles Hotel in Applecross

Raffles Hotel is located at the corner of Canning Highway and Canning Beach Road in the Perth, Western Australia suburb of Applecross, Western Australia. It is a two-storey hotel designed in the Inter-War Functionalist style and is one of the few examples of a hotel in this style surviving in the Perth metropolitan area. Earlier named the Canning Bridge Hotel, it has operated continuously as a licensed hotel since at least 1896. For over 50 years until 2002, it was owned by Australian nightclub owner and property developer Abe Saffron, whose plan to demolish the hotel was successfully opposed by the Art Deco Society of Western Australia in a ten-year campaign.

== History ==
The location of Canning Bridge on the road from Fremantle to Perth and Guildford made it a suitable location for accommodation and refreshments. In January 1850 the first Canning Bridge was constructed and soon after, on 4 May, a liquor licence was granted to a Samuel Duffield, owner of the Bridge Inn of Canning. It is not known where that inn was located but it was possibly a predecessor of the 1896 Canning Bridge Hotel, near the bridge on its western (Applecross) side – which was remodelled in 1937 as the present Raffles Hotel.

The Canning Bridge Hotel was a single-storey structure with a high, gabled roof. Beside it stood a pavilion with a dance hall on the upper floor and refreshment rooms below. The hotel provided a venue for many social and sporting groups such as the W.A. Hunt Club. The hotel was also used by the East Fremantle District Road Board for its first council meeting on 22 March 1901.

This building was extensively upgraded in 1937, with a distinctive Art Deco facade designed by architect William G. Bennett, to coincide with the construction of the current bridge and the upgrading of Canning Highway. The building was renamed the Raffles Hotel after the renowned Raffles Hotel in Singapore. The facade, and in particular the nature and placement of the forward extension of the hotel, reveals a conscious effort on the part of the architect to respect the importance of the newly constructed Applecross District Hall to the community and its streetscape value.

William Bennett had been a partner in the firm Eales Cohen & Bennett, which was responsible for the Applecross District Hall. He left the firm in 1935. Other significant works by Bennett include the Plaza Theatre and Arcade in central Perth (1936–7), the Kalgoorlie Olympic Pool (1938), the Chalet at Araluen and other structures (1937), and the Beaucott Buildings (c. 1937) in Beaufort Street.

The hotel was reconstructed at a cost of approximately £A 10,000. One of its features was a biergarten, which is believed to be the first of its kind in Australia. The garden was situated on the northern boundary of the hotel property.

Raffles Hotel reveals the new design aesthetic then in vogue of streamlined functional forms with an emphasis on horizontal lines admirably suited to the site. Its design took good advantage of the riverside location. The main feature is the large curved loggias on both floors provided on the river frontage. From there, extensive views of the Swan and Canning Rivers are available. The exterior of the hotel was described as rendered in cream cement with sunk rustication emphasising the horizontal lines on the main building. The pitched roof over the first-storey section was covered in colour-blend tiles, and green-painted circular steps led to the entrances of the hotel from the Canning Highway frontage.

Apart from its status as "the epitome" of Perth's social scene in the 1940s and 1950s, the Raffles later became noted for its animated neon billboards advertising beer. In 1959 a separate motor lodge, consisting of a double-storey building of twenty rooms, was constructed at the rear of the main hotel building. According to the local press this new development met a public demand for motels offering service to the family man. Other changes to the hotel were made in 1985, when apparently a fire caused damage to the first floor which required a new metal-deck roof to replace the former pitched tiled roof. A nightclub, The Raffs, was also constructed on the eastern (river) side of the building, and a drive-in bottle shop built on the Canning Bridge Road frontage. During the 1970s and 1980s the Raffles was notable for its live music, attracting the most popular local and interstate acts.

The Raffles Hotel was the favourite pub of AC/DC singer Bon Scott.

== Current uses ==
In 2002, the site was sold to the construction company Multiplex, which proceeded to redevelop the site into a 17-storey apartment tower. As part of the planning permissions, the Art Deco 1939 building was retained and renovated.

== Heritage value ==
The hotel was listed in the City of Melville's Municipal Heritage Inventory (which was adopted 19 December 1994) and classified by the National Trust of Western Australia on 3 July 1995. It received an interim listing on the State Register of Heritage Places on 16 March 2001, was nominated for the Register of the National Estate on 28 September 2001, and received a permanent registration on the State Register on 22 January 2002.
