= P&O Building (Perth) =

Heritage-listed building in Perth, Western Australia

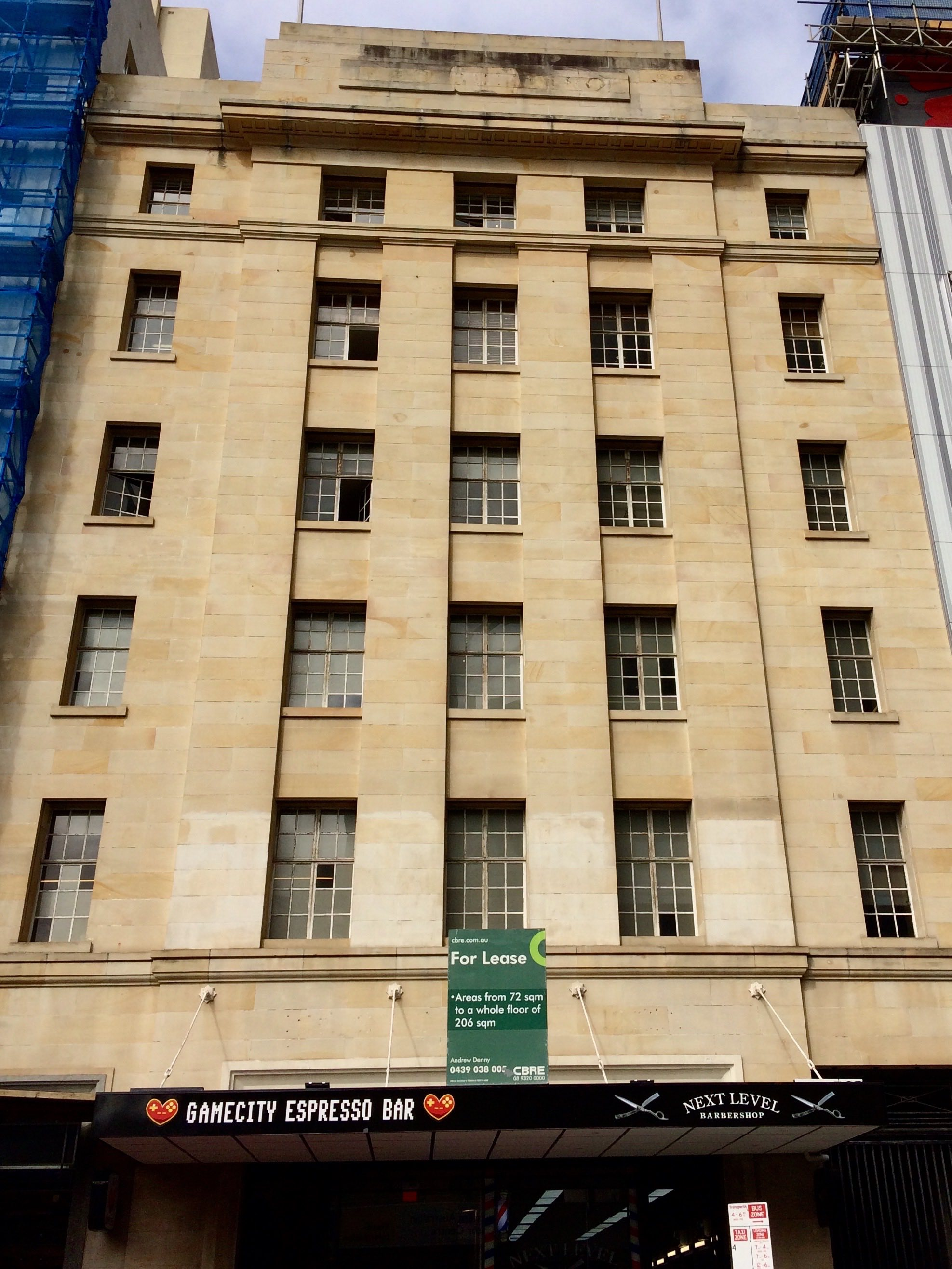
- Interactive map of the P&O Building area
- Alternative names: Orient Lines Building; Malaysian Airlines Building

General information
- Architectural style: Inter-war functionalist
- Location: 56-60 William Street, Perth, Australia
- Coordinates: 31.95387°S 115.85706°E
- Current tenants: Malaysia Airlines
- Completed: 1930
- Inaugurated: 16 September 1930
- Renovated: 1991
- Cost: £A 41,073 (equivalent to A$3.8M in 2022)
- Client: Orient Steam Navigation Company

Technical details
- Floor count: 7

Design and construction
- Architect: Waldie Forbes
- Architecture firm: Hobbs, Smith & Forbes
- Main contractor: E. Allwood

Western Australia Heritage Register
- Type: State Registered Place
- Designated: 22 November 2005
- Reference no.: 4587

The P&O Building is a heritage-listed building in Perth, Western Australia.

== Site history ==
The site of the building formerly housed three separate shops at 56, 58 and 60 William Street. It was built to house the Orient Steam Navigation Company that later became part of P&O. It was officially opened by William Campion, the Governor of Western Australia, on 16 September 1930.

== Architecture ==
It is a seven-storey steel framed office building, clad in Donnybrook stone and rendered brick. It was designed in the Inter-war Functionalist style by Waldie Forbes of the Hobbs Smith & Forbes architecture firm, at a cost of £A 41,073, equivalent to A$3.8 million in 2022.
