= William G. Bennett (architect) =

Australian architect (1896–1977)

William Bennett
- Born: William Garnsworthy Bennett; 22 May 1896; Linton, Victoria, Australia
- Died: 25 November 1977 (aged 81); Perth, Western Australia
- Occupation: Architect

William Garnsworthy Bennett (22 May 1896 – 25 November 1977) was a Western Australian architect, well known for his Art Deco and Inter-War Functionalist style of civic, commercial and domestic buildings, including the Lord Forrest Olympic Pool in Kalgoorlie, the Beverley Town Hall, the Raffles Hotel and Plaza Theatre and Arcade in Perth.

Bennett was born in Victoria in 1896, and came to Western Australia with his family in 1910. He studied architectural drafting at Perth Technical School and joined the Young Australia League. In 1920, he was articled to architect F. J. Coote and, four years later, became the first locally trained architect to pass the Architect’s Board of Examination. He was awarded the first Bronze Medal of the Royal Australian Institute of Architects (WA) the following year, and served as the Institute’s secretary from 1924–29. In 1931, he became the first West Australian architect to become an Associate (Overseas) Member of the Royal Institute of British Architects. Bennett was the first West Australian to hold the positions of president of the Royal Australian Institute of Architects, and president of the Royal Australian Planning Institute.

Before setting up practice on his own in 1936, William Bennett was in charge of the drawing office at Eales and Cohen, where he worked with art deco theatre designer, William T. Leighton. Among the work that passed through William Bennett’s office in the late 1930s were: the Dalkeith and Nedlands tennis clubs; Lord Forrest Olympic Pool, Kalgoorlie, Western Australia; infant health centres at Dalkeith, Manjimup and Nedlands; the Scarborough, Ocean Beach, Majestic and Raffles hotels in Perth, Checkers Hotel Bullsbrook, Sawyers Valley Tavern and a hotel in Beverley; Plaza Theatre and Arcade in the Hay Street Mall, and the Regal Theatre in Subiaco with William Leighton; Applecross town hall, the Masonic Temple, Nedlands; the Young Australia League headquarters building in Murray Street, a number of private houses in suburbs such as Dalkeith, Cottesloe and South Perth; and over a dozen buildings and structures at Araluen. Bennett was also responsible for the refurbishment of Bunbury’s Rose Hotel, the Mount Barker Hotel, and Perth Motor House with Powell, Cameron and Chisholm.

== Sources ==
- Geneve, Vyonne ‘Artist of the Month: William G Bennett’, Art Deco Society of WA Newsletter, Vol. 5 No. 4 July/Aug, 1992, pp. 10–11.
- William G. Bennett, architect : Articles and notes volume 5, number, December 1992-January 1993, p. 11

== Notable buildings ==
- Plaza Theatre and Arcade
- Raffles Hotel, Perth
- Regal Theatre, Subiaco
- Sawyers Valley Tavern
