= Be'eri Printers =

Printing house in Negev, Israel

- Type: Limited partnership
- Industry: Printing
- Founded: 1950; 76 years ago
- Headquarters: Be'eri, Israel
- Subsidiaries: Messer, Be'eri Packaging
- Website: www.beeriprint.co.il

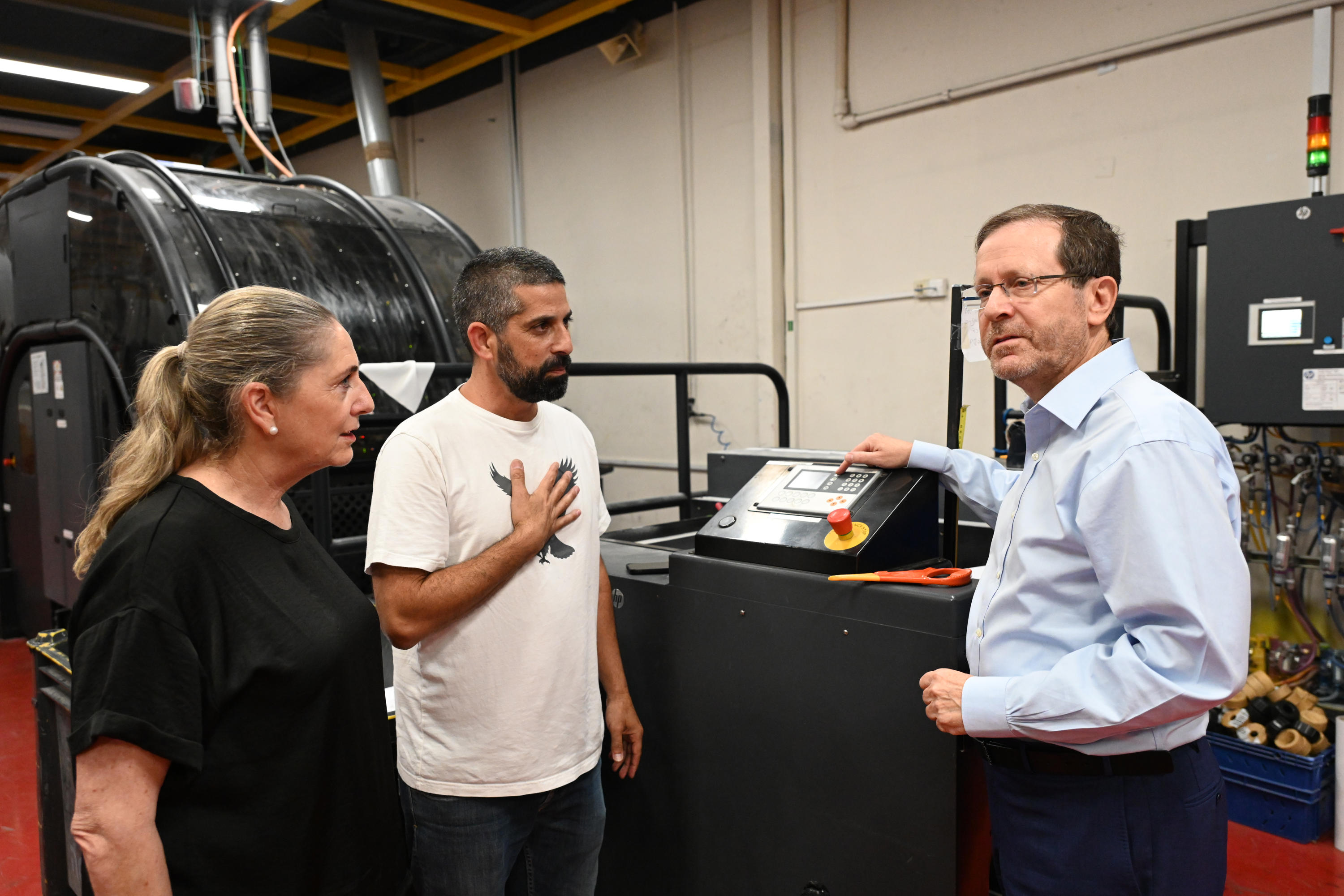
The President of the State of Israel Isaac Herzog, next to his wife Michal and the CEO of Be'eri print, at the re-opening of the print, after the massacre that happened in the kibbutz, in October 2023

Be'eri Printers (In Hebrew: דפוס בארי Dfus Be'eri) is a printing house in the kibbutz of Be'eri in the Negev. The printing house is the kibbutz's main source of income.

== History ==
The printing house was founded in 1950, four years after the founding of the kibbutz and two years after the establishment of the state, in one of the kibbutz's abandoned buildings.

Eight years later, the printing house moved to its current location. It is the first printing house in the Negev. Since then, it has become one of the leading printing houses in Israel.

The printing house specializes in printing using advanced technologies, including digital printing, and creating documents that are safe from counterfeiting, including checkbooks, shopping vouchers and official certificates, as well as credit cards.

Since 1992, Be'eri Printers has been exclusively responsible for printing Israeli driver's licenses. The printing house also serves customers who send a large volume of mail, such as banks and credit card companies, but this area of activity has declined with the transition to electronic mail. The subsidiary "Messer" deals with the distribution of bulk mail to recipients.

In 1986, Beeri Printers and its employees were awarded the Kaplan Prize for the development of the "envelopee", a patented invention that combines the letter and the envelope into a single sheet.

The company's revenues were estimated at hundreds of millions of shekels per year.

The 2023 Hamas attack on Israel on October 7, 2023, in which at least 85 residents of Be'eri were murdered and other residents were evacuated, led to a temporary shutdown of the place, which was not physically damaged.

The print house returned to partial operation on October 15.
