= Crater Reserve =

Crater Reserve may refer to:

- Be'eri Crater Reserve, Israel
- Luba Crater Scientific Reserve, Equatorial Guinea
- Ngorongoro Crater Reserve, Tanzania
- Tswaing Crater Reserve, Gauteng, South Africa

== See also ==
- Henbury Meteorites Conservation Reserve
- Craters of the Moon National Monument and Preserve
