= Be'eri Forest =

Forest in Israel

Coordinates: 31.439°N 34.471°E

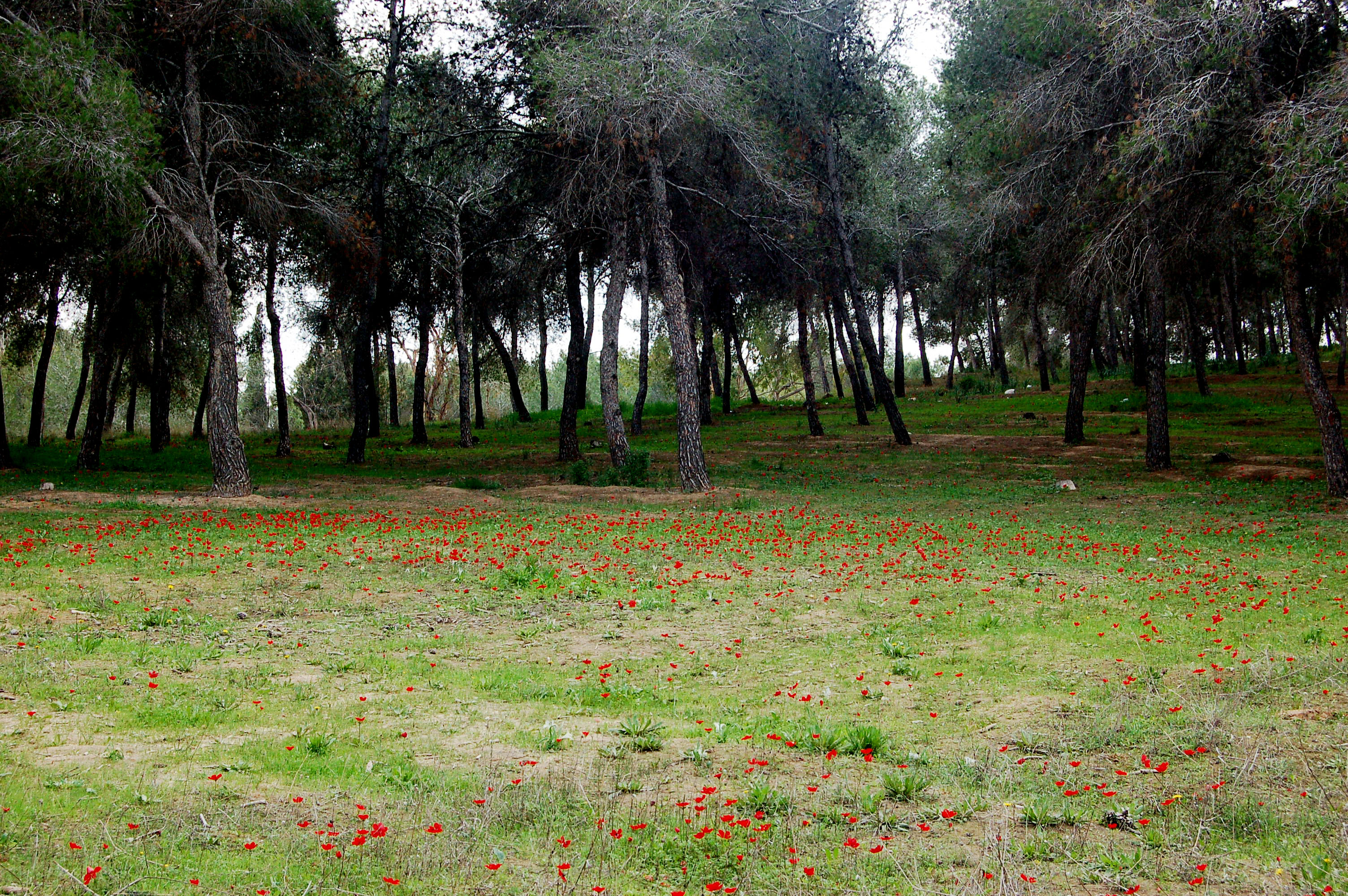
Be'eri Forest

The Be'eri Forest (Hebrew: יער בארי) of area about 11,000 dunams is located in the western Negev, within the Eshkol Regional Council area. It was planted by the pioneers of the kibbutz Be'eri.

The forest has a diverse array of tree types, encompassing conifers, fruit-bearing trees, and deciduous broad-leaved trees. During winter and spring time it is covered with clusters of anemones, orchids, tulips, asphodels and many other flowers.

On May 2, 2018, the forest was severely damaged by a forest fire that was ignited by an incendiary kite sent by Hamas from Gaza.

== Landmarks ==
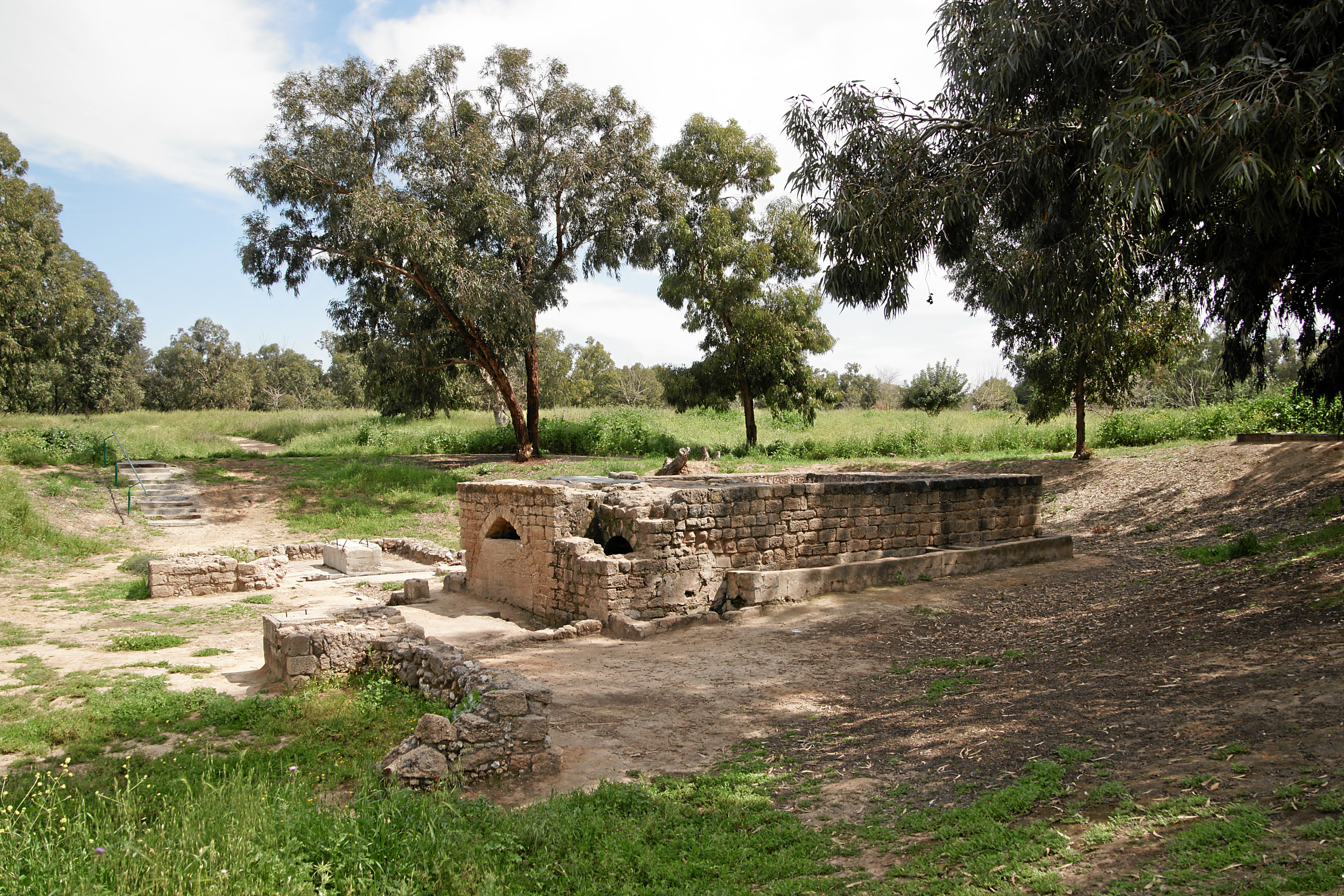
Beer Forest water wheel

- Be'eri Badlands Nature Reserve
- ANZAC Memorial ( Media related to Anzac Memorial (Israel) at Wikimedia Commons)
- Abandoned Be'ery Sulphur Quarry ( Media related to Sulfur Quarry of Be'eri at Wikimedia Commons)
- Beeri IDF Temporary Military Cemetery ( Media related to Beeri IDF Temporary Military Cemetery at Wikimedia Commons)

Other tourist attractions include water cisterns and wells from the Byzantine period and extensive ammunition depots from the British Mandate period.

During the winter season a major attraction of the area is the anemone blooming, which peaks on the break of January/February (Darom Adom). Luckily, the anemones were not damaged during the Palestinian airborne arson attacks, from which other area of the forest, including the Be'eri Badlands, heavily suffered.
