= Sofie Berzon MacKie =

Israeli visual artist, curator and director

- סופי ברזון מקאי
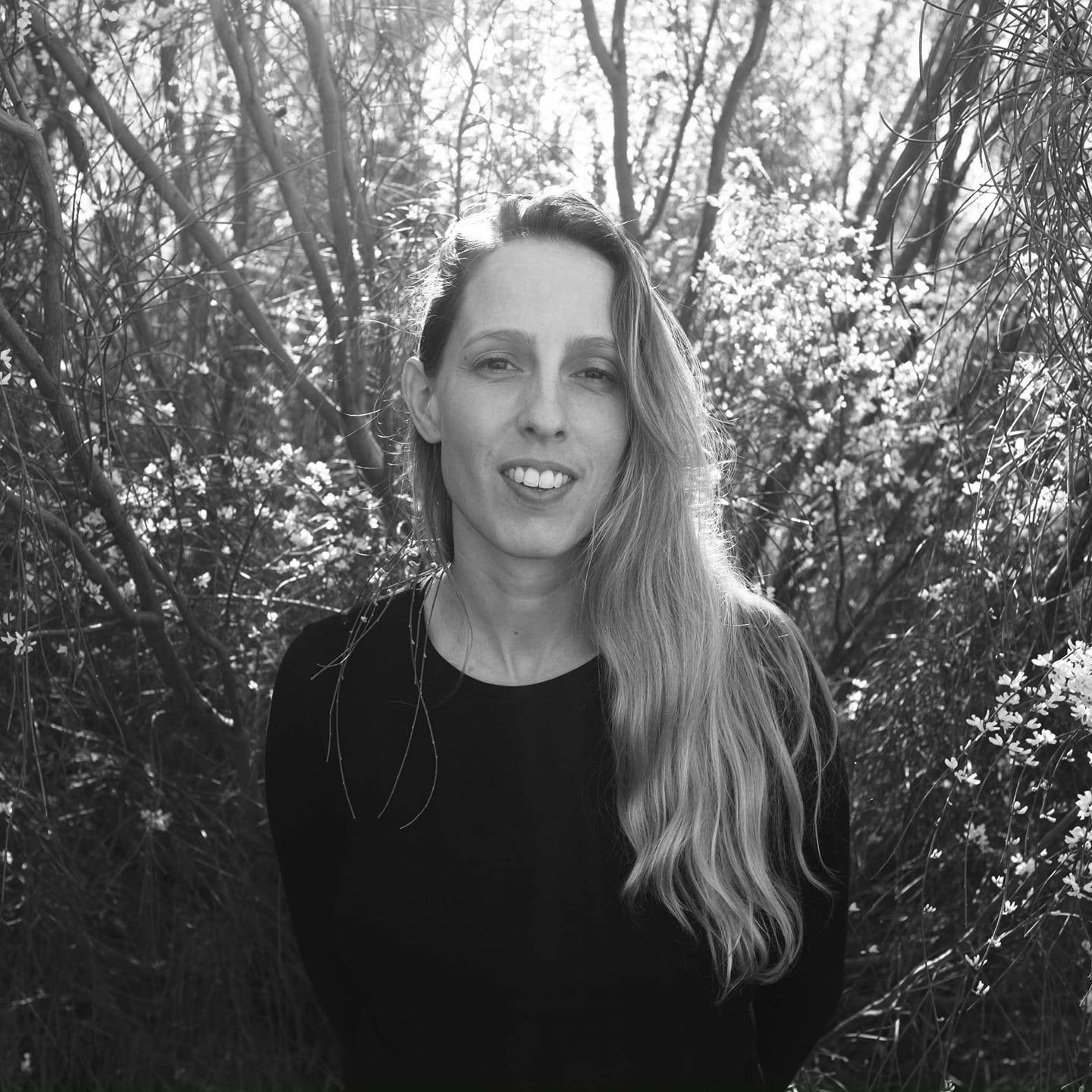
- Born: 29 January 1984 (age 41); Be'eri, Israel
- Occupations: visual artist; curator; director
- Organization: Be'eri Contemporary Art Gallery
- Notable work: "Fig and Liberation" (2022); "The Waterfall" (2022) (Collection of the Eretz Israel Museum); "Swan" (2023)
- Website: sofiemackie.com

Sofie Berzon MacKie (Hebrew: סופי ברזון מקאי; born January 29, 1984) is an Israeli visual artist, curator and director of the Be'eri Contemporary Art Gallery.

== Biography ==
Berzon MacKie was born in Kibbutz Be'eri to Yishai Admati, who was a printer in the Be'eri printing house, and to Jodi Admati-MacKie. Immediately after her birth, the family moved to London where they lived for about 7 years. In 1990, the family returned to Israel. Two months after their arrival, the mother died of blood cancer. The experience of immigration and being orphaned by the mother influence the processes of her creation. In 2000, she graduated from Maale HaBsor High School, majoring in photography. She served in the army as an intelligence officer in the Golani Brigade.

Between the years 2008-2010 she studied photography at Camera Obscura art school.

In 2011, she graduated from an integrated curation program at the Kalisher School of Art in collaboration with the Kibbutzim Seminar. In 2022, she graduated from the Mandel Leadership Institute's leadership-culture program and at the same time studied facilitator training in the community using the Photo Voice method and since then has been on the teaching staff of the "PHOTO IS;RAEL" organization.

=== The Be'eri Massacre ===
On October 7, during the surprise attack on Israel, Berzon MacKie was surrounded with her children and her partner in a protected room in her home for about 20 hours until they were rescued by the IDF. The interview she had with Zion Nanos went viral. A quote from the interview is regularly circulated on social media, as part of the call for leadership to take responsibility for the disaster.

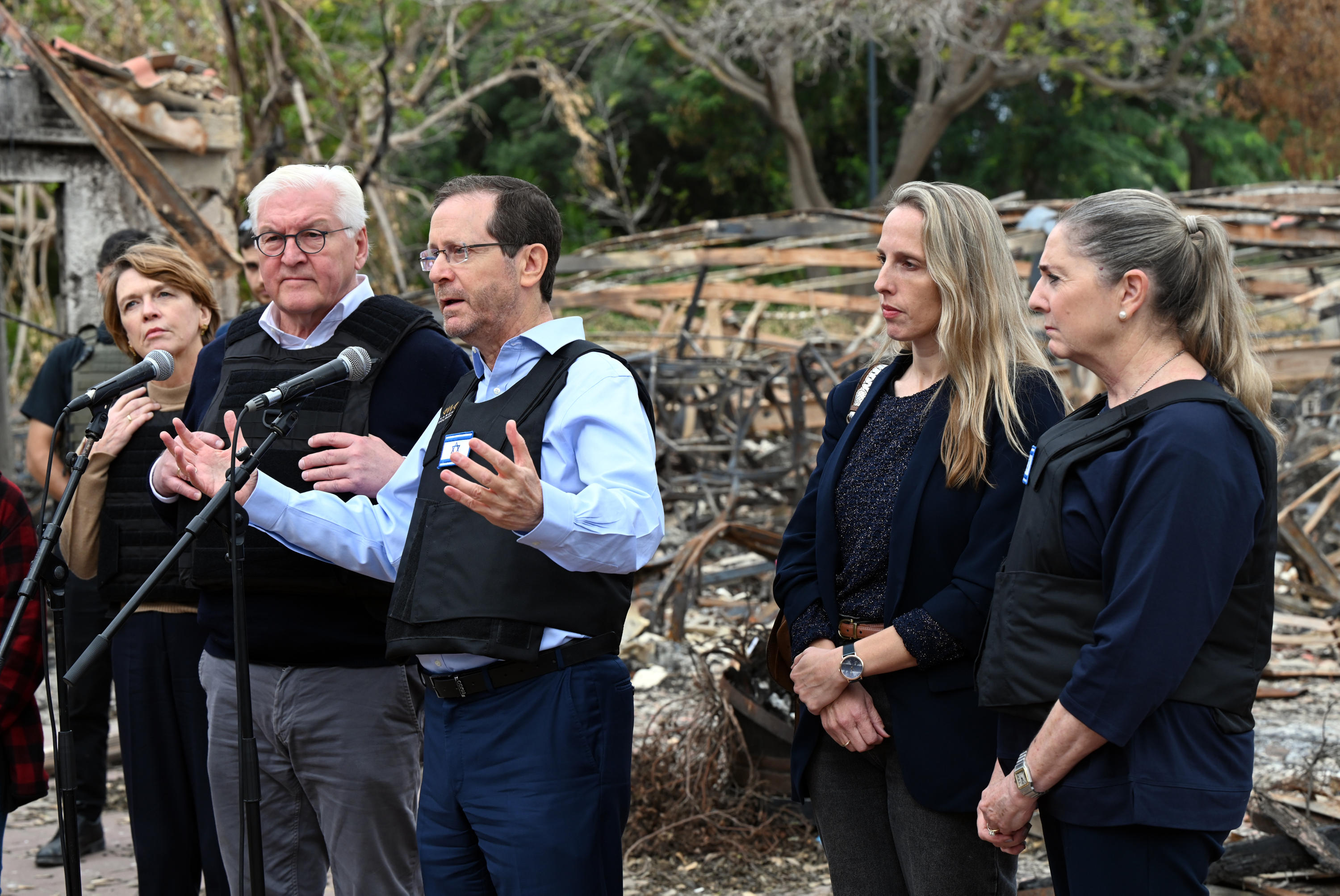
Sofie Berzon MacKie with President Isaac Herzog in Be'eri, November 2023

On January 15, 2024, Berzon MacKie spoke in front of the Knesset demanding that the thirty-seventh government of Israel take responsibility for the failure. In the same month, Berzon MacKie, Ron Shafroni, who is also a survivor of the massacre in the kibbutz, Dani Halutz, Naama Lazimi, Moshe Ya'alon and others submitted a petition to have Benjamin Netanyahu expelled from office. The petition was rejected on the grounds that the Prime Minister did not have enough time to respond to the claims.

== Artistic work ==
Berzon MacKie's works are presented in exhibitions and private and public collections in Israel and around the world. Her work is closely related to her biography. She engages in her artistic work on the themes of identity, migration, nature and culture relations, hybridity, motherhood and home. Anat Lidror, the curator and director of the Givat Haviva Gallery, wrote about her work:

It seems that Sophie came to the simple kibbutz, with the small and common nature, with European eyes and aesthetics, so that even the simple and the puddle in the open nature around her she photographs heroically with the look of a London immigrant: Half enchanted, half adorning the simple in regal robes

— Anat Lidror

As a curator, Berzon MacKie works in long-term processes with selected artists as Miriam Kabsa, Shimon Pinto, Ayelet Hashar Cohen, Daniel Chetzik and others, in preparation for solo exhibitions and the publication of artist books and catalogs. As the director of the gallery in Be'eri, the promotion of art in the periphery which is a central part of her artistic worldview.

Berzon MacKie is leading the establishment of the new Be'eri Gallery in its temporary home in Beit Romano in Tel Aviv, at the same time as leading the project of the new art house in Be'eri in place of the gallery that burned down on October 7 with the support of the German government and President Isaac Herzog.

== Awards and recognition ==
- 2024 Lily Fund for 'Silver Water and Starry Earth'
- 2024 Lottery Board for 'Silver Water and Starry Earth'
- 2023 Photographer of the Year, Julia Margaret Cameron Award, for 'Silver Water and Starry Earth'
- 2023 Honorable Mention, Collage Pollux Awards,, for 'Silver Water and Starry Earth'
- 2022 The Fund for Independent Creators for the 'Nature Reserve'
- 2022 Prix Pictet candidate with 'nature reserve'
- 2022 Honorable Mention for 'Nature Reserve', Julia Margaret Cameron Award
- 2020 International Photography Awards Honorable Mention for '4 Days'
- 2020 Finalist 14th Arte Laguna Priza, Venice
- 2019 "Shortlisted" Sunny Art Prize, London
- 2018 International Photography Awards, honorable mention for 30,000 dunams
- 2010 International Photography awards, honorable mention for Nasreen
