= Anzac Memorial (Israel) =

WWI memorial in Israel

Coordinates: 31°26′55″N 34°27′43″E

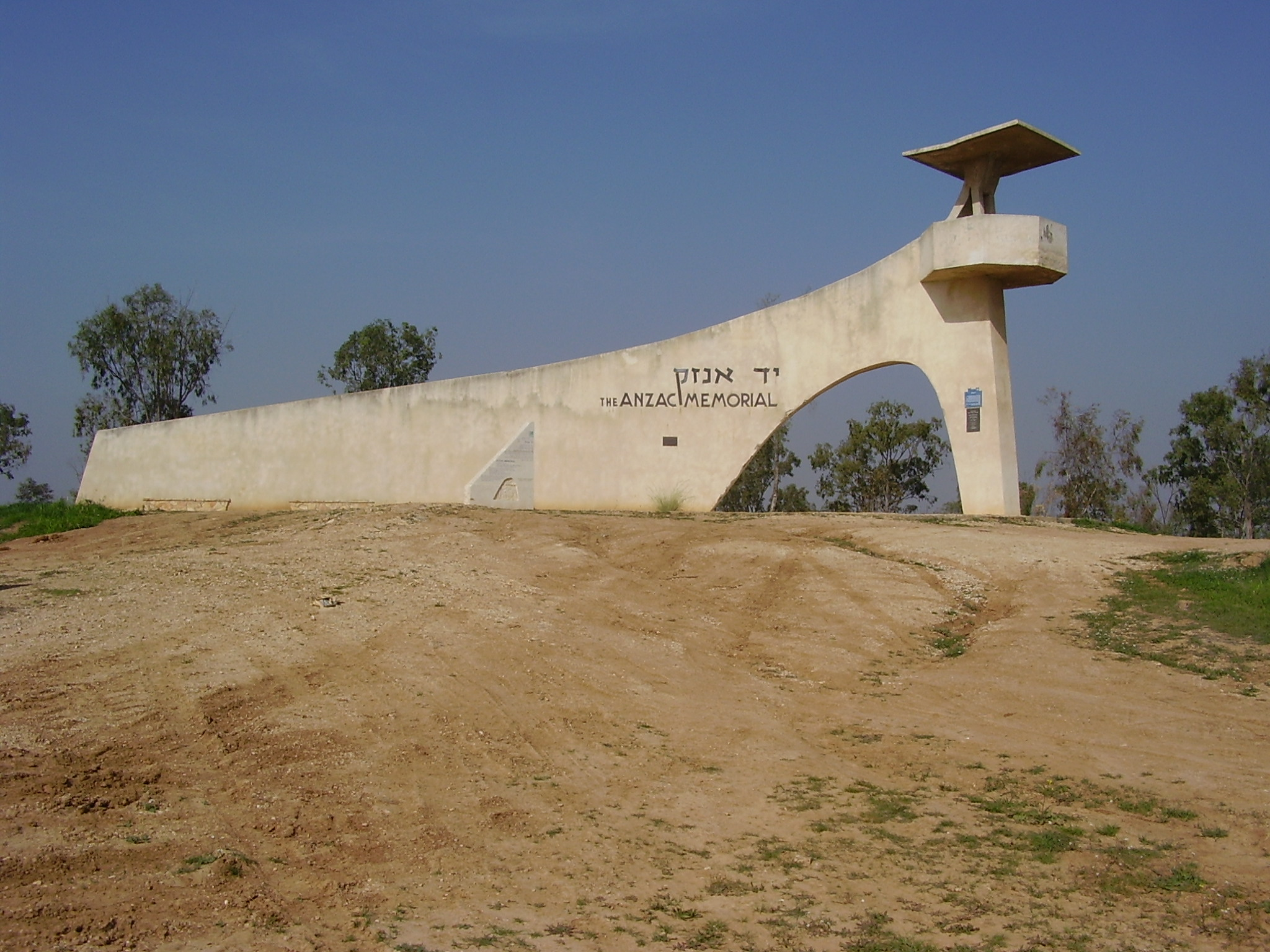
ANZAC Memorial

The Anzac Memorial (Hebrew: יד אנזא"ק, romanized: Yad ANZAC – The Be'er Sheva Anzac Memorial Center) is a monument in Be'eri Forest, Negev, Israel, to the soldiers of the Australian and New Zealand armies who were killed in Palestine during the First Battle of Gaza and Second Battle of Gaza of World War I.

== History ==
The acronym ANZAC stands for "Australian and New Zealand Army Corps", but now it is treated as a regular word.

The monument was designed by architect Yedidya Eisenshtat (ידידיה איזנשטט), erected with the support of JNF Australia and Jewish communities in Australia and New Zealand. It is built in the shape of the letter A, the first letter in the word Anzac, and is topped by an observation deck overlooking the entire area. It was inaugurated in 1967 to mark the 50th anniversary of the Second Battle of Gaza in April 1917, in which Anzac forces took part, as part of the Sinai and Palestine campaign against the Ottoman Empire.

In 2018 an incendiary kite sent by Hamas from Gaza Strip ignited the forest neighboring the monument. The forest was severely damaged.

== See also ==
- Anzac Memorial, Australia
