= Be'eri Badlands =

Nature reserve in Israel

Coordinates: 31°26′33.9″N 34°29′13.0″E

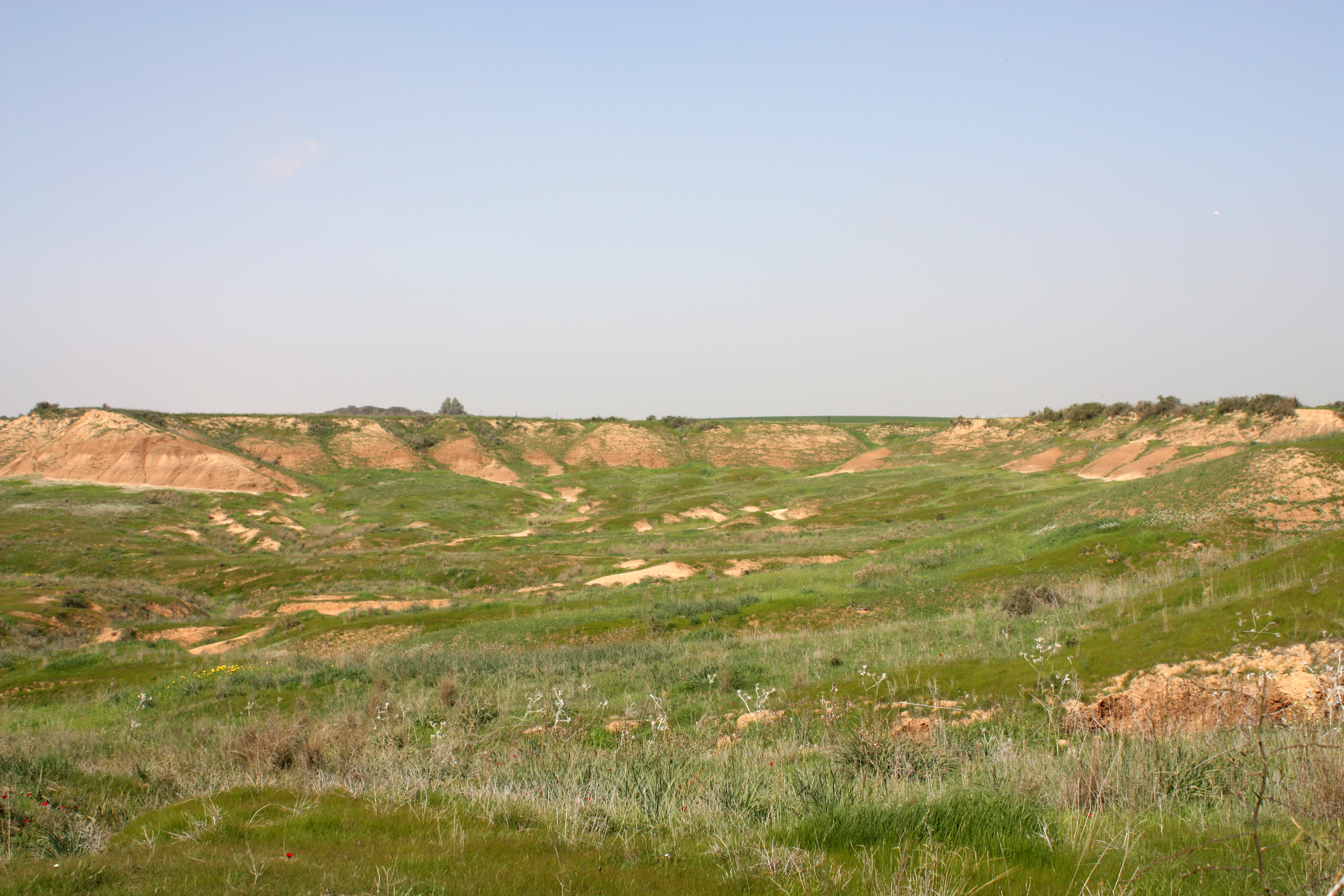
- Interactive map of Be'eri Badlands
- Location: Western Negev, Southern District, Israel
- Nearest town: Be'eri
- Area: 670 ha (1,700 acres)

The Be'eri Badlands (Hebrew: בתרונות בארי, romanized: Bitronot Be'eri) Nature Reserve (also the Crater Reserve (Hebrew: שמורת המכתש, Makhtesh Reserve)) is located in the Western Negev area, northwest of kibbutz Be'eri within the Be'eri Forest.

The badlands area lies in the upper basin of the Sahaf Stream (Nahal Sahaf) and occupies the area of 6,700 dunams. It is a valley of crater-like landform (makhtesh) with sidewalls of height rising 10-15m, eroded in the loess soil by rainwater and tributaries of the Sahaf Stream.

The reserve contains natural flora and fauna, which disappeared from the surrounding plains due to agriculture. There are 175 plant species in the reserve.

In April-May 2018 a considerable area of the reserve was burned due to Palestinian airborne arson attacks. The arson attacks were repeated in May 2021.

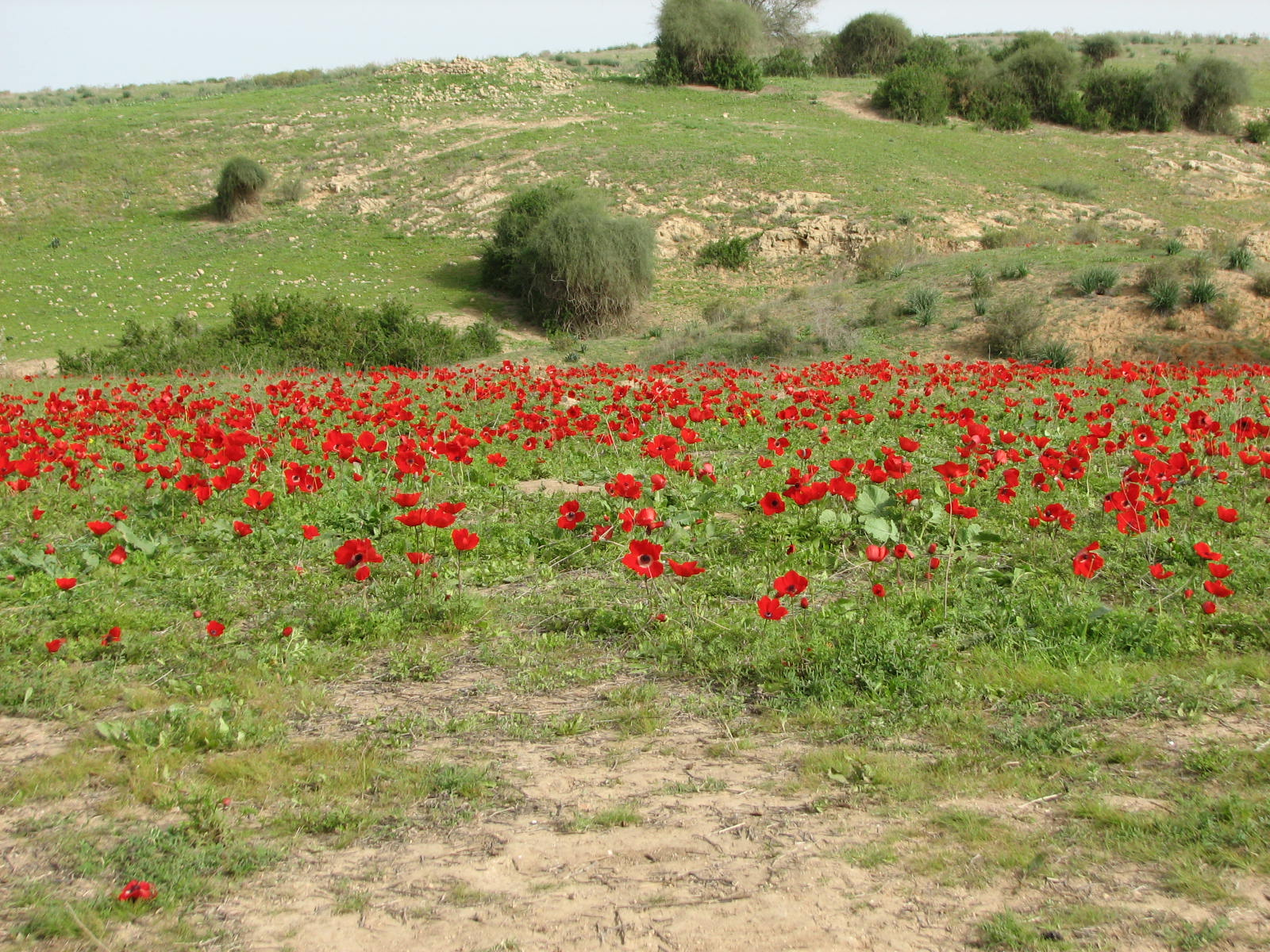
What wonders can a bit of rain do even in the Badlands of Be'eri.
