= Be'eri =

Kibbutz in southern Israel

Be'eri: בְּאֵרִי (Hebrew)
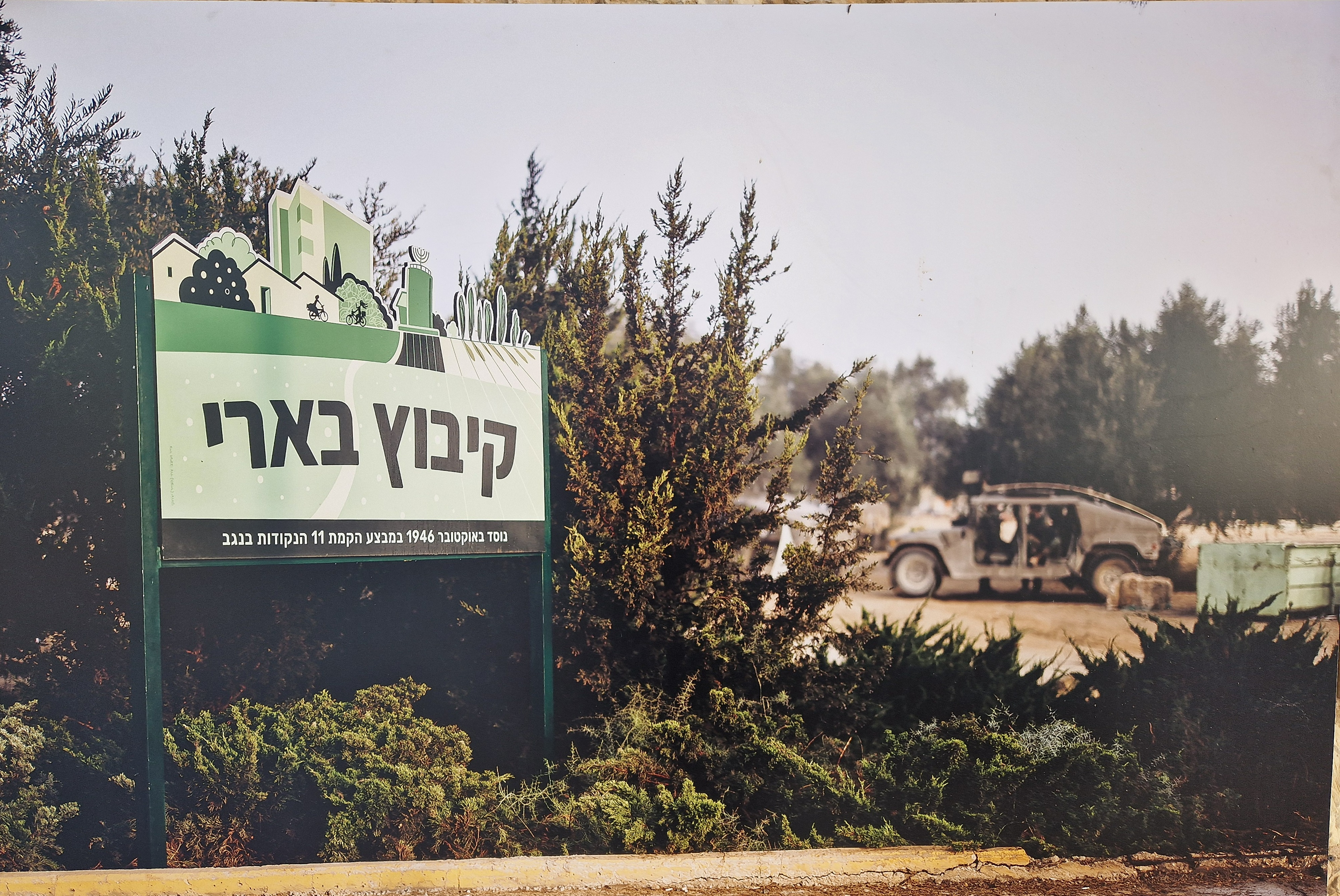
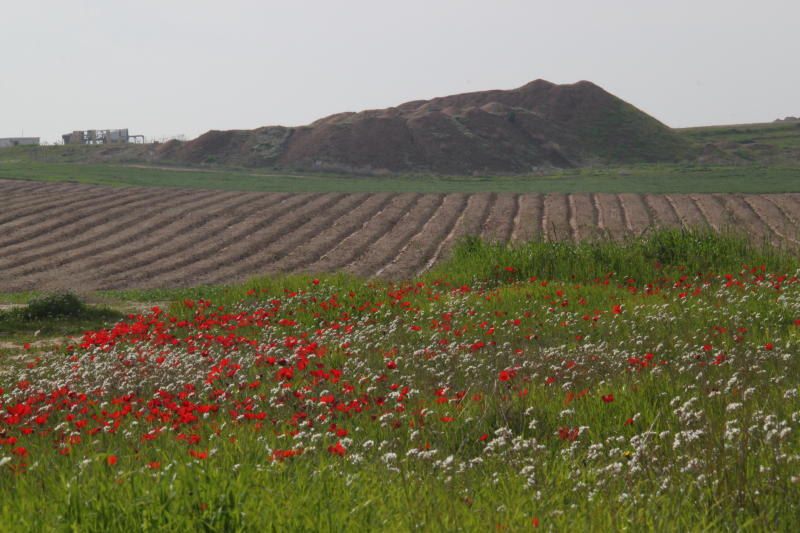
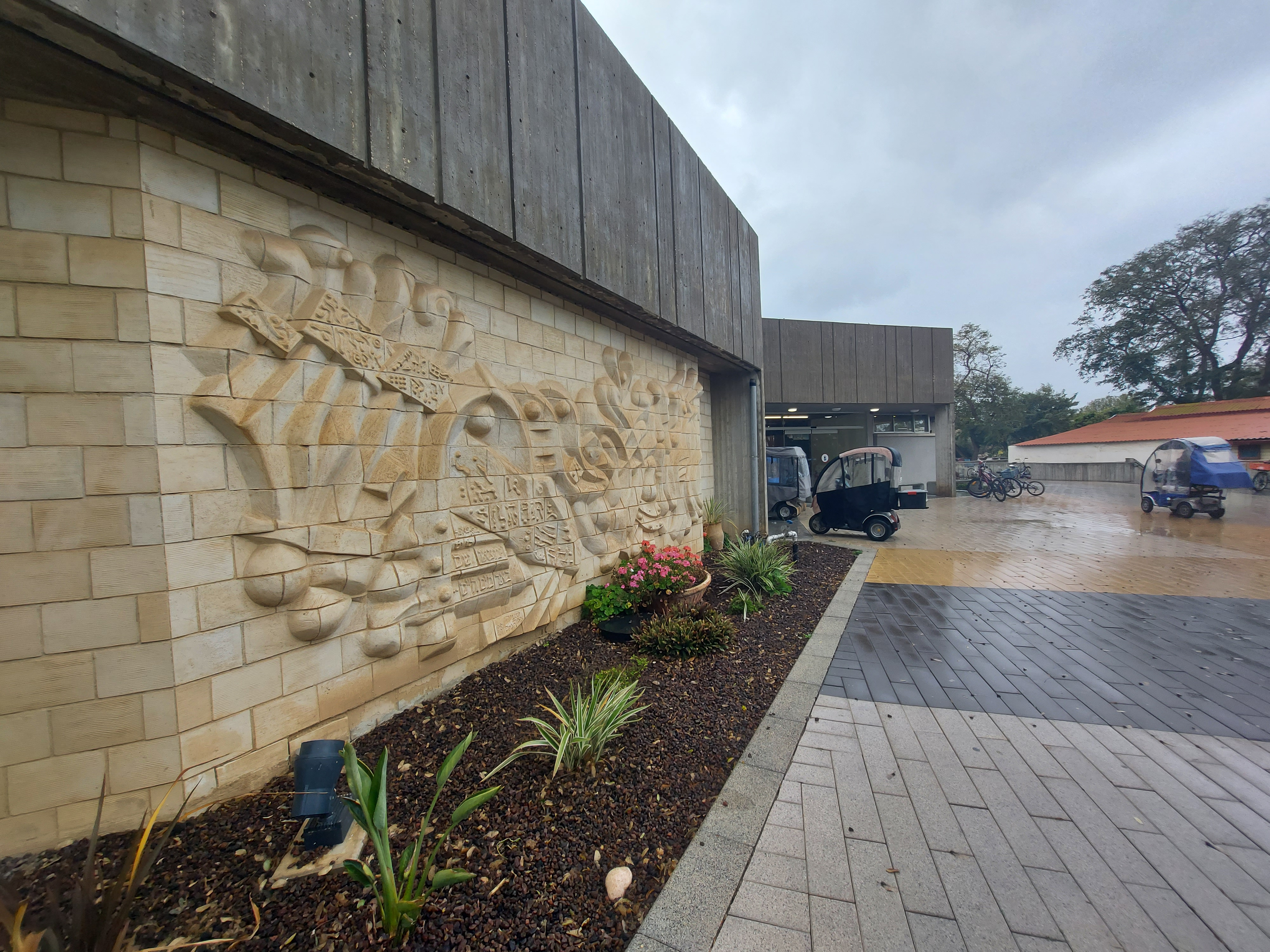
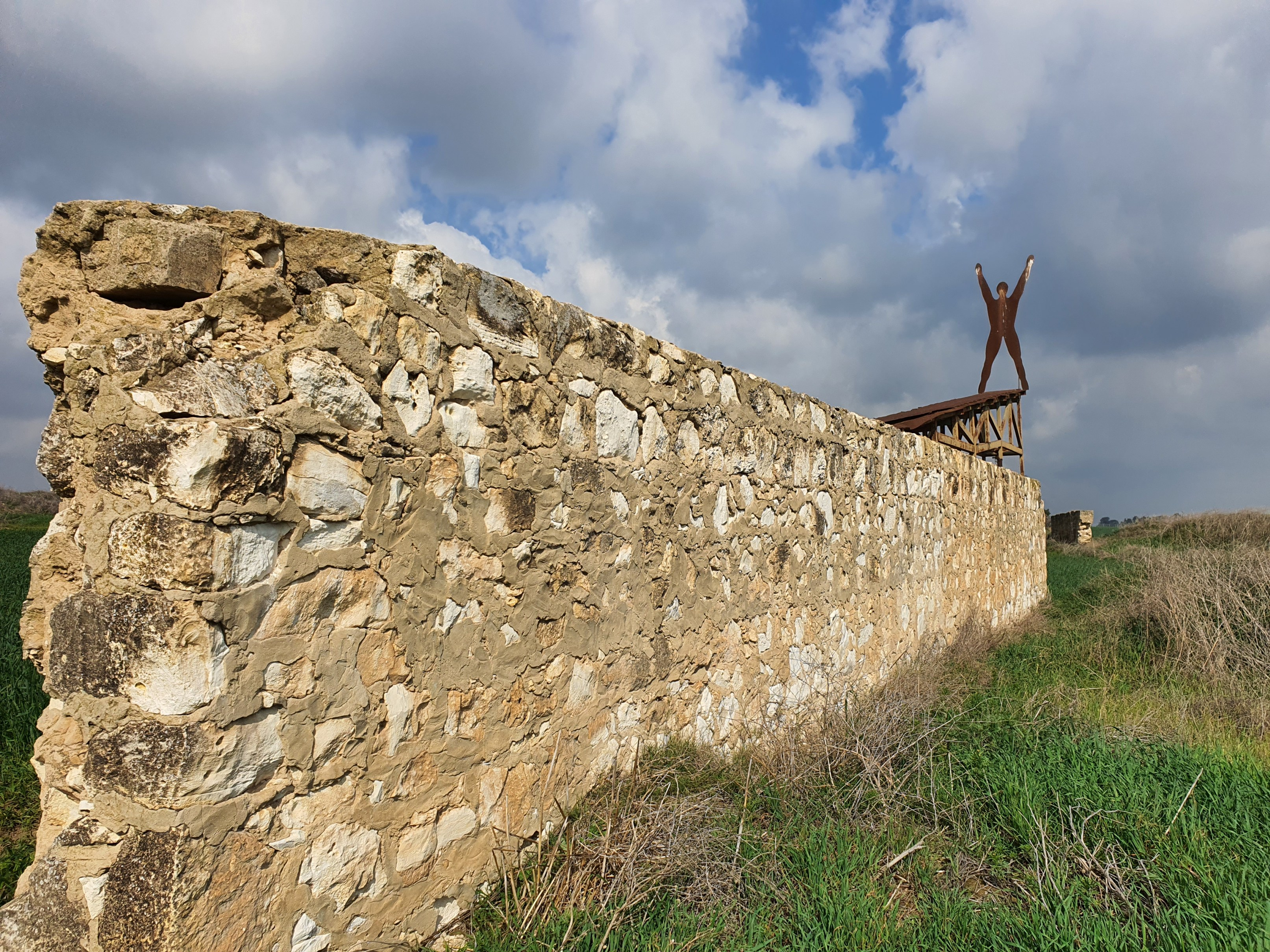
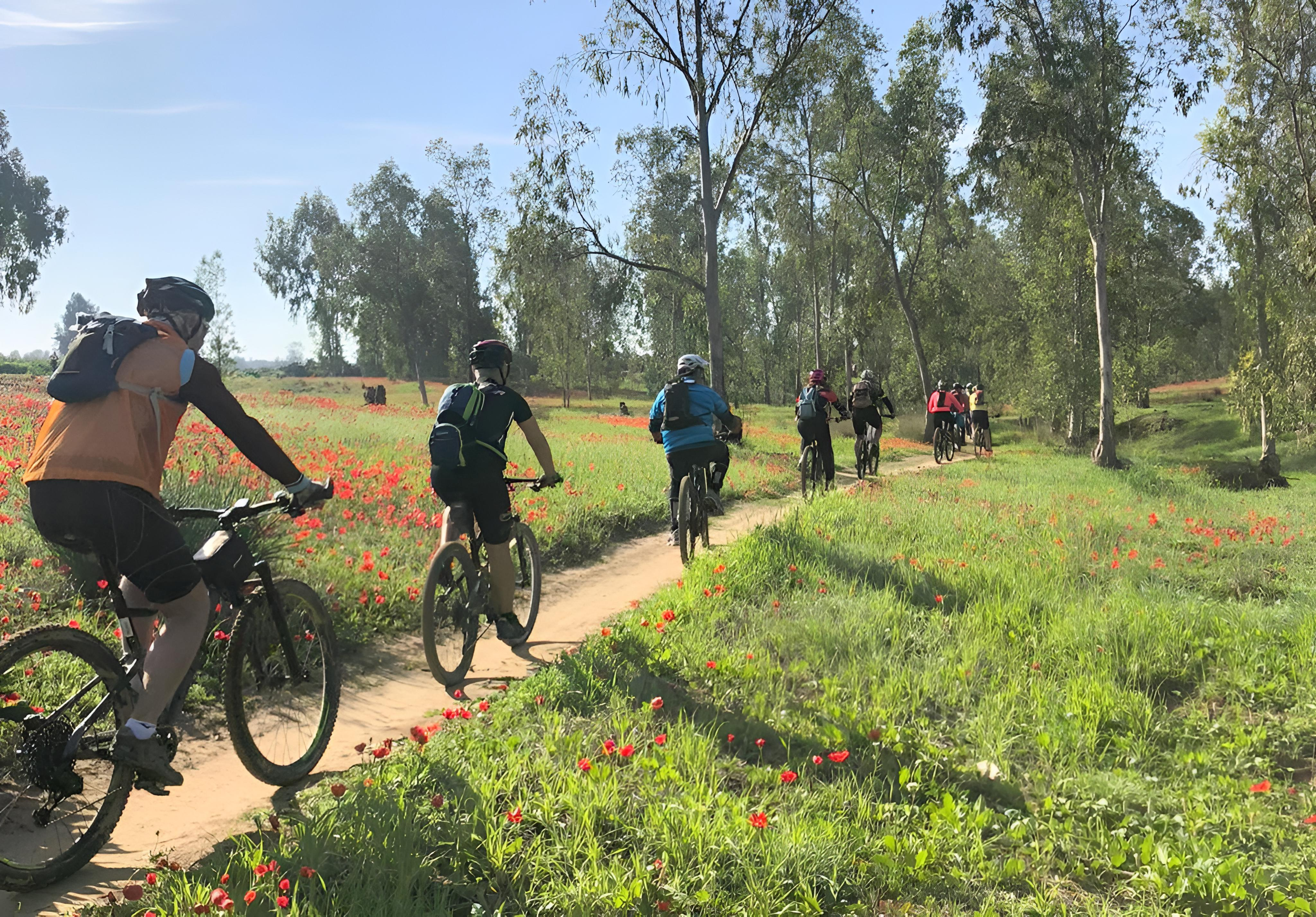

- Location within Northwest Negev region of Israel Location within Israel
- Coordinates: 31°25′26″N 34°29′23″E
- Country: Israel
- District: Southern
- Subdistrict: Beersheba
- Council: Eshkol
- Affiliation: Kibbutz Movement
- Founded: 6 October 1946
- Founder: No'al members
- Population (2024): 1,124
- Website: beeri.kibbutz.org.il

Be'eri (Hebrew: בְּאֵרִי) is a kibbutz in southern Israel. Located in the north-western Negev desert near the eastern border with the Gaza Strip, it falls under the jurisdiction of Eshkol Regional Council. In 2024 it had a population of 1,124.

A total of 101 Israeli civilians and 31 security personnel were killed and 32 hostages were taken from the kibbutz during the Be'eri massacre led by Hamas in the October 7 attacks. Around one in ten residents of the kibbutz were killed in the attack.

== History ==
Kibbutz Be'eri was established on 6 October 1946 as one of the 11 points in the Negev. It was located near Wadi Nahabir, a few kilometres south of Be'erot Yitzhak. Its founders were members of the HaNoar HaOved VeHaLomed movement, who had been preparing in Maoz Haim, as well as some Hebrew scouts and a group of Iraqi Jews who had survived the Farhud and trekked across the desert to Mandatory Palestine in 1947. It was named after Berl Katznelson, as Be'eri (Beeri) (a biblical name) was his pen name.

Be'eri had a population of over 150 in 1947. The early settlers engaged in land reclamation and tree planting. The Jewish National Fund reported that for months the kibbutz was completely isolated, "but the settlers held their ground until the liberation of the Negev in October 1948."

When a reporter from Haaretz visited the kibbutz in 1955, he says that the residents were constantly being shelled upon by the Egyptians, with dozens of shells falling in the cotton fields where groups of children and workers were picking cotton.

After Israeli independence, the kibbutz moved three kilometres southeast to its present location. It is considered one of Israel's wealthiest kibbutzim. During the Second Intifada, the kibbutz suffered from Qassam rocket attacks and combat near the Israel–Gaza barrier eight kilometres away.

A sulfur deposit from Upper Pleistocene sandstone was discovered in the vicinity of Kibbutz Be'eri.

=== Be'eri massacre ===
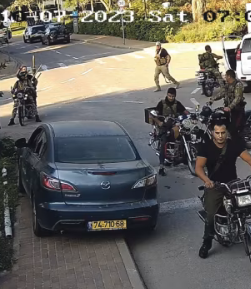
Hamas gunmen infiltrating the kibbutz on October 7, 2023

Relations between Be'eri residents and Gazans were reportedly good. Bret Stephens noted that the kibbutz was "well known for its pro-peace sympathies", having a special fund to financially aid Gazans who worked in the kibbutz. Residents would also drive sick Palestinians to an oncology center in southern Israel.

On 7 October 2023, Hamas militants infiltrated the kibbutz, took 32 people hostage and killed more than 100 people in their coordinated attacks across Israel that initiated the Gaza war. Relatives of some of those killed have demanded a probe into the potential deaths of some of these hostages from friendly fire, including one incident in which an Israeli tank fired at a house full of hostages. One of the hostages abducted from Be'eri was killed by Hamas, along with 5 other Israeli hostages, after 330 days in captivity.

In the aftermath of the massacre, the kibbutz's population was evacuated. As of December 2024, some 200 residents had returned to Be'eri while hundreds more lived elsewhere in Israel, including many at kibbutz Hatzerim. It is hoped that the kibbutz will be fully rebuilt by August 2026.

In December 2025, kibbutz residents voted to demolish all the homes damaged in the massacre, bar one. This home will initially be preserved for five years for testimony and as a memorial. There are no plans to rebuild on the site of the damaged homes.

80 houses are currently being built on the eastern part of the kibbutz, with funding from Tkuma Directorate, a state agency established in response to the October 7 attacks.

== Economy ==
Unlike many kibbutzim that have undergone privatization, Kibbutz Be'eri has retained the old cooperative model. The main source of income is the Be'eri print company, which has an annual turnover of hundreds of millions of shekels. The company has expanded into package printing, online photo albums and professional marketing material for small businesses. It also owns a food tech company, Hinoman, which developed and cultivates superfood Mankai (Wolffia globosa) using hydroponics.

The kibbutz grows jojoba and markets oil from the fruit to the cosmetics industry. Other sources of income are a boutique dairy that produces premium handmade cheese.

== Landmarks ==
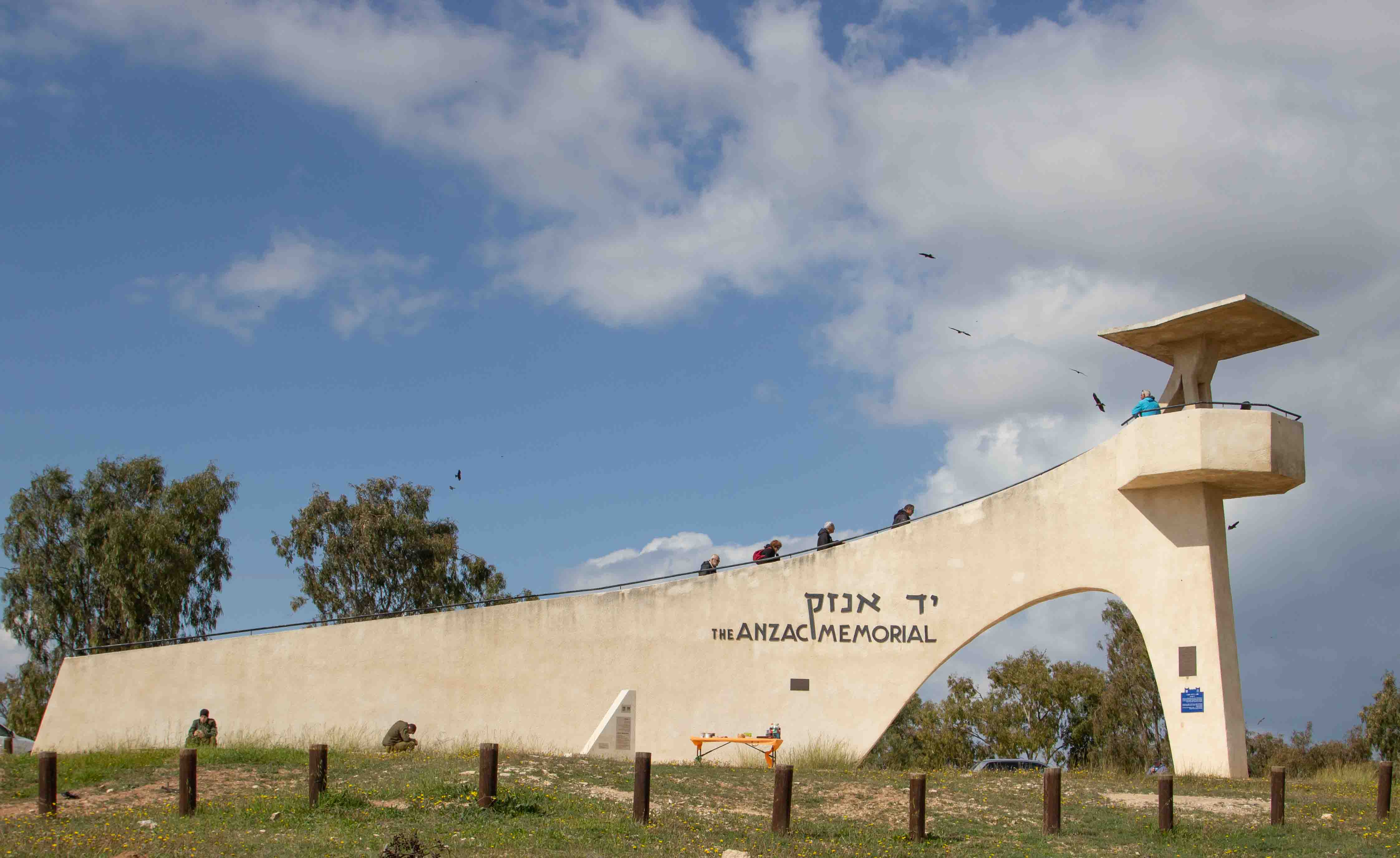
ANZAC memorial

About four kilometers to the north lies the ANZAC Monument, commemorating the ANZAC soldiers who died in the Third Battle of Gaza in World War I.

== Sports ==
The kibbutz's basketball team, Hapoel Be'eri, plays in Liga Artzit.

== Notable people ==
- Shoshan Haran, agronomist and former hostage
- Sofie Berzon MacKie, visual artist, curator and director of Be'eri Contemporary Art Gallery
- Eli Sharabi, former hostage and author
- Vivian Silver, peace and women’s rights activist

== Gallery ==
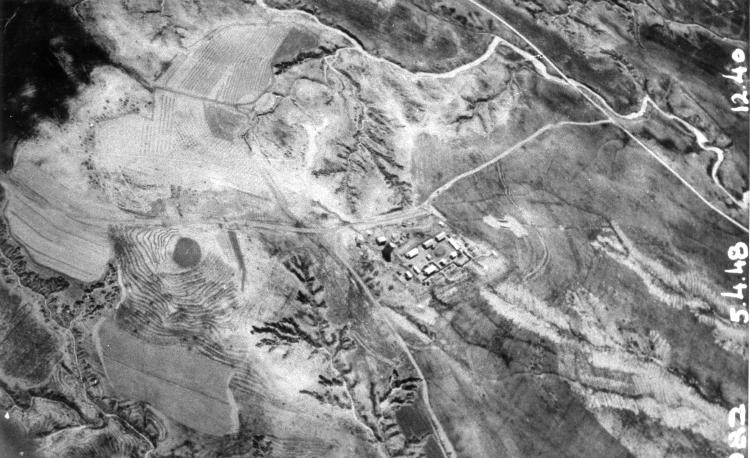
Kibbutz Be'eri in 1948

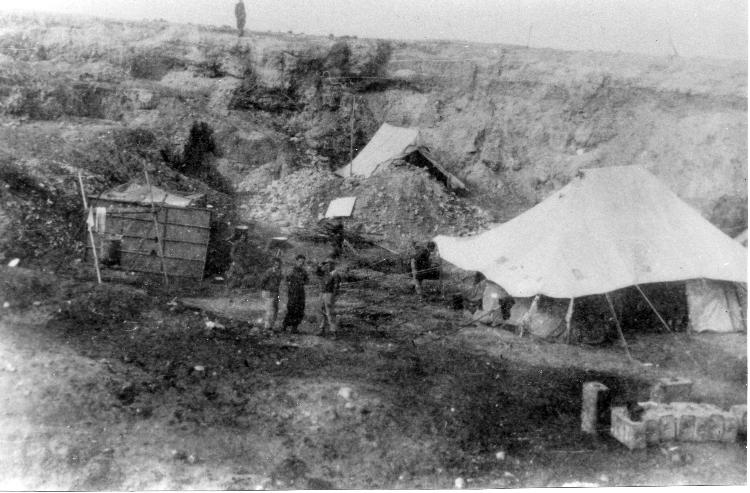
Yiftach Brigade position close to Be'eri in 1948

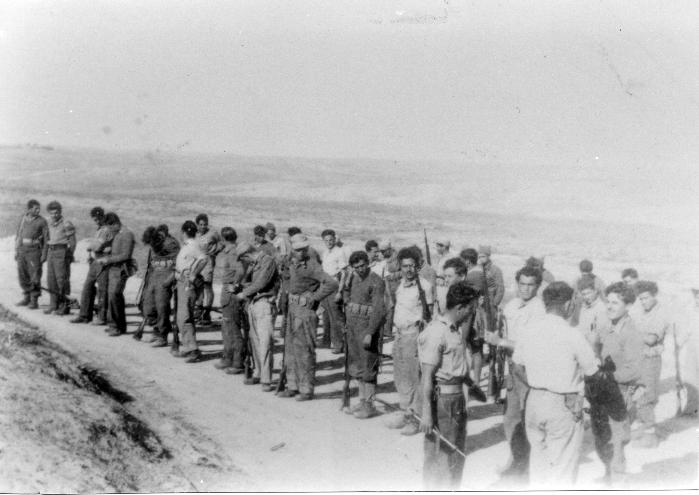
Members of Yiftach Brigade "D" company assembled at Be'eri in 1948

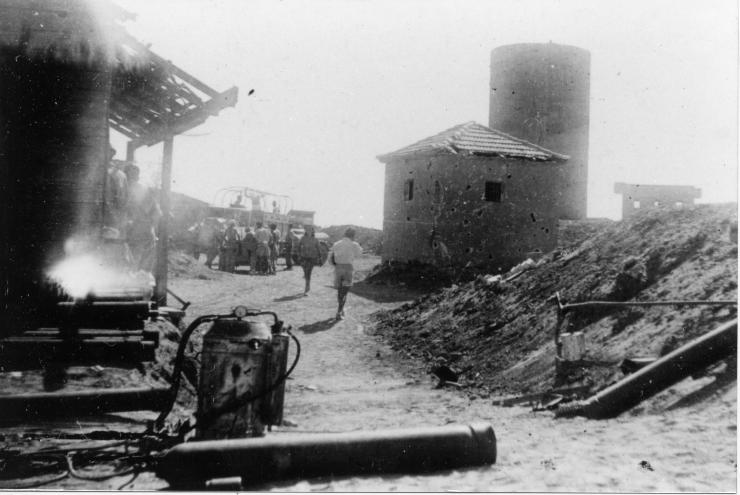
Kibbutz Be'eri after the fighting in 1948

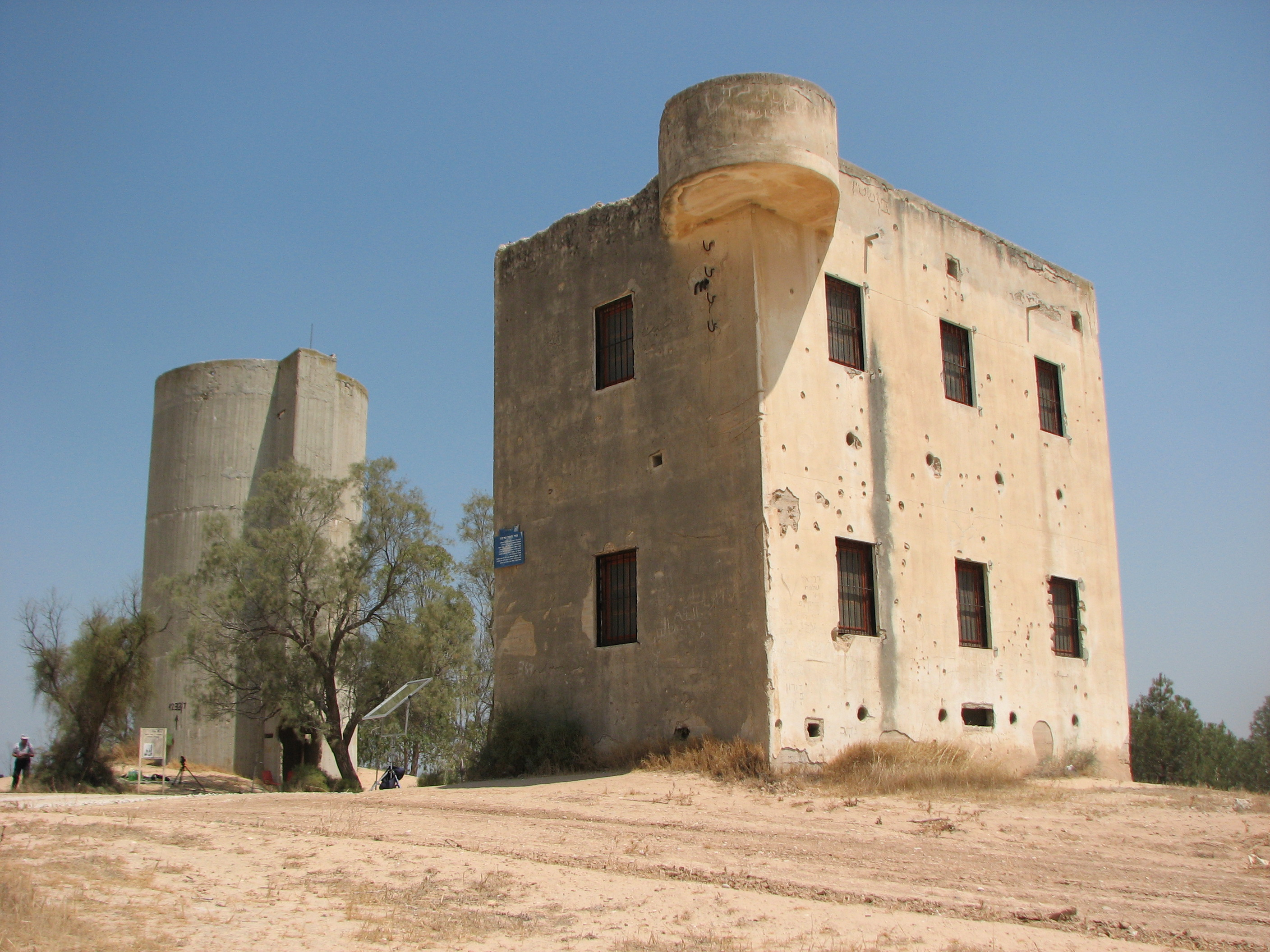
Old water tower and security fort

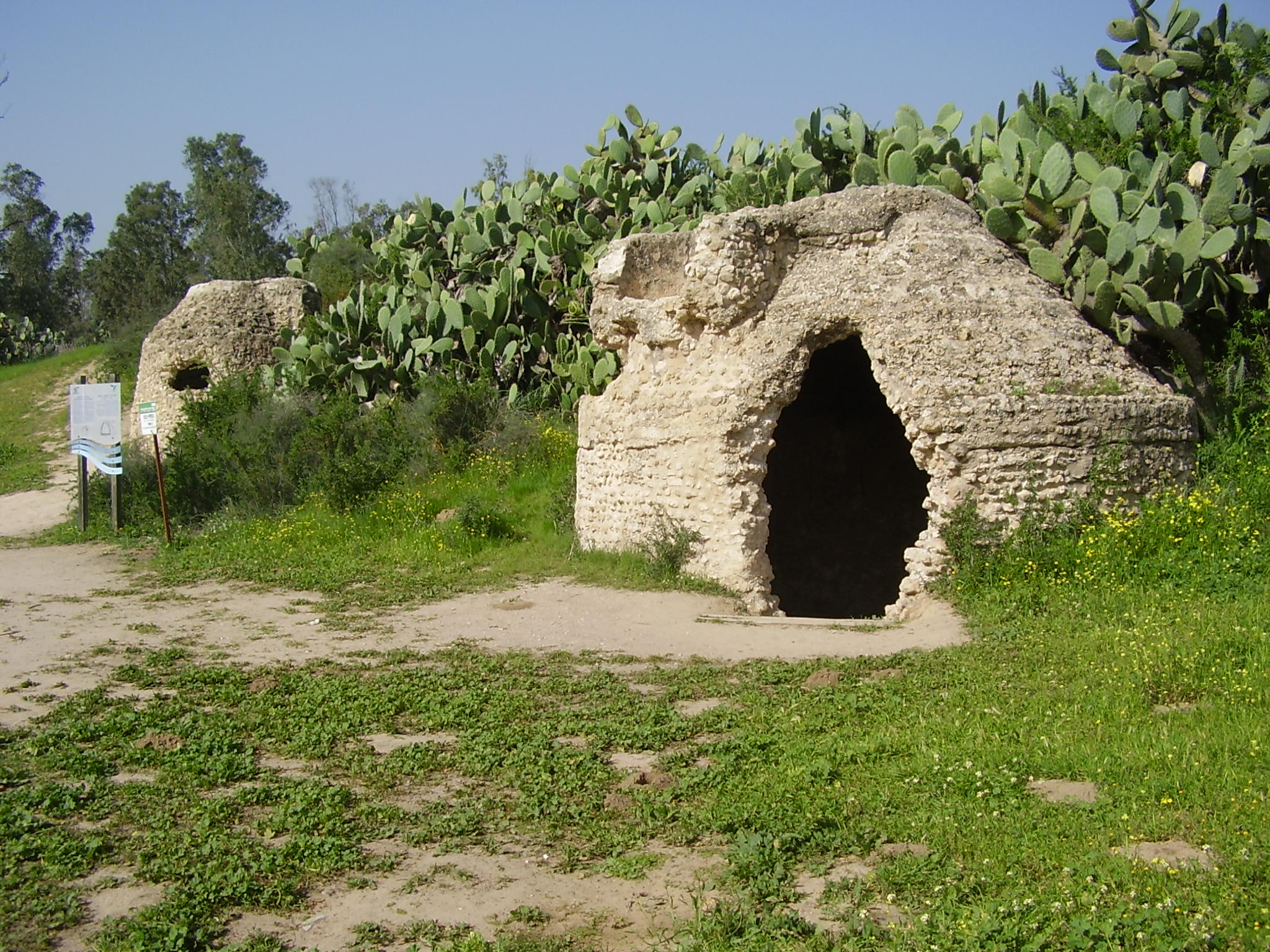
Byzantine water cisterns

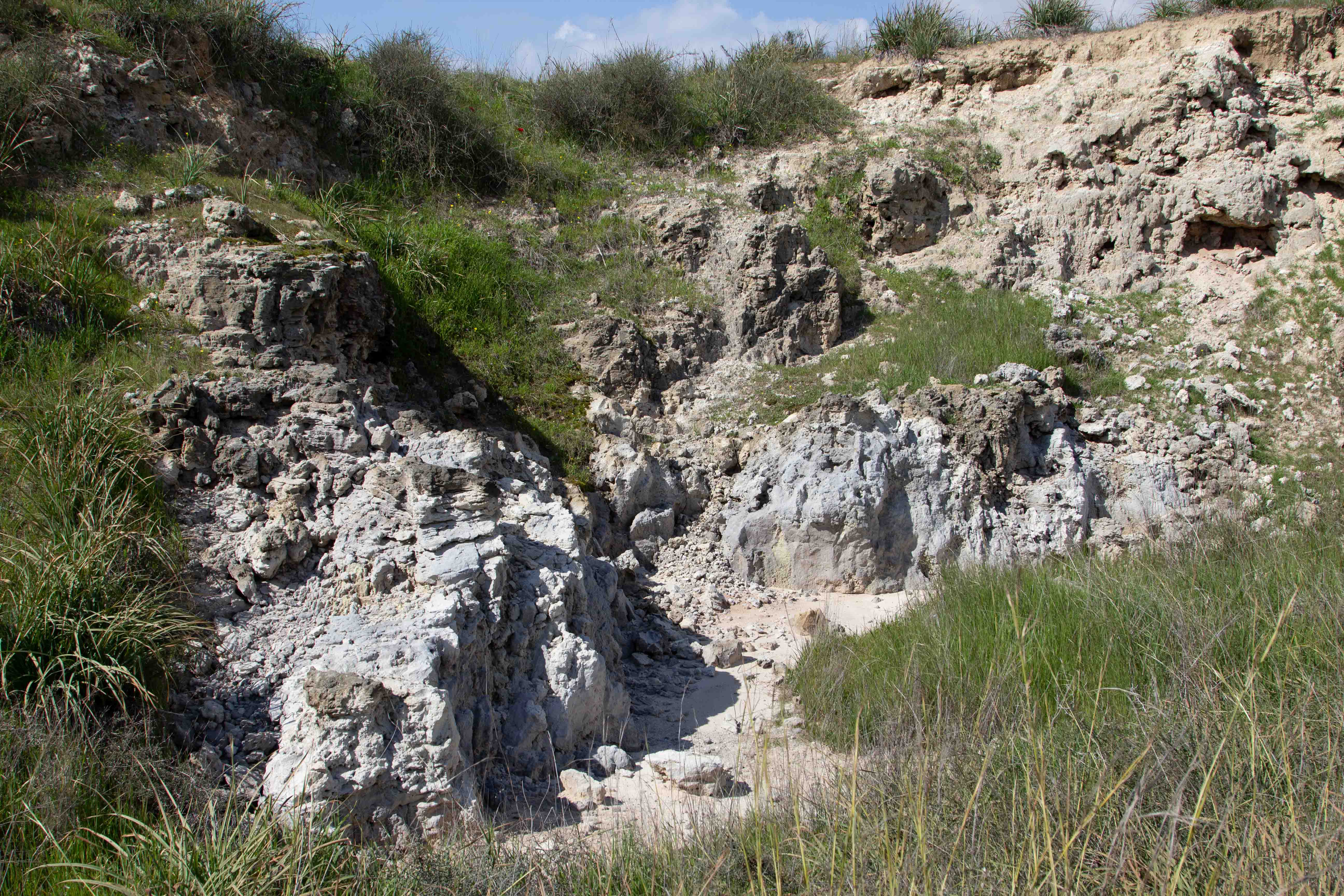
Sulfur mines

== See also ==
- Be'eri Forest
