= Driving licence in Israel =

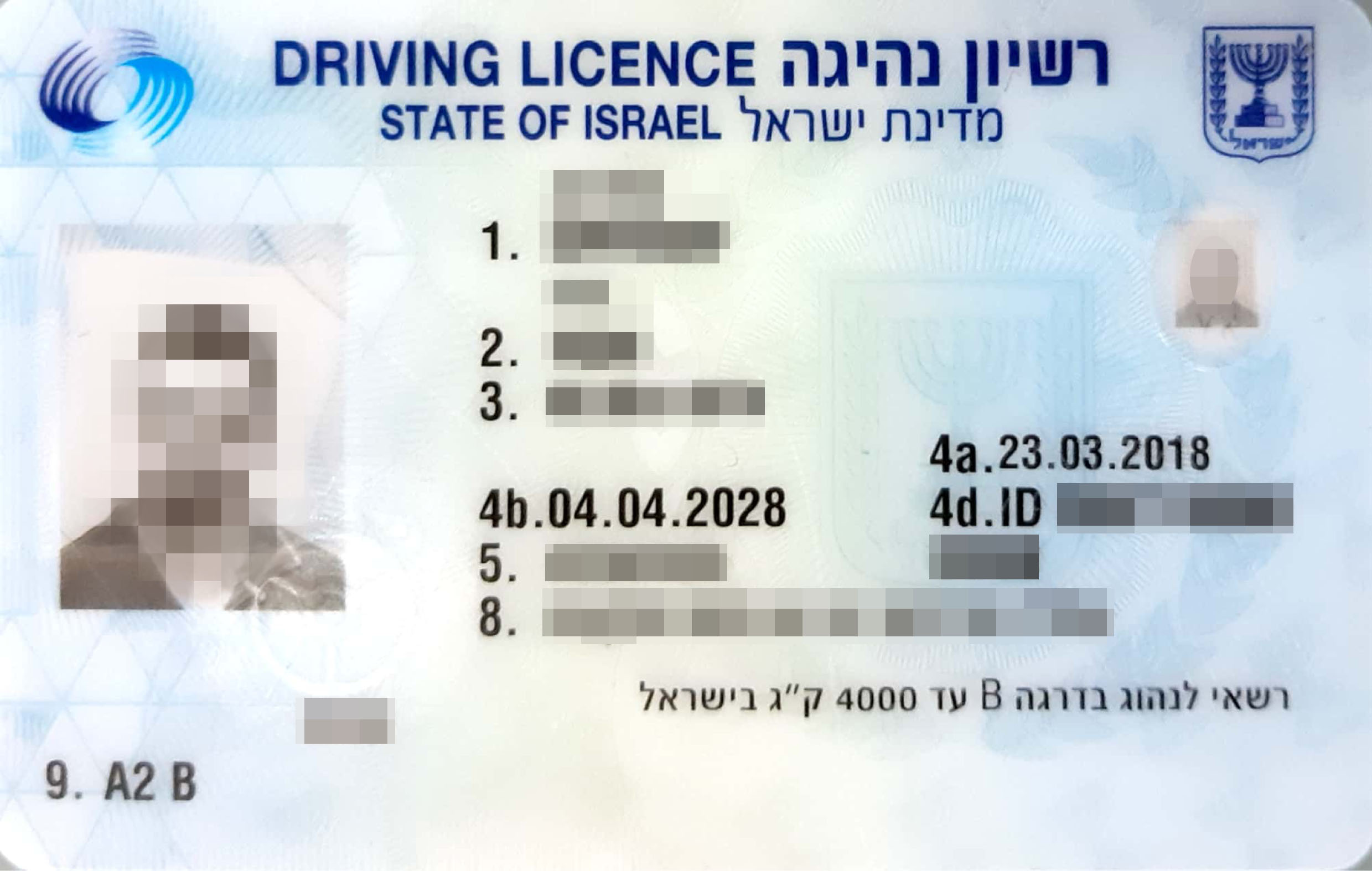
Israeli Driving License (2018, front side). 1.Last name 2.First name 3.Date of birth 4a.Date of issuance 4b.Date of expiration 4d.Identification number 5.License number 8.Residential address 9.License categories

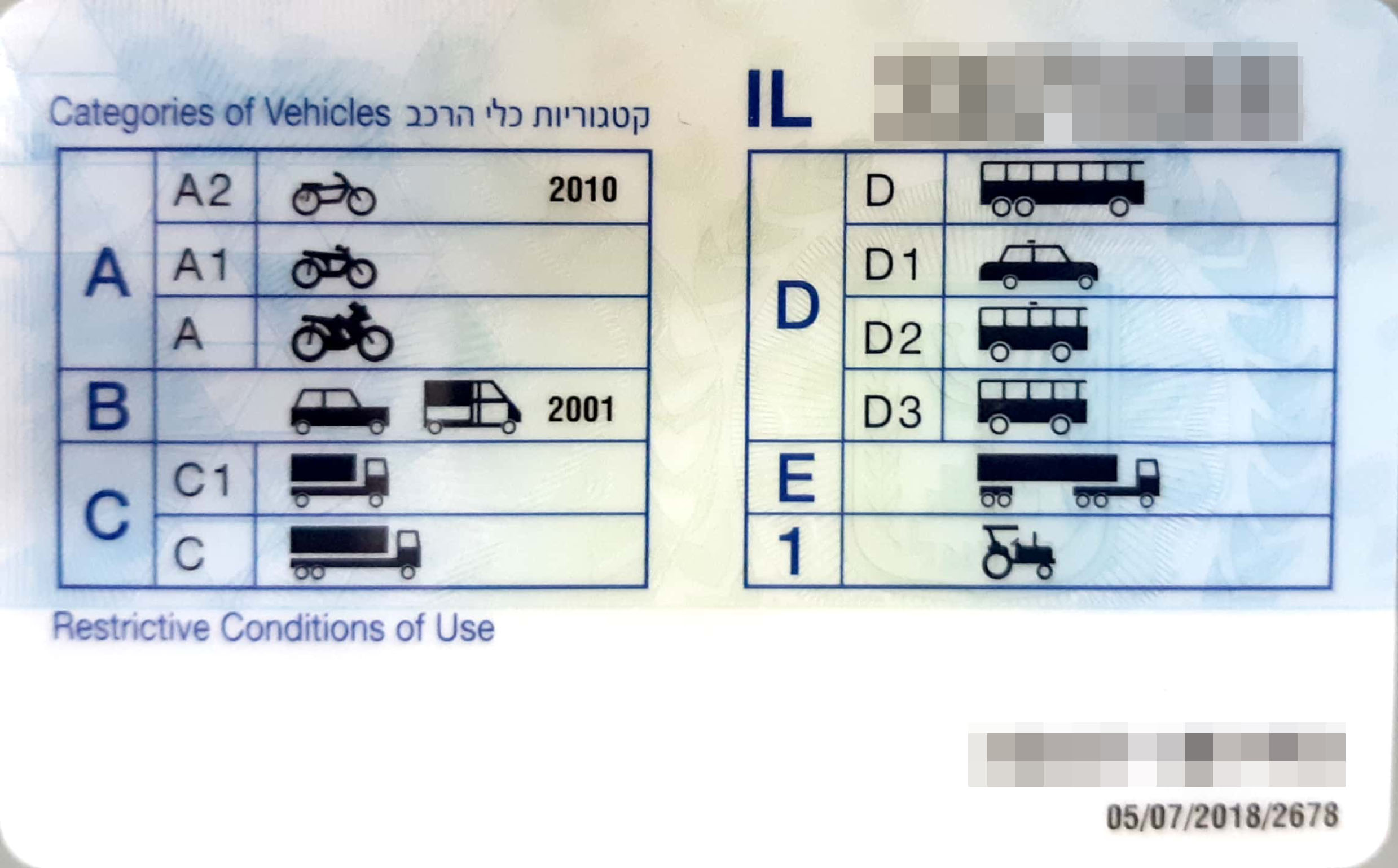
Israeli Driving License (2018, back side).

Driving licenses in Israel come in twelve types, similar to the European driving license (although small differences exist). To receive a license, each applicant must pass a medical and eye checkup, and a theoretical test, before taking a number of practical lessons culminating in the practical test.

== Types of licence ==
Israel has the following types of driving licences:

- A2, A1, A – for two-wheeled vehicles, with horse power limits set at: A2 – engine capacity up to 125 cc and 14.6 HP, A1 – 47.46 HP, A – no limit
- B – for passenger vehicles up to 3.5 tons and up to 8 passengers not including driver (Licenses of this category issued before January 1, 2007, allow driving vehicles up to 4 tons in Israel only)
- C1, C – C1 for small trucks up to 5 tons, C – for trucks up to 12 tons and no tonnage limit
- D3, D2, D1, D – for large passenger vehicles. D3 for a private minibus up to 16 passengers and 5 tons, D2 for a public minibus with the same weight and passengers' limit, D1 for a taxi or public transport vehicle with up to 16 passengers, and D for buses.
- C+E – for commercial motor vehicles, up to 3.5 tons (including attachments)
- 1 – for tractors (not included in EU standards)

== Passenger car licence ==
Anyone aged at least 16 years and 9 months may receive a Type B driver's license. After receiving both a medical and eye checkup, an applicant can take a 30 question multiple-choice test, of which they must answer at least 26 correctly. Before taking the actual driving test, they must receive at least 28 lessons at a certified driving school. After passing the internal driving school test, the instructor will arrange the road test, which will be taken in the driving school's vehicle. If someone fails either the written or driving test, one must wait one day before retaking the written test. In the past, the wait time to take a second driving test was uncertain, ranging between three and six months. Since July 2018, the driving tests are conducted by private contractors and the wait time has been reduced to up to 5 days for the first test and up to 14 days from the second test and onward. Once the driving test has been passed, the licensing authority will issue a temporary license together with a payment voucher. Once the fee has been paid, the official license will be mailed.

For the first three months, a new licensee aged under 24 must be accompanied by someone aged over 24, who has held a license for at least 5 years, or someone over 30 who has held a license for over 3 years. For the next three months the new driver must also be accompanied as before from at night, specifically from 9 P.M. until 6 am. In addition, for the first two years, the new driver must display a sign reading "New Driver" (Hebrew: נהג חדש, Nahag Hadash) in black letters on a yellow background. Anyone failing to comply with these requirements is subject to be fined and tried in traffic court for driving without a license. If a new driver violates a traffic law, one may be required to retake the written and driving test.

== Foreign driving licence ==
New immigrants, tourists, temporary residents, and citizens returning after residing overseas for at least a year may drive in Israel on a foreign licence for one year from entry into Israel.

== Licence conversion ==
Anyone possessing a foreign driving licence residing in Israel for more than 12 months must convert their driving licence. As of 13 August 2017, any immigrant that held a driving licence 5 years prior to his/her immigration can convert his/her licence Without taking any tests After applying at the local licence authority office for an exemption from the written test and the requirement for 28 lessons, one is required to pay for a test at the local post office, and the instructor will arrange for an abbreviated driving test. Prior to 13 May 2014 if the applicant failed two such tests, he or she had to pass the written test before retaking a thorough driving test. Legislation passed by the Knesset on that date, however, allows a licensed foreign driver to re-take the test indefinitely within the first three years following immigration into Israel.
